= Cemais Is Nyfer =

Welsh medieval commote

Coordinates: 52.02245°N 4.8446°W

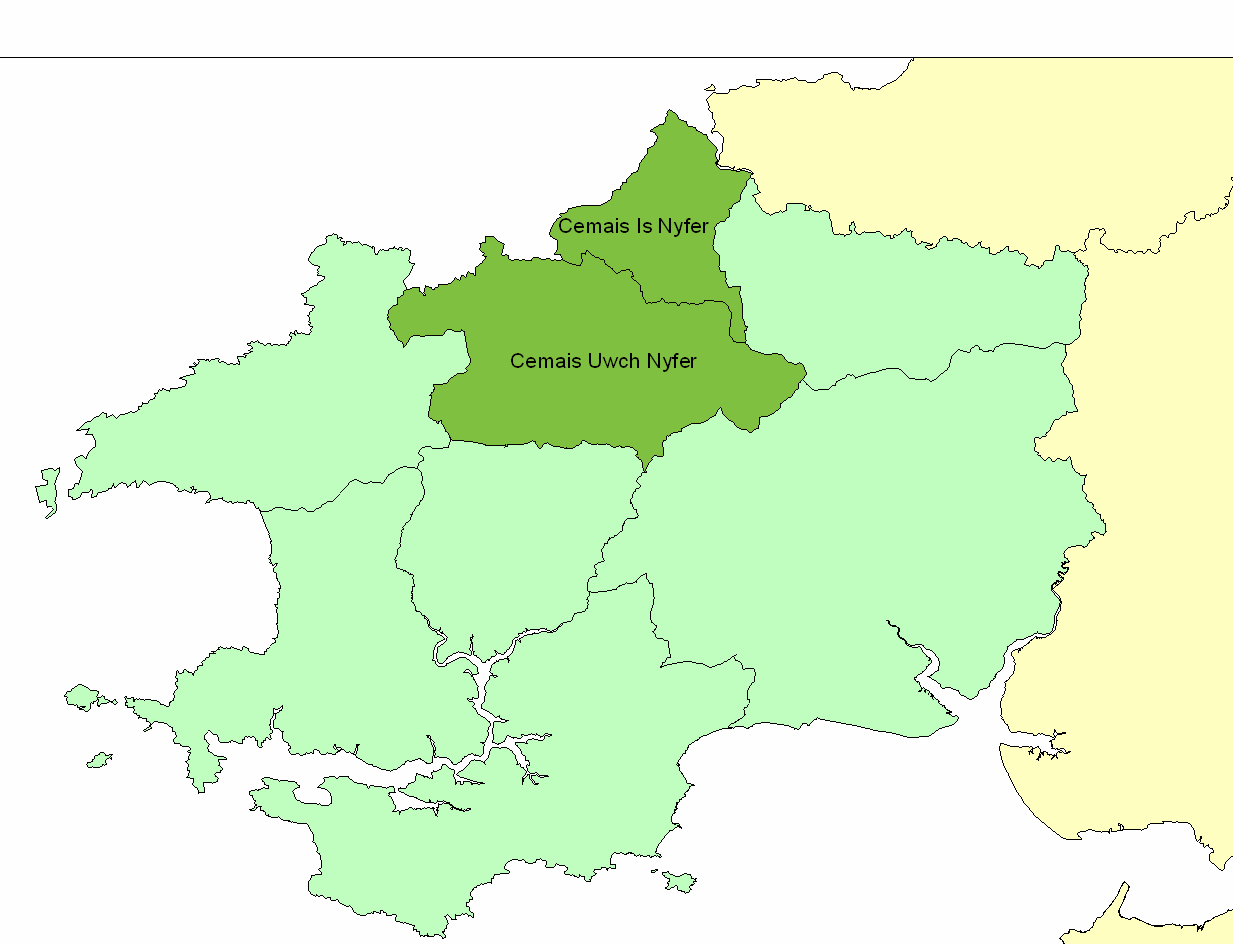
Location of the commote of Cemais Is Nyfer

Cemais Is Nyfer was a mediaeval commote in the Dyfed cantref of Cemais, Wales. It consisted of the territory between the rivers Nyfer and Teifi, and comprised the parishes of Eglwyswrw, Monington, St Dogmaels, Llanfair-Nant-Gwyn, Llantood, Moylgrove and Bayvil, and parts of Nevern and Meline in what is now Pembrokeshire. Its area was about 100 km^{2} and its civil and ecclesiastical headquarters were at Nevern.

The commote was made part of the Norman March in the 12th century, and had at least five Norman castles (Nevern, Pen-yr-allt, Eglwyswrw, Llain Fawr and Dyffryn Mawr). It ceased to be significant at the time of the Laws in Wales Acts 1535–1542, its functions being taken over by the Hundred of Cemais. It is in the predominantly Welsh-speaking north of Pembrokeshire.
