= Pontyglasier =

Village in Pembrokeshire, Wales

Coordinates: 51.99°N 4.71°W

- Location within Pembrokeshire
- OS grid reference: SN1436
- Community: Eglwyswrw
- Principal area: Pembrokeshire
- Country: Wales
- Sovereign state: United Kingdom
- Postcode district: SA
- Police: Dyfed-Powys
- Fire: Mid and West Wales
- Ambulance: Welsh

Pontyglasier (English: Bridge of the glacier - origin obscure), sometimes recorded as Pontyglazier, is a small village 1.3 miles (2 km) south of Eglwyswrw in Pembrokeshire, Wales, on an unclassified road 1 mile (1.6 km) east of Crosswell. It is a scattered rural settlement with few amenities.

== Situation ==
Pontyglasier is in the community of Eglwyswrw and sits near the confluence of two streams, Afon Bannon and Afon Clun-Maen, just south of the point where they join the River Nevern. The bridge referred to in the name spans the Bannon. Pontyglasier is set in undulating farmland in the Welsh-speaking north of the county and is a dispersed settlement centred around the chapel. It is on the border of two parishes: Meline and Eglwyswen and falls ecclesiastically within the latter.

== History ==
In 1891, seven clergymen, including Thomas Morris of Pontyglasier, were charged with beating a bailiff attempting to recover tithe arrears. They were remanded on bail of £40 each. They appeared before magistrates a month later, in which the Reverend Morris was accused of knocking the bailiff's hat off three times during a scuffle. The magistrates found the assault proved against three of the defendants, including Morris, who was fined £3 plus costs for his part.

A Sunday School trip in 1900 was a rare event to be photographed.

== Chapel ==
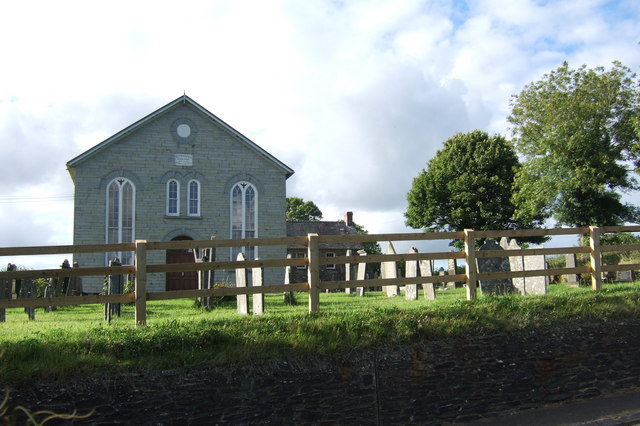
Bethabara Welsh Baptist Chapel

Bethabara Welsh Baptist Chapel is a Grade II listed building constructed in 1873 replacing the former chapel built in 1826. The present chapel is built from Cilgerran stone, and there was originally an eleventh-hour clock face painted on the façade but this has since been rendered over.

== Amenities ==
There is a Land Rover and general vehicle maintenance business, Yr Efail Garage (suggesting the presence of a former smithy), in Pontyglasier and an animal boarding establishment.
