= Bayvil =

Village and parish in Pembrokeshire, Wales

Coordinates: 52.031768°N 4.770814°W

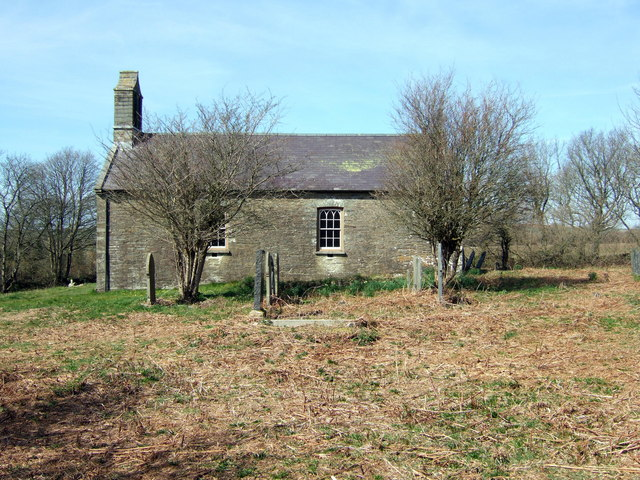
- St Andrew's church

- Location within Pembrokeshire
- OS grid reference: SN1002640664
- Community: Nevern
- Principal area: Pembrokeshire
- Country: Wales
- Sovereign state: United Kingdom
- Post town: Newport, Pembrokeshire
- Postcode district: SA
- Police: Dyfed-Powys
- Fire: Mid and West Wales
- Ambulance: Welsh
- UK Parliament: Preseli Pembrokeshire
- Senedd Cymru – Welsh Parliament: Preseli Pembrokeshire

Bayvil (Welsh: Y Beifil) is a hamlet and parish in Pembrokeshire, Wales. It is situated in the north of the county, 5 kilometres (3.1 mi) east of Newport. It is in the Pembrokeshire Coast National Park. The parish includes most of the village of Felindre Farchog. Together with the parishes of Monington, Moylgrove and most of Nevern, it constitutes the community of Nevern.

== History ==
The name may derive from Norman-French Beauvil, a "pleasant settlement". It is in the heart of Welsh-speaking Pembrokeshire, in the Welsh cantref of Cemais.

The parish appears on a 1578 map of Pembrokeshire. It had, in 1844, a population of 130 in an area of 1,350 acres (550 ha). It included the more developed village of Felindre Farchog and part of the estate of Cwmgloyne, owned by the Lloyd family, and which gave its name to the former Cwmgloyne Arms in the nearby settlement of Crosswell. The estate was broken up to be sold in 1899 and part was sold for a total of £17,000. In 1909 the remainder, including the Bayvil portion, 356 acres, reached a bid of £6,550 before being withdrawn. Parts of the estate were bought by tenants.

== Parish church ==
The parish church of St Andrew was built in the early 19th century and is a Grade II* listed building, being a scarce rural example of an Anglican church of the period. It is built from rubble stone, and has a bellcote and slate roof. The font is 12th century. There is a memorial to T. Lloyd dating from about 1850. Having been closed for a period, with the roof being repaired in 1905, the church was reopened for services in 1908. It is now disused and looked after by the Friends of Friendless Churches.

== Demographics ==
Its census populations were: 102 (1801): 124 (1851): 67 (1901): 75 (1951): 44 (1981). The percentage of Welsh speakers was 100 (1891): 96 (1931): 70 (1971).
