= Church of St Dogfael, Meline =

St Dogfael's Church, Meline
- Church of St Dogfael, Meline
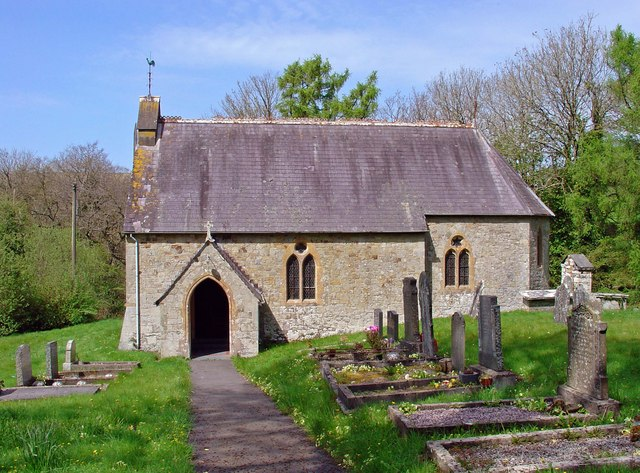
- "An object lesson in High Victorian geometry"

- Location in Pembrokeshire
- 52.0152°N 4.7439°W
- Location: Meline, Pembrokeshire
- Country: Wales
- Denomination: Church in Wales

History
- Status: Redundant
- Founded: 1864–1865
- Dedication: Saint Dogfael

Architecture
- Heritage designation: Grade II
- Designated: 10 December 1997
- Architectural type: Church

Specifications
- Materials: Stone, slate roof

The Church of St Dogfael, Meline, Pembrokeshire, also called the "Church of St. Dogwells", Wales is a redundant church dating from the 19th century. A Grade II listed building, the church is now in the care of the Friends of Friendless Churches.

== History and description ==
The church is dedicated to St Dogfael, and was built between 1864 and 1865. The architect was Robert Jewell Withers and the patron Sir Thomas Lloyd. Lloyd, a landowner and Member of Parliament for Cardiganshire, claimed descent from the ancient Lords of Cemaes and spent a considerable amount of his inheritance in pursuit of a peerage and in the construction of a number of buildings on his estate in a Gothic Revival style, including his home, Bronwydd Castle, the court house at Felindre Farchog, the restoration of the genuinely medieval castle at Newport and the little church of St Dogfael. (Note: Lloyd died, unennobled and massively in debt, in 1876.)

The church is small and simple. Lloyd, Orbach and Scourfield, in their Pembrokeshire volume of the Buildings of Wales Pevsner, describe it as "an object lesson in High Victorian geometry and minimal extraneous detail". It is built of sandstone, with Bath stone dressings and a slate roof. Constructed on the site of an earlier church, the north doorway may a genuine Norman piece, or a later medieval one, from the original structure. The church is a Grade II listed building and, having been declared redundant, is now in the care of the charity, the Friends of Friendless Churches.

On church grounds sits the "Hogtivis Stone", a Latin inscription which reads, HOGTIVIS FILI DEMETI, which translates to, "Hogtivis, son of Demetus".

== Sources ==
- Lloyd, Thomas; Orbach, Julian; Scourfield, Robert (2004). Pembrokeshire. The Buildings of Wales. New Haven, US and London: Yale University Press. ISBN 0300101783. OCLC 978065767.
