= Brynberian =

Village in Pembrokeshire, Wales

Coordinates: 51.98°N 4.76°W

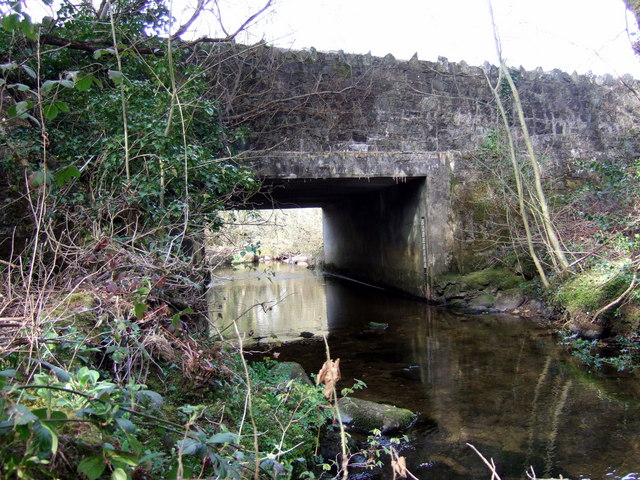
- Ancient bridge over Afon Brynberian

- Location within Pembrokeshire
- OS grid reference: SN1035
- Community: Eglwyswrw
- Principal area: Pembrokeshire
- Country: Wales
- Sovereign state: United Kingdom
- Post town: Crymych
- Postcode district: SA41
- Police: Dyfed-Powys
- Fire: Mid and West Wales
- Ambulance: Welsh
- UK Parliament: Preseli Pembrokeshire
- Senedd Cymru – Welsh Parliament: Preseli Pembrokeshire

Brynberian is a small village in north Pembrokeshire, Wales, in the foothills of the Preseli Mountains in the Pembrokeshire Coast National Park. It is in the community of Eglwyswrw and the parish of Nevern, and is on the B4329 road between Crosswell and Tafarn y Bwlch. Afon Brynberian flows through the village under an ancient bridge and joins the River Nevern to the north.

== History ==
In medieval times Brynberian was in the ancient cantref of Cemais, under Norman control from about 1100 until 1326. The hundred of Cemais was created in 1536. Freeholders of Cemais held pasture rights on the Preseli Mountains from the 13th century. Brynberian was one of the last places to be enclosed and probably began to be settled around the time of the establishment of the Independent Chapel in 1690. The bridge (as 'Pont llin birian') is mentioned by George Owen of Henllys as existing c.1600. During the 19th century there was a woollen factory and mill and most of the present buildings in the village are 19th century. An 1888 map shows a number of buildings. The mill is a Grade II-listed building, as is one of its outbuildings.

The village is in the south of the parish of Nevern. It previously had a shop, Post Office and school, but these are now closed. The school, Llwynihirion, became Brynberian Community Centre.

== Chapel ==
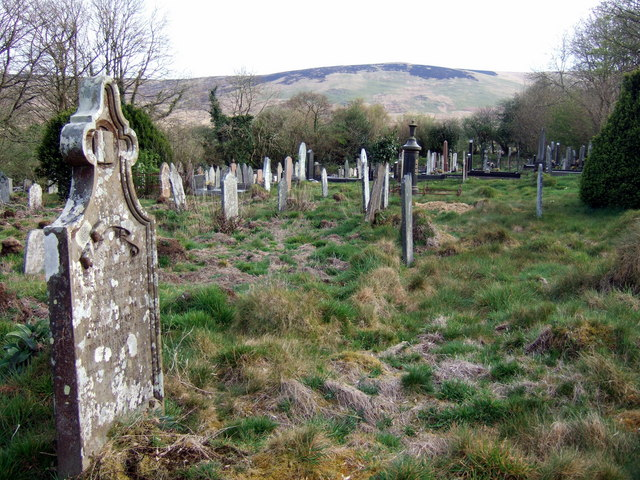
Chapel burial ground

Brynberian Independent Chapel is a Grade II listed building and may have been built, as others were, to serve the settlement which was some distance from the parish church. The chapel was founded in 1690, one of the earliest in the locality, and the movement spread from Brynberian to other local settlements. Thomas Beynon was an early minister; he died in 1729. The chapel was rebuilt in 1808. The present building dates from 1842 and the interior from 1882. Chapel records are held by Dyfed Family History Society.

== Prehistoric sites ==
Nearby Pentre Ifan is one of the largest cromlechs in Wales, and in close proximity is Bedd yr Afanc, a burial chamber that over time has degraded.

About a mile to the southwest of Brynberian is Waun Mawn, a site believed to be the precursor to one of the stone circles of Stonehenge.
