= St Andrew's Church, Bayvil =

Coordinates: 52.0314°N 4.7688°W

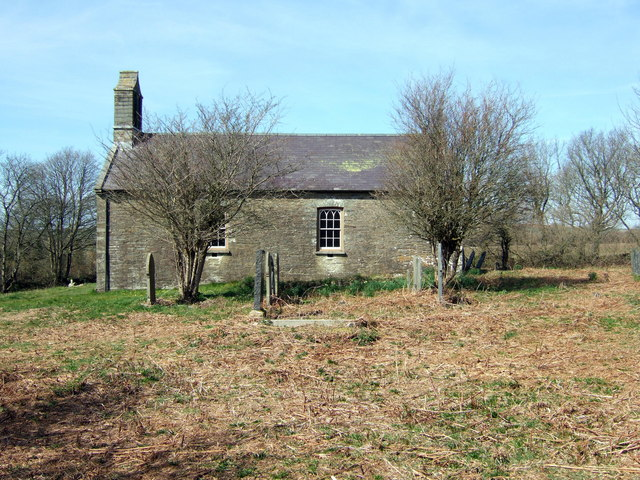
- St Andrew's Church, Bayvil, from the south

- Location in Pembrokeshire
- OS grid reference: NZ 274 513
- Location: Bayvil, Pembrokeshire
- Country: Wales
- Denomination: Church in Wales
- Website: Friends of Friendless Churches

History
- Dedication: Saint Andrew

Architecture
- Functional status: Redundant
- Heritage designation: Grade II*
- Designated: 16 January 1952
- Architectural type: Church

Specifications
- Materials: Stone, slate roof, blue lias bellcote

St Andrew's Church, Bayvil, is a redundant church standing in an isolated position in the hamlet of Bayvil, some 2 kilometres (1.2 mi) to the northeast of Nevern, Pembrokeshire, Wales. It has been designated by Cadw as a Grade II* listed building, and is under the care of the Friends of Friendless Churches. It is listed Grade II* because it is "a scarce rural example of an unaltered Anglican church of its date".

== History ==
St Andrew's is thought to be an early 19th-century rebuild of a medieval church. It was designed by a local architect, David Evans of Eglwyswrw, the first Welsh-based architect to have been trained in Wales, rather than in England. Since it was declared redundant, the church has been maintained by the charity, the Friends of Friendless Churches, who hold a 999-year lease with effect from 7 October 1983. Since acquiring the church, the charity has reinstated the Gothic-style sash windows, and renewed the rendering on the western face to deal with the effects of damp.

== Architecture ==
The church is constructed in stone rubble with a slate roof and a bellcote in blue lias stone. It is rectangular in plan and consists of a single chamber. The windows are twelve-pane sashes with Gothic tracery in the top panes; there are two such windows on the south side, and one on each of the east and north sides. At the west end is a flat-arched doorway.

Internally it is "remarkable" as it is a "little altered" early 19th-century church interior. Its contents include plastered walls, slate floors, box pews, a three-decker pulpit, and simple communion rails and altar. At the east end is a mid 19th-century armorial plaque in Bath stone under a memorial. The tall pulpit is panelled and painted, with a sounding board almost touching the ceiling. The church also contains a simple 12th-century square font.
