= Abbey of St Mary, St Dogmaels =

Ruined abbey in Pembrokeshire, Wales

Coordinates: 52.08052°N 4.68078°W

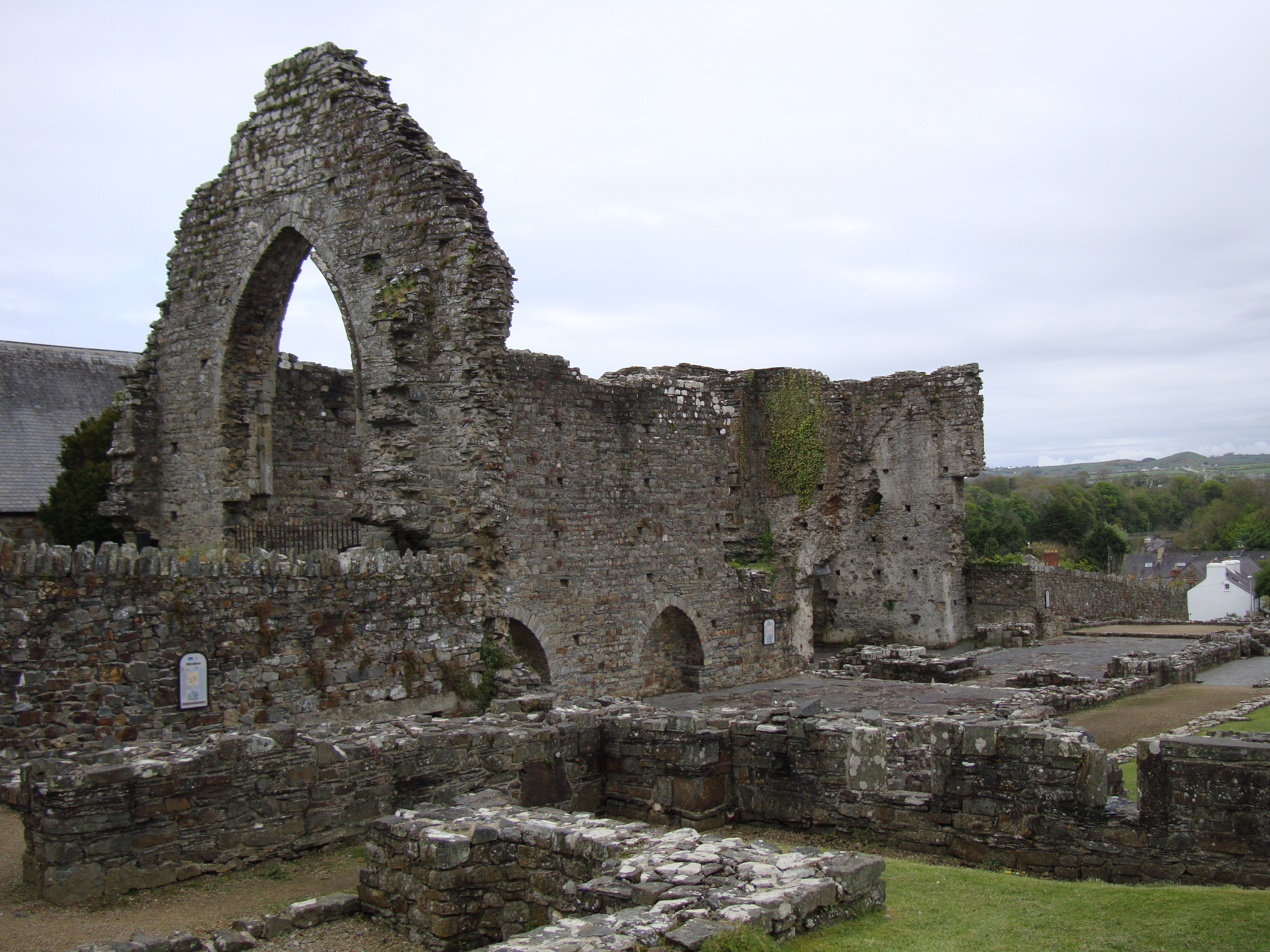
St Dogmael's Abbey

The Abbey of St Mary (also known as St Dogmaels Abbey) is Grade I listed ruined abbey in St Dogmaels in Pembrokeshire, Wales, on the banks of the River Teifi and close to Cardigan and Poppit Sands.

It is the ruins of a medieval abbey, originally founded in 1115 by the Fitzmartin family of Cemais. It was established by the Order of Tiron, a medieval monastic order, which owned a large number of priories and abbeys in France, England, Wales, Scotland and Ireland.

It is now in ruins, but substantial parts of the abbey remain, including the western end wall, the north wall, the north transept, and eastern walls of the crypt. There are also several monastic buildings which survive to the south of the abbey and a detached 13th century building, most likely an infirmary, which is located to the south east.

== History ==
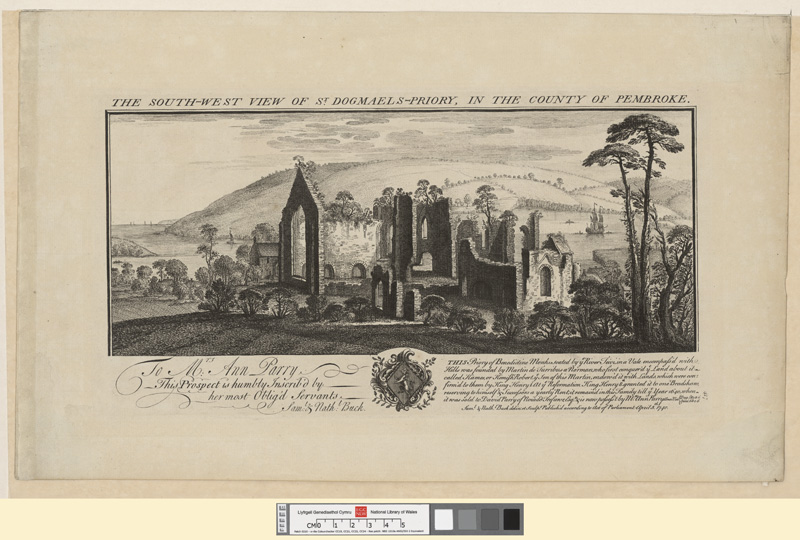
A view of the ruins in 1740

The site of the abbey is thought to have been the location of a Celtic monastery founded by Dogmael, a 6th-century saint said to have been the son of Ithel ap Ceredig ap Cunedda Wledig, and also reputedly the cousin of Saint David.

The abbey itself was founded by the Normal Lord Robert Fitz-Martin and his wife, Maud Peverel (sister of William Peverel the younger, d.1149), who brought thirteen monks of the Tironensian Order in Normandy to live in at the priory. In 1118, he was then given another 13 monks and gained permission to raise the classification of the priory to Abbey status. Formal establishment of this took place 10 September 1121, when Fulchard was installed as the first Abbot by Bishop Bernard of St David's. It remained a daughter house of Tiron, probably until its dissolution. However, in 1138, the village and abbey of St Dogmaels were sacked by Gruffudd ap Cynan's sons, Owain Gwynedd and Cadwaladr, acting with princes Anaraud and Cadell with the help of Danish mercenaries. It is possible that a major building project in 1150–53 was intended to repair damage caused by the attack. In 1188, Gerald of Wales stayed at the abbey with Baldwin, Archbishop of Canterbury, whilst they gathered support for the Third Crusade on their preaching tour of Wales.

The abbey was also known for its library. One manuscript, a 13th-century copy of Eusebius's Historia Ecclesiastica, survives and is housed in St John's College, Cambridge.

The abbey was dissolved in 1536, along with hundreds of other houses whose annual income was less than £200. By this time, there were only eight monks and the abbot. The majority of the abbey's possessions were leased to John Bradshaw of Presteigne in Radnorshire. He built a mansion, probably within the abbey precinct. Large parts of the abbey complex were destroyed or altered by Bradshaw who completed his mansion in 1543. He and his descendants lived on the site for over a century. After Bradshaw's death the estate shifted between a multitude of heirs and resales, until 1934 when Representative Body of the Church in Wales placed the estate into the care of the Commission of Works. In 1947 excavation and consolidation began.

Since then, multiple 'Shakespeare in the Abbey' productions have been staged. Also a visitor centre was created in the former Coach House, which opened in June 2008. These events and additions have led to an increase in the number of visitors.

== The Ruins ==
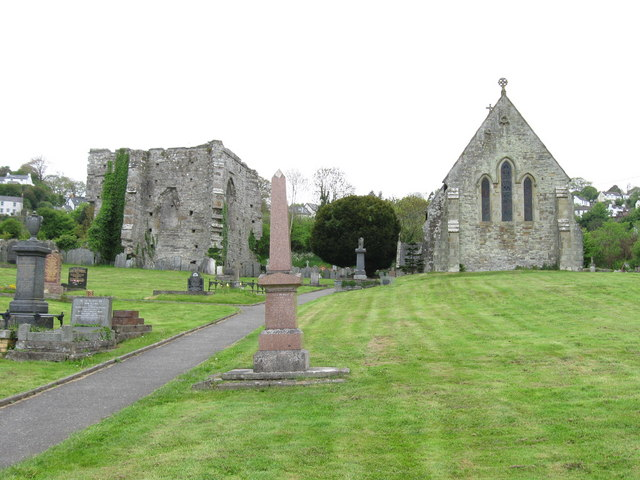
The Church of St Thomas and remains of St. Mary's Abbey

The earliest surviving remains date from the first half of the twelfth century. It seems that parts of the church were built to satisfy the immediate requirements of the monastery, but that the western part, for the use of the laity, was not finished. The nave was completed in the thirteenth century, although without the intended aisles. Unusually the church lacks a west doorway, possibly because the slope of the ground becomes steeper. The square-ended sanctuary was built over a vaulted crypt, possibly a repository for relics of St Dogmael. About the middle of the thirteenth century, the cloister was enlarged northwards; the cloister arcades were rebuilt in stone about the same time. The domestic quarters were extensively rebuilt at the end of the thirteenth or beginning of the fourteenth century. A new infirmary was built, followed by a chapter house. In the fourteenth or fifteenth century, much of the west range was altered to provide improved accommodation for the abbot. A new wing was added for the abbot's guests. The last alteration to the church was the rebuilding of the north transept, with its elaborate fan vaulted roof. This happened in the early sixteenth century, not long before the suppression of the monastery. The lavish design indicates it may have been an individually distinct chapel, possibly built as a memorial to the founder's family, the lords of Cemais.

Substantial parts of the church survive, including the western end wall, the north wall and northern transept. The crypt, beneath the former eastern two bays of the presbytery, is preserved to the springing of the vault. Fifteenth century floor tiles remain in large areas of the nave. The abbey is Grade I listed.

Fragments of carved stonework have been collected in the infirmary, and several of the incised stones which were formerly in the parish church have been gathered against the south wall.
