= Giant's Dance =

The Giant's Dance or Giants' Dance is a stone circle in an Arthurian legend first documented c. 1136 in Historia Regum Britanniae, by Geoffrey of Monmouth in 1136.

== In the Merlin legend ==
Geoffrey of Monmouth describes it as a megalithic stone circle, whose stones were used to build the Neolithic Stonehenge on Salisbury Plain in Wiltshire, England.

According to Geoffrey, the wizard Merlin disassembled a circle at Mount Killaraus in Ireland and had men drag the stones to Wiltshire, and had giants assemble Stonehenge.

== Modern use of name ==
In modern use Giant's Dance has been used to refer to:

- A fictional stone circle that was moved from Ireland to Britain by Merlin
- Stonehenge, Wiltshire, England: the megalithic stone circle
- Waun Mawn, Pembrokeshire, Wales: a proposed identification of the dismantled megalithic stone circle
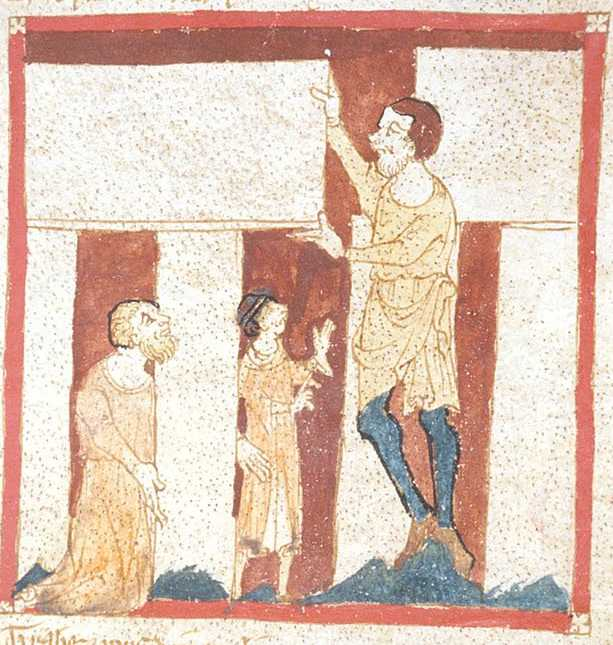
Merlin re-assembling the Giant's Dance, with the help of giants

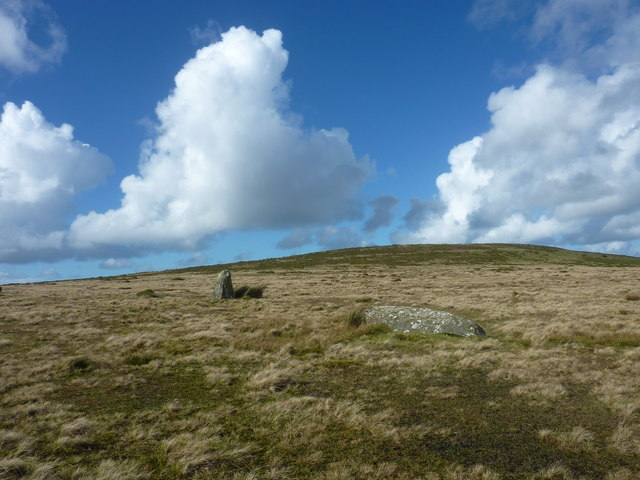
Waun Mawn, Pembrokeshire, Wales

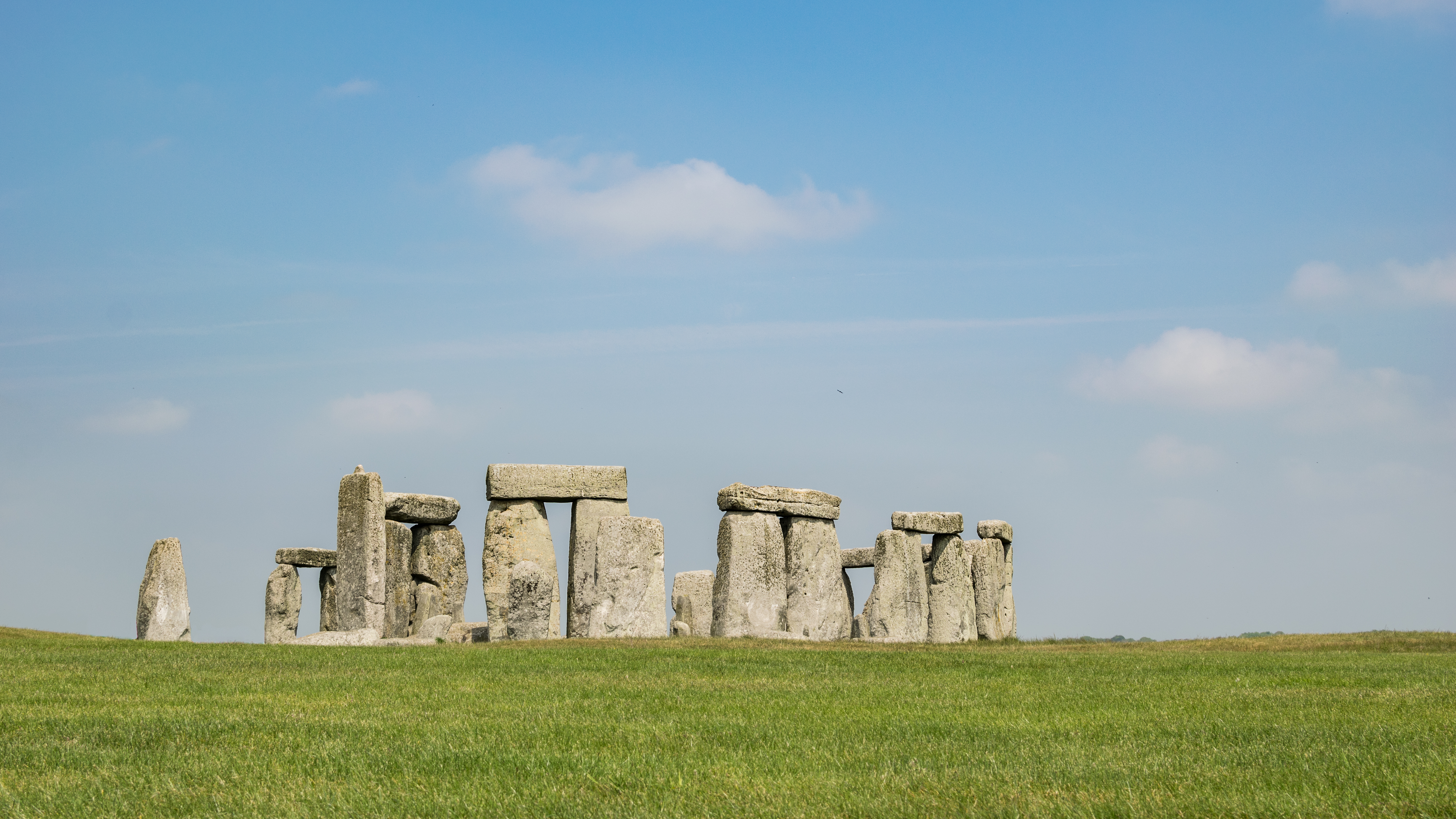
Stonehenge, Wiltshire, England
