= Killare =

Killare may refer to:

- Killare (civil parish) in County Westmeath, Ireland
- The Hill of Uisneach, a hill just east of the present-day parish
- Mount Killaraus, a location in Arthurian legend
