= Penygroes =

Penygroes or Pen-y-groes may refer to any of several places in Wales:

- Pen-y-groes, Gwynedd, a village in North Wales
  - Penygroes railway station, a former station in the village
- Penygroes, Pembrokeshire
- Pen-y-groes, Carmarthenshire
- Pen-y-groes (electoral ward), an electoral division in Carmarthenshire
- Pen-y-groes, an electoral ward covering the village of Pen-y-groes, Gwynedd
