= Thomas Beynon (Independent minister) =

Welsh minister

Thomas Beynon (died 1729) was a Welsh Independent minister. He lived in the Pembrokeshire area, and is known to have had a son at Brynllywarch Academy by 1696. He was minister of Brynberian Independent Church, Pembrokeshire. He died in June 1729.
