= Benjamin Evans (minister) =

Welsh congregational minister

Benjamin Evans (23 February 1740 – 2 March 1821) was a Welsh congregational minister.

Evans was born at Ffynon-Adda, Meline, Pembrokeshire, on 23 February 1740. In his early days, while he was minister at Llanuwchllyn, Merionethshire (where he was ordained 1769), he met with a good deal of persecution and was compelled to apply to the King's Bench for a mandamus before he was allowed to conduct the services in peace.

He removed in 1777 to Haverfordwest, and thence to Drewen in Cardiganshire, 24 June 1779, where he was much beloved, and remained till his death, 3 March 1821. His first duty here was to undo the work of his predecessor, who was in sympathy with the Arminian movement, then led by the Rev. David Lloyd of Llwynrhydowen. Evans showed great tact and gradually and successfully led back the congregation to the prevailing Calvinism of the day.

The Baptist controversy which began about 1788 was originated by the great activity of a few Baptists in the neighbourhood, who distributed large numbers of tracts among members of the congregation. This compelled the minister to act on the defensive. The historian of nonconformity in Wales says that probably nothing abler was ever written on both sides of this question of baptism than the letters of Evans on the one side and those of Dr. William Richards of Lynn on the other. According to the same authority Evans's services to his countrymen were very great, both through the pulpit and the press.

== Works ==
His published works are (all in Welsh):

- Translation of a sermon on the gunpowder explosion at Chester, by Dr. J. Jenkins, 1772
- Letters on Baptism 1788; second edition, with additions in reply to Dr. Richards, 1789.
- Sufferings of the Black Men in Jamaica, &c. 1789 (published anonymously)
- The Waitings of the Black Men in the Sugar Islands (published anonymously)
- A poem on baptism in reply to the Rev. Benjamin Francis, 1790
- Translation of the Rev. Matthias Maurice's 'Social Religion,' 1797
- Two catechisms (1) 'On the great Principles of Religion,' (2) 'On the Principles of Non- Nonconformity.’
- Four sermons on practical religion.
