= Albro Castle =

Building in Pembrokeshire, Wales

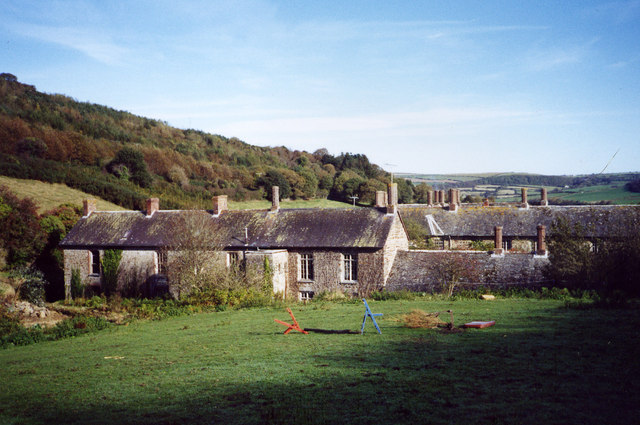
- Albro Castle in 2002
- Interactive map of the Albro Castle area
- Former names: Cardigan Union Workhouse

General information
- Location: St Dogmaels, Wales
- Coordinates: 52.089°N 4.687°W
- Completed: 1840
- Cost: £3,250

Technical details
- Floor count: 2

Design and construction
- Architect: William Owen
- Main contractor: Benjamin Evans

Albro Castle is a former workhouse in the north of the village of St Dogmaels, Pembrokeshire, Wales. The building was Grade II* listed in 1992 as one of the least-altered workhouses in Wales. After closing as a workhouse in 1935 the buildings were bought by Pembrokeshire County Council and in 1948 were sold into private ownership.

== Construction ==
The site was purchased for £290 by the Cardigan Poor Law Union. Plans and specifications were drawn up by William Owen of Haverfordwest who was appointed to oversee the works. Benjamin Evans was commissioned to build the workhouse for £2,700 and Owen was paid £160. The Board of Guardians would arrange for hedges to enclose the workhouse and an access road from the beach. On 9 March 1839 the Board passed a resolution: That no parochial relief be granted to any applicant keeping a dog.

The buildings were completed in 1840 for the Poor Law Commissioners at a cost of £3,250. The workhouse was to provide for the poor of 26 parishes in Cardiganshire and Pembrokeshire. The two-storey original building included a bakehouse, and had Tudor-style doorways and chimneys. The layout of the complex was three blocks connected by a central spine, giving four open-ended courtyards. At the centre of the spine was an observation room with canted windows. Internally, the principal rooms were large and lit from both sides. The stairways were stone.

== History ==
=== Workhouse ===
By the third quarter of its first year, 1840, Cardigan Union Workhouse was home to 14 illegitimate and 13 legitimate children and 13 able-bodied women of whom four were "mothers of bastards", plus an unknown number of men. In 1841 there were 43 inmates, including a vagrant. Within two years the workhouse was accommodating 102 people and within another two years there were 224. The majority were men. By 1845 there were 441 in a complex designed for 120 inmates.

In 1848 Ann Lundy, daughter of the Master and Matron, was appointed schoolmistress. There was frequent disruption during the workhouse's existence, from both inmates and staff, with frequent reports in the local press.

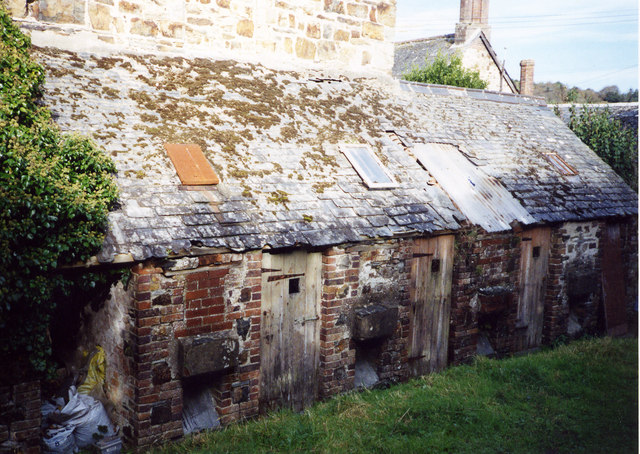
Vagrants block (2002)

In the 1870s there were some 130 inmates. The 1881 census listed 52 residents, including 3 staff. In 1884 vagrant cells with grading grills and chutes for breaking stone were constructed. In 1901 a Ladies Visiting Committee noted that there was no infirmary and suggested fitting out a room to separate the sick and dying from those who were only infirm.

Insanitary conditions heralded cases of typhoid in the 1920s and in 1929 the workhouse was considered to be the worst in Wales, according to inspectors. The institution finally closed in 1935 and the property was taken over by Pembrokeshire County Council.

=== Barracks ===
In World War II the building provided accommodation for the 111th Ordnance Company of the U.S. Army from January 1944. The 180 men and their vehicles, including trucks and tanks, left at night on 6 June 1944, D-day, bound for Normandy.

=== Post-war ===
The property was sold in 1948 and converted into flats and then workshops. It was listed Grade II* in 1992. Currently, Albro Castle is privately owned holiday accommodation.
