= Monington, Pembrokeshire =

Village and parish in Pembrokeshire, Wales

Coordinates: 52.062°N 4.725°W

Monington: Welsh: Eglwys Wythwr
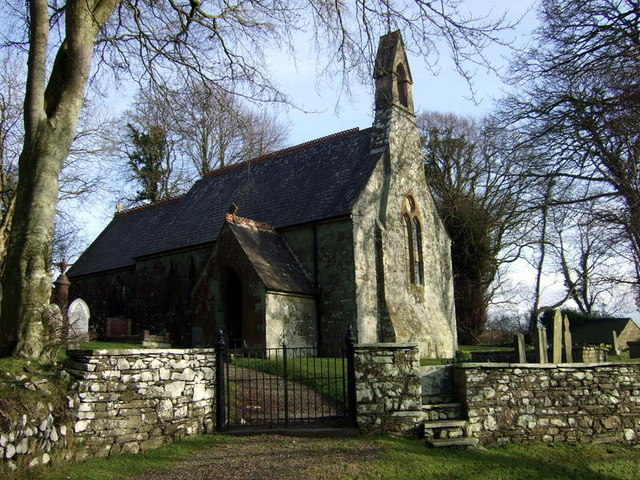
- Parish church of St Nicholas

- Location within Pembrokeshire
- OS grid reference: SN132440
- Community: Nevern
- Principal area: Pembrokeshire
- Country: Wales
- Sovereign state: United Kingdom
- Post town: Cardigan
- Postcode district: SA43
- Police: Dyfed-Powys
- Fire: Mid and West Wales
- Ambulance: Welsh
- UK Parliament: Preseli Pembrokeshire
- Senedd Cymru – Welsh Parliament: Preseli Pembrokeshire

Monington (Welsh: Eglwys Wythwr) is a small settlement and parish in the community of Nevern, north Pembrokeshire, Wales. It is on the Nant Ceibwr (Ceibwr Stream) that flows through Moylegrove and into Ceibwr Bay. Part of the parish lies within the Pembrokeshire Coast National Park.

== Name ==
Monington's Welsh name translates into English as the "church of eight men", reflecting the fact that there were eight freeholders in the parish when it was founded. The origin of the English name is obscure.

== Description ==
Monington is a rural parish in the community of Nevern, close to the source of Nant Ceibwr, the stream that flows through Moylegrove and into Ceibwr Bay. The parish is in the Diocese of St David's and the parish church is dedicated to St Nicholas. The present church, built in 1860, is a Grade II listed building, built in 1860 in high-Victorian Gothic style.

There are 11 other listed buildings or structures in the parish, including several at Pantsaeson in the north of the parish.

== History ==
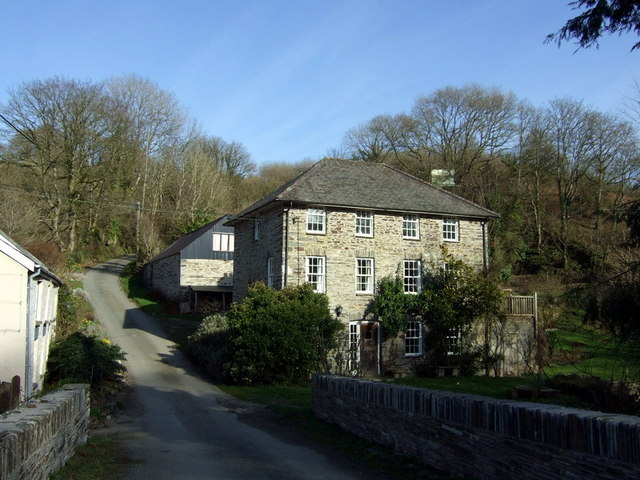
Monington mill

Dyfed Archaeological Trust records suggest that a battle took place at Pantsaeson in the early medieval period.

The earliest-known written records of Monington are from the 13th century when knight's fees were contributing to the manor of Maenclochog. Parishioners of Monington in the 16th century held ancient grazing rights in the Preseli Mountains resulting from an historic association with St Dogmael's Abbey. From 1536 Monington was in the Hundred of Cemais, and it is marked as Egloiswither on a 1578 parish map of Pembrokeshire. An 1838 tithe map of Monington shows named buildings, mills, mill leat, mill pond, gardens (with paths), farmyards, fences, orchard, parkland, woods, quarry (gravel), hill-drawing, footpath and/or bridleway, waterbodies, springs, well and a kiln.

The quarry referred to in the tithe map, Cware Trefigin, was still in operation in 2019 and contains significant deposits of sand and gravel.
