= Eglwyswen =

Village and parish in Pembrokeshire, Wales

Coordinates: 51.995°N 4.69°W

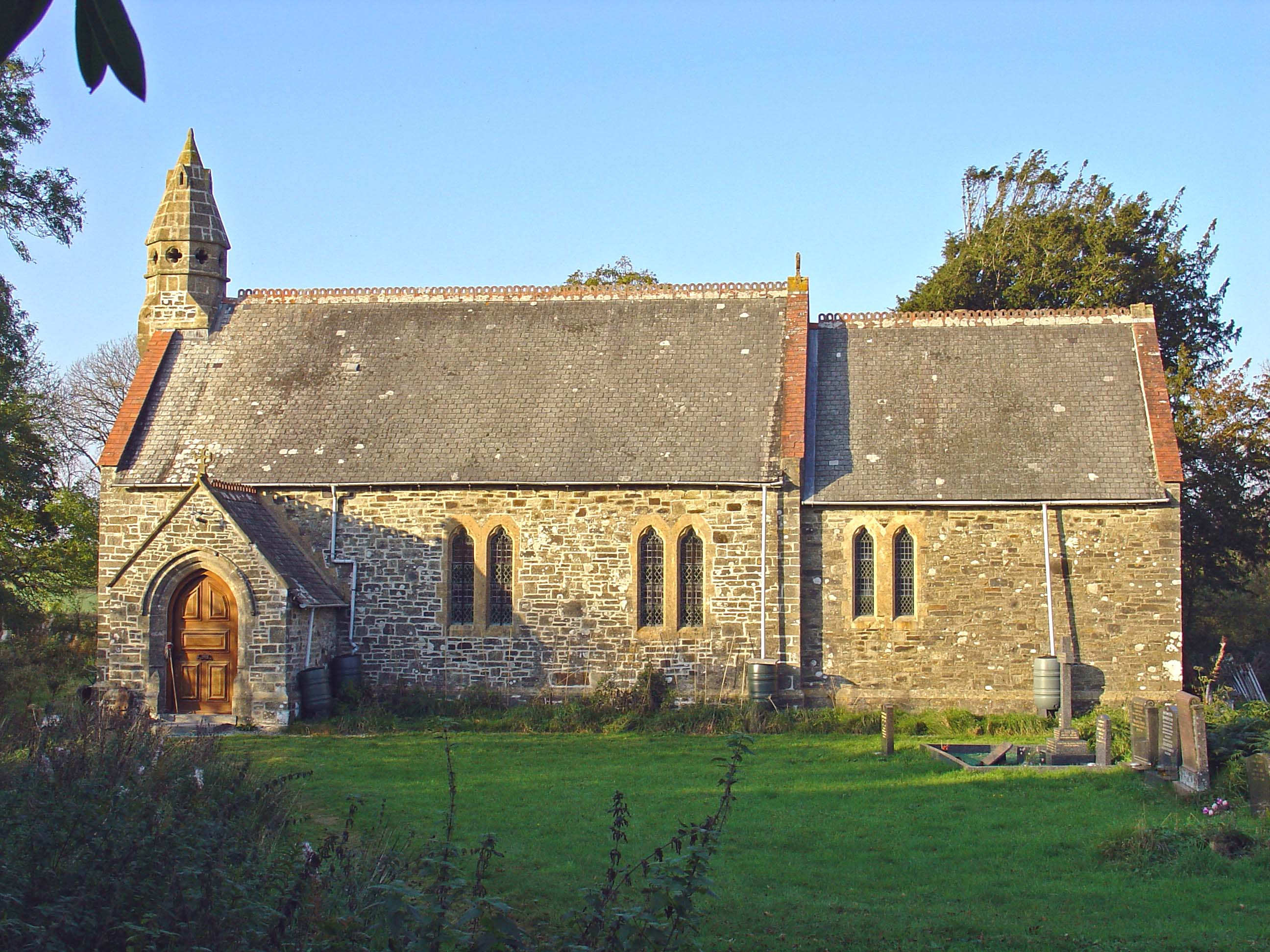
- St Michael's Church, Eglwyswen

- Location within Pembrokeshire
- OS grid reference: SN151364
- Community: Crymych
- Principal area: Pembrokeshire
- Country: Wales
- Sovereign state: United Kingdom
- Police: Dyfed-Powys
- Fire: Mid and West Wales
- Ambulance: Welsh

Eglwyswen (Welsh pronunciation; sometimes called Whitechurch or Whitchurch-by-Cardigan) is a scattered rural settlement and parish in Pembrokeshire, Wales. It is on the north slopes of the Preseli Hills, 2.5 miles (4.0 km) northwest of Crymych. The south-western part of the parish is in the Pembrokeshire Coast National Park and includes the settlements of Pontyglasier and Penygroes. The parish is part of the community of Crymych.

== Name ==
The Welsh placename means "white church". It was formerly called Whitchurch-by-Cardigan to distinguish it from Whitchurch near St David's. The parish is predominantly Welsh-speaking.

== History ==
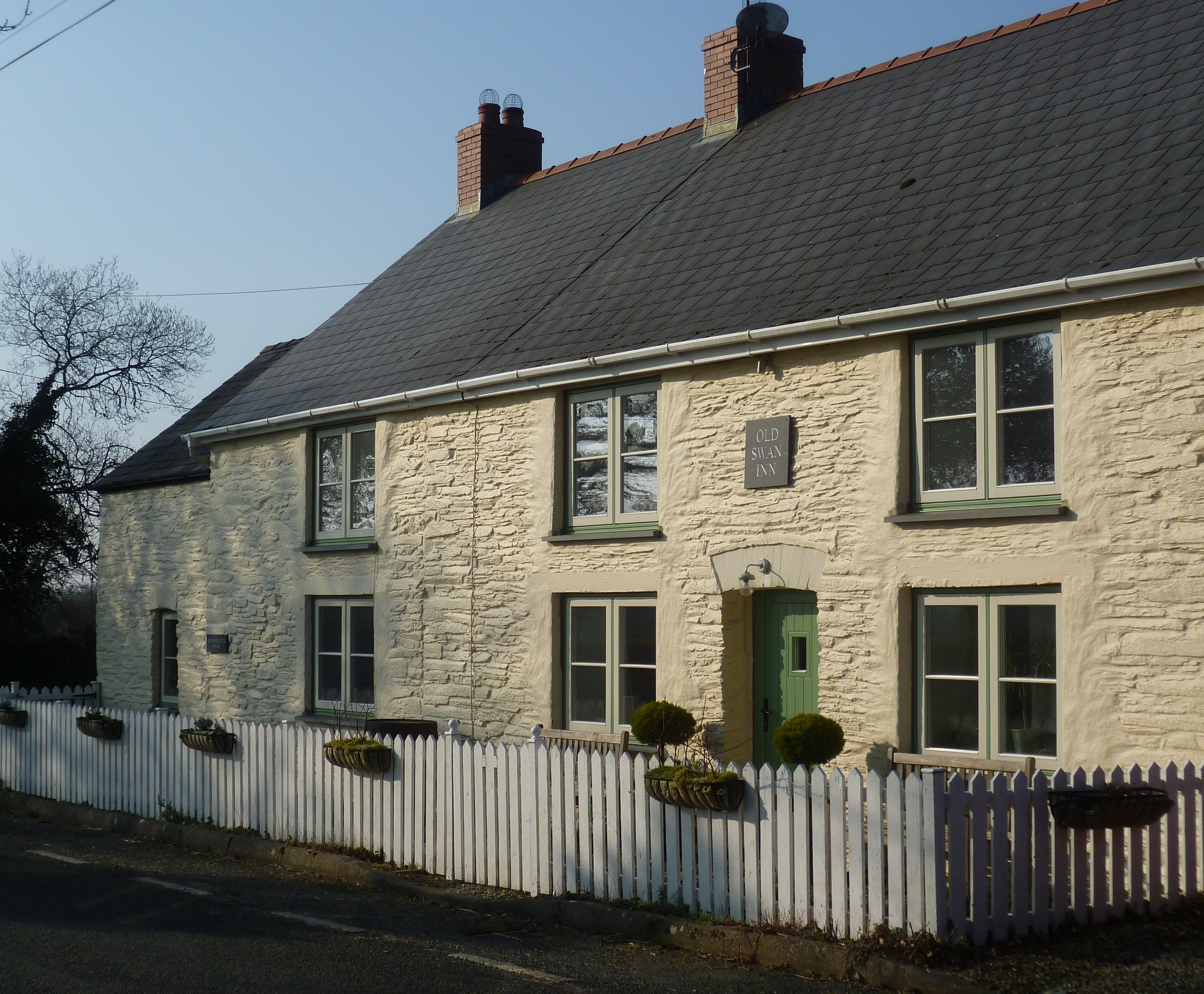
The former Swan Inn

Eglwyswen appears on a 1578 parish map of Pembrokeshire as Whitchurch.

In the early 19th century much of the parish was arable or pasture, with some upland rough grazing in the south where the Preseli Mountains rise. Local stone was noted as having a good proportion of quartz, and there were good turbaries where turf could be cut for fuel, and a pre-1850 parish map shows a woollen factory in the west of the parish. The population of the parish in 1881 was 302, and in 1891 it was 275.

1891 saw the parish involved in months of widespread agitation against the new Tithe Act; there was some violence towards the bailiffs, who were supported by a police presence. The majority of the farmers in the parish were freeholders, and the long drawn out troubles were referred to in The Cardiff Times as "The Welsh Tithe War".

A Board School existed in the parish (shared with the neighbouring parish of Meline) into the 20th century. In 1904 H. M. Inspector noted: "This school well maintains its usual efficiency", which meant the highest grant was earned.

In the centre of the hamlet is the former Swan Inn and shop, which last served a beer in the 1920s, and closed its shop doors in the 1950s. It had been trading at least since 1876 when a new licence was granted to Thomas Thomas. This Welsh long house, called Brynmeredith, (presumably before it became a pub with rooms) is more commonly known locally as Swan Inn, and is now a purely residential property again after being a holiday cottage and home for its owners from 2011-2024.

== Worship ==
The parish church is dedicated to St Michael. The present building was constructed in 1872 with the foundation stone being laid on 3 July in the presence of a large number of people, probably on the foundations of an earlier church: the south porch features a plaque dated 1591. The new church was consecrated and opened by the Bishop of St David's in July 1873. A stained glass window was added in 1956. The church closed in 1999. The dedication to St Michael was not recorded until 1796; an earlier dedication may have been to St Meugan.

There are chapels at Penygroes and Pontyglasier.

== Demographics ==
The parish had an area of 2,520 acres (1,020 ha). Its census populations were: 247 (1801): 349 (1851): 244 (1901): 217 (1951): 156 (1981).

The percentage of Welsh speakers was 100 (1891): 92 (1931): 86 (1971).
