= Dogmael =

Welsh saint

Saint Dogmael
- Born: 5th century Wales
- Residence: Pembrokeshire, Wales
- Died: 6th century St Dogmael's Abbey
- Feast: 14 June

Saint Dogmael (or Docmael, Dogfael, Dogmeel, Dogwel, Toel) was a 6th-century Welsh monk and preacher who is considered a saint. His feast day is 14 June.

== Life ==
Dogmael (or Dogfael, Dogwel) was of the house of Cunedda, descended from the kings of Wales, and was the son of Ithel (or Ithael) ap Ceredig ab Cunedda Wledig. His grandmother was Saint Meleri, daughter of Saint Brychan. He is said to have been the cousin of Saint David, who was also a grandson of Ceredig.

Dogmael became a monk, and seems to have concentrated his preaching in Pembrokeshire, where there are a number of churches dedicated to him.

== Legacy ==
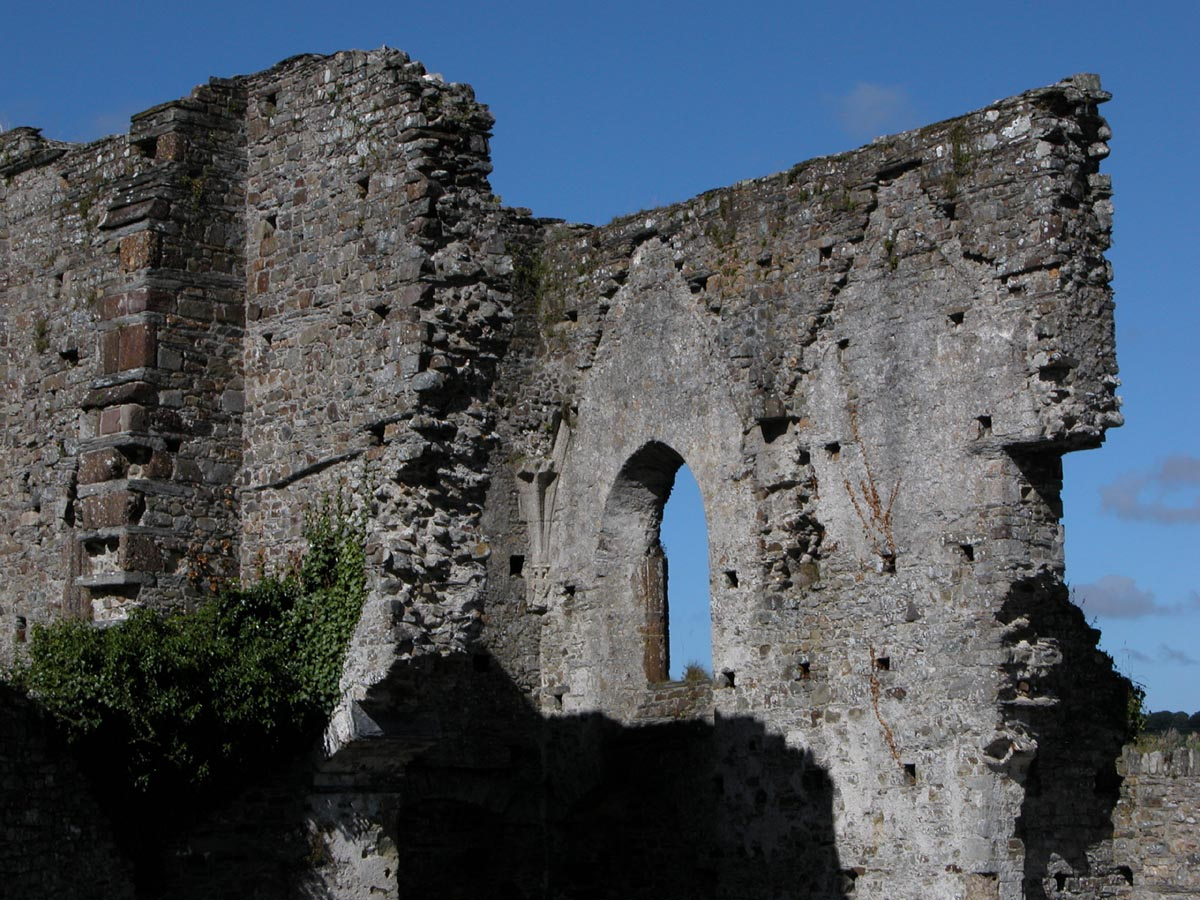
St Dogmaels Abbey today

The following of Dogfael is reflected in a number of churches in what is now north Pembrokeshire. Based on the locations of his churches, Dogmael's cult was centered to the south of the River Teifi in the Dyfed communities of Cemais and Pebidiog.

St Dogmael's Abbey, now ruined, stands on a hillside above the Teifi. It was founded in 1120 by Robert fitz Martin and his wife Maud Peveril. It contains the traditional site of St Dogmael's grave.

The village of St Dogmaels is on the south side of the Teifi, facing Cardigan; St Dogmaels is named in Welsh Llandudoch. Other churches include Capel Degwel nearby, St Dogwell's near Fishguard and the Church of St Dogfael, Meline. Llanddogwel (Llanddygfael) in Anglesey is also dedicated to the saint.

== Butler's account ==
The hagiographer Alban Butler wrote in his Lives of the Primitive Fathers, Martyrs, and Other Principal Saints, under 14 June,

St DOCMAEL, C. Dom. Lombineau, in his lives of the Saints of Brittany (p.9), was at a loss to discover who this saint was. But the English and British calendars inform us, that he flourished in Pembrokeshire, in the sixth century. By his fervour in the practice of all virtues, especially prayer and penance, he was a living instance of the maxim laid down by St. Bernard, (Serm.25 in Cant. n.8) that "the humiliations of the cross are sweet to a soul which is sensible of what she owes to him who was crucified for the love of her." Ah! shall we set any bounds to our endeavours to love him every day and in every action with greater and greater fervour, seeing we shall never be able to love him so much either as he deserves or as he loves us, base and defiled as we are! St. Docmael is titular patron of the church of Pomerit-Jaudy, in the diocess of Trequier, in Brittany, where he is honoured under the name of St. Toël. See Chatelain, p. 295.

== Sources ==
- Butler, Alban (1799), The Lives of the Primitive Fathers, Martyrs, and Other Principal Saints: Compiled from Original Monuments and Other Authentic Records, J. Moir This article incorporates text from this source, which is in the public domain.
- Charles-Edwards, T. M. (23 September 2004). "Dogfael [St Dogfael, Dogwel, Dygfael, Dogmael]". Oxford Dictionary of National Biography (online ed.). Oxford University Press. doi:10.1093/ref:odnb/7769. (Subscription, Wikipedia Library access or UK public library membership required.)
- Emanuel, Hywel David (1959), "Dogmael", Dictionary of Welsh Biography, National Library of Wales
- Ross, David, "St Dogmael's Abbey", Britain Express
- St. Augustine's Abbey, Ramsgate (1921), The Book of saints : a dictionary of servants of God canonized by the Catholic Church, London: A. & C. Black, ltd. This article incorporates text from this source, which is in the public domain.
- Starr, Brian Daniel (2008), The Life of Saint Brychan: King of Brycheiniog and Family, Brian Daniel Starr, ISBN 978-1-4392-0361-3
