= St Dogmaels =

Village, parish and community in Pembrokeshire, Wales

St Dogmaels: Welsh: Llandudoch
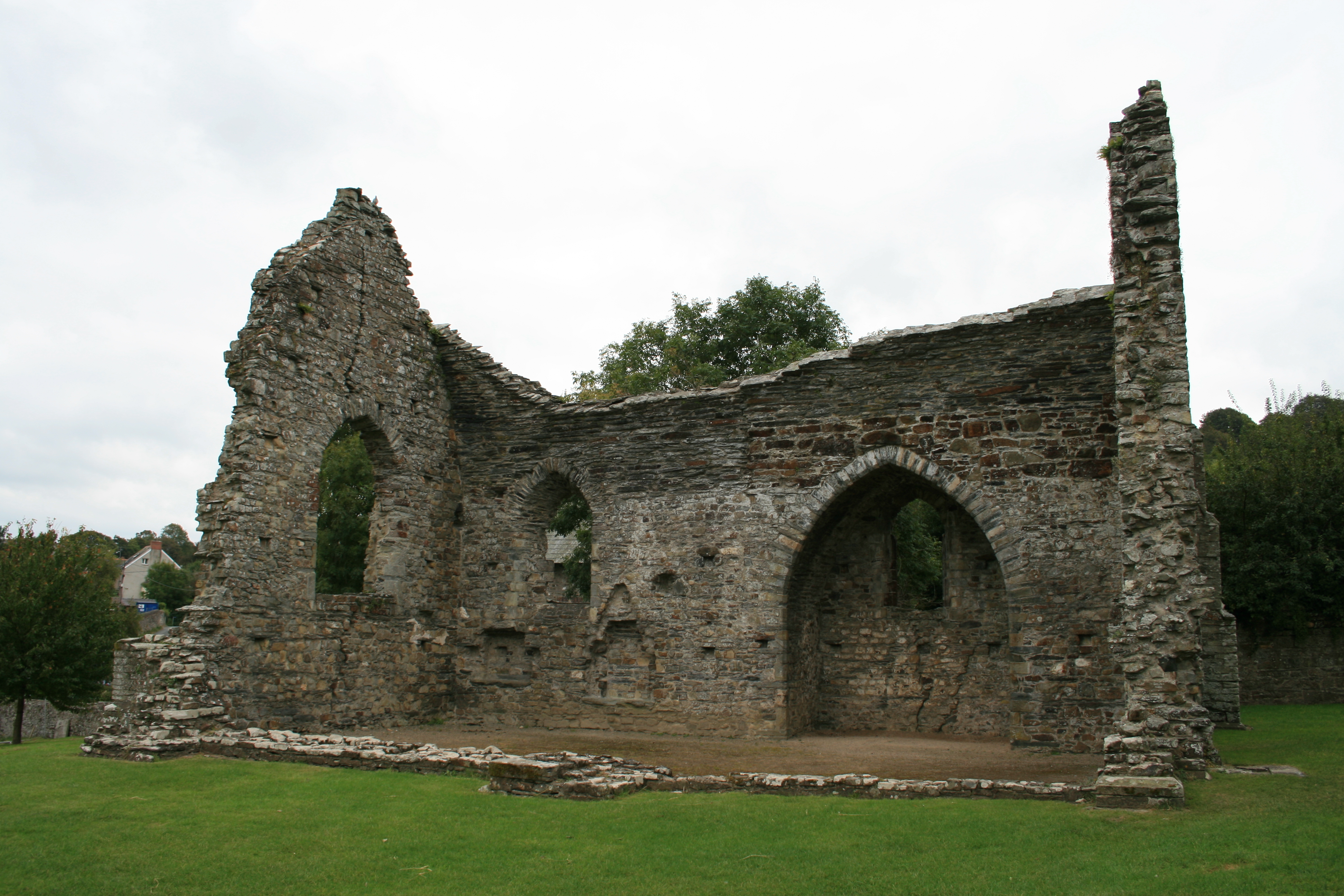
- Part of the ruins of St Dogmaels Abbey

- Location within Pembrokeshire
- Population: 1,353 (2011)
- OS grid reference: SN165459
- Community: St Dogmaels
- Principal area: Pembrokeshire
- Preserved county: Dyfed
- Country: Wales
- Sovereign state: United Kingdom
- Post town: CARDIGAN
- Postcode district: SA43
- Dialling code: 01239
- Police: Dyfed-Powys
- Fire: Mid and West Wales
- Ambulance: Welsh
- UK Parliament: Ceredigion Preseli
- Senedd Cymru – Welsh Parliament: Ceredigion Penfro
- List of places UK Wales Pembrokeshire 52.08°N 4.68°W Map of the community

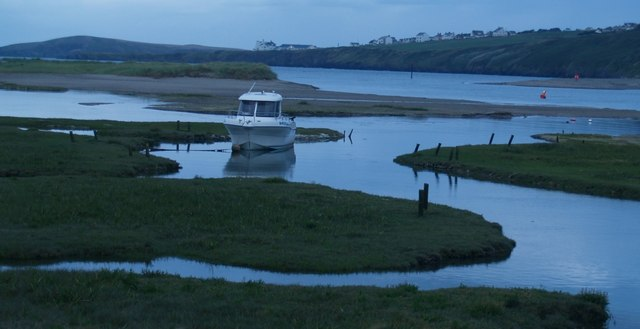
The Teifi estuary at St Dogmaels, with Gwbert in the background

St Dogmaels (Welsh: Llandudoch) is a village, parish and community in Pembrokeshire, Wales, on the estuary of the River Teifi, a mile downstream from the town of Cardigan in neighbouring Ceredigion. A little to the north of the village, further along the estuary, lies Poppit Sands beach. The parish includes the small settlement of Cippyn, south of Cemaes Head.

== Toponymy ==
The English and Welsh names seem to bear no similarity, but it has been suggested that possibly both names refer to the same saint or founder Dogmael (Dogfael), with ‘mael’ (prince) and ‘tud’ (land or people of) being added to Dog/doch as in Dog mael and Tud doch. It is the current standard usage not to have a full-stop after the 'St' or an apostrophe in 'Dogmaels'.

== History ==
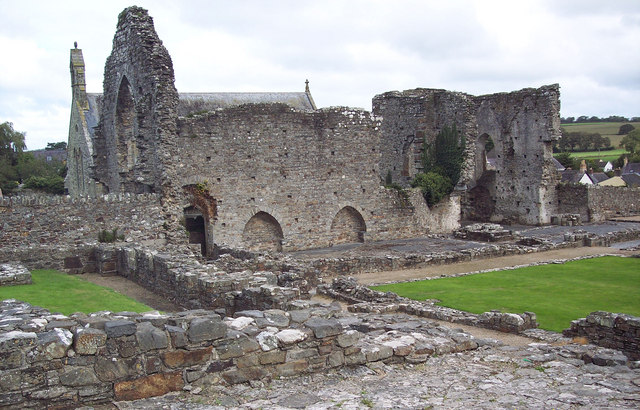
Another view of the abbey ruins

St Dogmaels Abbey is 12th-century Tironesian and was one of the richer monastic institutions in Wales. Adjacent to the abbey ruins is the parish church (Church in Wales) of St Thomas, which appears successively to have occupied at least three sites close to or within the abbey buildings. The present building is a respectable minor Victorian edifice and contains the Ogam Sagranus stone.

St Dogmaels was once a marcher borough. George Owen of Henllys, in 1603, described it as one of five Pembrokeshire boroughs overseen by a portreeve. The parish appeared (as Sct. Dogmels) on a 1578 parish map of Pembrokeshire.

In the 1830s, the population of the parish was 2,109, and it was subdivided into four hamlets: Cippyn, Abbey, Pant-y-groes and Bridgend. In 1832, the Bridgend and Abbey hamlets were included in the Cardigan constituency. The constituency boundary was subsequently also adopted for the municipal borough of Cardigan in 1836. Under the Local Government Act 1888, boroughs were no longer allowed to straddle county boundaries and so the borough of Cardigan was placed entirely in Cardiganshire, leaving St Dogmaels village and parish split between the two counties. The 19th century boundary changes were partially reversed in 2003; the Bridgend area remained in Ceredigion (as Cardiganshire had become), but the rest of the old parish of St Dogmaels was reunited as a single community in Pembrokeshire.

There are more than 30 listed buildings in the parish, including the parish church, the abbey and the mediaeval flour mill, Y Felin. Y Felin is one of the last working water mills in Wales, producing traditional stoneground flour.

In 2006, the village won the Wales Calor Village of the Year competition after beating Trefriw in the final.

== Pembrokeshire Coast Path ==
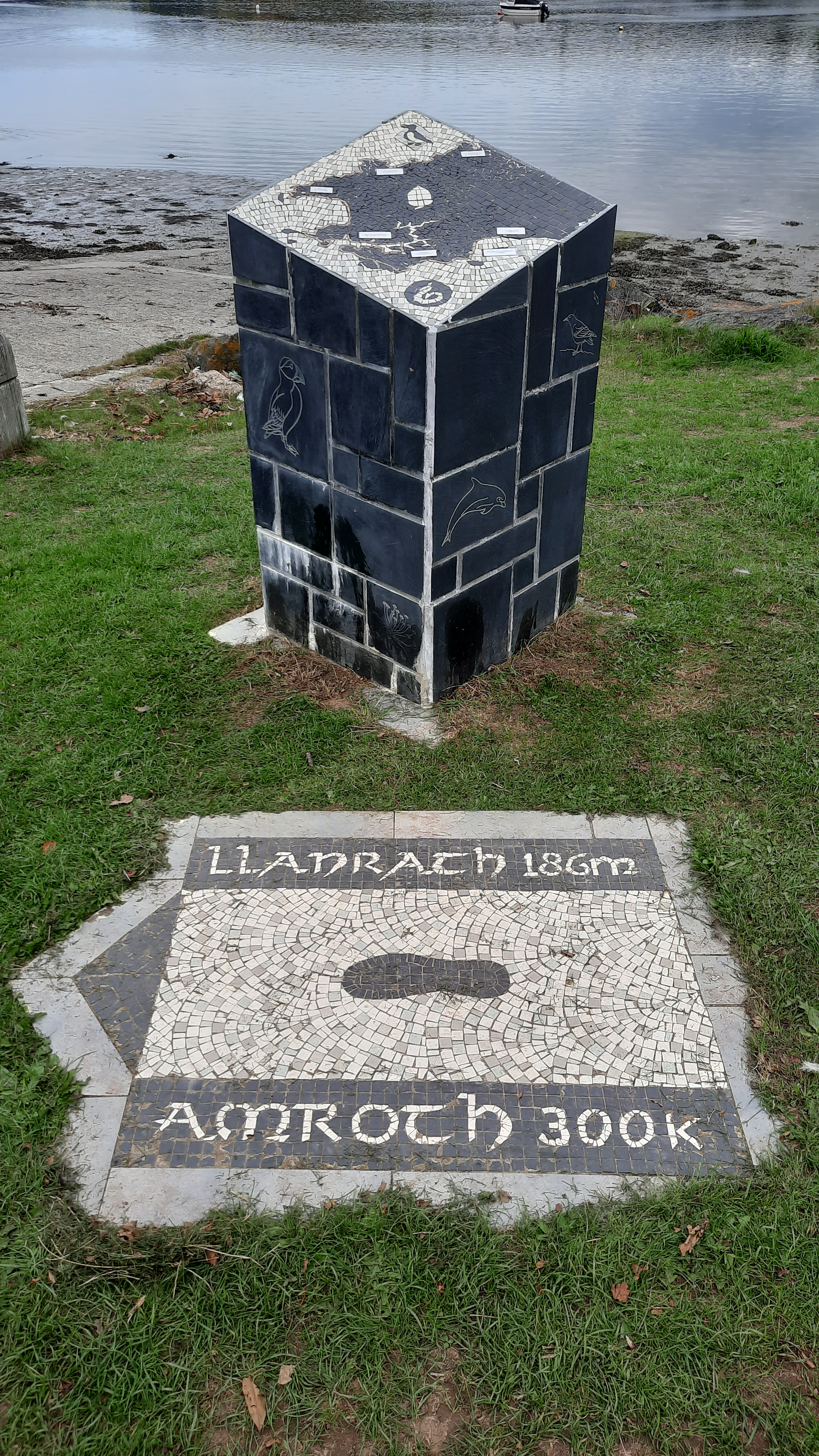
The plaque at the northern end of the Pembrokeshire Coast Path

The northern end of the Pembrokeshire Coast Path is often regarded as being at Poppit Sands, near St. Dogmaels, where the official plaque was originally sited but the path now continues to St. Dogmaels, where a new marker was unveiled in July 2009. Here the path links with the Ceredigion Coast Path, which continues northwards as part of the Wales Coast Path.

== Governance ==
An electoral ward of the same name exists, stretching to include the community of Nevern. The population taken at the 2011 census was 2,218.

== Shakespeare in St Dogmaels Abbey ==
A Shakespeare play is performed annually in the abbey during the summer since the first play was performed in 1987. The actors are both local and from all parts of Great Britain.

== Notable people ==
- Joseph Harris (1773–1825), was born at Llan-ty-ddewi, St. Dogmells. He was a Welsh Baptist minister, author, journal editor and a Welsh language poet. He took the Biblical name of Gomer as his bardic name.
- Rhodri Thomas (born 1942), born in St Dogmaels, a Welsh former first-class cricketer.

== Twinning ==
St Dogmaels is twinned with the village of Trédarzec in Côtes-d'Armor, Brittany.

== See also ==
- Albro Castle, a former workhouse
- Calor Village of the Year
- St Dogmaels F.C.
