= Rhodri Thomas =

Welsh cricketer

Personal information
- Full name: Rhodri James Alban Thomas
- Born: 13 March 1942 (age 84); St Dogmaels, Pembrokeshire, Wales
- Batting: Right-handed

Domestic team information
- Years: Team
- 1963–1965: Oxford University

Career statistics
Competition	First-class
Matches	15
Runs scored	622
Batting average	23.92
100s/50s	1/1
Top score	135*
Balls bowled	12
Wickets	1
Bowling average	5.00
5 wickets in innings	–
10 wickets in match	–
Best bowling	1/4
Catches/stumpings	10/–
- Source: Cricinfo, 25 March 2020

Rhodri James Alban Thomas (born 13 March 1942) is a Welsh former first-class cricketer.

Thomas was born at St Dogmaels, Pembrokeshire. He was educated at Radley College, before going up to Corpus Christi College, Oxford. While studying at Oxford, he played first-class cricket for Oxford University, making his debut against Warwickshire at Oxford in 1963. He played first-class cricket for Oxford until 1965, making a total of fifteen appearances. He scored a total of 622 runs in his fifteen first-class matches, at an average of 23.92 and with a high score of 135 not out. This score, which was his only first-class century, came against Northamptonshire in a high scoring match in 1963, which also saw Northamptonshire's Roger Prideaux score a double century.
