= Nevern Bridge =

Nevern Bridge Pont Nanhyfer
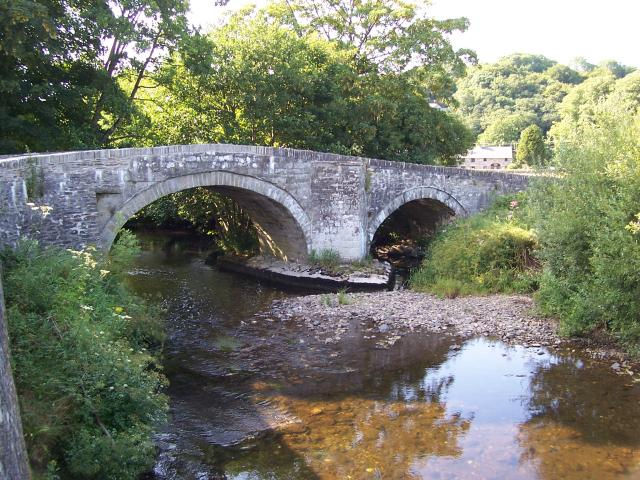
- Coordinates: 52.024°N 4.797°W
- Carries: B4582 road
- Crosses: River Nevern
- Locale: Nevern, West Wales
- Heritage status: Grade II

Characteristics
- Design: Arch bridge

Nevern Bridge (Welsh: Pont Nanhyfer) spans the River Nevern (Welsh: Afon Nyfer) in the centre of Nevern, Pembrokeshire, Wales.

This Grade II listed bridge, 220 yards (200 m) south of the church, was built in the late 18th or early 19th century. Constructed of rubblestone and ashlar, this humpback bridge has two unequal arches—the south arch is larger—and is recessed with keystones.
