= Felindre Farchog =

Village in Pembrokeshire, Wales

Coordinates: 52.0172°N 4.7695°W

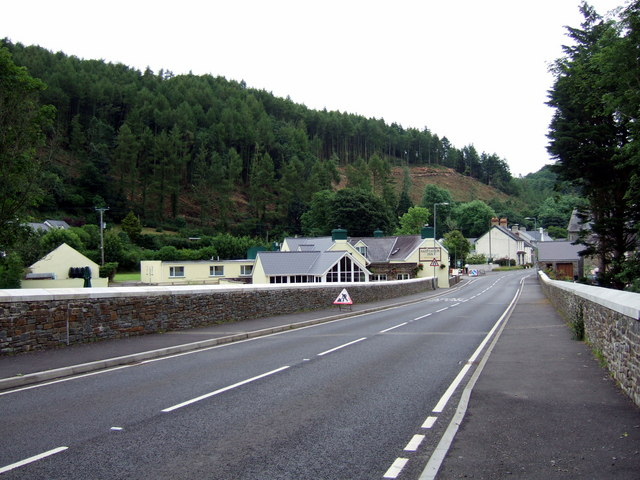
- The A487 bridge over the Nevern

- Location within Pembrokeshire
- Principal area: Pembrokeshire
- Country: Wales
- Sovereign state: United Kingdom
- Post town: Newport, Pembrokeshire
- Postcode district: SA41
- Dialling code: 01239
- Police: Dyfed-Powys
- Fire: Mid and West Wales
- Ambulance: Welsh
- UK Parliament: Preseli Pembrokeshire
- Senedd Cymru – Welsh Parliament: Preseli Pembrokeshire

Felindre Farchog (Welsh pronunciation; rough English translation: mill village of the knight, or horseman) is a small village in the community of Nevern in Pembrokeshire, Wales, located around 7 miles (11 km) south-west of Cardigan, and within the parish of Bayvil. The A487 road from Cardigan to Newport runs through the village.

The village, on the River Nevern, consists of a few houses (including eight listed buildings, one a former college) and an inn.

== History ==
There is a prehistoric earthwork in the south of the village, described as being circular and about 25m in diameter. A number of small mines used to exist to the south-west of the village.

To the east of the village the main road crosses the medieval bridge Pont Baldwyn over Nant Duad, believed to be named after Archbishop Baldwin who with Gerald of Wales campaigned and preached in the area in the late 12th century. To the west, the River Nevern is crossed by an unnamed bridge.

Felindre Farchog developed as a result of its position on the main route between the former ports of Cardigan and Newport, a road which is now part of the A487. In the 17th century the rural poor lived in earth houses, while a number of significant buildings were established nearby.

== Significant buildings ==
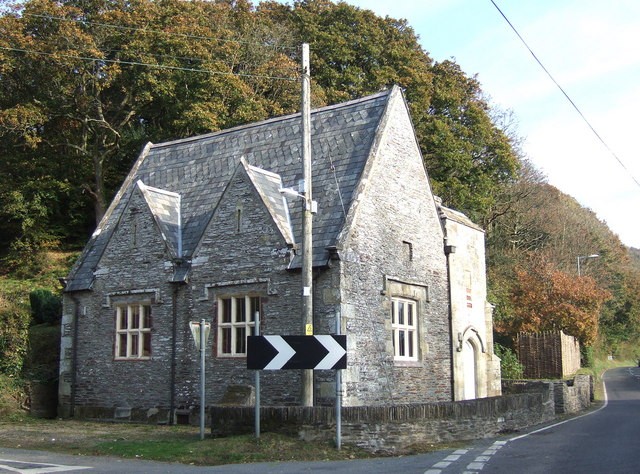
The old College/Courthouse

At the eastern end of the village is the College, a 17th-century building founded by Sir George Owen and modernised in 1852 by Sir Thomas Lloyd in Gothic style to house the Court of the Lordship of Cemais. The building became private accommodation in 1976. A few yards northeast of the College is a pair of estate cottages, numbers 1 and 2 Pendre, Henllys Road, both listed Grade II, built about 1860. No.1 retains the original sash windows.

Cwmgloyne is a 17th-century Grade II listed mansion about half a mile north of the village. The house has been much altered since. Originally an estate with lands across several parishes, the estate was broken up towards the end of the 19th century.

Yr Hen Gapel is Grade II listed as a rare example of a small early chapel. Built in 1791, it was rebuilt in 1810, converted to a Sunday School in 1857 and later in the 19th century became the vestry to Cana Chapel. Cana Chapel is a Grade II listed building built in 1810, rebuilt in 1857, and still in use in 2006.

The parish church of Saint Andrew at Bayvil, an early 19th-century Georgian building, is disused but upkept.

Wenallt is a Grade II listed farmhouse southeast of the village, listed for being a traditional 19th century farmhouse.

== Amenities ==
The Salutation Inn stands by the river in the centre of the village. It is marked on a pre-1850 parish map and is believed to be part-16th century.

National Cycle Route 82 (Bangor to Fishguard) passes through the village.

== See also ==
- Felindre, a village near to Swansea
- Dre-fach Felindre, a village in Carmarthenshire
