= Penygroes, Pembrokeshire =

Village in Pembrokeshire, Wales

Coordinates: 51.986°N 4.688°W

Penygroes
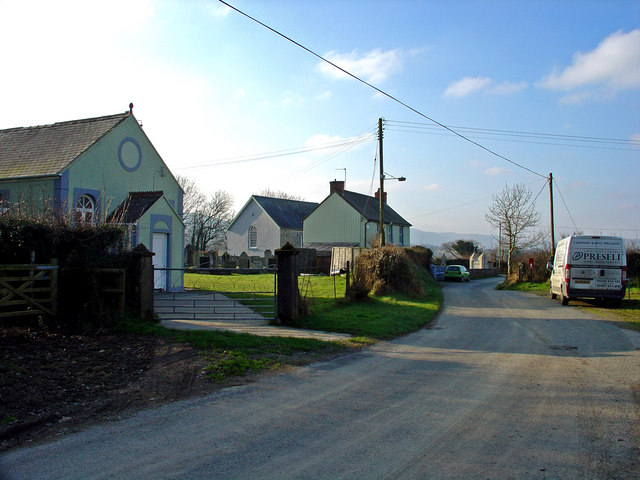
- Penygroes Chapel

- Location within Pembrokeshire
- OS grid reference: SN1535
- Community: Crymych
- Principal area: Pembrokeshire
- Country: Wales
- Sovereign state: United Kingdom
- Post town: Crymych
- Postcode district: SA41
- Dialling code: 01239
- Police: Dyfed-Powys
- Fire: Mid and West Wales
- Ambulance: Welsh
- UK Parliament: Preseli Pembrokeshire
- Senedd Cymru – Welsh Parliament: Preseli Pembrokeshire

Penygroes (Welsh pronunciation) is a scattered rural hamlet in north Pembrokeshire, Wales, in the northern foothills of the Preseli Mountains. It is in the parish of Eglwyswen, the community of Crymych and the Pembrokeshire Coast National Park.

== Description ==
Penygroes is a scattered hamlet at about 150 metres (490 ft) in elevation, with a few dwellings and farms, in a broad valley under the northern edge of the Preseli Mountains.

== Agriculture ==
In the west of the hamlet, on the parish boundary with Meline, was a woollen factory close to the brook known as Afon Clun-maen which rises in the mountains and flows northwards past a farm now known as Glynmaen. At one time it would have been active at shearing time for the sheep that have been grazed on the unenclosed moorland to the south for centuries.

== Chapel ==
The congregation, established before 1800, is in the Union of Welsh Independent churches. An 1871 history of the Welsh independent churches puts the date of the foundation of the congregation in Penygroes at 1765, but the chapel was not built until 1828; prior to that, worship took place at Cilcam. The history lists the preachers, in a few cases in some detail.
