= Mount Killaraus =

Legendary hill or mountain in Ireland

In Arthurian legend, Mount Killaraus (Latin: mons Killaraus) is a legendary place in Ireland where Stonehenge originally stood. According to the narrative presented in Geoffrey of Monmouth's Historia Regum Britanniae, King Ambrosius Aurelianus embarks on a quest to construct a memorial for the Celtic Britons who were treacherously slain by Anglo-Saxons. When conventional methods fail to produce an awe-inspiring monument, Ambrosius turns to the renowned wizard Merlin for guidance. In response, Merlin advises the king to transport a stone circle known as the Giant's Ring from Mount Killaraus in Ireland, attributing magical and healing properties to these stones, which were believed to have been brought from Africa by giants.

This prompts Uther Pendragon to lead an expedition to Ireland, where a battle against the Irish king Gillomanius ensues, resulting in the successful retrieval of the stones with Merlin's magical assistance. While the story itself is fictional, archaeological research by Mike Parker Pearson suggests intriguing connections between Stonehenge and the Waun Mawn stone circle in Wales, indicating the potential for a historical basis within the legendary narrative.

== Merlin legend ==
The first record of the Merlin story is in Geoffrey of Monmouth's 12th century Historia Regum Britanniae ('History of the Kings of Britain'). It tells how king Aurelius Ambrosius sought to build a memorial to the Celtic Britons who were treacherously slain by Anglo-Saxons.

When his carpenters and masons cannot come up with a suitably awe-inspiring monument, Ambrosius asks the wizard Merlin for advice. Merlin tells the king to transport a stone circle called the Giant's Ring from Mount Killaraus in Ireland. He says they are magical healing stones that had been brought from Africa by giants.

Uther Pendragon sails to Ireland with 15,000 men to retrieve the stones. The Irish king Gillomanius marches against them with a large army, but is defeated. With Merlin's help, the Britons transport the stones to Britain and set them up as they had originally stood.

== Possible original ==
=== Hill of Uisneach, Ireland ===
The name mons Killaraus could mean the "hill of Killare" and thus may refer to the Hill of Uisneach. This is an ancient ceremonial site with numerous prehistoric monuments, which was seen as the sacred centre of Ireland.

=== Waun Mawn circle, Wales ===
Many of Stonehenge's original bluestones have been traced to quarries in the Preseli Hills, in west Wales.

Although the Merlin tale is fiction, archaeologist Mike Parker Pearson suggests that there may be a "tiny grain of truth" in it.

Pearson's team of archaeologists found evidence suggesting that most of the Waun Mawn stone circle in the Preseli Hills was taken down and brought to Salisbury Plain, where it became the first phase of Stonehenge.
