= Waun Mawn =

Dismantled neolithic stone circle in Pembrokeshire,

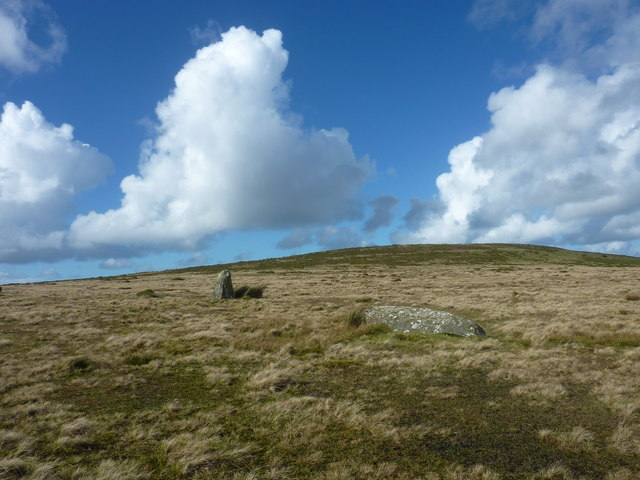
- Standing stone and prostrate stone near Cnwc yr Hŷdd, Waun Mawn in October 2012

- Location within Pembrokeshire
- 51.9716°N 4.7912°W
- Type: Stone circle
- Location: Wales, United Kingdom

History
- Built: c. 3300 BC
- Abandoned: c. 2150 BC

Site notes
- Diameter: c. 110 meters
- Archaeologists: Mike Parker Pearson

Waun Mawn (Welsh for "peat moor") is a megalithic site in the Preseli Mountains of Pembrokeshire, Wales. Following excavations in 2018, it became the site of a supposed dismantled Neolithic stone circle. The diameter of the postulated circle was estimated to be 110 m (360 ft), making it the fifth largest diameter for a British stone circle, after Avebury (331.6 m (1,088 ft)), Stanton Drew (113 m (371 ft)), Karl Lofts (estimated 122 m (400 ft)), Long Meg (maximum 120 m (390 ft)), and slightly larger than the Ring of Brodgar (104 m (341 ft)).

The site is located around 1 mile (1.6 km) to the southwest of Brynberian. This tract of moorland sits on the southern slopes of the 339 m (1,112 ft) hill top of Cnwc yr Hŷdd ("cock of the corn"), just to the north of the broad east–west ridge of the Preseli range.

There are four stones at the site today, one standing and three prostrate. Nearby are the Troed y Rhiw ("foot of the hillside") standing stones and to the west of the main group is another solitary standing stone, the 'Waun Mawn Stone', measuring some 2.3 m (7 ft 7 in) high.

== Research, analysis and theories ==
During 2017 and 2018, excavations by the UCL team of archaeologist Mike Parker Pearson led to a proposal that the site had originally housed a 110 m (360 ft) diameter stone circle of the same size as the ditch at Stonehenge. The archaeologists also postulated that the circle also contained a hole from one stone which had a distinctive pentagonal shape, very closely matching the one pentagonal stone at Stonehenge (stonehole 91 at Waun Mawn and stone 62 at Stonehenge). Both circles appear, according to some researchers, to be oriented towards the midsummer solstice.

Following soil dating of the sediments within the postulated stone holes, via optically stimulated luminescence (OSL), it has been argued, by Parker Pearson, that the circle of stones was built c. 3400–3200 BC and then, before 2120 BC, was disassembled, dragged across land and reassembled at Stonehenge in Wiltshire, some 140 mi (230 km) distant. Parker Pearson's proposals have been published in the journal Antiquity. This postulated migration of the stones was likened by the researchers to the story told by Geoffrey of Monmouth, in his 12th-century History of the Kings of Britain, of Merlin taking the stones of the Giant's Dance circle in Ireland to Stonehenge.

The site and its connection with Stonehenge was the subject of the BBC Two programme, Stonehenge: The Lost Circle Revealed, with Parker Pearson and Professor Alice Roberts. Broadcast was on 12 February 2021, and reported in New Scientist on 20 February 2021.

Work in 2021 led Pearson and his colleagues to conclude that only 30% of the proposed stone circle at Waun Mawn had been completed, but that perhaps as many as 17 stones had been erected so between eight and 13 had been removed in antiquity, far fewer than the perhaps 80 bluestones that once stood at Stonehenge. That work uncovered no new evidence connecting Waun Mawn and Stonehenge.

Two geological articles published in 2022 proved that there was no link between Waun Mawn and the supposed "bluestone quarries" at Craig Rhosyfelin and Carn Goedog, and no link between Waun Mawn and Stonehenge. In a 2024 study published in The Holocene, Brian John re-examined the geological and archaeological evidence from the site, and concluded that the "lost circle" of standing stones had never existed, and that there was no evidence to demonstrate a link with Stonehenge. He concluded that there had been considerable "interpretative inflation" at the site, driven by a desire to show a Stonehenge connection.
