= Meline, Pembrokeshire =

Parish in Pembrokeshire, Wales

Coordinates: 52.0162°N 4.7427°W

Meline
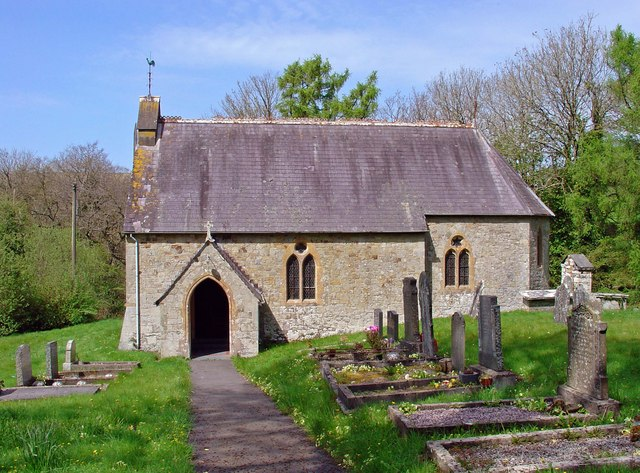
- Church of St Dogfael

- Location within Pembrokeshire
- OS grid reference: SN118388
- Principal area: Pembrokeshire
- Country: Wales
- Sovereign state: United Kingdom
- Post town: Crymych
- Postcode district: SA41
- Police: Dyfed-Powys
- Fire: Mid and West Wales
- Ambulance: Welsh
- UK Parliament: Preseli Pembrokeshire
- Senedd Cymru – Welsh Parliament: Preseli Pembrokeshire

Meline (also recorded as Meliney and Melinau) is a parish in the Diocese of St Davids in north Pembrokeshire, Wales. There is no settlement of this name.

== History ==
While there is no settlement called Meline, the name may refer to a mill on one of the rivers that run through the north of the parish, including the Nevern and Brynberian. Meline (as Malenay) appears on a 1578 parish map of Pembrokeshire. The parish was in the ancient Hundred of Cemais and in 1833 was described as including some ancient mansions as well as prehistoric features. In 1835 the parish had a population of 492 of which 30 or 40 attended Sunday School in the summer months. By the 1870s the population had fallen to 414 people, living in 108 houses and fell to below 300 in the mid-20th century. At the turn of the 20th century Meline was sharing a Board School with Whitechurch (Eglwyswen).

== Parish ==
The parish, with an area of 4,523 acres (1,830 ha), includes the hamlet of Crosswell, a number of other minor settlements and farms, and extends southwards into the Preseli Mountains. It is mostly within the Pembrokeshire Coast National Park.

The former parish church, in the northern tip of the parish, is dedicated to St Dogmael (or Dogfael) and is a Grade-II listed building. It was built in 1865, replacing an earlier structure, possibly 13th century, some of which was incorporated into the present church, including the font.

In 2017, the church was vested in the care of Friends of Friendless Churches, a charity that rescues redundant churches across England and Wales.

A carved pew back from the earlier church is preserved at Penbenglog nearby, bearing the inscription (in Latin) "The pew of Matilda, wife of George Perrott, of Penybenglog, gentleman, 1626". Penbenglog is a Grade-II listed house dating from the early 17th century, with earlier origins, and one of the oldest continuously-occupied sites in north Pembrokeshire.

== Notable people ==
Benjamin Evans (minister) (1740–1821) was born in the parish.
