= Moylgrove =

Village and parish in Pembrokeshire, Wales

Coordinates: 52.07°N 4.75°W

Moylgrove: Welsh: Trewyddel
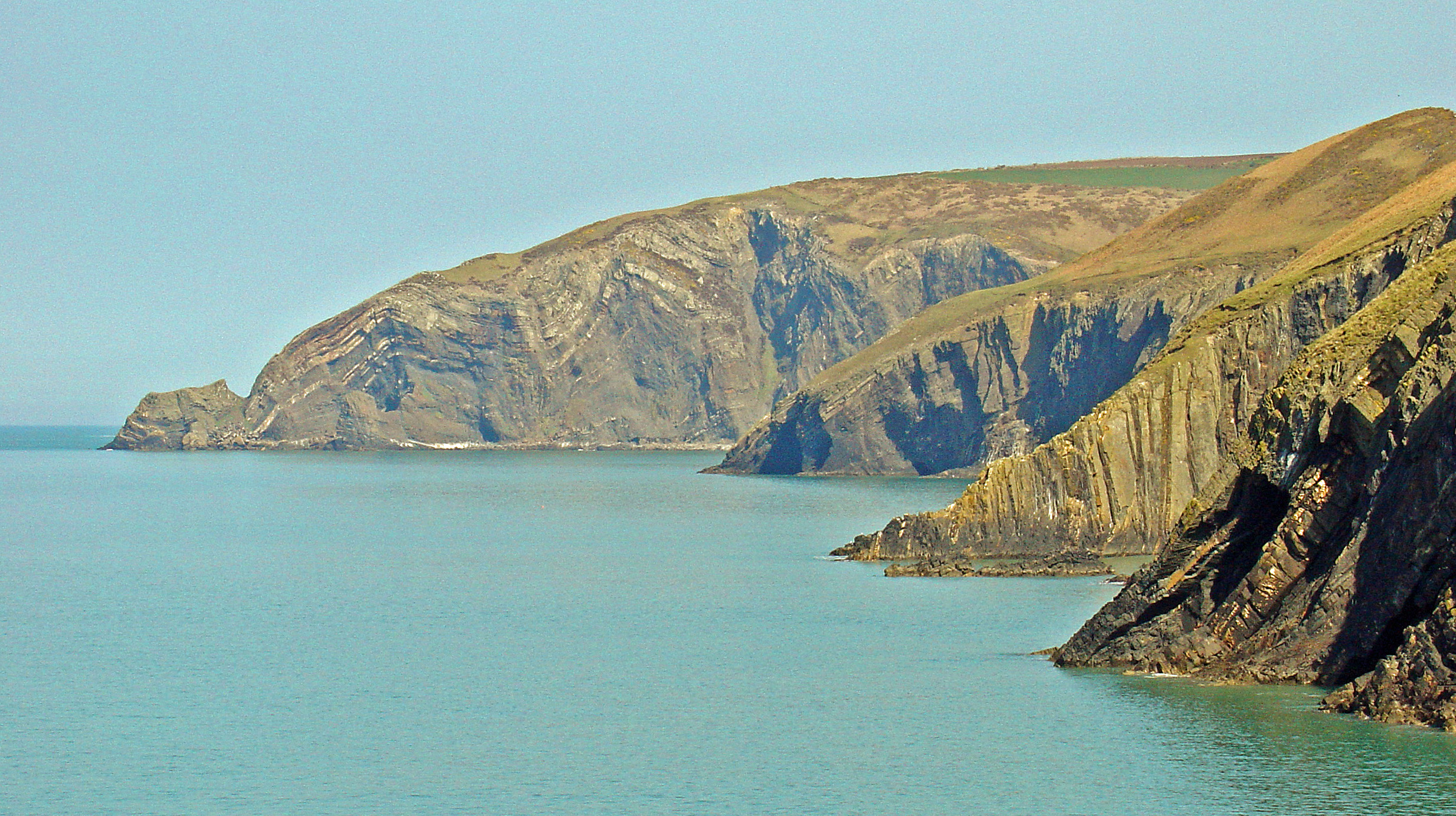
- Cliffs at Ceibwr, where Nant Ceibwr flows out to sea

- Location within Pembrokeshire
- OS grid reference: SN117447
- Principal area: Pembrokeshire
- Country: Wales
- Sovereign state: United Kingdom
- Police: Dyfed-Powys
- Fire: Mid and West Wales
- Ambulance: Welsh

Moylgrove (Welsh: Trewyddel), also spelled Moylegrove, is a village and parish in north Pembrokeshire, Wales, about 4 miles (6.4 km) from Cardigan, in the community of Nevern.

== Description ==
The placename "Moylegrove" means "Matilda's Grove"; "Matilda" may have been the wife of a Norman lord of the manor. The Welsh placename may mean "Irishman's farm" or "grove farm".

The parish is in the Pembrokeshire Coast National Park, and its population is predominantly Welsh-speaking. The village lies in the valley of Nant Ceibwr, about 1.5 kilometres (0.93 mi) from its outlet into the Irish Sea at Ceibwr Bay.

Ceibwr Bay, owned by the National Trust and on the Pembrokeshire Coast Path, is a favourite walking and picnicking site for both locals and holiday makers, with spectacular cliff scenery.

== History ==
The Welsh name of the parish, Trevethel, appears on a 1578 parish map of Pembrokeshire.

Moylgrove was described by Samuel Lewis in 1833 as a parish of enclosed arable land and pasture with some 400 inhabitants. It is served by the church of St Andrew and Mynno which is about half a mile to the east of the village centre. Bethel Independent chapel was built in the village before 1800 (possibly as early as 1691) and rebuilt from 1850; a Baptist chapel was built in 1894. At that time the parish was in the Hundred of Cemais and the commote of Is Nyfer.

== Leisure ==
- This location is used for watersports activities such as coasteering and sea kayaking, in which the participants may encounter the local wildlife.
- There is a short cliff walk to the Witches Cauldron where seals, choughs and bottlenose dolphins can occasionally be seen. The Witches Cauldron is a collapsed cave which is fed by the tide and sometimes accessed by kayaking groups.
