= River Nevern =

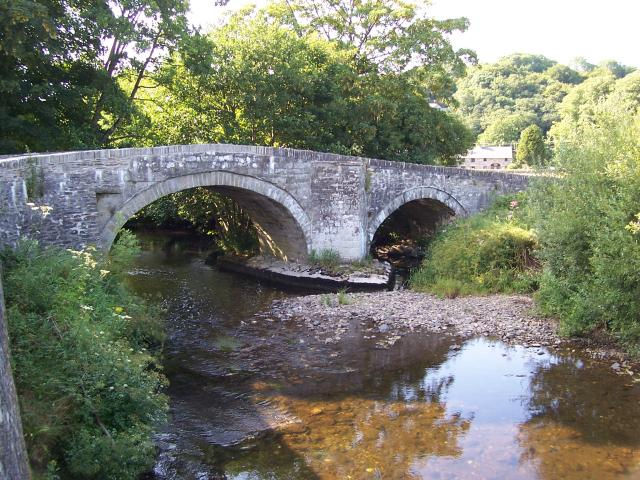
- Native name: Afon Nyfer (Welsh)

Location
- Country: Wales
- Counties: Pembrokeshire
- Villages: Felindre Farchog, Nevern

Physical characteristics
- Source
  - location: northeast of Crymych
  - coordinates: 51.9841°N 4.6249°W
- Mouth
  - location: Newport, Pembrokeshire
  - coordinates: 52.02245°N 4.8446°W
- Length: 18 km (11 mi)

The River Nevern (Welsh: Afon Nyfer) is a river in Pembrokeshire, Wales. Its source is north of the village of Crymych and its length is about 11 miles (18 km) to its estuary at Newport, Pembrokeshire.

== Course ==
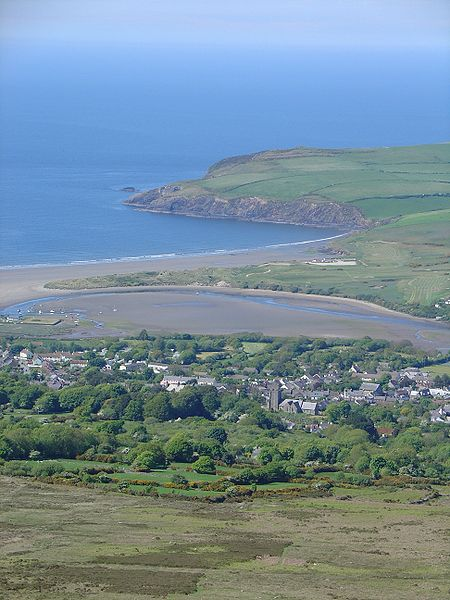
Nevern estuary

The source of the river is a spring on the southwest slope of Frenni Fawr, near Crymych. It flows southwest for a short distance, then to the north and then generally west, skirting the northern slopes of the Preseli Hills.

Principal tributaries are Afon Bannon (L - i.e. left, facing downstream), Afon Brynberian (L) and Nant Duad (R).

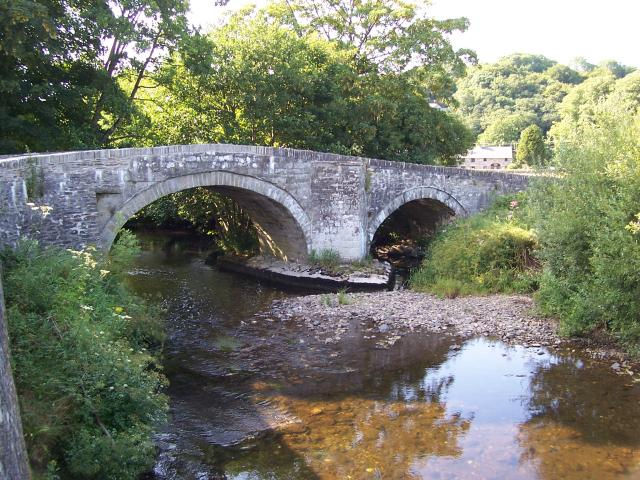
Nevern Bridge

The river is bridged by several lanes and the B4329 Eglwyswrw to Crosswell road before passing beneath the A487 at Felindre Farchog. It is bridged by the B4582 at the Grade II-listed Nevern Bridge, then winds along wooded valleys until reaching its estuary at Newport, where it is bridged for the final time at Feidr Pen-y-Bont. The river discharges into the sea at Newport's old port area of Parrog where it is possible to ford the river on foot, with caution, at low tide.

== History ==
Historically, the river was an important boundary, dividing the Hundred and Cantref of Cemais into the commotes of Cemais Is Nyfer (to the north) and Cemais Uwch Nyfer (to the south).

== Fishing ==
It is significant for trout, sewin and salmon.
