= Crosswell =

Village in Pembrokeshire, Wales

Coordinates: 51.99°N 4.73°W

Crosswell: Welsh: Ffynnongroes
- Location within Pembrokeshire
- OS grid reference: SN1236
- Community: Eglwyswrw
- Principal area: Pembrokeshire
- Country: Wales
- Sovereign state: United Kingdom
- Postcode district: SA
- Police: Dyfed-Powys
- Fire: Mid and West Wales
- Ambulance: Welsh

Crosswell (Welsh: Ffynnon-groes) is a hamlet on the B4329 road in the community of Eglwyswrw, Pembrokeshire, Wales, in the parish of Meline. It is 7 miles (11 km) southwest of Cardigan, 17 miles (27 km) northeast of Haverfordwest and 11 miles (18 km) east of Fishguard.

== Description ==
The hamlet is on a junction of several minor roads that intersect with the B4329, the former “great road” between Haverfordwest and Cardigan. Crosswell is in the parish of Meline, the greater part of which is in the Preseli Mountains, and is in the community of Eglwyswrw.

== History ==
=== Name ===
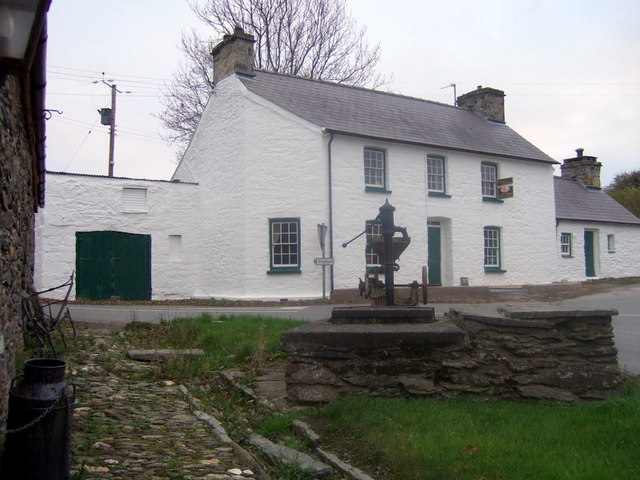
The well at Crosswell and the former inn beyond

The hamlet's name is from the Welsh: ffynnon (well) and groes (cross).

=== Inn ===
An inn once stood in the centre of the hamlet; not on the 1842 parish tithe map (though marked on pre-1850 parish maps), the inn is on the 1891 Ordnance Survey map as the Cwmgloyne Arms. The name may originate with Cwmgloyne, a mansion near Hen-llys, and the home of the antiquarian Thomas Lloyd who "dying as a bachelor, left his estate by will to Maurice Williams". Now a private dwelling called Ty Ffynnongroes (Crosswell House), the former inn was Grade II listed in 1997.

=== Bridge ===
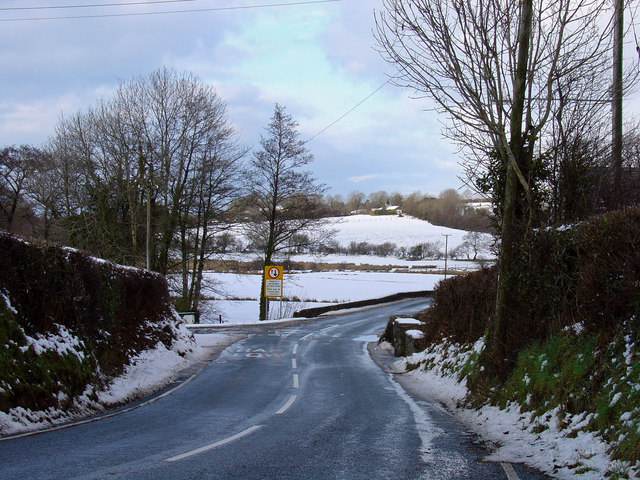
Pont Gynon in the snow

A stone, single-lane bridge crosses the River Nevern and adjacent water meadows to the north of the hamlet. The bridge is named Pontgynon (also recorded as Pantgynon or Pontcynon) and has existed at least since the early 17th century, but has been rebuilt since. The bridge and a 19th-century boundary stone set into the parapet were Grade II listed in 1997.

=== Chapel ===
An Independent chapel was built near the bridge in 1839, rebuilt in 1882 and added to subsequently.

=== Former shop ===
Until at least about the 1920s there was a shop in Crosswell, called the Royal Oak Shop.

== Amenities ==
Crosswell Village Hall was built in the 1950s.
