= Nevern =

Village, parish and community in Pembrokeshire, Wales

Nevern: Welsh: Nanhyfer
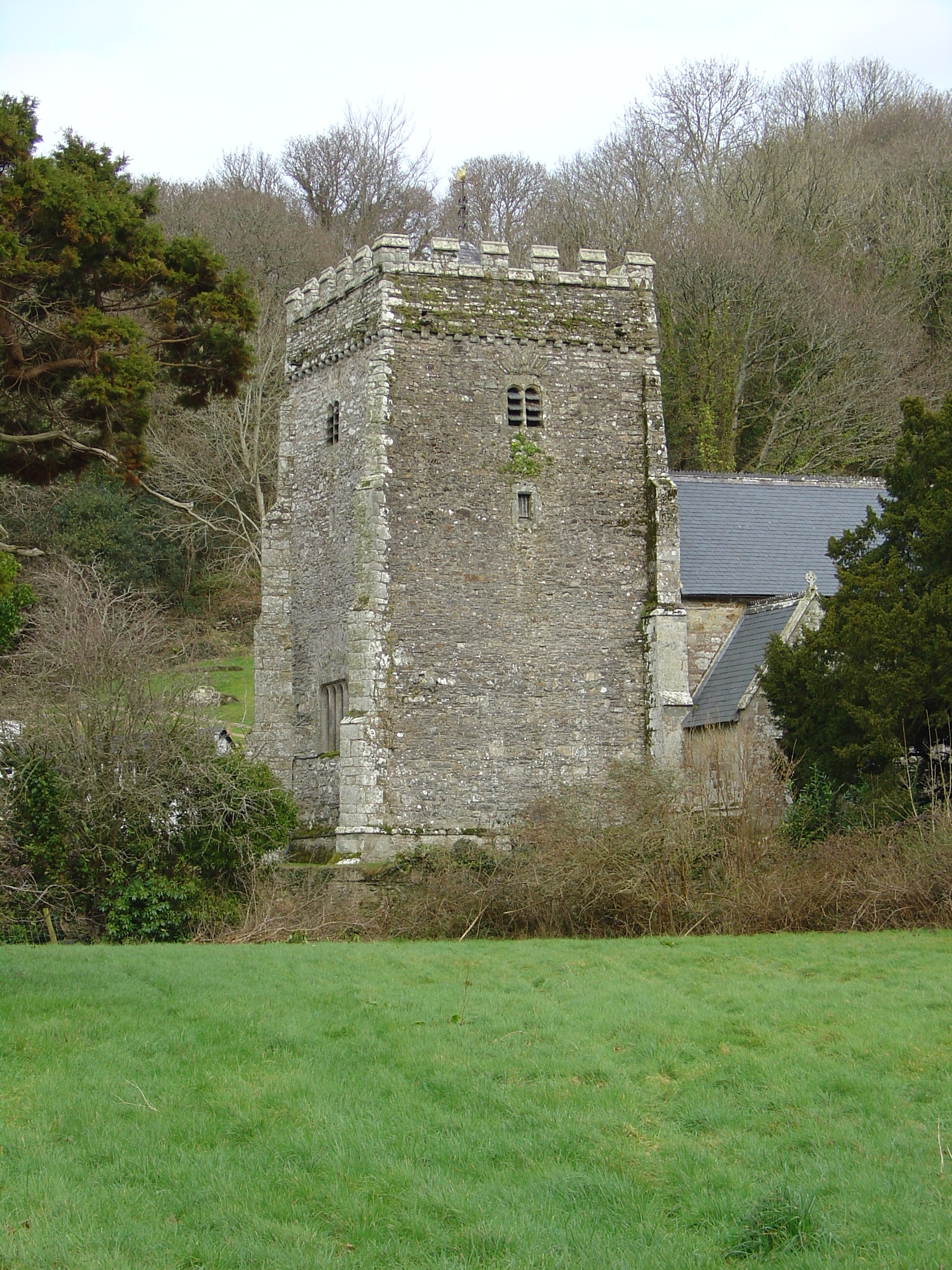
- St Brynach's Church

- Location within Pembrokeshire
- Population: 865 (2011)
- OS grid reference: SN082400
- Community: Nevern
- Principal area: Pembrokeshire
- Country: Wales
- Sovereign state: United Kingdom
- Post town: Newport
- Postcode district: SA42 0
- Dialling code: 01239
- Police: Dyfed-Powys
- Fire: Mid and West Wales
- Ambulance: Welsh
- UK Parliament: Preseli Pembrokeshire
- Senedd Cymru – Welsh Parliament: Ceredigion Penfro
- List of places UK Wales Pembrokeshire 52.02°N 4.80°W Map of the community

Nevern (Welsh: Nanhyfer) is both a parish and a community in Pembrokeshire, Wales. The community includes the settlements of Felindre Farchog, Monington, Moylgrove and Bayvil. The small village lies in the Nevern valley near the Preseli Hills of the Pembrokeshire Coast National Park 2 miles (3 km) east of Newport on the B4582 road.

== History ==
=== Neolithic ===
The area around Nevern has been occupied since at least neolithic times (about 4,000 years ago); evidence includes barrows revealed in an aerial survey during the 2018 heatwave.

=== Norman rule ===
When the ruler of Deheubarth, Rhys ap Tewdwr, died in battle and his lands were forfeited to the Normans, Martin de Turribus became the Marcher Lord of Kemes, with his caput at Nevern, where he took over an existing fortification.

=== Norman castle ===
The early 12th century Nevern Castle stood on a spur of the hill northwest of the church. Under Martin's son, Robert fitz Martin, it was the only Norman castle to successfully resist the forces of Rhys ap Gruffydd's sons, who were trying to re-establish Deheubarth. Robert's son William later established peace with Rhys ap Gruffydd by marrying his daughter, Angharad. The castle changed hands several times over the following 80 years, and was eventually destroyed by Hywel Sais in 1195. In 1197, Robert and Angharad's son, William Fitz Martin founded Newport, and built a castle there, abandoning Nevern. In modern times little remains of the castle, but the site has been extensively excavated. It was probably a square building with a bastion at each corner, and may have been one of the earliest stone castles built in Wales.

=== Land ownership ===
Although the local area is not mentioned, an allegorical poem in the 13th century Black Book of Carmarthen has been extrapolated by some writers to conclude that the area must have once been under the rule of Cuhelyn the Bard, a descendant of whom was later granted land in the nearby Preseli Hills by charter.

In 1603, the antiquarian George Owen, Lord of Cemais, described Nevern as one of nine Pembrokeshire "boroughs in decay".

== Nevern Bridge ==
Nevern Bridge spans the River Nevern in the centre of the village. The current bridge was built in the late 18th or early 19th century and is a Grade II listed structure. It has two unequal arches, recessed with keystones.

== Parish ==
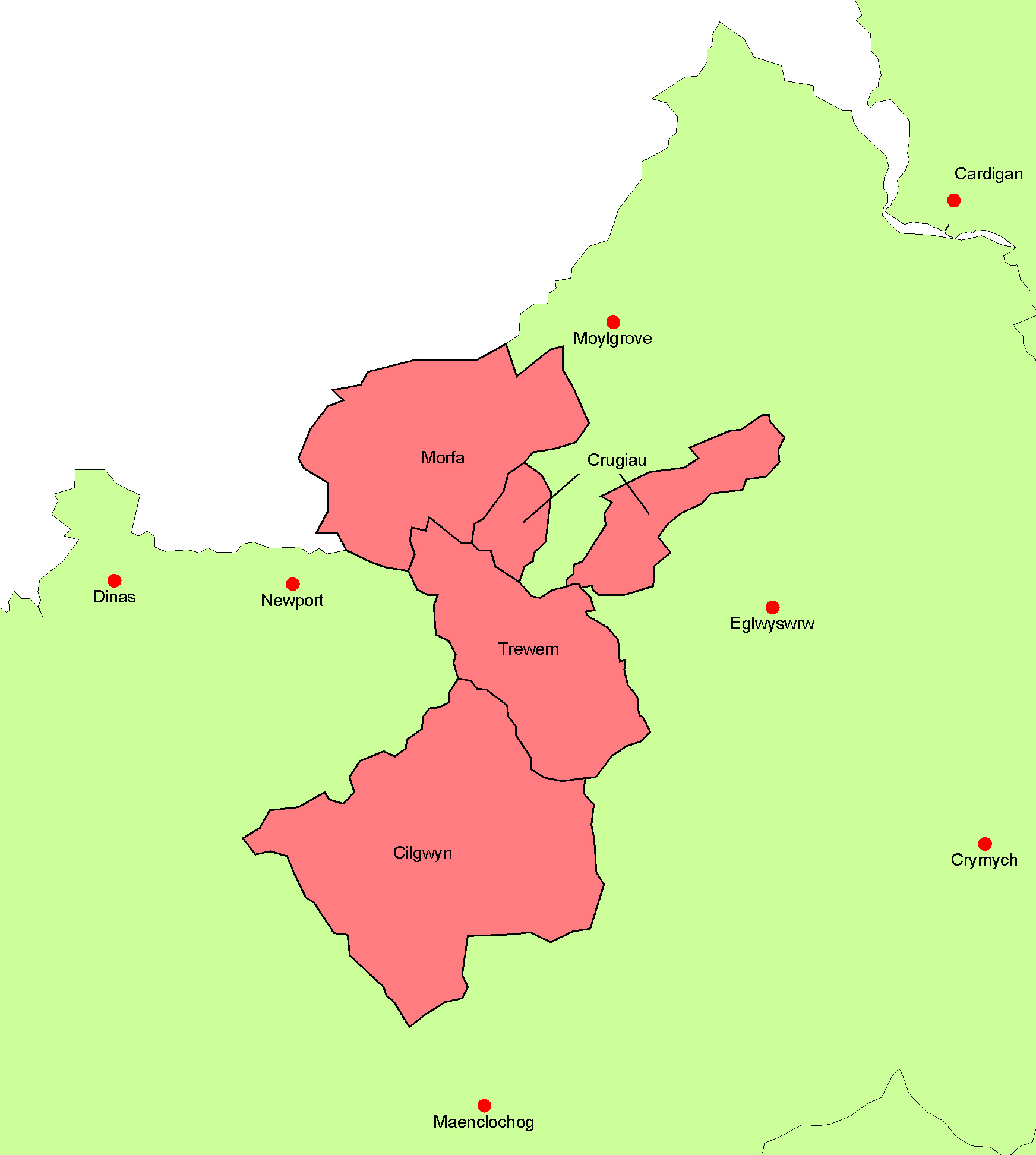
The parish of Nevern and its Quarters

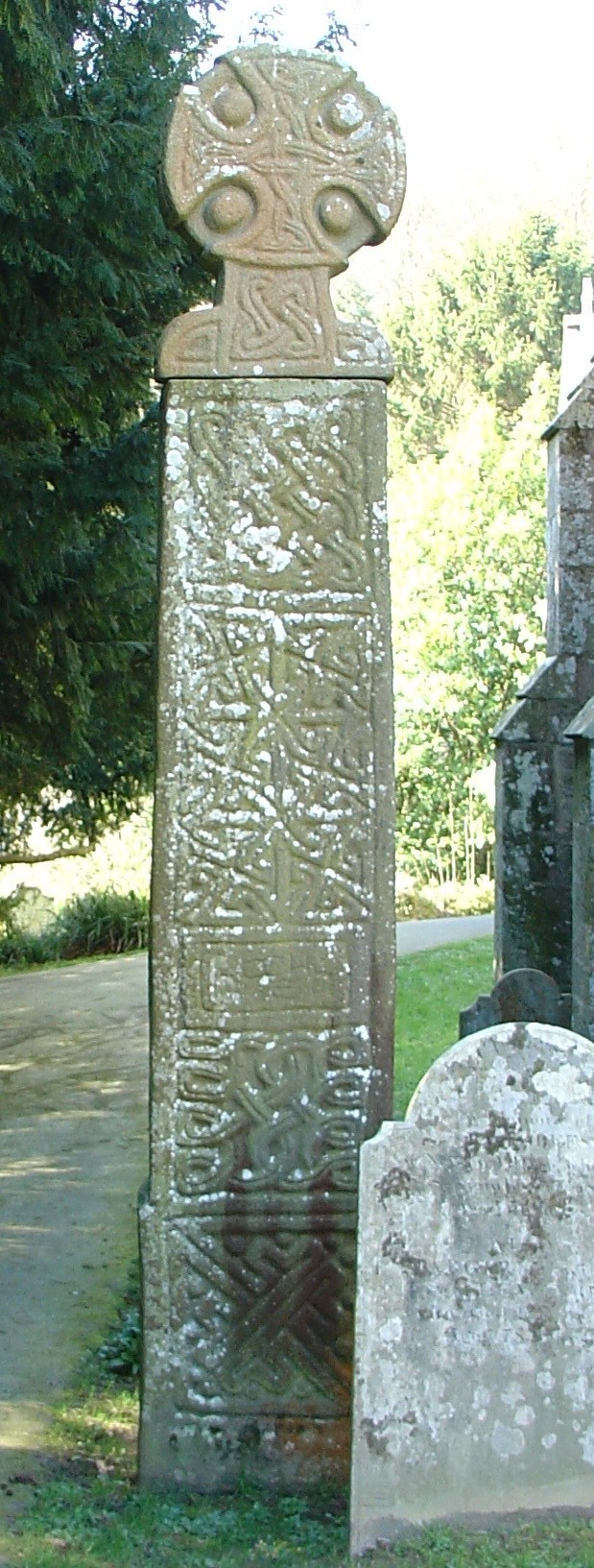
Nevern's 10th century Celtic cross

The parish of Nevern was the largest in Pembrokeshire at 5,963 hectares (14,730 acres), and was divided into four "quarters": Crugiau, Morfa, Trewern and Cilgwyn. Cilgwyn extends to the south side of the Preseli Hills; a 1578 map in the British Library shows Kilgwin as a separate parish, and also Neverne, but the other quarters are not shown. Before becoming a quarter of Nevern parish, Cilgwyn was reduced from a parish to a chapelry, dedicated to St Mary. Nevern parish church (see below) is in Crugiau Quarter.

In 1833 the population of the parish, at 1,558 inhabitants, was nearly twice that of 2011. Nevern is slightly more than 2 miles (3.2 km) from Newport, Pembrokeshire.

=== Parish Church ===
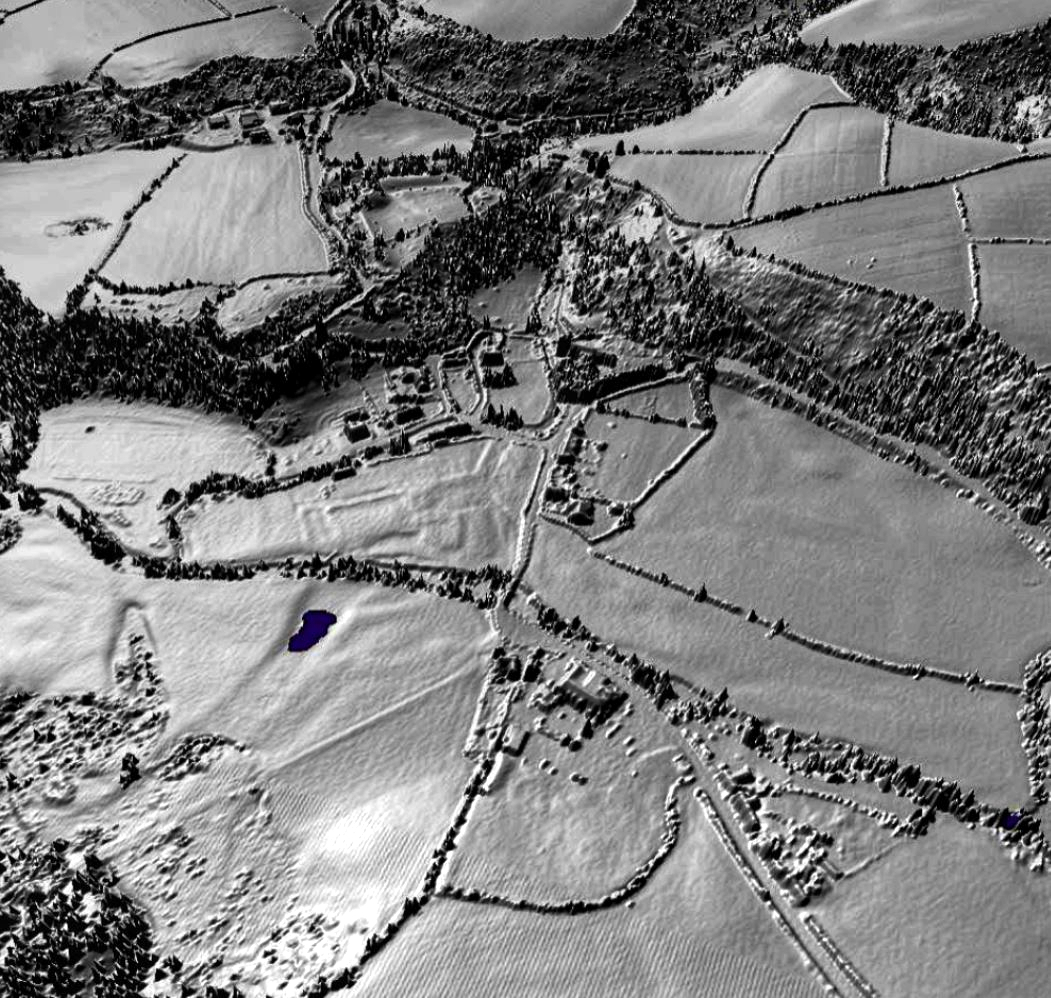
A lidar view of Nevern

The Norman Church of St Brynach is on the site of St Brynach's 6th century "clas", an important ecclesiastical centre. At the time when it is said that Dyfed had seven bishops, this was probably the seat of one. Except for the castellated tower, perilously undercut by the adjacent river Caman, most of the original Norman structure of the present building has been rebuilt. The church and churchyard are remarkable for the Celtic Cross, several inscribed stones and an avenue of yew trees. The church is a Grade II* listed building, as are more than 60 other listed buildings in the community. The churchyard is designated at Grade II on the Cadw/ICOMOS Register of Parks and Gardens of Special Historic Interest in Wales.

In the churchyard is a "bleeding yew" that leaks red sap at certain times of the year. George Owen is buried here, and is commemorated by a plaque in the Henllys Chapel behind the organ.

== Historical remains ==
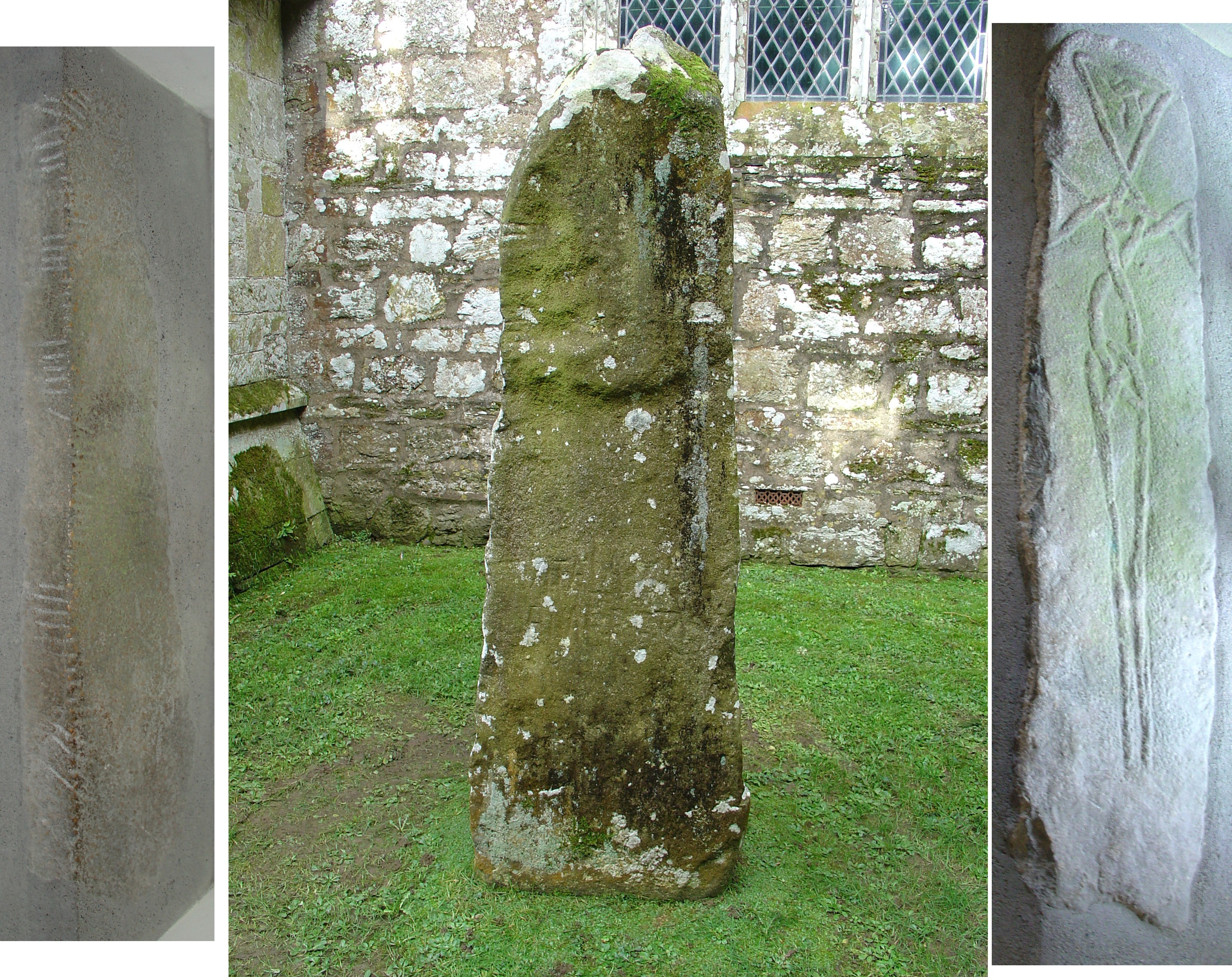
(left) the Maglocunus Stone, (centre) the Vitalianus Stone, (right) the braided cross

The Nevern Cross on the south side of the church dates from the 10th century or early 11th century. It consists of two sections fitted together with a mortice and tenon joint, both cut from the local dolerite stone. It has classic braided decorations and inscriptions reading "dns" on one side and "h.an.eh" on the other. Nearby is the Vitalianus Stone, dating from around 500 AD, inscribed in Latin "VITALIANI EMERTO" and in Ogham "vitaliani". In the Trewern Chapel in the south transept, two inscribed stones are set into the window sills. The Maglocunus Stone is inscribed in Latin "MAGLOCUNI FILI CLUTORI" and in Ogham "maglicunas maqi clutar.." and is of the 5th century or early 6th century. The Braided Cross is of the early 10th century. There is a Pilgrim's Cross cut into the rock on the roadside between the village and the castle. Dyfed Archaeological Trust has carried out excavations at the castle site. The Pentre Ifan dolmen and the Castell Henllys hillfort are in the parish, each about 2 miles (3.2 km) from the village. The dolmen is under the care of Cadw, the Welsh Historic Monuments Agency.

== Notable people ==
- George Owen of Henllys (1552–1613), a Welsh antiquarian, author, and naturalist; born in Henllys.
- George Owen (died 1665), a Welsh officer of arms and York herald from 1633; born at Henllys.
- Joshua Hughes (1807–1889), born in Nevern, Bishop of St Asaph.
