= Cemais (Dyfed) =

Welsh medieval cantref

Coordinates: 52.0°N 4.8°W

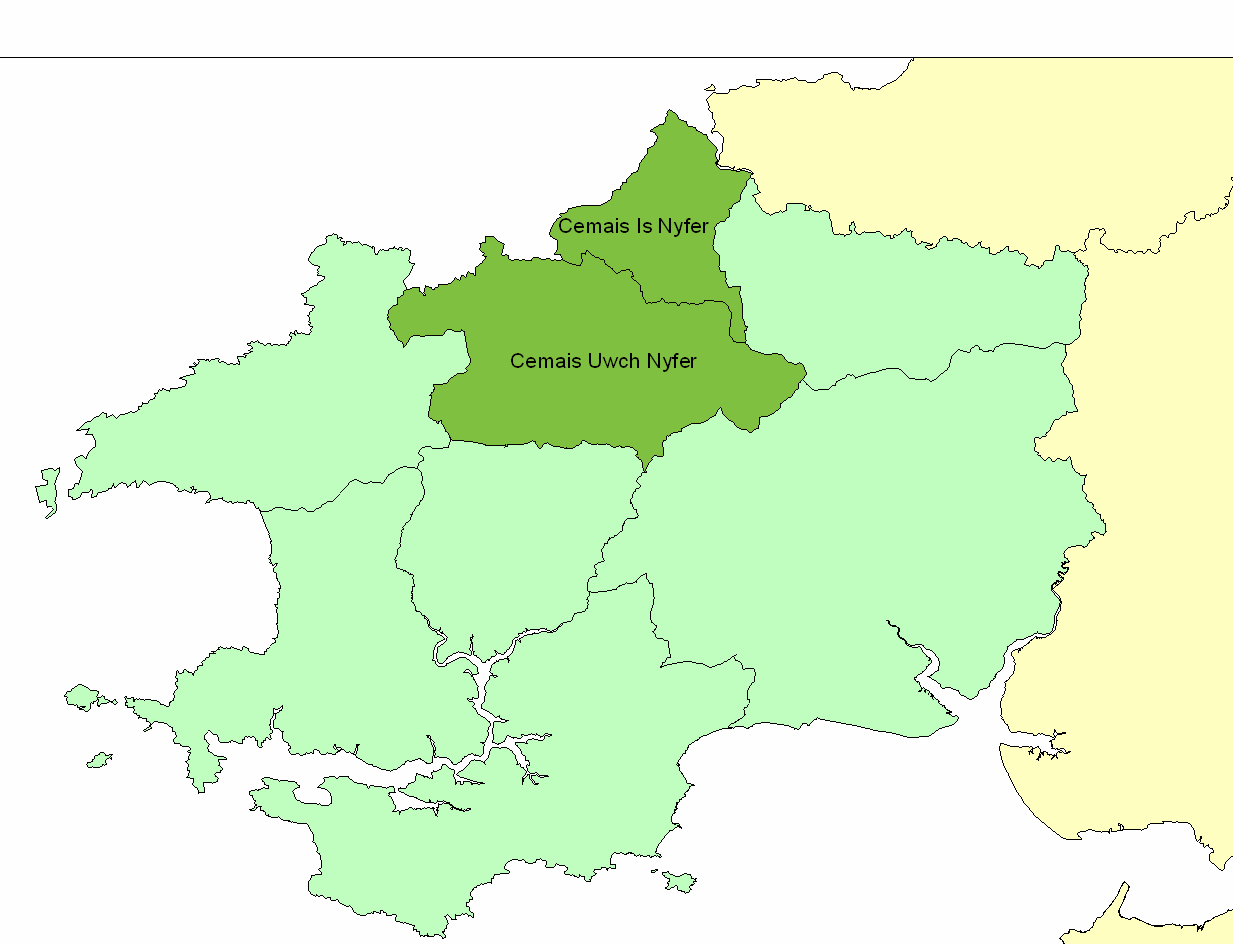
Ancient Dyfed showing the cantref of Cemais and its commotes

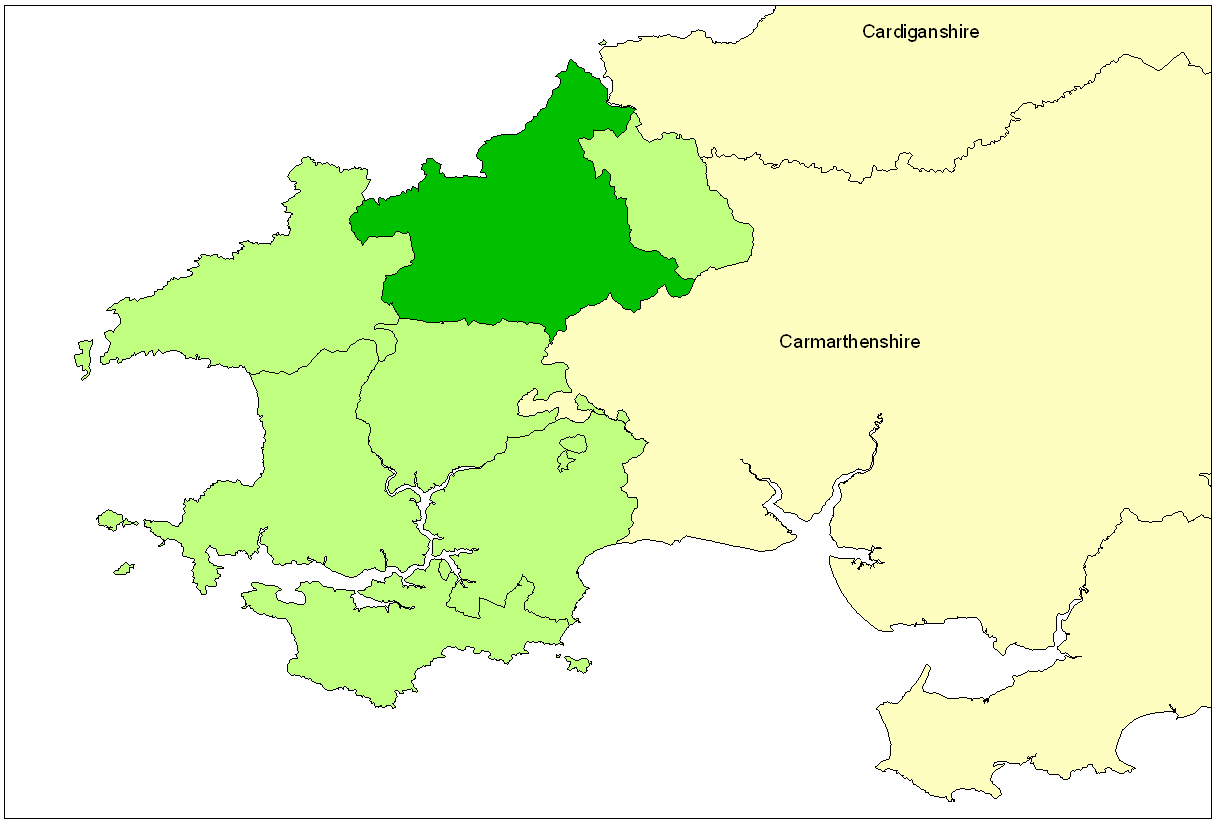
Pembrokeshire showing the hundred of Cemais

Cemais (sometimes spelled Kemes after one of the several variations found in Medieval orthography) was an ancient cantref of the Kingdom of Dyfed, from the 11th century a Norman Marcher Lordship, from the 16th century a Hundred, and is now part of Pembrokeshire, Wales. It occupied the coastal area between the Teifi estuary and Fishguard, and the northern and southern slopes of the Preseli Hills, covering an area of approximately 140 square miles (360 km^{2}). The Afon Nyfer divided it into two commotes: Cemais Is Nyfer to the north and Cemais Uwch Nyfer to the south.

== History ==
=== Deheubarth ===
Although the area is not mentioned by it, an allegorical poem in the Black Book of Carmarthen has been extrapolated by some writers to conclude that the area must have once been under the rule of Cuhelyn the Bard, a descendant of whom was later granted land in the nearby Preseli Hills by charter. In this period, Nevern served as the ecclesiastical centre of the area, and may have been the seat of a bishop.

=== 11th century ===
In the mid 11th century, Dyfed was part of Deheubarth ruled by Rhys ap Tewdwr who had accepted the suzerainty of William the Conqueror following the Norman Conquest of England. When William died in 1087, Rhys took the view that his vassalage was for William's life only; with other magnates, he attacked Worcester during the rebellion of 1088. Rhys was subsequently killed in battle at Brecon. His land—forfeit for rebelling against Norman suzerainty—was seized by various Norman magnates.

In about 1094, Martin de Turribus sailed from Devon to Fishguard. According to local tradition recounted by Richard Fenton, following a skirmish at Morvil, de Turribus was victorious and violent towards the inhabitants he encountered. Except for Dewisland—the lands owned by the Bishop of St. Davids—de Turribus took most of northern coastal Dyfed. The lands seized by him became the Marcher Lordship of Kemes. He chose Nevern for his caput and secured it by establishing a castle there. Kemes remained almost exclusively Welsh-speaking.

=== 12th century ===
Following Henry I's death in 1135, anarchy followed due to conflict between rival claimants. Gruffydd took the opportunity to reconstruct Deheubarth. Raising an army, Gruffydd conquered much of former Deheubarth including Cemais by 1136. Robert fitz Martin was expelled from the lands. His son, William Fitz Martin, received Kemes as a dowry when he married Angharad, a daughter of Rhys ap Gruffydd.

In 1189, King Henry II died, and Rhys went to Oxford to render homage to Henry's successor Richard the Lionheart; he had been accompanied by Prince John (Richard's brother), but Richard actively refused to meet Rhys, which made Rhys furious. In 1191, despite a previous oath not to do so, Rhys seized Cemais from William Fitz-Martin, and gave it to his son, Gruffydd.

Rhys, however, had an older, bastard, son, Maelgwn, who had become a bitter rival of his brother; Welsh inheritance law allowed bastards to inherit, but Rhys preferred the English practice, which did not, and had been grooming Gruffydd as his successor. Maelgwn attacked Cemais, and took it from Gruffydd, eventually imprisoning his own father—Rhys—in Nevern castle; a younger son, Hywel, eventually released him. When war broke out upon Rhys's death in 1197, between Maelgwn and Gruffydd, William fitz Martin re-established his control of Kemes, founding a new caput at Newport; the eventual victor of the war—Maelgwn—did not displace him.

=== 13th century ===
Kemes remained with William's descendants during the 13th century; even though it was captured by Llywelyn Fawr in 1215 and his grandson in 1257, on both occasions the Fitz-Martins successfully recovered it. In 1326, two years after his similarly named father, the reigning Lord Martin (the Fitz having been dropped earlier in the previous century) died childless, and the Lordship was inherited by his sister, Joan, and her husband, James Audley. The Barons Audley arising from their marriage held the Lordship of Kemes until 1497, when the 7th Baron Audley rebelled against King Henry VII, failed, and was thus executed for high treason, with his lands declared forfeit.

=== 16th century Pembrokeshire ===
In 1534, Henry VIII transferred the lands from the crown to John Tuchet, 8th Baron Audley, as an English feudal barony. Henry had already decided upon the course which would see the status of Marcher Lord entirely abolished the following year, by the first of the Laws in Wales Acts. This Act transformed the former Marcher Lordship of Kemes and the surrounding Marcher Lordship of Pembroke (together with Dewisland) into Pembrokeshire. Pembrokeshire was administratively subdivided into Hundreds, with Cemais largely falling into the new Hundred named Cemais, except for the parish of Llantood (which became part of the neighbouring Cilgerran hundred). A small portion of the former Cantref of Gwarthaf was also included in the Hundred of Cemais.

John sold the feudal barony of Cemais two years later, to a local lawyer, William Owen. He was succeeded in 1574 by his son, George Owen, whose antiquarian interests led him to produce a detailed parish-by-parish description of the Lordship in his second book as well as a detailed description of the boundaries of the hundred.

== See also ==
- Cemaes Head
