= Cemais Uwch Nyfer =

Welsh medieval commote

Coordinates: 51.991°N 4.742°W

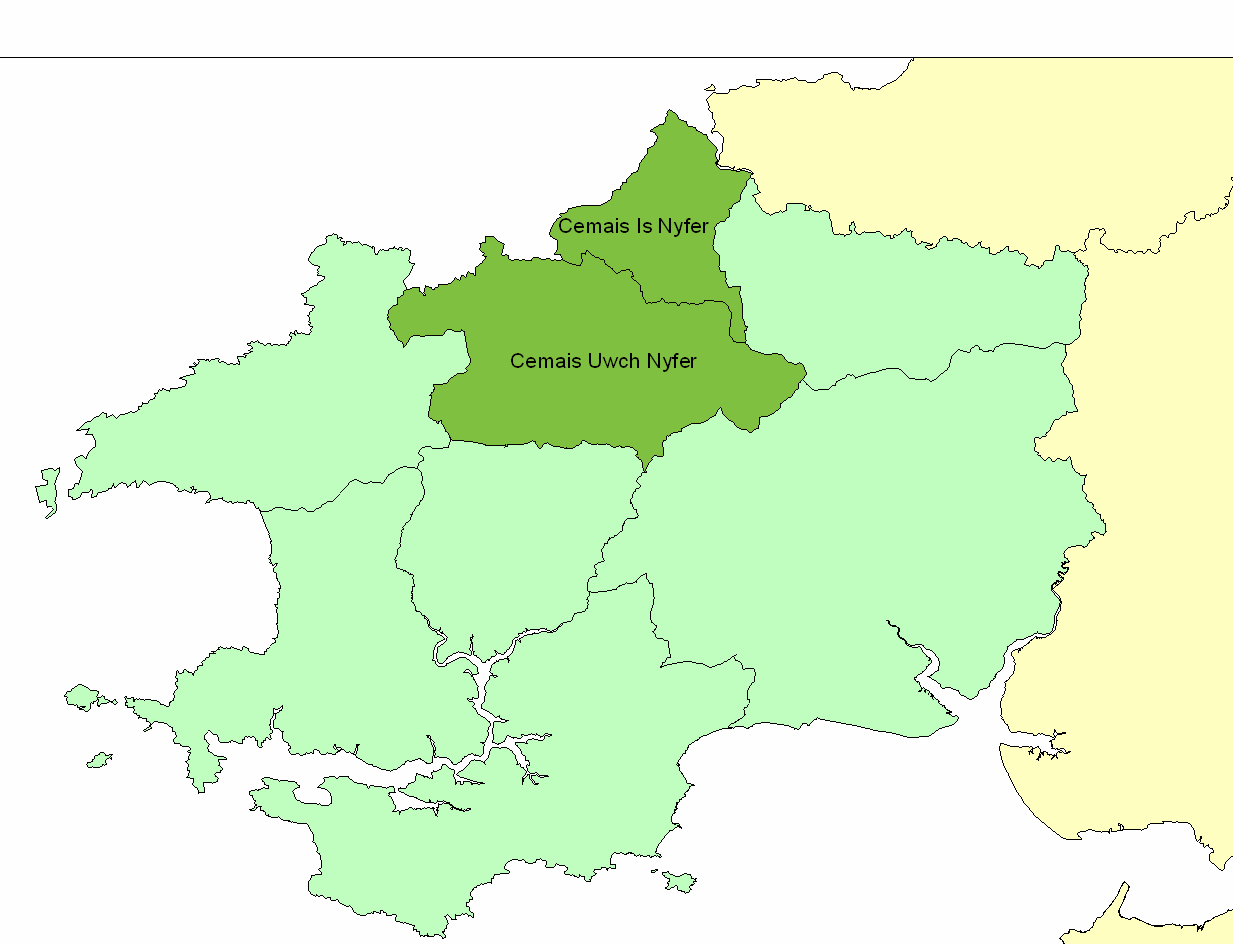
Location of the commote of Cemais Uwch Nyfer

Cemais Uwch Nyfer was a mediaeval Welsh commote in the Dyfed cantref of Cemais, in what is now Pembrokeshire. It consisted of the territory between the Afon Nyfer and Fishguard, and its civil headquarters were at Newport.

The commote was made part of the Norman March in the 12th century, and had at least eight Norman castles (Newport, Little Newcastle, Puncheston, Castlebythe, Henry's Moat, Maenclochog, Llangolman and Llanfyrnach). It ceased to be significant at the time of the Laws in Wales Acts 1535–1542, its functions being taken over by the Hundred of Cemais. It is in the predominantly Welsh-speaking north of Pembrokeshire.

== Parishes ==
It was composed of the following parishes:

Parish	Parish	Parish
Castlebythe	Llanfair Nant-y-gof	Meline (part)
Dinas	Llanfyrnach	Morfil
Eglwyswen	Llangolman	Mynachlog-ddu
Fishguard	Llanllawer	Nevern (part)
Henry's Moat	Llanychaer	Newport
Little Newcastle	Llanychlwydog	Pontfaen
Llandeilo Llwydarth	Maenclochog	Puncheston
