= Brynhenllan =

Village in Pembrokeshire, Wales

Coordinates: 52.017°N 4.900°W

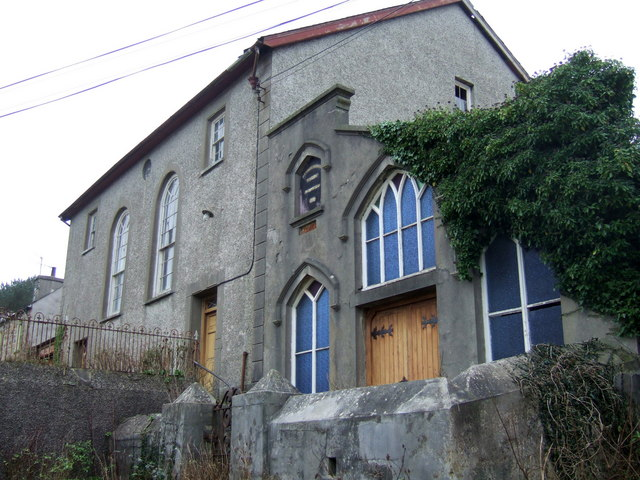
- Brynhenllan Chapel

- Location within Pembrokeshire
- Community: Dinas Cross
- Principal area: Pembrokeshire
- Preserved county: Dyfed
- Country: Wales
- Sovereign state: United Kingdom
- Post town: Newport
- Postcode district: SA42
- Dialling code: 01348
- Police: Dyfed-Powys
- Fire: Mid and West Wales
- Ambulance: Welsh
- UK Parliament: Preseli Pembrokeshire
- Senedd Cymru – Welsh Parliament: Preseli Pembrokeshire

Brynhenllan (also spelled Bryn-henllan or Bryn Henllan) is a settlement in the community of Dinas Cross, located in north Pembrokeshire, Wales, just north of the A487 road between Fishguard and Newport, on the road leading to Pwllgwaelod.

== History ==
Brynhenllan was in the ancient parish of Dinas in the hundred of Cemais before the settlement of Dinas Cross developed along the main A487 trunk road. As its name means "Old church hill", it was probably, according to Samuel Lewis and other sources, the original site of the parish church, superseded by the church of St Brynach at Cwm-yr-Eglwys to the northeast.

The history of the village has been discussed by a number of historians, and an overview, with sources, has been published by Pembrokeshire Historical Society.

== Worship ==
Saint Brynach's Church (Church in Wales) was built in 1860 to 1861 to replace the old Saint Brynach's church in Cwm-yr-Eglwys, which was severely damaged in the great storm of 1859.

Brynhenllan Calvinistic Methodist Chapel, also known as Ramah, was founded in 1769 and rebuilt in 1842. It is a Grade II* listed building and has been converted into a private house.
