= Gwaun =

Gwaun may refer to the following places in Wales:

- Cwm Gwaun, village and community in Pembrokeshire
- Gwaun-Cae-Gurwen, village in Neath Port Talbot
- River Gwaun, river in Pembrokeshire
