= Fishguard Bay =

Bay in Pembrokeshire, Wales

Coordinates: 52°00′50″N 4°56′55″W

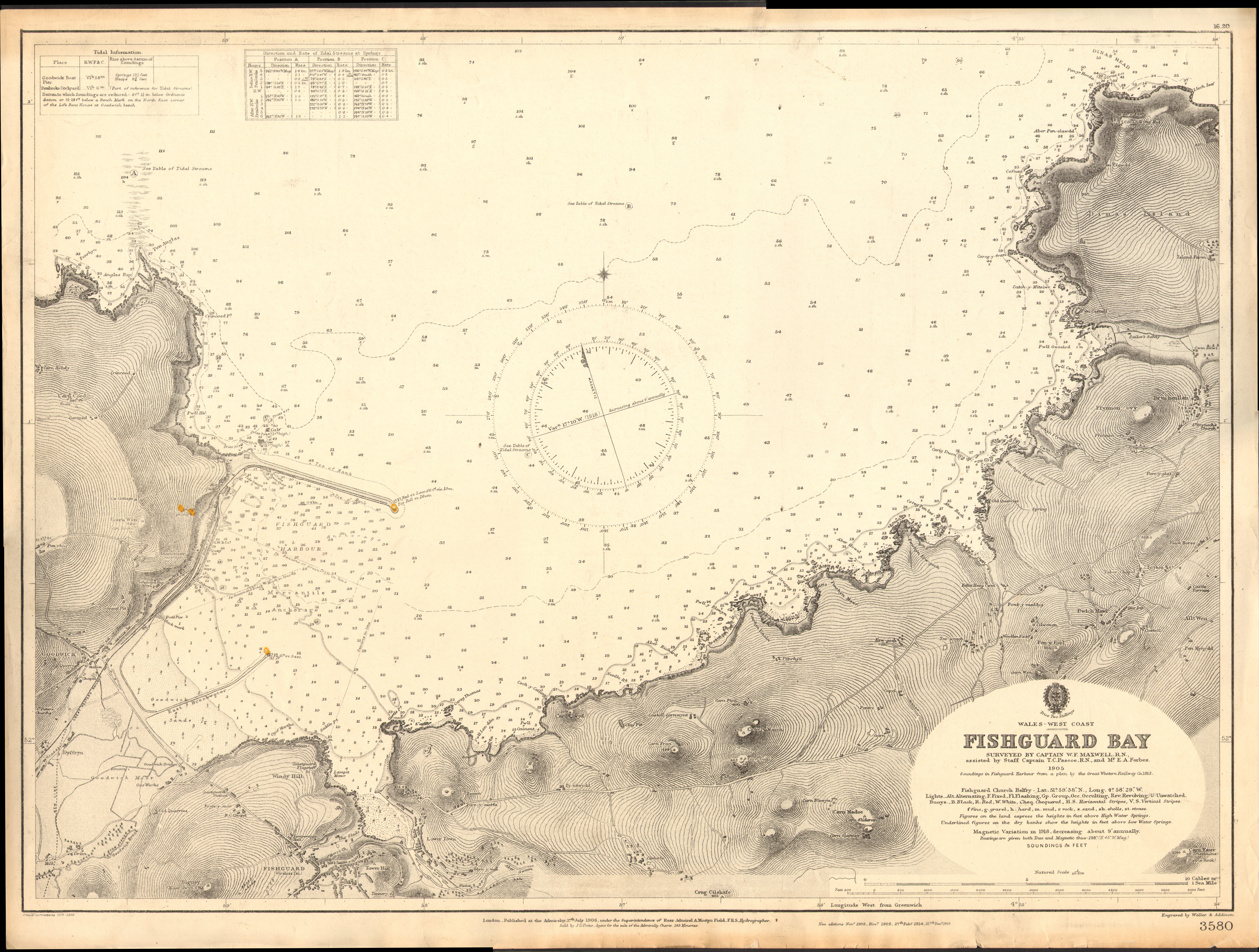
Admiralty Chart of Fishguard Bay, 1909 (Dinas top right, harbour bottom left)

Fishguard Bay (Welsh: Bae Abergwaun) is a bay on the north Pembrokeshire coast, Wales. It opens north into Cardigan Bay and features rugged cliffs, tiny coves and the sheltered Fishguard Harbour and port of Lower Fishguard. Ferries from Fishguard cross to Ireland, and numerous activities are carried out in this holiday area.

== Location ==
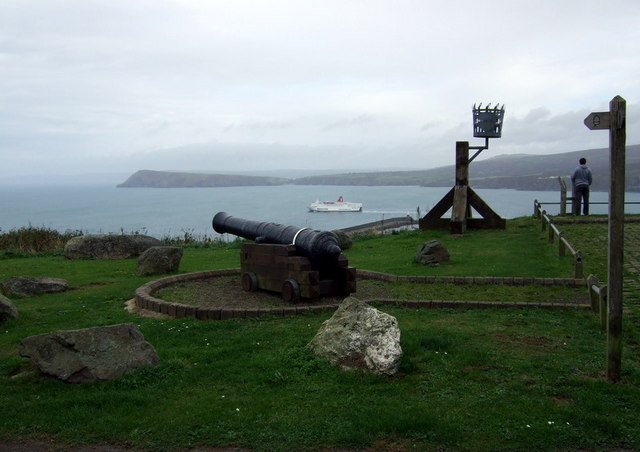
Looking northeast from above Fishguard Harbour towards Dinas Head across the bay

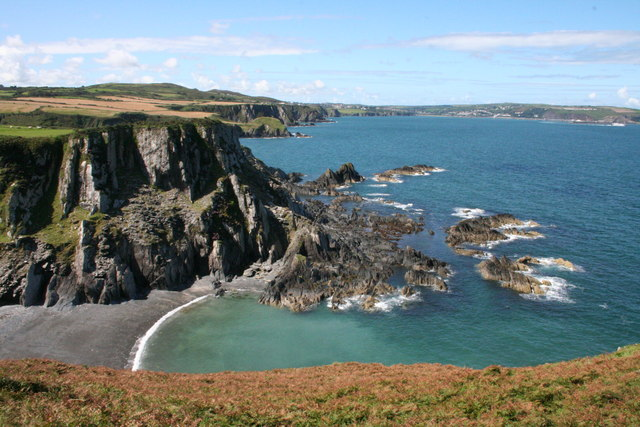
Looking west across the bay from above Pwllgwaelod to Fishguard Harbour in the distance

Much of the bay's coastline is within the Pembrokeshire Coast National Park though the developed areas of Fishguard and Goodwick are excluded. Fronting onto the much larger Cardigan Bay, Fishguard Bay stretches from Dinas Island (actually a peninsula) to Crincoed Point, three miles to the west.

== Geography ==
Several smaller inlets pierce the bay's southern shore, whilst in the southwest it has been developed as Fishguard Harbour. The small sandy bay of Pwllgwaelod is located at its eastern extremity. The Pembrokeshire Coast Path, itself a part of the longer Wales Coast Path runs around the bay, taking a slight detour inland along its western side. The majority of the coastline is cliff and rocky shore.

== Amenities ==
=== Fishguard Harbour ===
The main breakwater is approximately 1,000 yards (910 m) long and provides shelter for the car ferry terminal (with regular services to Rosslare Harbour) and Fishguard Lifeboat Station.

Fishguard Bay Yacht Club, founded in 1947, provides facilities for sailing, rowing, kayaking, paddle-boarding and rowing in the harbour.

Boat trips operate from the harbour along the bay and beyond.

The bay gives its name to a holiday park.
