= New Inn, Pembrokeshire =

Hamlet in Pembrokeshire, Wales

Coordinates: 51.93°N 4.82°W

New Inn: Welsh: Tafarn Newydd
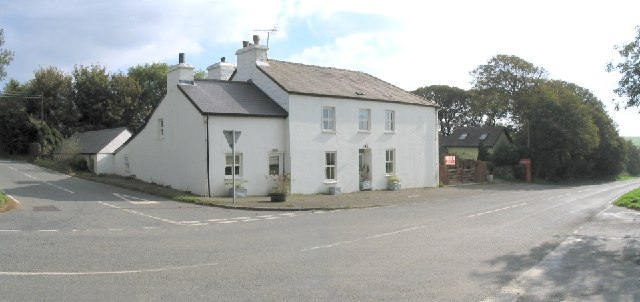
- The former inn building at New Inn

- Location within Pembrokeshire
- OS grid reference: SN061295
- Principal area: Pembrokeshire
- Country: Wales
- Sovereign state: United Kingdom
- Post town: Clynderwen
- Postcode district: SA66
- Police: Dyfed-Powys
- Fire: Mid and West Wales
- Ambulance: Welsh
- UK Parliament: Preseli Pembrokeshire
- Senedd Cymru – Welsh Parliament: Preseli Pembrokeshire

New Inn (Welsh: Tafarn Newydd) is a hamlet on the southern slopes of the Preseli Mountains in Pembrokeshire, Wales. It sits on the crossroads between the B4329 old Cardigan to Haverfordwest turnpike and the B4313 road between Fishguard and Narberth and is the site of a former inn serving travellers on these routes, now a private dwelling. New Inn is in the parish of Morvil and the community of Puncheston, and the nearest village is Rosebush.

The North Pembrokeshire and Fishguard Railway had a halt at New Inn.

Richard Fenton described New Inn in his 1811 Historical Tour through Pembrokeshire –

…New Inn, a public-house of no very imposing appearance, yet proving no small accommodation in the long stage across the mountains from Haverfordwest to Cardigan, and where a slender viaticum for man and horse is absolutely necessary to fit them for the arduous task of winding up the painful ascent of Bwlch Gwynt.
