= Dinas Cross =

Village and community in Pembrokeshire, Wales

Dinas Cross: Welsh: Dinas
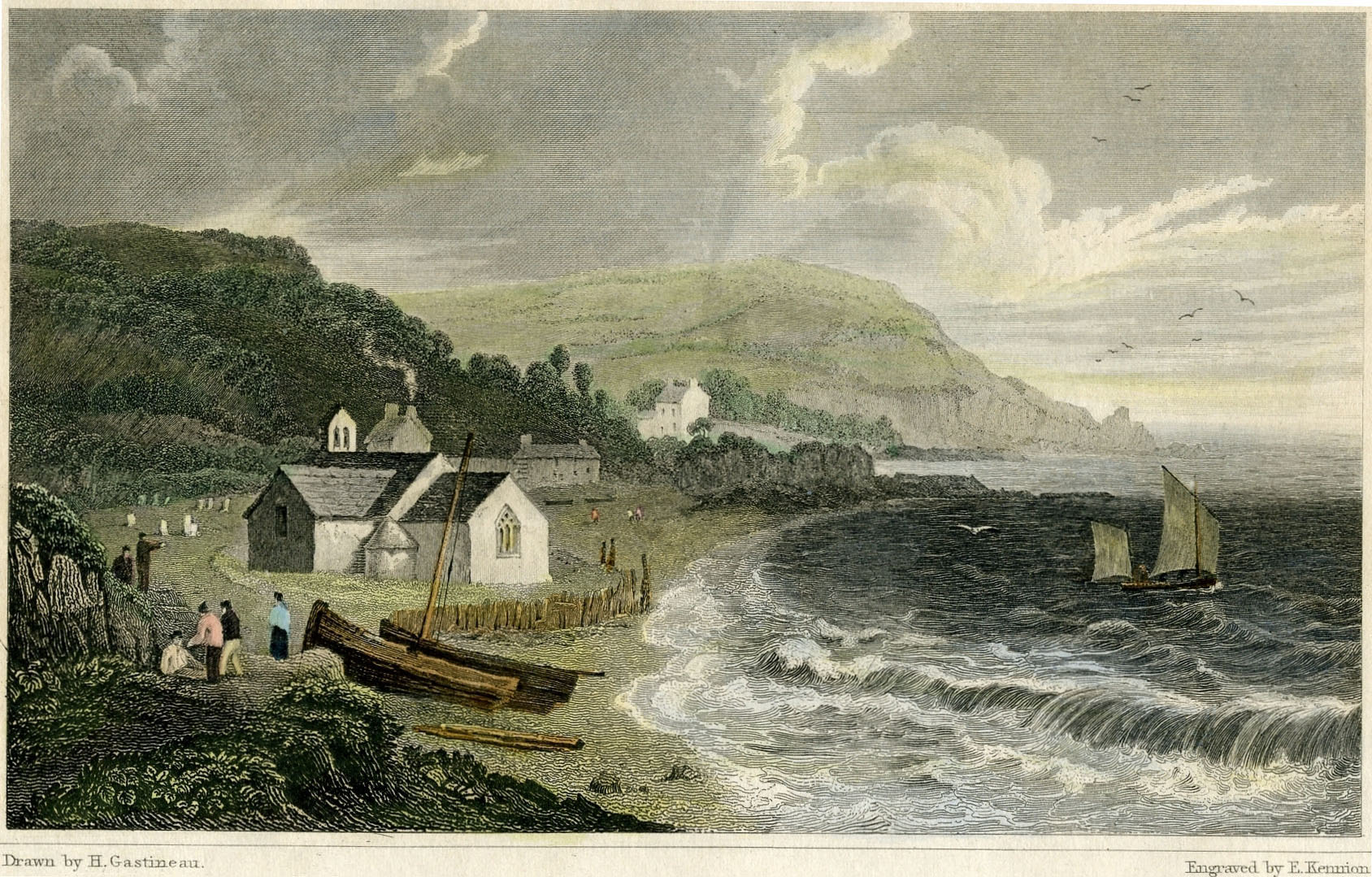
- Dinas parish church at Cwm-yr-Eglwys prior to its destruction c. 1830

- Location within Pembrokeshire
- Population: 815 (2011)
- Community: Dinas Cross
- Principal area: Pembrokeshire
- Preserved county: Dyfed
- Country: Wales
- Sovereign state: United Kingdom
- Post town: Newport
- Postcode district: SA42
- Dialling code: 01348
- Police: Dyfed-Powys
- Fire: Mid and West Wales
- Ambulance: Welsh
- UK Parliament: Preseli Pembrokeshire
- Senedd Cymru – Welsh Parliament: Ceredigion Penfro
- List of places UK Wales Pembrokeshire 52.010878°N 4.909777°W Map of the community

Dinas Cross (Welsh: Dinas) is a village, a community and a former parish in Pembrokeshire, Wales. Located between Fishguard and Newport in the Pembrokeshire Coast National Park, it is a popular holiday destination on the A487 road. The two hamlets, Cwm-yr-Eglwys and Pwllgwaelod, are in the community. The community has an elected community council and until 2022 gave its name to an electoral ward of Pembrokeshire County Council which covered the communities of Dinas Cross, Cwm Gwaun and Puncheston.

== History ==
The parish was in the Hundred of Cemais; as Dynas, it appeared on a 1578 parish map of Pembrokeshire.

In the early 19th century the parish had 741 inhabitants. At this time the walls of the parish church of St Brynach were washed by the sea at spring high tides. The parish extended from Dinas Head on Dinas Island into the Preseli Mountains and included several small settlements to the north and south of the turnpike from Fishguard to Newport, which is now the A487 road.

== Governance ==
Dinas Cross has an elected community council. An electoral ward of the same name exists which includes the communities of Dinas Cross, Cwm Gwaun and Puncheston and had a population of 1,696 in 2011.

Following the recommendations of a boundary review by the Local Government Boundary Commission for Wales, effective from the 2022 local elections, the Dinas Cross county ward was merged with the neighbouring community of Newport to create a new ward of 'Newport and Dinas', electing one county councillor. The communities of Cwm Gwaun and Puncheston formed, together with Scleddau, a new ward of Bro Gwaun.

== Amenities ==
Dinas has four pubs: The Country Club, The Ship Aground, The Freemasons Arms and The Old Sailors. At one time there was also a café, a school, Rhoshelyg garden centre, a garage, a petrol station, a full-time post office, one shop and a local blacksmith. Now the old school is a Community hall (Yr Hen Ysgol), the post office is part-time, and one shop, garage, petrol station and a chip shop remain, as well as the local blacksmith, now 5th generation. There are also a few artists based in Dinas Cross: two of them have studio / gallery spaces that are open to the public – namely Coast and Wild on Feidr Fawr, and The David Light Gallery at Myrtle Hill; both are situated on the road to Pwllgwaelod.

== Worship ==
The church in Dinas was founded by St Brynach, in the 5th or early 6th century.

Dinas has two chapels: Tabor (a Baptist Chapel) and Gideon (an Independent Chapel). Ramah, a disused Methodist Chapel is on the way to Pwllgwaelod beach.

== Places of interest ==
- Cwm-yr-Eglwys – the church of St Brynach the Abbot, the original parish church of Dinas, perhaps dating back to before the Norman Conquest, is situated on the picturesque beach of Cwm-yr-Eglwys. The chancel of the church was washed away in 1850, and the roof and north wall were destroyed during the Royal Charter Storm in 1859. In 1880, the walls were demolished and the church reduced to the present west end wall only, to allow a defensive seawall to be built. A replacement church was built 1860–61 higher up in the village.
- Dinas Island – A small peninsula, a popular walk and an old farm. The Pembrokeshire Coast Path passes by St. Brynach's church and around Dinas Island.
- Hescwm Mill – an old mill now restored lying 200m inland of Hescwm cove. It is a Grade II* listed building.
- Brynhenllan Chapel, a Grade II* listed building.
- Pencnwc Farm was the birthplace of Sgt. William Batine James who, having emigrated to America in 1871 and joined the US Army in 1872, was the only Welshman to die at the Battle of the Little Bighorn in 1876. He was in Company E of the 7th Cavalry.
