= Tufton, Pembrokeshire =

Village in Pembrokeshire, Wales

Coordinates: 51.917°N 4.851°W

Tufton
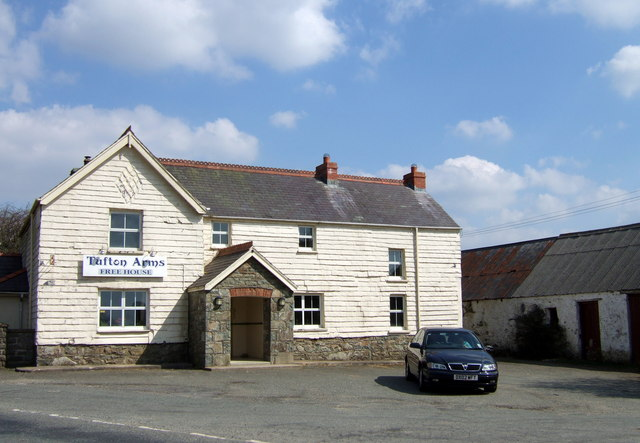
- Tufton Arms pub in 2007

- Location within Pembrokeshire
- OS grid reference: SN040282
- Community: Puncheston
- Principal area: Pembrokeshire
- Country: Wales
- Sovereign state: United Kingdom
- Post town: Clarbeston Road
- Postcode district: SA63
- Dialling code: 01348
- Police: Dyfed-Powys
- Fire: Mid and West Wales
- Ambulance: Welsh
- UK Parliament: Preseli Pembrokeshire
- Senedd Cymru – Welsh Parliament: Preseli Pembrokeshire

Tufton is a crossroads hamlet in the parish of Henry's Moat in Pembrokeshire, Wales, on the B4329, a road between Eglwyswrw and Haverfordwest across the Preseli Hills. It is in the community of Puncheston.

== Name ==
The origin of the place name Tufton is not clear. There is a tenuous link with the Tufton Arms in the 1792 marriage of Joseph Foster Barham of Trecwn (who inherited Pembrokeshire property from his mother, Dorothea Vaughan, and whose son Charles Henry was a Pembroke JP) to Lady Caroline Tufton, daughter of Sackville Tufton, 8th Earl of Thanet.

== Inn ==
The Tufton Arms inn stands at the crossroads. The pub holds a beer festival on the first Friday in July. According to a 19th-century map, this was the only inn in the parish. Coursing meetings were hosted by the pub in the mid-1800s and, in a fox hunting report, it was described as having "good beer". In 1863, the landlady, Mrs Thomas, died "at an advanced age". A Mr Thomas was landlord in 1868, when he was called as a witness in Haverfordwest in a case of sheep-stealing. The thief, Caleb Morris, was sentenced to five years, and later Thomas, after a collection, was presented with a watch in recompense for his sheep. It was the annual custom of the Reverend C. H. Barham to entertain his tenants and friends at Thomas's inn, which in 1873 was able to provide a roast dinner and ale for "upwards of 90 persons".

== Chapel ==
Siloh Chapel is a Calvinistic Methodist chapel in the Union of Welsh Independent churches. It was founded in 1842, registered to solemnise marriages in 1844, and restored in 1900. Short biographical details of the early ministers and members of the congregation appeared in a history published in 1871.

== Transport ==
Tufton is on the B4329, a centuries-old route between Cardigan and Haverfordwest and is on a bus route. National Cycle Route 47 crosses the B4329 at Tufton.

== Blaenwern ==
The hymn tune Blaenwern is named after a farm near Tufton where the composer, William Penfro Rowlands, was either sent as a boy or sent his son, to recuperate from an illness in the early 20th century.

== Historic structures ==
"Tufton Castle" is the name given by Coflein to an enclosure just north of the hamlet, which may have been an ancient Iron Age settlement. Coflein records a mediaeval strip field system, identified from aerial reconnaissance in 2007 and a post-mediaeval rubble stone house worthy of note. An 1888 map shows a smithy at the crossroads.

Richard Fenton, in the early 19th century, described a small roadside house as Poll-tax Inn. Fenton attributes the name to a place where poll tax was collected, but other names have been used, such as Paltockes Inne in 1200, Paltocksin, Battog's Inn or Baltox Inn. It appears on an old parish map south of Tufton on the B4329, which has now bypassed the place (the old road forded a stream, shown on modern maps as Portrux Ford), which is in the parish of Castlebythe.
