= Castlebythe =

Village and parish in Pembrokeshire, Wales

Coordinates: 51.92°N 4.88°W

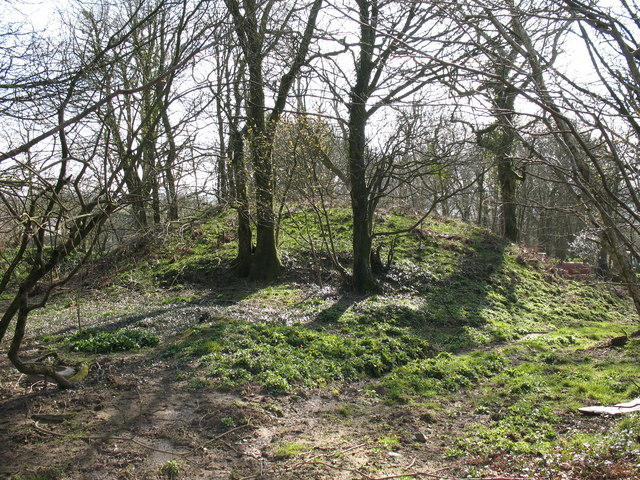
- The motte at Castlebythe

- Location within Pembrokeshire
- OS grid reference: SN021291
- Community: Puncheston
- Principal area: Pembrokeshire
- Country: Wales
- Sovereign state: United Kingdom
- Police: Dyfed-Powys
- Fire: Mid and West Wales
- Ambulance: Welsh

Castlebythe (Welsh: Cas-fuwch) is a village and parish in Pembrokeshire, Wales, on the southern slopes of the Preseli Hills, 10 km south-east of Fishguard. The northern part of the parish is in the Pembrokeshire Coast National Park. Together with the parishes of Henry's Moat, Little Newcastle, Morvil and Puncheston, it constitutes the community of Puncheston.

== Name ==
The Welsh placename (shortened from Castell Fuwch) means "Cow castle", and is perhaps a mocking name for an abandoned fortification, inhabited only by cows. The English placename form is a corruption of the Welsh.

== History ==
There is a prominent early-Norman motte close to the village. There are a few English placenames in the southern part of the parish, but there is no evidence to suggest large-scale English colonisation in the medieval period, and the parish has always been essentially Welsh-speaking.

== Church ==
The church of St Michael was rebuilt in 1875 to the designs of Edwin Dolby. It has since been largely demolished.

The parish had an area of 1047 ha. Its census populations were: 174 (1801): 266 (1851): 155 (1901): 102 (1951): 80 (1981).

The percentage of Welsh language speakers was 100 (1891): 98 (1931): 75 (1971).
