= Llandeilo Llwydarth =

Parish in Pembrokeshire, Wales

Coordinates: 51.91°N 4.76°W

- Location within Pembrokeshire
- OS grid reference: SN101271
- Principal area: Pembrokeshire
- Country: Wales
- Sovereign state: United Kingdom
- Police: Dyfed-Powys
- Fire: Mid and West Wales
- Ambulance: Welsh

Llandeilo Llwydarth (Welsh pronunciation) or Llandilo is an ancient area and parish in the Preseli Hills between Llangolman and Maenclochog in the community of Maenclochog, Pembrokeshire, Wales.

== History ==
The area is rich in prehistoric and early Christian remains, and evidence of more recent activity such as quarrying and defence. In the south of the parish is Temple Druid, a Grade II and Grade II* complex of listed buildings. Llandilo is listed as an historic place name by the Royal Commission RCAHMW.

In 1450 the Bishop of ST Davids John de la Bere agreed to renounce his rights to lands held by Henry Perrot keeper of the Forest of Llwydarth.

The forest of Llwydarth covered some 300 acres in the fourteenth century but by the late sixteenth century it had all but disappeared.

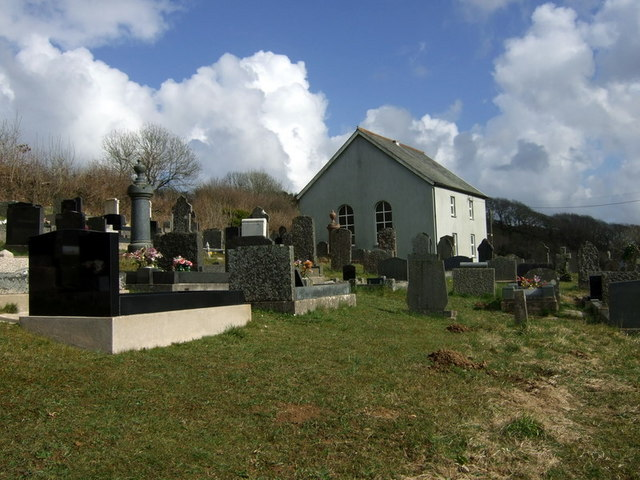
Independent Chapel

Llandilo has a Welsh Independent chapel, built in 1714, subsequently restored several times, and in use in 2020.

Slate of roofing quality was quarried in the 19th century.

== Parish ==
The parish of Llandilo was in the ancient hundred of Cemais. Early in the 19th century the population was 117, and the parish was partly enclosed and part mountainous. Its northern end includes the highest peak in the Preselis, Foel Cwmcerwyn. The parish is combined with Llangolman under the Diocese of St Davids.

The parish church is dedicated to Saint Teilo and the church and parish is associated with holy wells, pre-Christian enclosures and early Christian stones and inscriptions. Extracts from the Coflein online record for the church read:

The site is thought to have early medieval origins, and to be the site of the early medieval ‘bishop house’, Llandeilo Llwydarth, mentioned as one of the seven bishop houses of Dyfed in a 9th century text of the Welsh laws ... St Teilo’s well, some 150m north-east of the church, is notable for its reputation for healing properties, the water having been drunk from part of a human skull ... The church site was abandoned sometime after 1833 and the building fell into ruins.

The skull is kept in the south chapel of Llandaff Cathedral in Cardiff.

== Governance ==
In 1973, the parish Llandilo became part of Haverfordwest Registration District and the following year it became a community with the name of Llandeilo Llwydarth, then in Dyfed, where it remained until 1996, when Pembrokeshire was reinstated as a county of Wales, at which time Llandeilo Llwydarth ceased to be a community.
