= Brynach =

6th-century Welsh saint

Saint Brynach
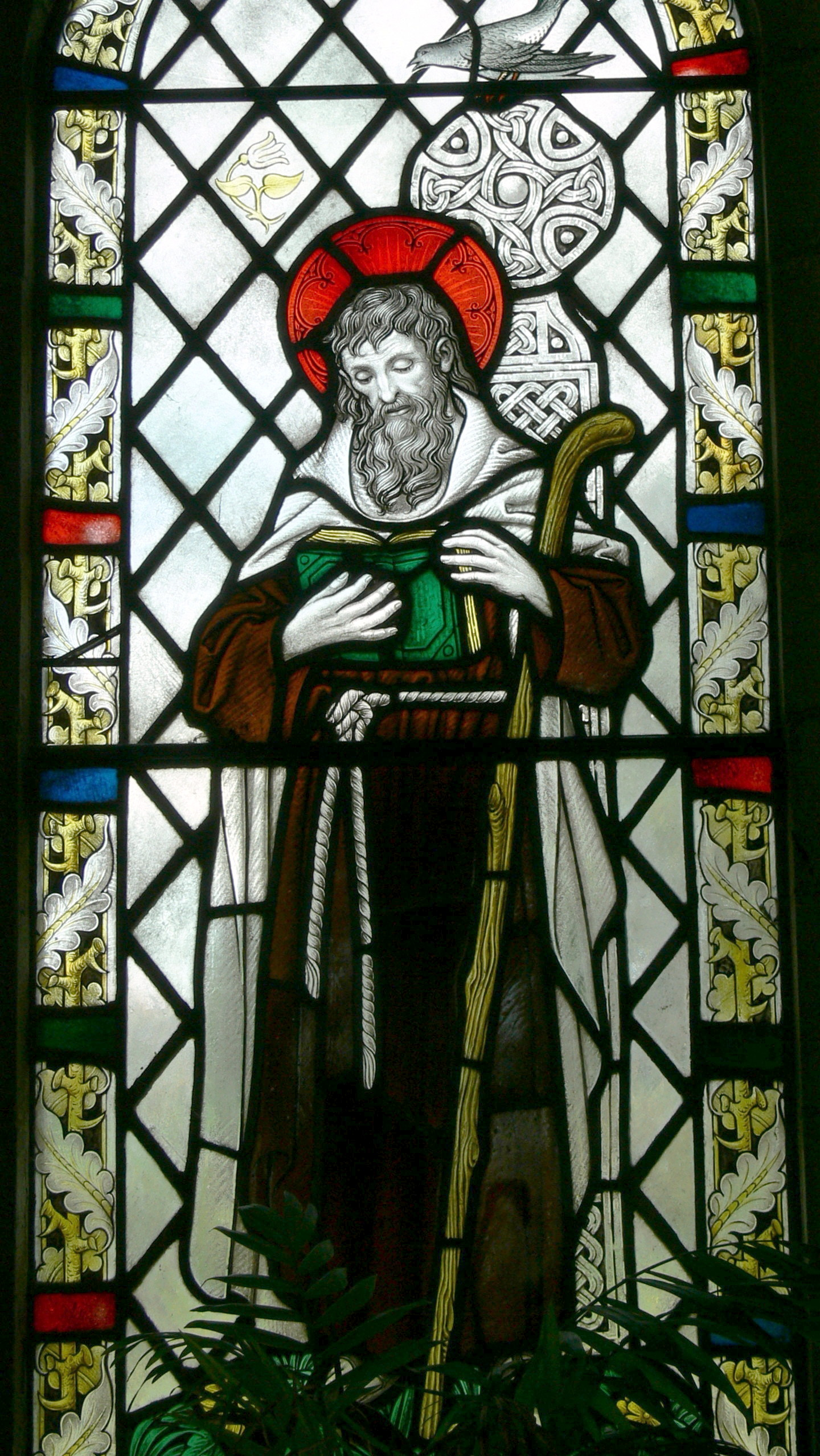
- Our Lady and Saint Non's chapel (St Davids, Wales). Stained glass window (1934) showing Saint Brynach.

Abbot
- Died: 6th century Nevern, Pembrokeshire
- Venerated in: Eastern Orthodox Church; Roman Catholic Church; Anglican Communion
- Major shrine: Nevern, Pembrokeshire
- Feast: 7 April
- Attributes: Monk or abbot with cuckoo and/or the Nevern Cross
- Patronage: Spring

Saint Brynach was a 6th-century Welsh saint. He is traditionally associated with Pembrokeshire, where several churches are dedicated to him.

== Life ==
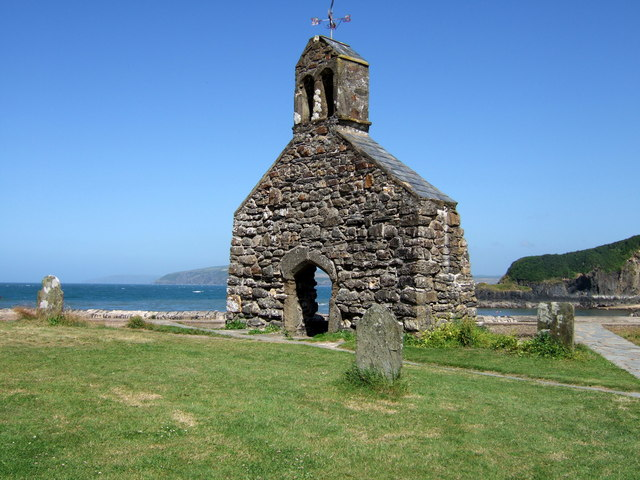
The Church of St Brynach's ruins, Cwm-yr-Eglwys

A 12th-century account of Brynach's life states that sometime in the early 6th century, Brynach travelled (from where is unstated) to Rome and Brittany, and then on to Milford Haven.

He erected various oratories near the rivers Cleddau, Gwaun, and Caman and at the foot of Mynydd Carningli (translated as 'Mountain of the Angels'), which was his most famous foundation. This monastery founded by Brynach was at present-day Nevern (in Welsh, Nanhyfer). The land was given to him by the local lord, Clether, who retired to Cornwall. Brynach was harassed by King Maelgwn of Gwynedd for a while, until he wrought miracles and the two came to terms. Saint Brynach died on 7 April, on which day his feast is celebrated. His church, beside the River Nevern, is his lasting memorial. The Norman Church of St Brynach is on the site of St Brynach's 6th century "clas", an important ecclesiastical centre.

The "Life of St Brynach" portrays him as something of a wild fellow in his youth but very virtuous after his conversion. The descriptions of his adventures (including amorous and ghostly encounters) display a degree of humour unusual in the writers of saintly lives.

== Problems of identification ==
Welsh tradition remembers him as Brynach Wyddel (the Irishman). Brynach may be a form of the Irish name, Bernach. This possibly etymology has led to speculation that Saint Brynach came from Ireland: Iolo Morganwg, followed by Baring-Gould, supposed that he is the same as the chieftain 'Fernach' who came to Wales from Ireland with the young Brychan of Brycheiniog. However, Egerton Phillimore rejects this identification A 'Brennach Wyddel o'r Gogledd' or Brennach the Irishman of the North [of Britain] appears in the Welsh Triads: Rachel Bromwich does not believe Saint Brynach is meant.

== Dedications ==
Dedications of churches to Brynach in Pembrokeshire include Nevern, Dinas Cross, Llanfyrnach, Henry's Moat and Pontfaen. In Carmarthenshire there are Llanboidy and a chapel in Llanddarog, and there are scattered dedications in Glamorgan, Brecknockshire and Monmouthshire. The distribution of these is similar to that of Ogham stones in south Wales, and defines a distinct Irish-influenced province that existed in the Age of the Saints.
