= Pontfaen =

Village and parish in Pembrokeshire, Wales

Coordinates: 51.96°N 04.88°W

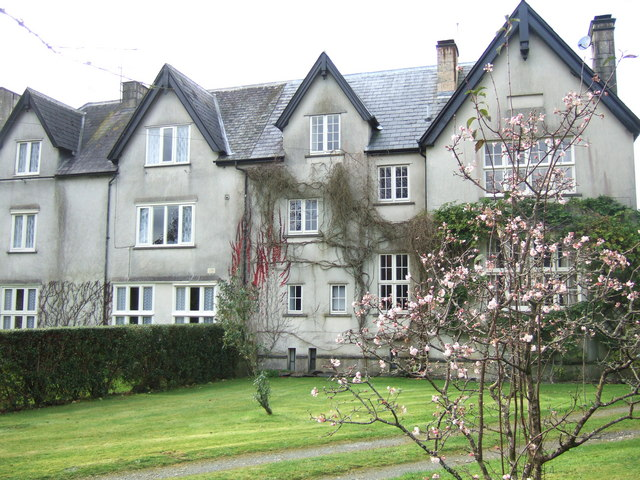
- Pontfaen House

- Location within Pembrokeshire
- OS grid reference: SN0234
- Community: Cwm Gwaun
- Principal area: Pembrokeshire
- Country: Wales
- Sovereign state: United Kingdom
- Post town: Fishguard
- Postcode district: SA65
- Police: Dyfed-Powys
- Fire: Mid and West Wales
- Ambulance: Welsh
- UK Parliament: Preseli Pembrokeshire
- Senedd Cymru – Welsh Parliament: Preseli Pembrokeshire

Pontfaen (English: Bridge on the River Gwaun) is a small rural village and parish in the community of Cwm Gwaun, north Pembrokeshire, Wales. It is 3 miles (4.8 km) southeast of the port of Fishguard.

== History ==
Pontfaen was in the ancient hundred of Cemais. Early in the 19th century the population was 61, and the parish had fertile soil on unworked slate, with grouse shooting. For many years it was the seat of the Laugharne family.

Glandwr Baptist chapel in the village was built in 1894. The Reverend Carl D Williams, a well-known preacher in Wales, had been the minister for 28 years (in all, a minister for 50 years) until his retirement in 2010.

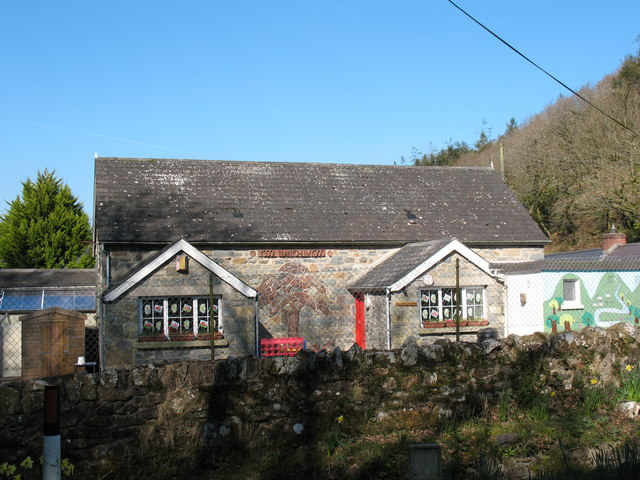
Cwm Gwaun Primary School

The locals continue to follow the tradition of the pre-1752 Julian calendar and celebrate New Year (Welsh: Hen Galan) on 13 January. Children walk from house to house, and sing traditional Welsh language songs. In return, householders provide gifts, or calennig, of sweets and money. In 2012, it was reported that most children from the local primary school would be absent that day to take part in the celebrations.

== Features ==
A bridge crosses the River Gwaun in the north of the parish, giving the place its name. The village pub is the Grade II-listed Dyffryn Arms, known locally as Bessie's and run by Bessie Davies's family since 1845. The pub was originally called Llwyn Celyn (Holly Bush). In 2011 it featured in S4C's Straeon Tafarn series. In 2015 it featured in the Good Beer Guide for a 40th successive year. In February 2019 it suffered a significant fire, but reopened in June.

Pontfaen has a post office.

The Gwaun Valley contains a brewery at the Kilkiffeth Farm. A small hydroelectric power scheme is running at Pontfaen, whose output is sufficient to power some 70 homes.

Pontfaen House (Plas Pontfaen and Pontfaen Farmhouse) is a Grade II listed building.

== Parish ==
This small parish is in the Diocese of St Davids, absorbed with two other parishes into the larger Parish of Fishguard of the Church in Wales. Pontfaen (as Pontvaine) appears on a 1578 parish map of Pembrokeshire. It is rural, with no other settlements.

The parish church of St Brynach is of mediaeval origin, said to have been rebuilt in the 17th century, but was a ruin by 1859. It was subsequently restored over the turn of the 19th/20th century by architects George Morgan & Sons of Carmarthen under the patronage of Percy Arden. The churchyard is circular with some early mediaeval inscribed stones.
