= B4329 road =

Road in Wales

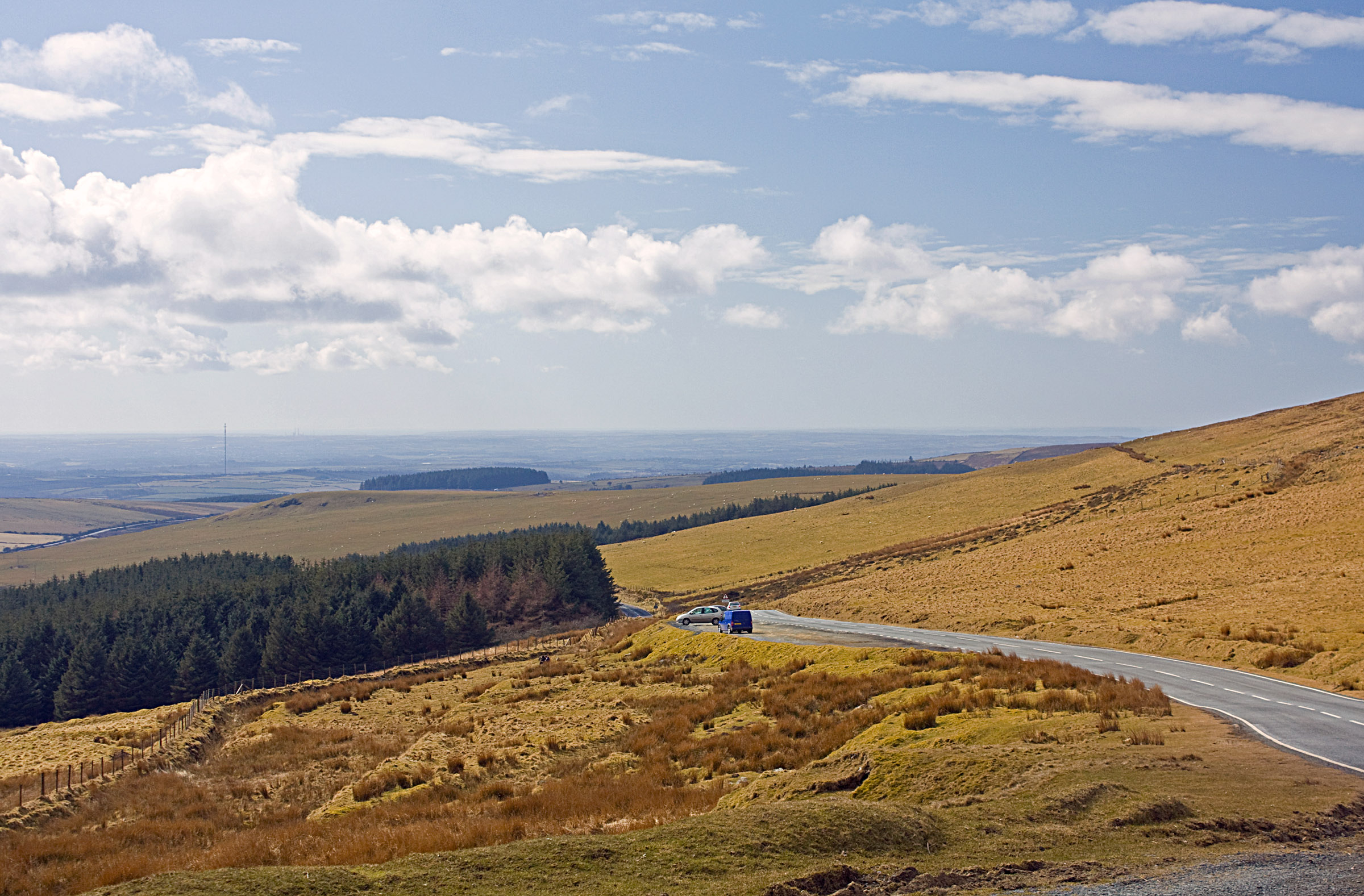
View south from Bwlch-Gwynt (March 2010)

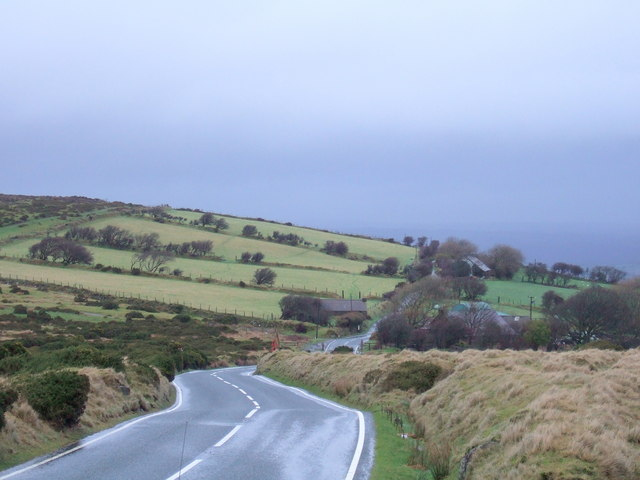
Looking north from the moorland to Tafarn-y-Bwlch

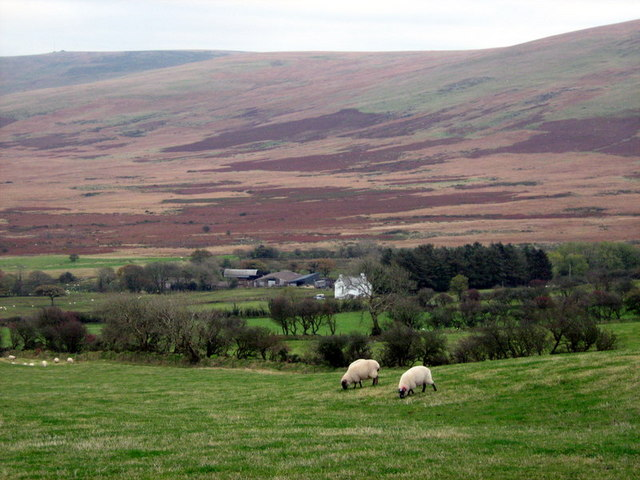
View east from near Brynberian

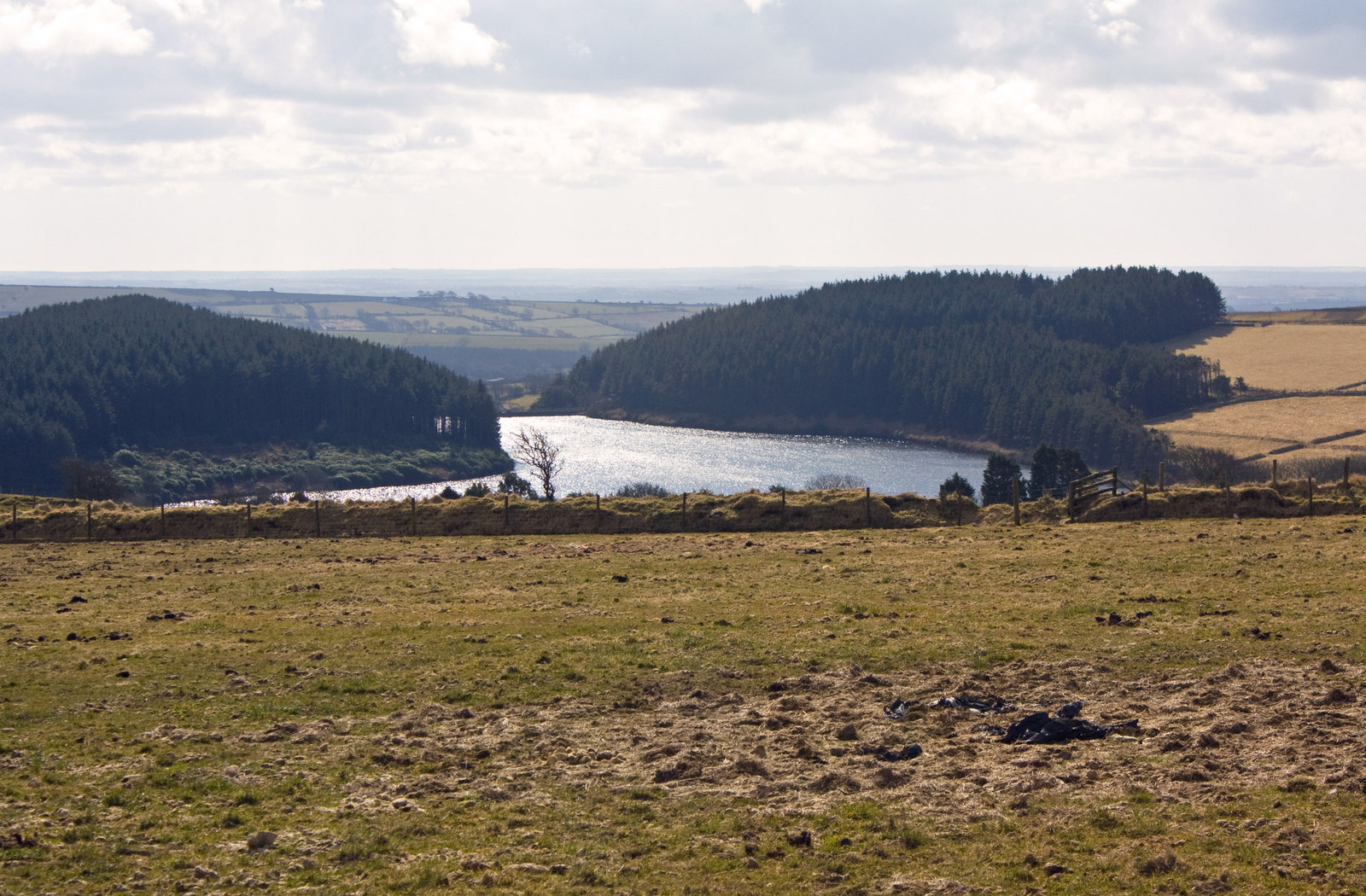
Rosebush Reservoir

The B4329 is a scenic route and a former turnpike in Pembrokeshire, West Wales. It links Eglwyswrw in the north of the county to Haverfordwest, the county town in the south, in an approximately southwesterly direction, crossing the Preseli Mountains. At both its northern and southern ends, it joins the A487 trunk road.

Before the 20th century, the road across the mountains was the main route linking Cardigan and Haverfordwest, a distance of 27 miles, and featured a number of inns (at least eight) to sustain travellers. The part now designated B4329 is 19 miles (31 km) long and varies in elevation from 20–404 metres (66–1,325 ft) above sea level. Much of the route is through farmland with scattered settlements, while the central section is through high moorland grazing with extensive views.

== History ==
The road was the main link between Cardigan and Haverfordwest in mediaeval times; the future Henry VII of England used it to march from Haverfordwest to Cardigan in early August 1485 on his way to the Battle of Bosworth Field. In the following century, the Highways Act 1555 placed the burden of maintenance of roads on the parishes through which they ran. In the 18th century, on the grounds that the road was badly in need of repair, it was turnpiked with a toll of six pence per cart by the 1790 Haverfordwest Roads Bill, though not without protests from parishes from Stephen's Ford, near Haverfordwest, to Cornel Fach (a.k.a. "Morris the Bailiffs") in Castlebythe parish, on account of the hardship tolls would bring to local people. In Samuel Lewis's 1833 A Topographical Dictionary of Wales it is described as the "great road" from Cardigan to Haverfordwest. In 1895, H. Thornhill-Timmins termed it "the main road... from Haverfordwest to Cardigan".

While the A487 (Cardigan to Fishguard) and the A40 (Fishguard to Haverfordwest) sections were later upgraded to trunk routes, the direct route was not, and was designated in the early 20th century road classification scheme as the B4329. From the 1920s to 1935, the B4329 was a multiplex with the A487 and an unclassified road from Boncath but reverted to the original start point in Eglwyswrw. The unclassified road became the B4332. Before that, when most journeys were made on foot, horseback or horse-drawn vehicle, travellers were provided for by inns along the route, such as those at Crosswell, Tufton, New Inn and Crundale.

== Extensive views ==
From the high moorland, there are extensive views across much of Pembrokeshire with the Bristol Channel, St George's Channel and the Irish Sea beyond. On clear days there are views as far as the Gower Peninsula in the southeast, much of mid-Wales to the north as far as Snowdonia and the Llŷn Peninsula as well as across much of the Preseli range. It is also possible, atmospheric conditions permitting, to see the tops of mountains in Ireland over 100 miles (160 km) away. The Preselis are noted for their many prehistoric sites, some of which are close to the B4329.

Because of the steep inclines in the mountains, few heavy goods vehicles use the route, which is popular with tourists and bikers. In winter, the highest parts of the road can occasionally be closed when ice or snow make driving conditions dangerous.

== Route ==
=== Northern section ===
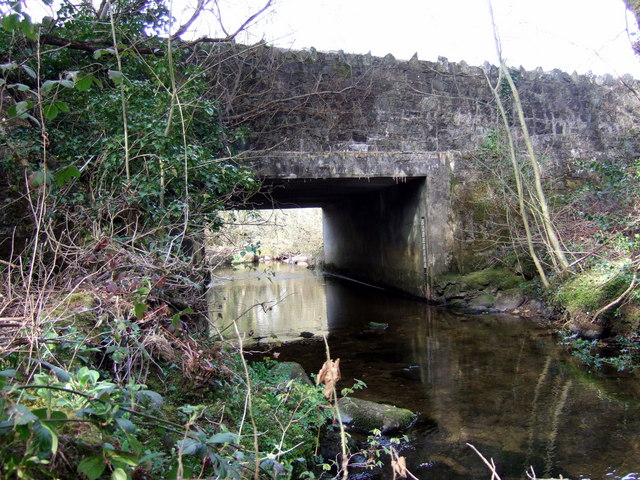
Stone beam bridge at Brynberian

From its northern end, branching from the A487 1/2 mile (0.80 km) southwest of Eglwyswrw, the road drops down to cross the River Nevern by a single-lane stone bridge (Pont Gynon) just north of the hamlet of Crosswell, where a former inn, now Crosswell House, still stands. The road enters the Pembrokeshire Coast National Park, crossing another narrow bridge, Pont Saeson, then climbs steadily through farmland, passing a Grade II-listed 19th century circular stone structure for impounding livestock that had strayed from the mountains. Crossing a 400-year-old bridge (mentioned as Pont llin birian in c.1600) crossing Afon Brynberian, the road passes close by the hamlet of Brynberian.

=== Mountain section ===
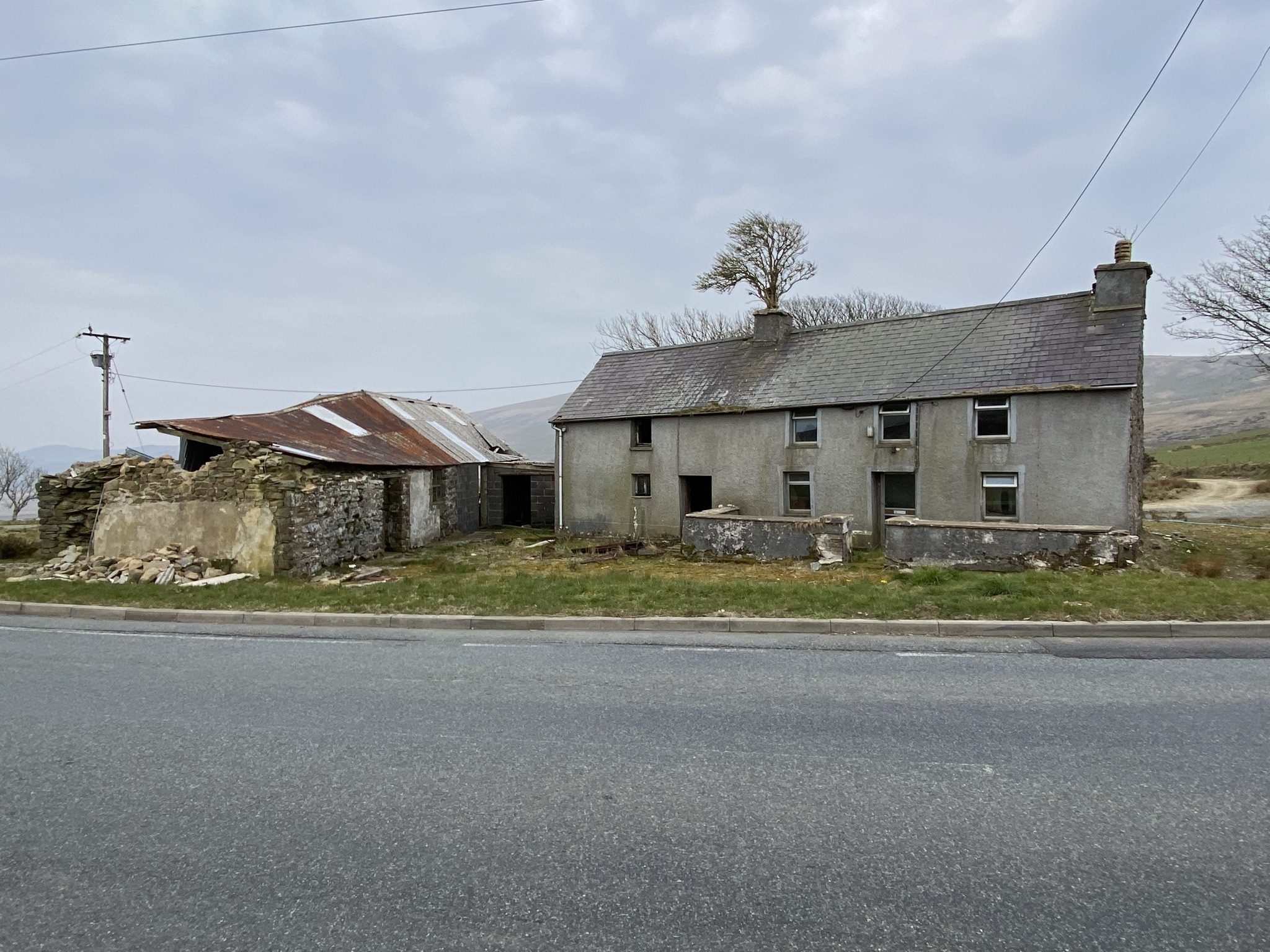
The now-derelict Tafarn y Bwlch

From Brynberian, the gradient increases until the road reaches 284 metres (932 ft) at Tafarn-y-Bwlch (approximate English: Tavern at the Pass), an inn which existed at least as early as 1729, and still sustaining travellers as late as 1895, when it was described as a "lowly inn", but providing food. The building was recorded by the Royal Commission in 2003 and was still standing, but derelict, in 2024. On an 1888 map, the inn was called Salutation Inn. Close by is Waun Mawn, whose prehistoric stones have been linked to those at Stonehenge. Immediately after the inn, the road crosses a cattle grid marking a boundary between enclosed agricultural land and unenclosed moorland and continues to climb, reaching 404 metres (1,325 ft) between Cerrig Lladron and Mynydd-du Commin. At the summit the B4329 meets the western end of the elevated track that runs from Mynachlog-ddu along the top of the range and is known as Flemings' Way or alternatively the Golden Road.

After the summit, Bwlch-gwynt (translation: windy gap), the road drops steeply to another cattle grid and the intersection with the B4313 at New Inn which, according to Richard Fenton in the 19th century, sustained northbound travellers before "the arduous task of winding up the painful ascent of Bwlch Gwynt".

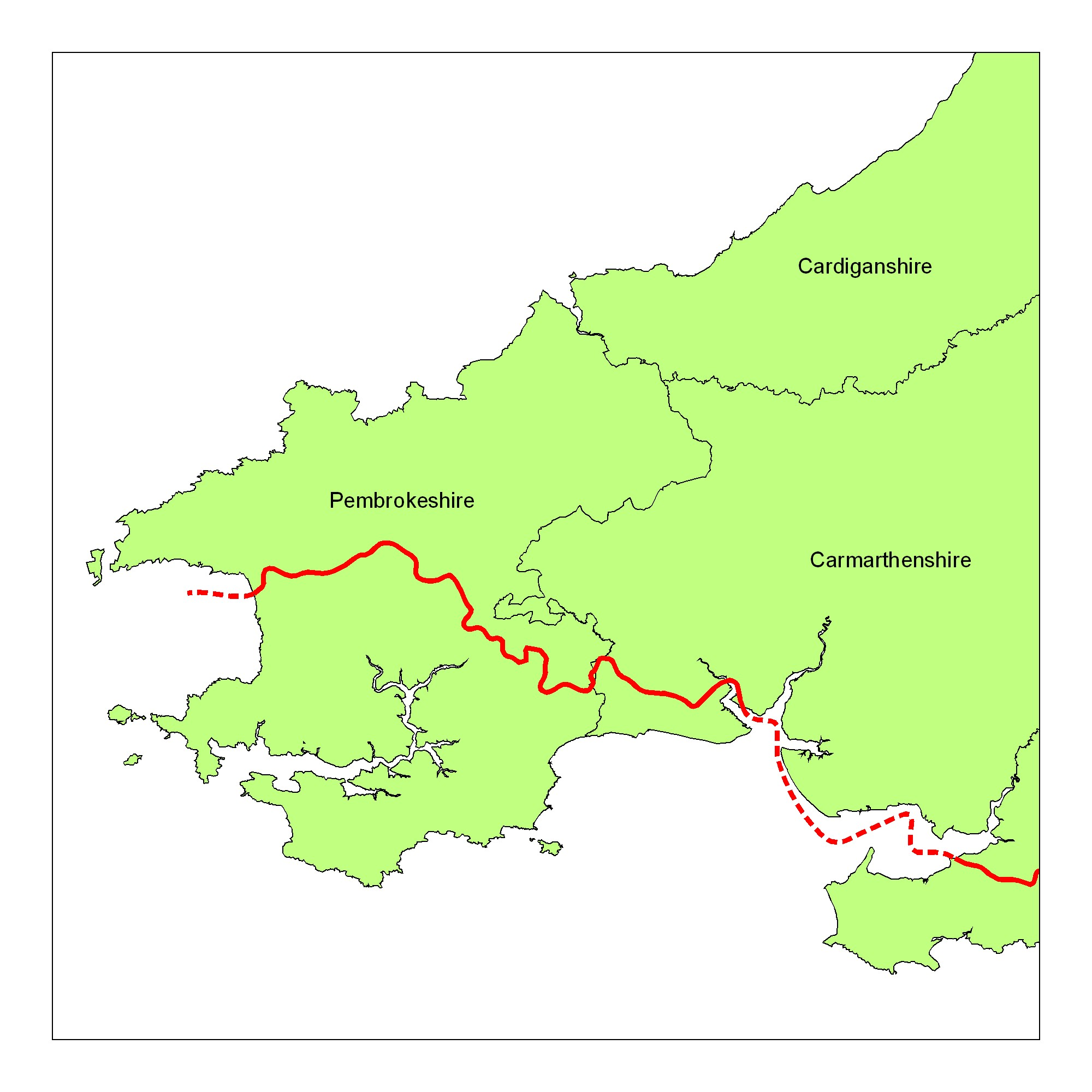
Landsker Line, 1901

In this locale the route crosses the imaginary Landsker Line marking the change from the largely Welsh place names of north Pembrokeshire to the largely English place names in the south of the county.

=== Southern section ===
After the New Inn crossroads, the road slopes more gently downwards past Rosebush reservoir and Henry's Moat, leaving the National Park just before passing through the hamlet of Tufton, where the Tufton Arms, now a pub, stands. A much older hostelry (possibly dating back to the 13th century), known as Paltockes Inne or Poll-tax Inn (the latter as recently as 1895) still stands; it is now a private house bypassed by road straightening (the old road forded a stream, shown on modern maps as Portrux Ford). The road passes close by Llys-y-frân Country Park, through the village of Woodstock and past Scolton Manor, bridges the Carmarthen to Fishguard railway line, then passes through the hamlets of Bethlehem and Poyston Cross and the village of Crundale in Rudbaxton parish. The inn in Crundale was the Boot and Shoe Inn, now converted to two residential dwellings. The section between New Inn and Woodstock is on the 345 bus route.

South of Crundale, the road crosses an unnamed stream at Stephen's Ford Bridge, then crosses the A40 Haverfordwest bypass on a roundabout at Withybush, and ends at another roundabout at Prendergast in the centre of Haverfordwest, connecting with the A40 spur (Cartlet Road) and reconnecting with the A487.

== See also ==
- Preseli Mountains
- Pembrokeshire Coast National Park
