= Royal Charter Storm =

1859 storm in the Irish Sea

Coordinates: 53.354°N 4.235°W

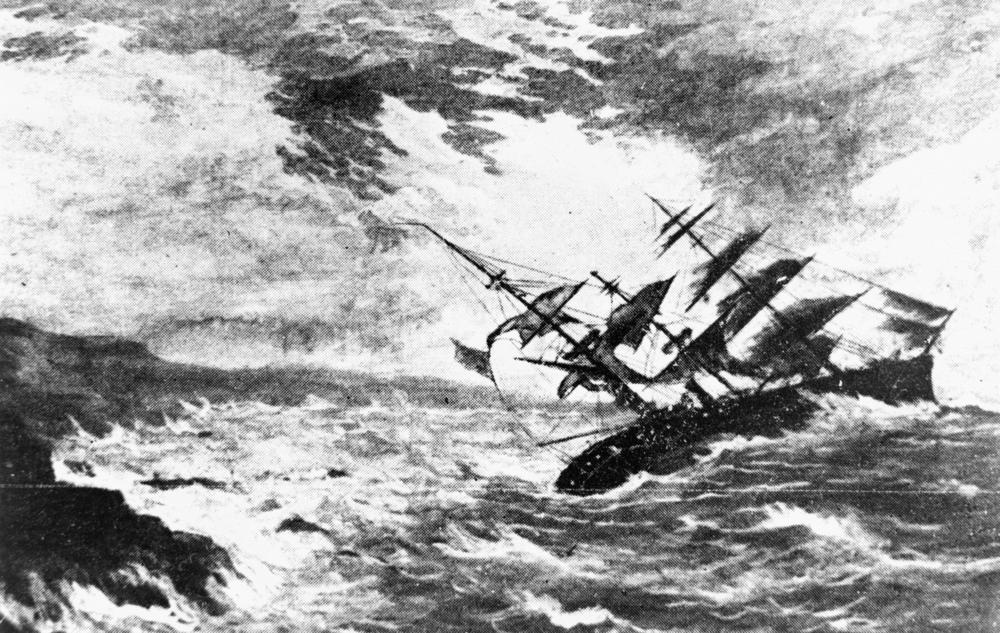
The Royal Charter

The Royal Charter Storm (also known as the Great storm of 1859) of 25‍–‍26 October 1859 was considered to be the most severe storm to hit the Irish Sea in the 19th century, with an estimated death toll of over 800. It takes its name from the Royal Charter ship, which was driven by the storm onto the east coast of Anglesey, Wales, with the loss of over 450 lives.

The storm followed several days of unsettled weather. The first indications were seen in the English Channel at about 3 p.m. on 25 October, when there was a sudden increase in the wind speed and a shift in its direction. There was extensive structural damage along the coasts of Devon and Cornwall. The storm drifted northwards, hitting Anglesey at about 8 p.m. and reaching maximum force at the River Mersey around midday on 26 October, before continuing northwards to affect Scotland. The winds reached force 12 on the Beaufort scale and were well over 100 mph (160 km/h). At the Mersey, a wind pressure of 28 pounds per square foot (1,300 Pa) was measured—higher than ever previously recorded.

== Royal Charter shipwreck ==
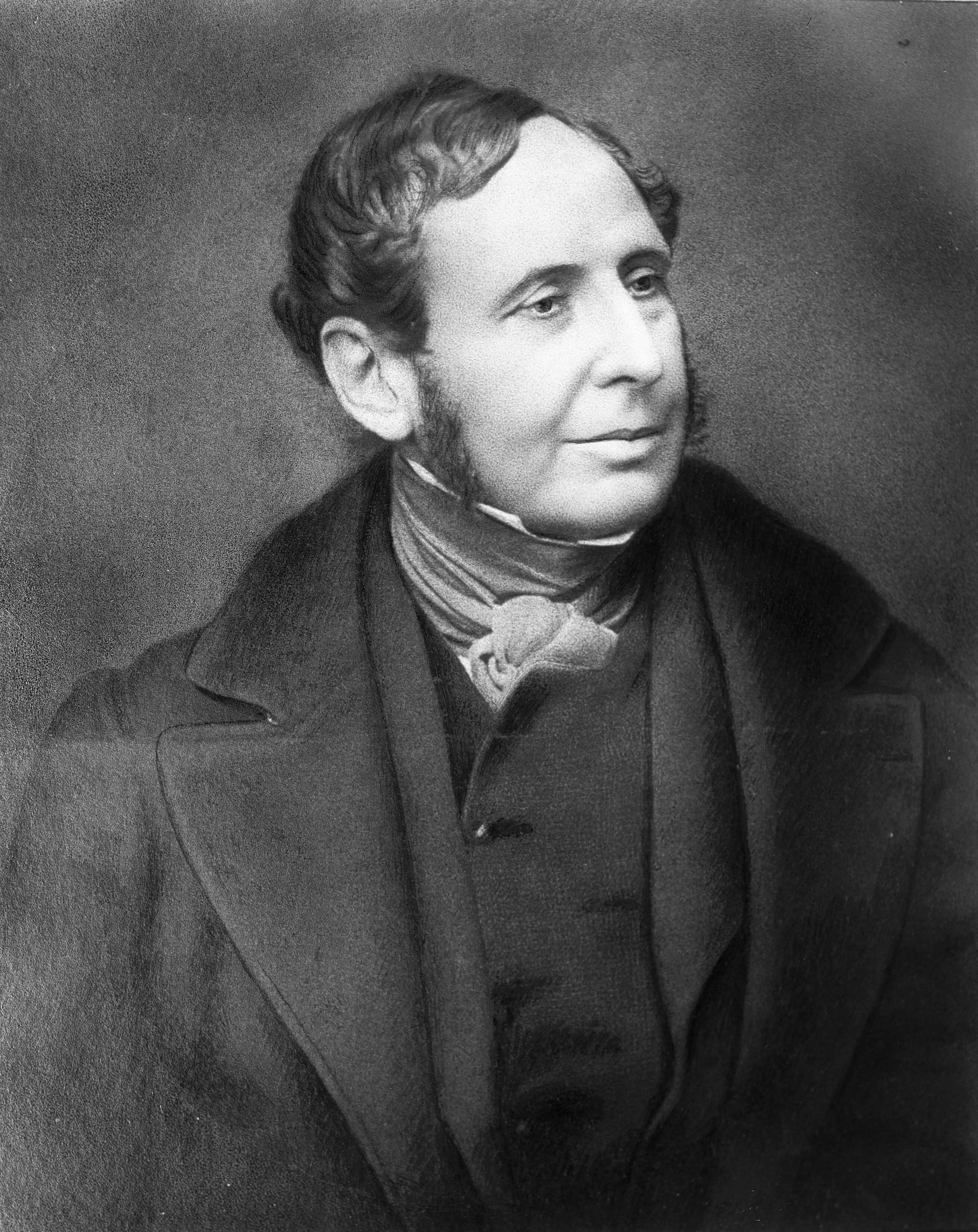
Robert FitzRoy

On the north coast of Anglesey, where the Royal Charter, a steam clipper, was approaching the end of her voyage from Melbourne to Liverpool, the wind at Point Lynas changed direction to ENE at 10 p.m. on 25 October and rose to gale force. By 10 p.m. the wind had reached force 10 and continued to increase, reaching force 12 by midnight. It continued to blow at force 12 until the afternoon of 26 October.

A Volunteer by Henry Nelson O'Neil, 1860, depicts the sinking of the Royal Charter

The Royal Charter was driven ashore on the east coast of Anglesey just north of the village of Moelfre in the early hours of the morning of 26 October 1859, eventually being smashed to pieces against the rocks, with the loss of over 450 lives. The public impact of the shipwreck may be judged by the fact that Charles Dickens travelled from London to Anglesey to report on the aftermath as described in The Uncommercial Traveller.

== Consequences ==
A total of 133 ships were sunk during the storm and another 90 badly damaged according to the Board of Trade records. The death toll was estimated at 800, including some people killed on land by falling rocks and masonry. Twice as many people died in these two days as had been lost at sea around the British Isles in the whole of 1858. There was extensive structural damage to many buildings, with the west coast of Great Britain being most severely affected. The remains of the church of Saint Brynach may still be seen at Cwm-yr-Eglwys in Pembrokeshire.

This storm had an effect on the development of the Meteorological Office as Captain Robert FitzRoy, who was in charge of the office at the time, brought in the first gale warning service in 1860 to prevent similar tragedies.

== See also ==
- List of United Kingdom disasters by death toll
