= Llanychaer =

Village and parish in Pembrokeshire, Wales

Coordinates: 51.97°N 04.94°W

Llanychaer: Welsh: Llanychâr
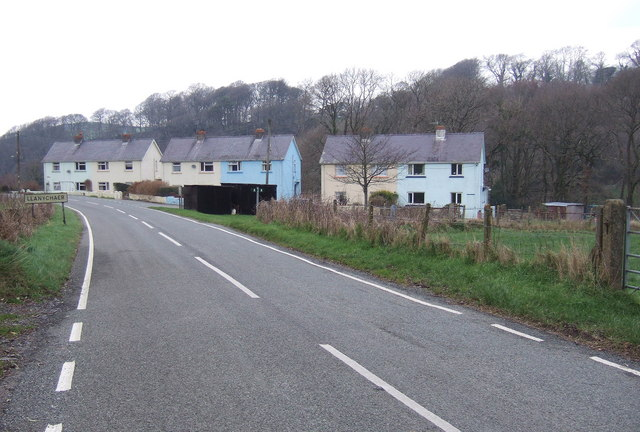

- Location within Pembrokeshire
- OS grid reference: SM9835
- Community: Cwm Gwaun
- Principal area: Pembrokeshire
- Country: Wales
- Sovereign state: United Kingdom
- Post town: Fishguard
- Police: Dyfed-Powys
- Fire: Mid and West Wales
- Ambulance: Welsh
- UK Parliament: Preseli Pembrokeshire
- Senedd Cymru – Welsh Parliament: Preseli Pembrokeshire

Llanychaer (Welsh: Llanychâr) is a small rural village and parish in the community of Cwm Gwaun, north Pembrokeshire, Wales. It is 2 miles (3.2 km) southeast of the port of Fishguard.

== Toponymy ==
Early forms of the place name indicate that the second element of the name Llanychaer was originally 'caeth', meaning serf or bondsman. The final sound gradually softened from 'th' to 'r', aided by the influence of 'caer', a common place name element denoting a fortress. Subsequently, the first element, which was originally 'Llannerch' meaning a clearing or glade, was re-interpreted as 'Llan y' meaning 'Church of'. Therefore the interpretation of the name shifted with pronunciation from 'Llannerch caeth' (glade of bondsmen) to 'Llan y caer' (church of the fortress). The standardised Welsh spelling of Llanychâr reflects the local dialectal shift of 'ae' to 'â'.

== History ==
Llanychaer was in the ancient hundred of Cemais. Early in the 19th century the population was 176 and only half the land in the parish was enclosed. Later in the century, it was described as hilly, much of which was pasture, with the village consisting of a few farmhouses.

Glandwr Baptist chapel in the village was built in 1894. The Reverend Carl D Williams, a well-known preacher in Wales, had been the minister for 28 years (in all, a minister for 50 years) until his retirement in 2010.

== Features ==
There are two bridges crossing the Gwaun in the north of the parish: at Cilrhedyn and Llanychaer. A disused mill close to the latter is recorded at the end of the 19th century.

== Parish ==
The parish is in the Diocese of St Davids, absorbed with two other parishes into the larger Parish of Fishguard of the Church in Wales. Llanychaer (as Llanachaier) appears on a 1578 parish map of Pembrokeshire. It is rural, with scattered settlements.

The parish church of St David dates back at least to the 12th century with evidence of earlier use as a place of worship, possibly as early as the 6th century. The present church was completely rebuilt on earlier foundations about 1876.
