= Morvil =

Parish in Pembrokeshire, Wales

Coordinates: 51.94°N 4.86°W

Morvil: Welsh: Morfil
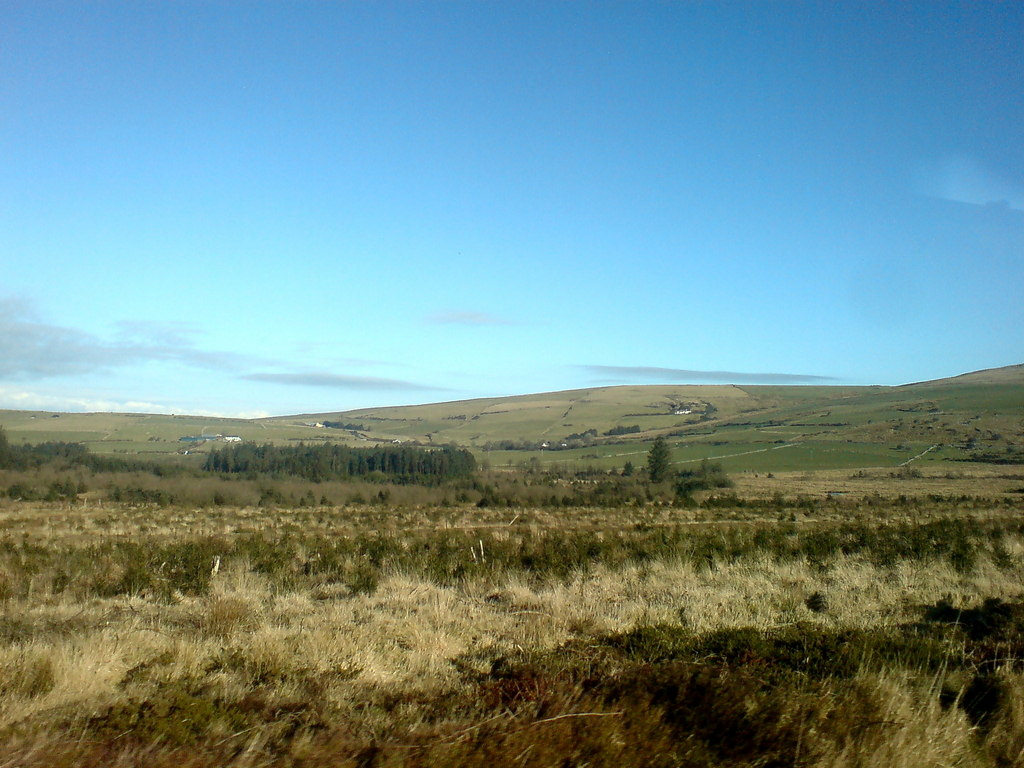
- Looking north to Mynydd Morvil showing the remoteness of the parish

- Location within Pembrokeshire
- OS grid reference: SN0330
- Principal area: Pembrokeshire
- Country: Wales
- Sovereign state: United Kingdom
- Police: Dyfed-Powys
- Fire: Mid and West Wales
- Ambulance: Welsh

Morvil or Morfil is a remote upland parish on the southern slopes of the Preseli Mountains in north Pembrokeshire, Wales. Fishguard is 6 miles (10 km) to the northwest. The area was occupied in Neolithic and Norman times, and in the past two centuries has been sparsely populated with no significant settlements developing. The parish church is dedicated to St John the Baptist.

== Geography ==
Morvil is in the community of Puncheston.

The area of the parish is 2,551 acres (1,032 ha) and includes the settlement at Greenway crossroads. In the north of the parish is Mynydd Morvil at 300 metres (980 ft), to the south is Mynydd Castlebythe at 347 metres (1,138 ft) and in the east is Banc Du at 334 metres (1,096 ft), making the parish, with an average elevation of some 250 metres (820 ft), nearly surrounded by mountains.

Afon Anghof, a feeder river for the Western Cleddau, rises in the northeast and flows westwards through the parish. The B4313 road runs through the parish and the B4329 cuts across the southeast corner; all other roads are unclassified. Most of the parish lies within the Pembrokeshire Coast National Park.

== History ==
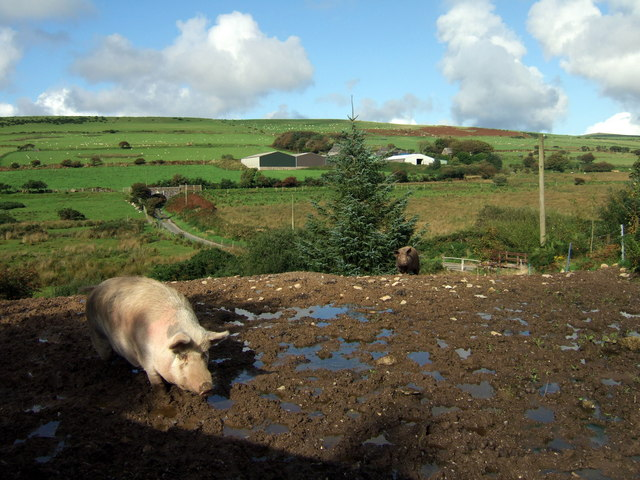
Morfil seen from Vaynor Isaf with the disused GWR line in between

In the northeast of the parish is Banc Du on which is a Neolithic enclosure (the first confirmed in Wales and mid-west Britain) which would have been occupied in the fourth and third millennia BC and is contemporary with megalithic tombs such as the long barrow at Pentre Ifan.

A degraded earthwork on Mynydd Morvil is marked on a 19th century map as Castell and as Earthwork on modern maps. Richard Fenton recounted a local tradition that a battle or skirmish was fought there between the Normans under Martin de Turribus (founder of Newport Castle) and the Welsh, a few days after his landing at Fishguard. The Welsh were repulsed.

Samuel Lewis, in the 1833 work A Topographical Dictionary of Wales stated:

This place is distinguished in the historical annals of the principality for the gallant resistance opposed by the Welsh to the encroachments of a party of Norman invaders, who in the latter part of the eleventh century, under the sanction of the reigning monarch, landed on the coast of Pembroke, with a view to establish themselves in such territories as they could obtain by conquest in this part of the principality.

It is possible that the name Morvil is Norman-French, similar to another village near Newport: Bayvil. In the Taxacio of 1291 the parish is named as Morvin, possibly erroneously. In the 13th century the manor of Redwalls (now Fagwyr Goch) was established to the west of Banc Du, and in 1293 Robert de Vale (Lord of Trefgarn) was granted a weekly market and three-day annual fair. The manor was still held by the Barony of Cemaes in 1594 but subsequently declined. In 1594 Morvil was assessed as two carucates of ploughland.

Morvil appears on a 1578 parish map of Pembrokeshire. Church records for the parish go back at least to 1653.

In the Hearth Tax assessments of 1670, in Morvill (sic) there were six people liable: William Edward, Jenkin Llewhelin, Owen Gwyther, David Young, Thomas John and Richard Morice; three were listed as paupers: Gwenllian John, Rees Edward and Walter Daniell.

Morvil is mentioned by Fenton in 1811 as being the home of Thomas Lloyd, Esq., and the Lloyds were a significant presence in the 17th century: among the items listed in an inventory of David Lloyd of Morvil in 1603 were a number of silver utensils. The houses of the wealthy were also a target for thieves; in the same year labourer David ap Ieuan was indicted for stealing silver items worth more than £13 from the mansion of Thomas Lloyd of Kilkiffeth.

Much of Morvil was unenclosed moorland until late 18th century enclosures resulted in large, regular fields, a process completed by the 1839 tithe survey. In 1833 the parish had 201 inhabitants, the highest since the first census in 1801. By 1872, the parish’s population was 125, with 26 houses. The population had fallen to 84 by 1961.

A branch line of the Great Western Railway (GWR) once ran through the parish, but there was no halt in Morfil. GWR was authorised to build and maintain this 13 mile line to Llanwnda in the late 1880s.

== Parish church ==
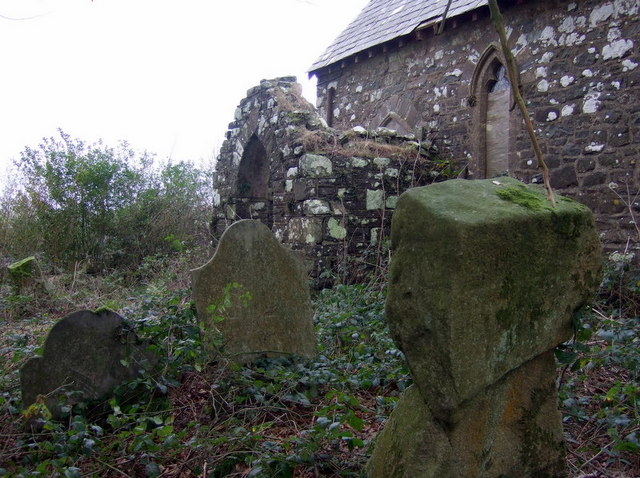
Ruined porch and neglected churchyard at Morvil church in 2008

The parish church of St John the Baptist is in the south of the parish. The Religious Census of 1851 stated the church to be “not yet in proper repair”, but the present structure dates from 1885–1893 and was photographed in poor condition in 2008. There are inscribed stones in the graveyard, in which the last burial was 1968. There are no chapels in the parish.
