= Dinas Island =

Peninsula in Pembrokeshire, Wales

Coordinates: 52.027°N 4.904°W

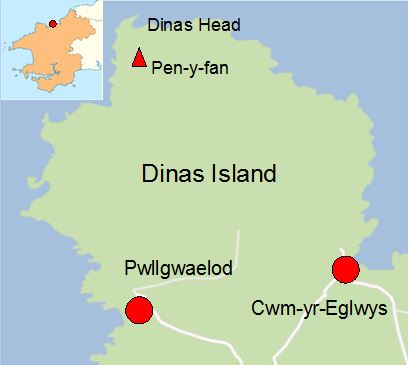
Dinas Island showing Pen-y-fan and Dinas Head Inset: location within Pembrokeshire

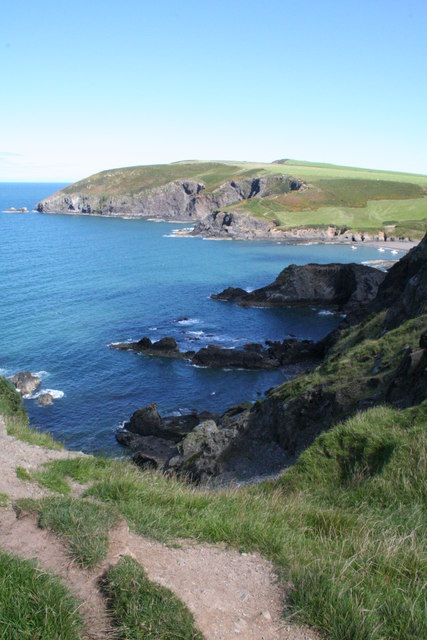
Pwllgwaelod beach, Dinas Island, on the extreme right

Dinas Island (Welsh: Ynys Dinas) is a peninsula, partially detached from the mainland, in the community of Dinas Cross between Fishguard and Newport, Pembrokeshire, in southwest Wales. A triangulation point shows 466 feet (142 m) above sea level at Pen-y-fan. Although Dinas Head is the northernmost part of the promontory where the cliffs meet the sea, the name is sometimes loosely used to refer to this highest point. Dinas Island is contained within the Pembrokeshire Coast National Park and the headland is under the care of the National Trust.

== Geography ==
The landward side of Dinas Island is bordered by a swampy valley cut by meltwater overflow from a glacial lake, melt water freed from reservoirs in the Preseli Hills by the dwindling ice. This was the same Ice Age melt-water that formed the Gwaun Valley further down the coast.

== Wildlife ==
Plant cover on Dinas Island is typical of a windswept cliff environment, with gorse, bracken and bramble, scrubby trees of hawthorn, blackthorn and hazel, and small oak and ash where there is shelter from the wind. There are also coastal wildflowers such as ling, scabious, thyme, heather, thrift, pennywort, foxglove, and orchids. Bluebells bloom in spring on the eastern slopes. Feral goats at one time inhabited the headland until they were destroyed in 1947.

== Pembrokeshire Coast Path ==
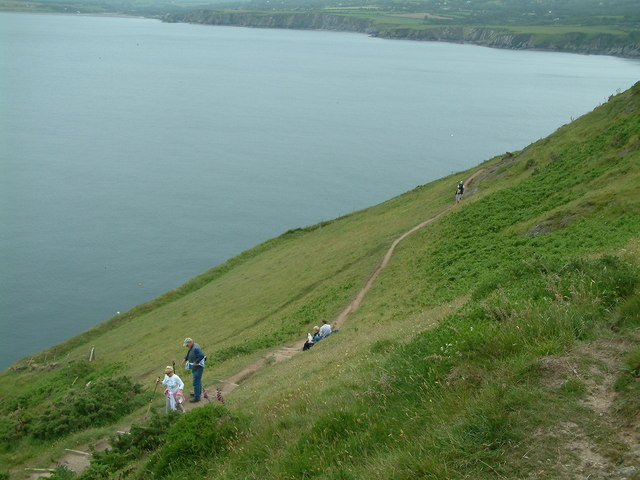
The coastal path near Dinas Head

The Pembrokeshire Coast Path, a 186-mile (299 km) national trail, runs for 3 miles (4.8 km) around the peninsula, offering extensive views towards Strumble Head and across both Fishguard and Newport Bay. This section of the path can be accessed from Pwllgwaelod at its southwestern end, and from Cwm-yr-Eglwys at its southeastern end. Both these locations can be reached from Dinas Cross on the A487, and offer parking and public toilets. A path, suitable for wheelchair access, links the two.

== Transport ==
Pwllgwaelod is served by the "Poppit Rocket", a bus which follows the coastline from Fishguard to Cardigan, Ceredigion in the north.

== Agriculture ==
Much of Dinas Island is given over to sheep pasture, and Dinas Island Farm – jointly owned and run by the National Trust and the Perkins family, and accessed from Pwllgwaelod – currently farms 1,600 Lleyn ewes plus 400 followers on 600 acres. In 2012 it won the Farmers Weekly Sheep Farmer of the Year Award and a National Grassland Management Award.
