= Cwm-yr-Eglwys =

Village and parish in Pembrokeshire, Wales

Coordinates: 52.02°N 4.89°W

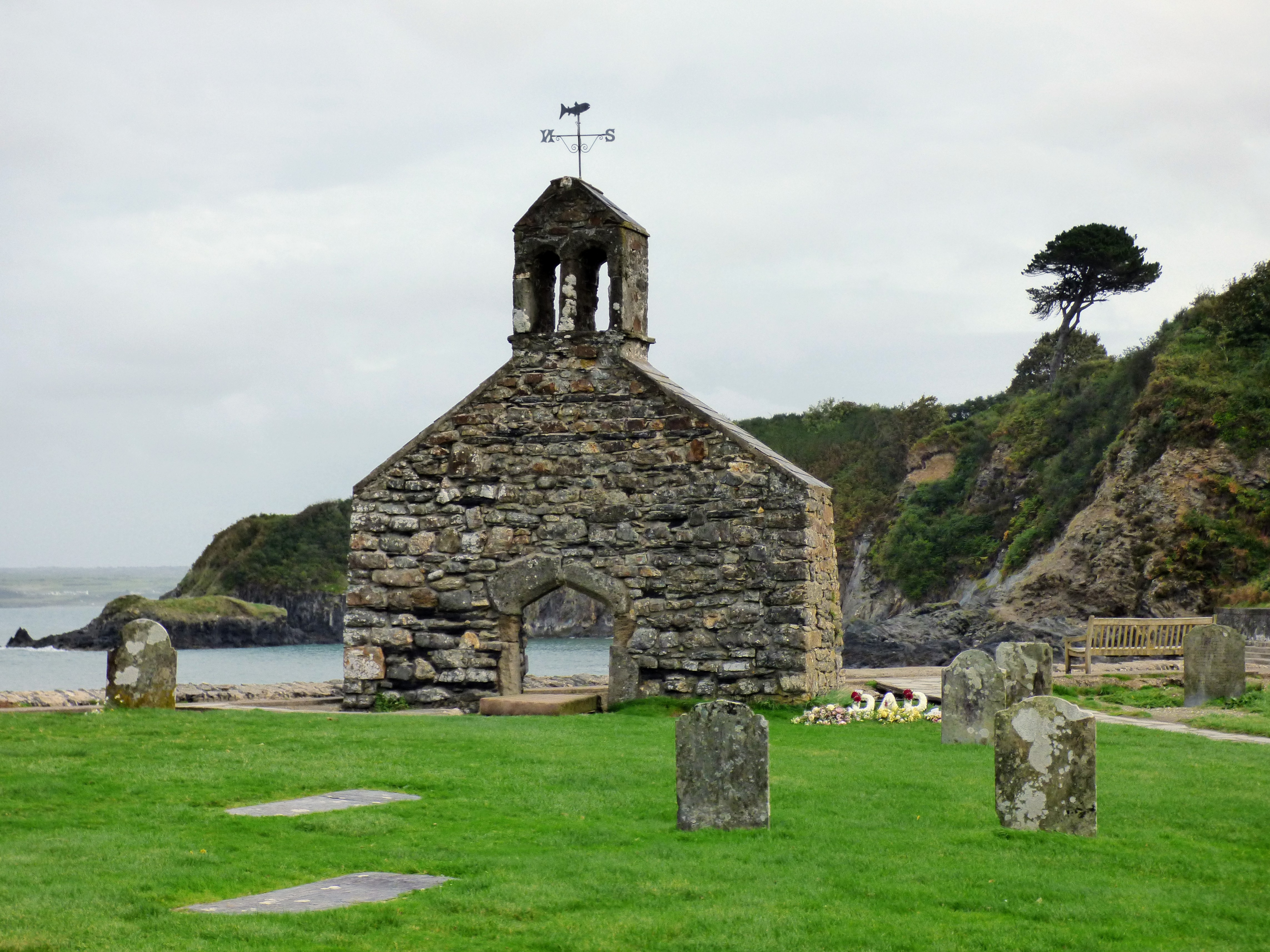
- The Church of St Brynach ruins Cwm-yr-Eglwys

- Location within Pembrokeshire
- Community: Dinas Cross
- Principal area: Pembrokeshire
- Country: Wales
- Sovereign state: United Kingdom
- Police: Dyfed-Powys
- Fire: Mid and West Wales
- Ambulance: Welsh

Cwm-yr-Eglwys (English: Valley of the Church) is a hamlet in a picturesque cove on the eastern side of the Dinas Island peninsula in the community of Dinas Cross between Fishguard and Newport, Pembrokeshire, in southwest Wales. It has a full-time population of around 10 people. There are 27 homes and a small private caravan site.

== Beach and facilities ==
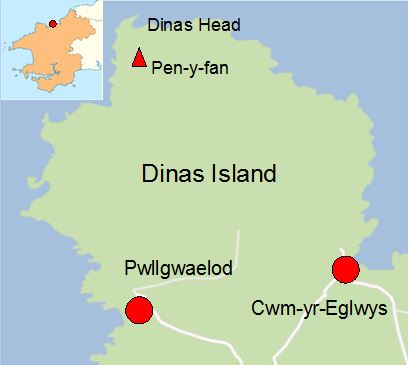
Pen-y-fan, 466 feet (142 m), Pwllgwaelod and Cwm-yr-Eglwys

The beach has earned a Seaside Award and a Green Coast Award, similar to a Blue Flag beach award but for rural beaches with safe bathing. There is a narrow slipway for launching small boats, limited car parking (charges applies at certain times) and a public toilet. Dogs are allowed on the beach. Holiday cottage lettings are available.

There is access to the Pembrokeshire Coast Path, which runs round to Pwllgwaelod, a cove on the opposite side of the peninsula. Alternatively, Pwllgwaelod may be reached via a purpose-built 1.25-mile (2 km) direct path through the wooded valley that almost divides Dinas Head from the mainland; being level, it is suitable for disabled access.

== Church of St. Brynach the Abbot ==
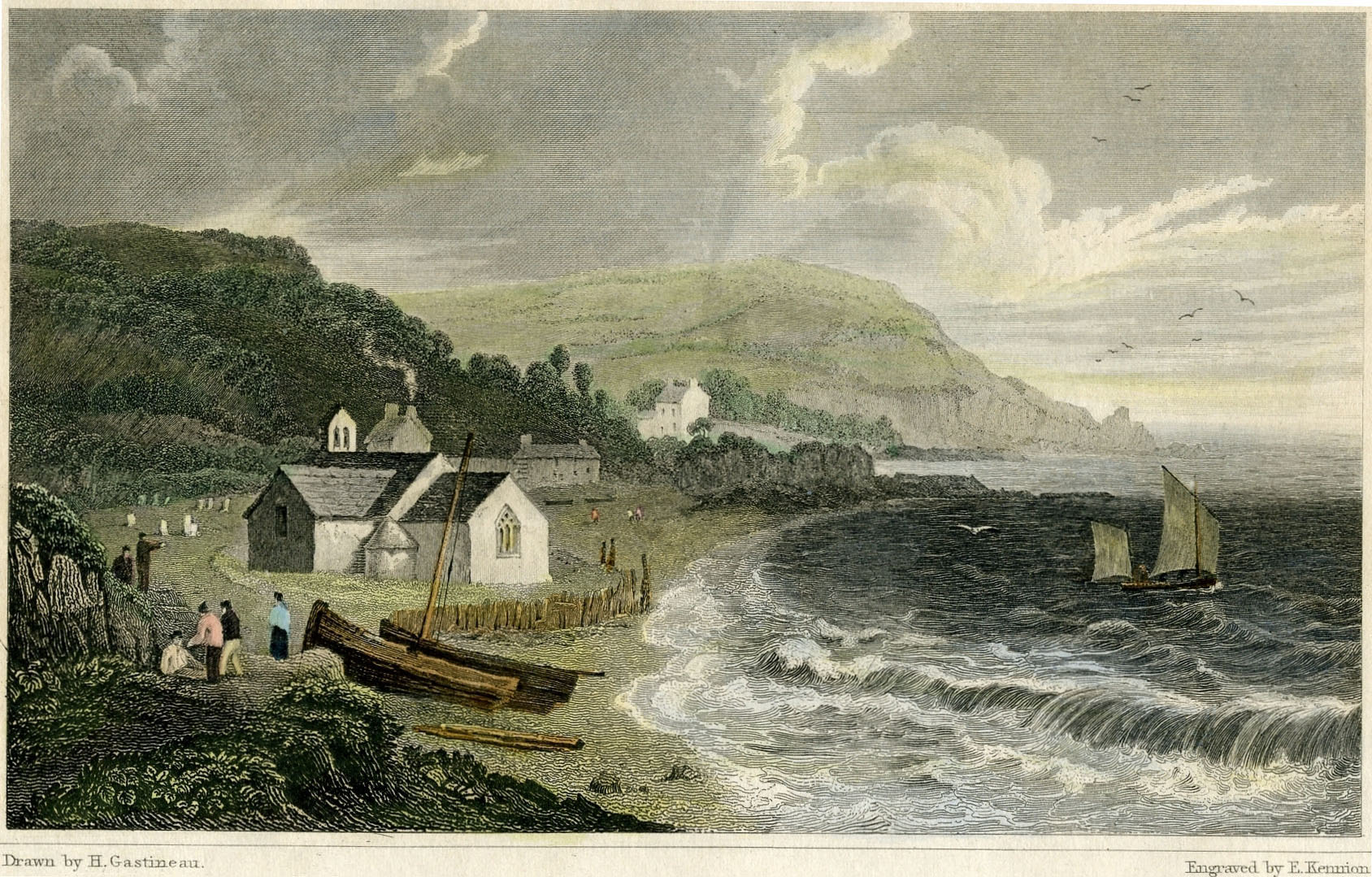
St Brynach's church before 1831, painted by Henry Gastineau (1791–1876)

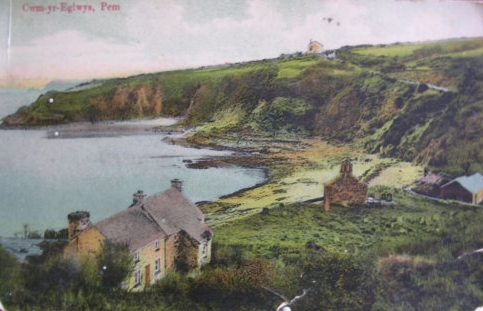
An old picture postcard of Cwm-yr-Eglwys (c 1910)

The church of St. Brynach is on the site of an ancient llan, and the dedication is pre-Norman. The building suffered storm damage in 1850 and 1851 when the chancel was destroyed by the sea, the church footings left hanging over an abyss. The graveyard was severely damaged, the level being reduced by at least three feet, exposing human remains in large quantity. The great storm of October 1859 (the Royal Charter Storm) removed the church roof and damaged the walls. The building was abandoned immediately.

In 1880, the remaining ruins were demolished apart from the west entrance wall. A new sea wall was built to protect what was left of the graveyard. In 1979, damage after another storm caused the sea wall to be repaired by Preseli District Council and the gravestones to be rearranged. The ruins of the church are now a popular tourist attraction and a pleasant public space.

There is a scale model of a Cwm Trader by the gate. This is type of coastal trading vessel that would have plied these waters.

== Climate ==
Sheltered from prevailing winds, Cwm-yr-Eglwys has its own microclimate, being a few degrees warmer and drier than other parts of the Pembrokeshire coast. This allows the growth of trees and shrubs of almost Mediterranean luxuriance.

== Regatta ==
A popular event every year, the Cwm-yr-Eglwys boat club reunites during the first two weeks of August for sailing events and regattas. The annual in-shore regatta is for families, comprising a whole day of swimming races, rowing races, sandcastle competitions and other activities. There are regular in-shore diving competitions and activities for children.
