= Henry's Moat =

Village and parish in Pembrokeshire, Wales

Coordinates: 51.913°N 4.846°W

Henry’s Moat: Welsh: Castell Hendre
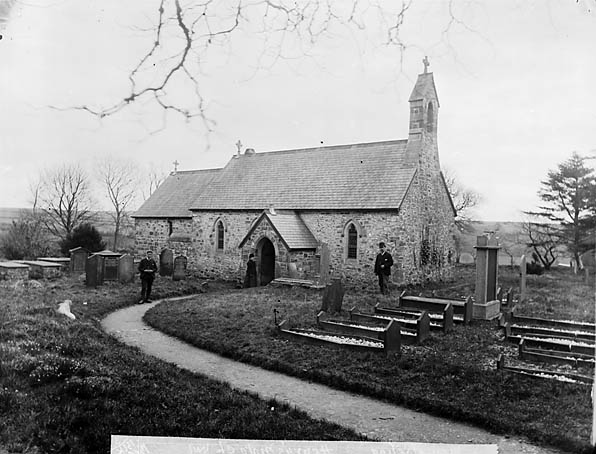
- St Brynach's Church, about 1885

- Location within Pembrokeshire
- OS grid reference: SN044276
- Community: Puncheston
- Principal area: Pembrokeshire
- Country: Wales
- Sovereign state: United Kingdom
- Post town: Clarbeston Road
- Postcode district: SA63
- Police: Dyfed-Powys
- Fire: Mid and West Wales
- Ambulance: Welsh
- UK Parliament: Preseli Pembrokeshire
- Senedd Cymru – Welsh Parliament: Preseli Pembrokeshire

Henry's Moat is a hamlet and parish in Pembrokeshire, Wales, in the community of Puncheston. It is 7 miles (11 km) southeast of Fishguard and 9 miles (14 km) northeast of Haverfordwest. The nearest railway station is Clarbeston Road 5 miles (8 km) to the south. It was in the ancient Hundred of Cemais.

== Name ==
The parish's Welsh name was Castell Hên-drêv (or Hendre), Anglicised by early English settlers to its present form. It derives from an ancient tumulus surrounded by a moat. It appears as Castel henrye on a 1578 parish map of Pembrokeshire.

== History ==
In 1833 the population of the parish was 282. It includes the hamlet of Tufton on the nearby B4329 Cardigan to Haverfordwest turnpike.

== Church ==
The parish church is dedicated to St Brynach (English: St Bernard).
