= Little Newcastle =

Village and parish in Pembrokeshire, Wales

Coordinates: 51.923°N 4.939°W

Little Newcastle: Welsh: Casnewydd-bach
- Location within Pembrokeshire
- OS grid reference: SM980290
- Community: Puncheston
- Principal area: Pembrokeshire
- Country: Wales
- Sovereign state: United Kingdom
- Post town: Haverfordwest
- Postcode district: SA62
- Dialling code: 01348
- Police: Dyfed-Powys
- Fire: Mid and West Wales
- Ambulance: Welsh
- UK Parliament: Ceredigion Preseli
- Senedd Cymru – Welsh Parliament: Preseli Pembrokeshire

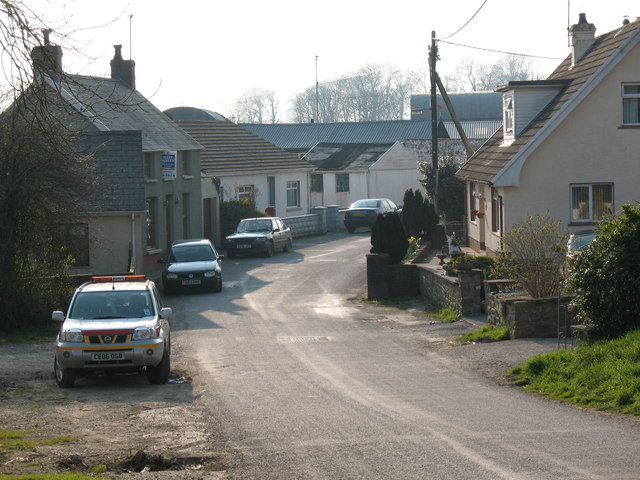
Village street in Little Newcastle

Little Newcastle (Welsh: Casnewydd-bach) is a village, parish and former civil parish in the community of Puncheston in Pembrokeshire, Wales. A map of 1578 shows the parish as Newcastle.

== Bartholomew Roberts ==
The village has attracted attention as the birthplace of the pirate Bartholomew Roberts (Barti Ddu), who was born in the village in 1682. Roberts is the most successful pirate of the Golden Age of Piracy, and is noted for creating a Pirate Code, and adopting an early variant of the Skull and Crossbones flag.

There is a monument to him in the village.

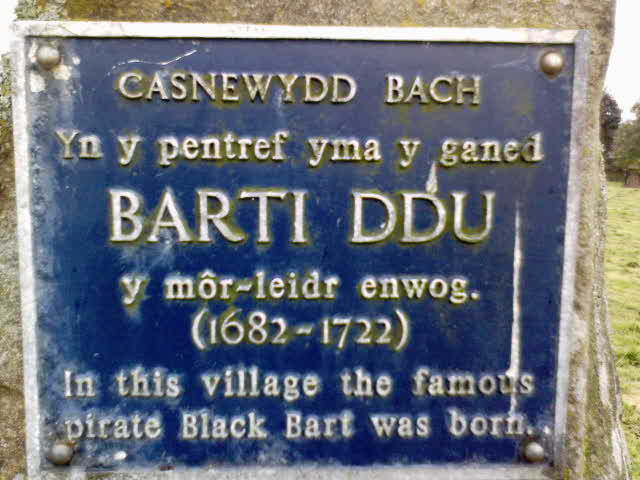
Bart Roberts' memorial stone in the village giving him under his nickname "Barti Ddu" ("Black Bart")

== St Peter's Church ==
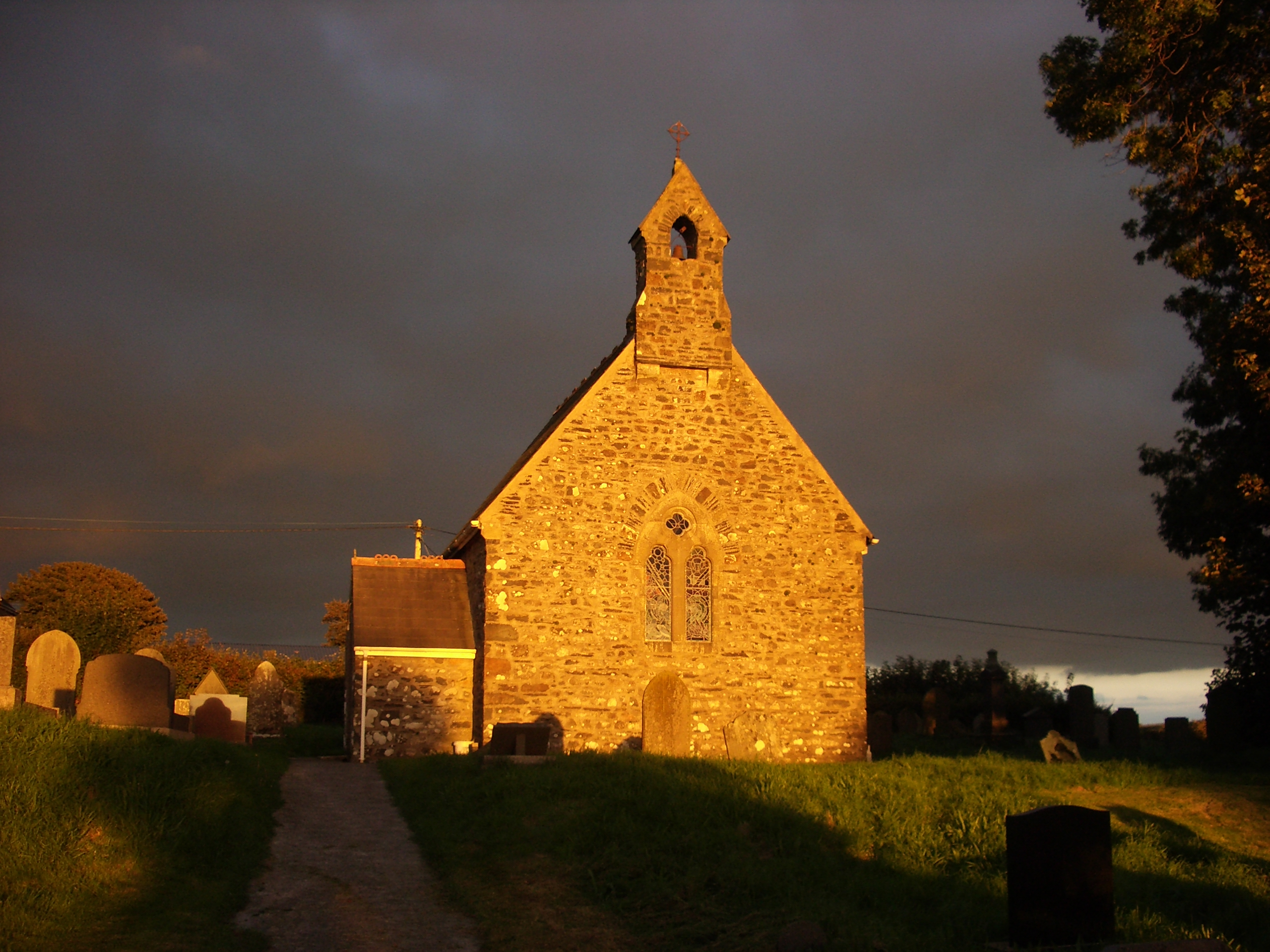
St. Peter's Church in Little Newcastle

St Peter's Church has medieval origins, but was heavily restored in 1870. It is now notable for its collection of modern stained glass windows, commissioned from 1990 onwards. The church is now part of the United Benefice of West Cemaes.
