= Pwllgwaelod =

Hamlet in Pembrokeshire, Wales

Coordinates: 52°01′17″N 4°54′31″W

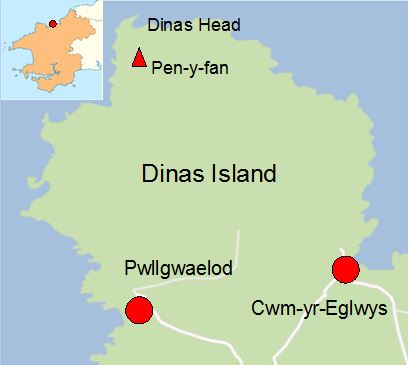
Dinas Island showing Pen-y-fan, its highest point, and Dinas Head. Also shown are the small settlements of Cwm-yr-Eglwys and Pwllgwaelod. Inset: location within Pembrokeshire

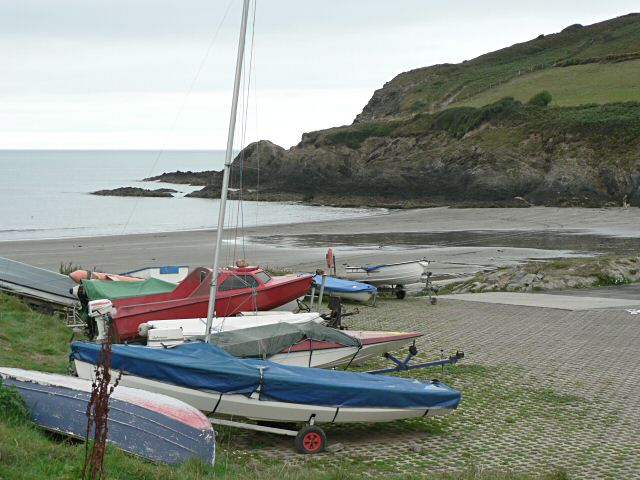
Pwllgwaelod beach

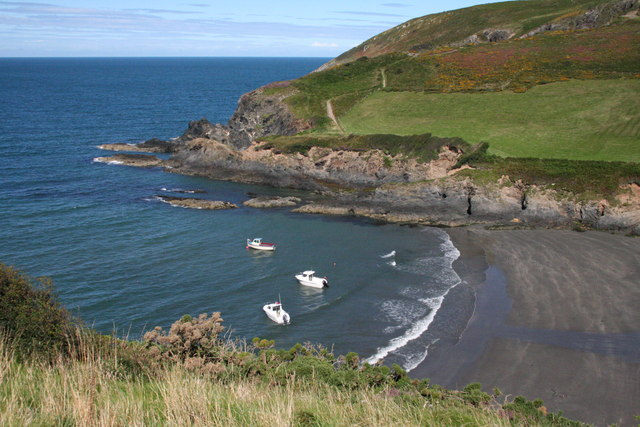
Pwllgwaelod beach

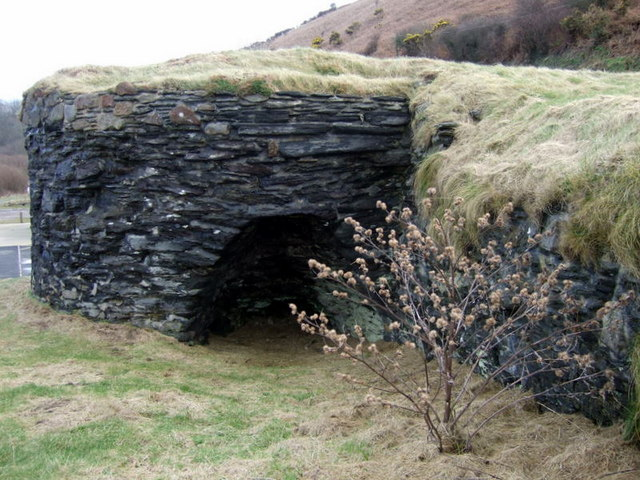
The lime kiln at Pwllgwaelod

Pwllgwaelod (originally Y Pwll Gwaelod, Welsh for The Bottom Cove/Creek) is a small scattered hamlet centred on a bay on the south-western side of the Dinas Island peninsula. It is in the community of Dinas Cross between Fishguard and Newport, Pembrokeshire, Wales. Many of the properties within the hamlet of Pwllgwaelod are holiday cottages.

== The beach ==
The small sandy beach, which is wide and open, with fine dark sand, has rocks and cliffs on either side, making it protected and unsuitable for watersports such as surfing. It offers good views across Fishguard Bay to Fishguard Harbour.

Pwllgwaelod beach failed to meet EU water quality standards in 2011 and 2012, possibly as a result of landwater run-off following two exceptionally wet summers. Nearby Cwm-yr-Eglwys has a Green Coast Award and a Seaside Award.

== Access and facilities ==
Pwllgwaelod is reached by a narrow, twisty road from the centre of Dinas Cross (on the A487). In the summer months (May - September) it is also served by the "Poppit Rocket", a bus which follows the coastline from Fishguard to Cardigan in the north.

Pwllgwaelod lies on the Pembrokeshire Coast Path which from here runs for 3 miles all round the peninsula of Dinas Island, reaching Cwm-yr-Eglwys on the other side. Cwm-yr-Eglwys can also be reached by a direct footpath (a little over a mile in length) through the valley that almost divides Dinas Head from the mainland, and is suitable for wheelchairs.

There are two car parks and public toilets, and the boat-park has a slipway for launching dinghies. Dogs are allowed on the beach.

== The Old Sailors ==
Close to the beach is an old pub, now a bar/restaurant called the Sailors Safety. This is the only building by the beach itself, and has seen some 500 years of use (although it closed for a period from 1994). Originally called the Sailors Safety, it changed to the Old Sailors before going back to the original name. It supposedly dates from 1593, the original name referring to the light it once kept burning as a guide to ships. It was visited by Dylan Thomas at least once.

== A harbour ==
Pwllgwaelod was at times used as a sheltered harbour when strong winds from the east made Fishguard dangerous.

There is a medium-sized "three-quarter" lime kiln by the beach, used for converting the limestone brought in by boat to quicklime. This was used on the land, in this case on Dinas Island.

== In literature ==
Pwllgwaelod is mentioned in "Sailing directions for the West Coast of England" , published by the Admiralty Hydrographic Department in 1870 :

There is a similar but smaller beach, the Pwll-gwaelod, which terminates a small strip of swamp that lies within Dinas head, and almost insulates it. This beach has better shelter than that of Goodie*, and small vessels frequently beach upon it in fine weather and easterly winds. (* ie. Goodie Sands, by Fishguard)

In "A Book of South Wales" , published in 1905, Sabine Baring-Gould wrote:

Now the story goes that under the sea by Dinas Point, in Pwll Gwaelod, lies a fairy city inhabited by a mysterious people called the Bendith y Mamau (the Blessing of the Mothers). When the sea is calm, through the crystal waters can be seen the golden roofs and spires and marble palaces of the underwater folk. The vision lasts for from five to ten minutes at a time. One day a ship of a Dinas fisherman cast anchor in the Pwll, when up the chain came swarming one of these subaqueous people, who stepped on deck and said to the captain, "What is this that you are doing? Your anchor is in the roof of my house." The captain promised to disengage it and not cast anchor there again.
