= Cwm Gwaun =

Coordinates: 51.968814°N 4.866606°W

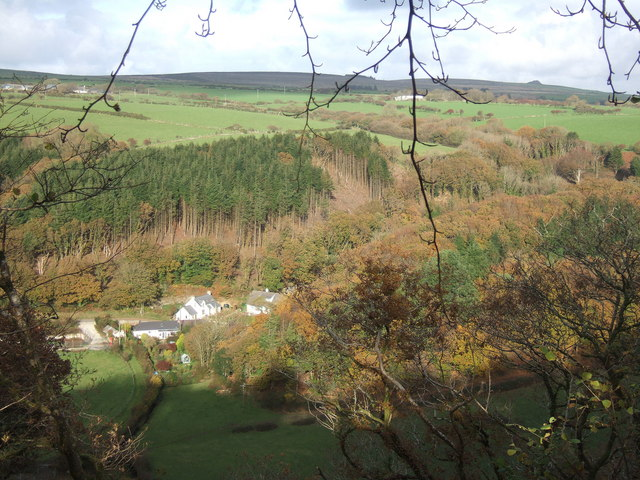
- Cwm Gwaun
- Population: 313 (2011)
- Principal area: Pembrokeshire
- Preserved county: Dyfed
- Country: Wales
- Sovereign state: United Kingdom
- Post town: Fishguard
- Postcode district: SA65 9
- Police: Dyfed-Powys
- Fire: Mid and West Wales
- Ambulance: Welsh
- UK Parliament: Preseli Pembrokeshire
- Senedd Cymru – Welsh Parliament: Ceredigion Penfro
- List of places UK Wales Pembrokeshire Map of the community

Cwm Gwaun (Welsh for 'Gwaun Valley') is a community and valley in north Pembrokeshire, Wales. The community is centred around Pontfaen, a parish and hamlet 4 miles (6.4 km) southeast of Fishguard, and includes the ancient parish of Llanychaer. In 2011, the population was 313. The valley is known for its unspoilt nature and old-world pub, and there are numerous other listed buildings.

== Geography ==
The community's area is 3,870 hectares (14.9 mi^{2}). The Companion Guide to Wales describes Cwm Gwaun as "one of the most important meltwater channels from the last ice age to be found in the British Isles." The River Gwaun rises in the Preseli Mountains near the village and its tributaries have carved heavily wooded steep, narrow side-valleys. To the northwest are hills such as Mynydd Dinas and Mynydd Melyn and the valley forms a notable wetland. Trees found in the valley include sessile oak, beech, alder, rowan, ash and willow. The valley is a nature walk of 5 miles (8.0 km) in the Pembrokeshire Coast National Park. The Rough Guide to Wales (Cwm Gwaun and the inland hills) says of the community, "Cwm Gwaun, the valley of the burbling River Gwaun is one of the great surprises of Pembrokeshire – a bucolic vale of impossibly narrow lanes, surrounded by the bleak shoulders of bare mountains."

== New Year celebrations ==
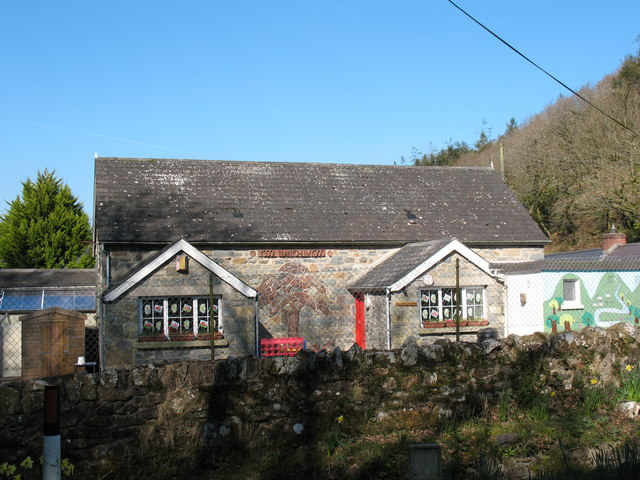
Cwm Gwaun Primary School

The locals continue to follow the tradition of the pre-1752 Julian calendar and celebrate New Year (Welsh: Hen Galan) on 13 January. Children walk from house to house, and sing traditional Welsh language songs. In return, householders provide gifts, or calennig, of sweets and money. In 2012, it was reported that most children from the local primary school would be absent that day to take part in the celebrations.

== Notable landmarks ==
There are 21 listed buildings in the Gwaun valley, including the parish church and Dyffryn Arms. Two bridges, at Llanychaer and Picton Mill, are Grade II listed.

The community (Pontfaen) has a primary school (Ysgol Llanychllwydog).

The Gwaun Valley contains a brewery at the Kilkiffeth Farm. A small hydroelectric power scheme is running at Pontfaen, whose output is sufficient to power some 70 homes.

The village pub is the Grade II-listed Dyffryn Arms, known locally as Bessie's and run by Bessie Davies's family since 1845. The pub was originally called Llwyn Celyn (Holly Bush). In 2011 it featured in S4C's Straeon Tafarn series. In 2015 it featured in the Good Beer Guide for a 40th successive year. In February 2019 it suffered a significant fire, but reopened in June.

== Hen Galan ==
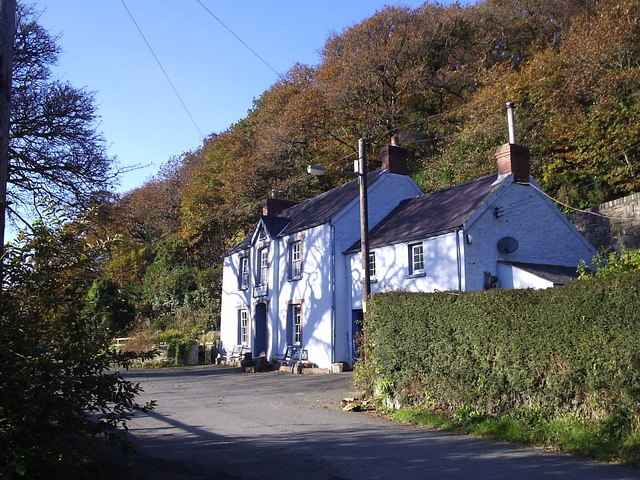
The Dyffryn Arms, Pontfaen a Grade II listed building and the centre for Hen Galan celebrations.

The community is known for continuing celebrations of Old New Year (Welsh: Hen Galan). Traditional festivities begin the night before with celebrations centered on the Dyffryn Arms.

The celebration continue into the day itself with a Mari Llwyd, the making of apple charms named "perllan" and the collecting of calennig, where local children are absented from primary school to travel from house to house singing traditional Welsh language songs. In return, the householders would historically give the children food to help through the winter months but in recent years the children are given sweets and money. Residents who did not welcome and reward the visitors were thought to get a "llond y tŷ o fwg" (English: a house full of smoke), meaning a year of bad luck.

== Worship ==
There are two places of worship: the Grade II listed medieval church of St Brynach (Church in Wales), which is open daily to visitors, and Jabes Baptist Chapel, one of the few remaining chapels in Wales that have an outdoor baptistry that is filled from the local river. The chapel was built in 1803 and restored in 1903.
