= River Gwaun =

Afon Gwaun River Gwaun
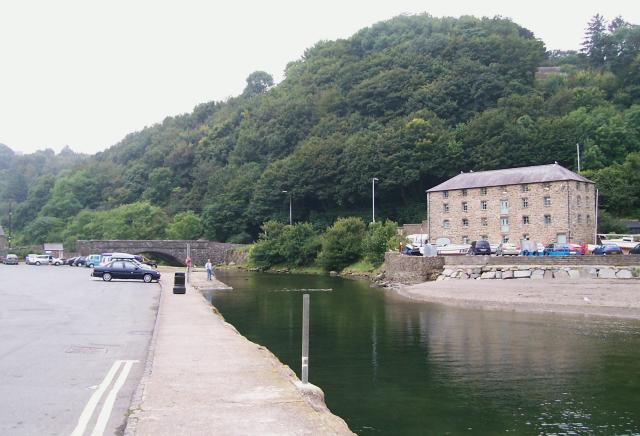

Location
- Country: Wales
- Counties: Pembrokeshire
- Towns: Fishguard

Physical characteristics
- Source
  - location: Preseli Hills
  - coordinates: 51.9580°N 4.8043°W
- Mouth
  - location: Fishguard, Pembrokeshire
  - coordinates: 51.9959°N 4.9696°W
- Length: 15 km (9.3 mi)

The River Gwaun (Welsh: Afon Gwaun, "Gwaun" meaning 'marsh, moor') is a river in Pembrokeshire, West Wales, which flows west to the sea at Fishguard (Welsh: Abergwaun - 'mouth of the Gwaun').

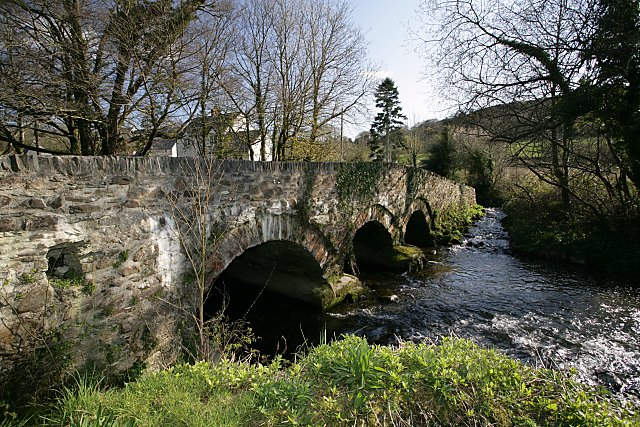
Llanychaer Bridge

The Gwaun rises in the Pembrokeshire Coast National Park on the northern slopes of Foel Eryr in the Preseli Hills, to the east of Pontfaen hamlet. The river is a slowly meandering stream passing through marshy, wet woodland with alder trees, water meadows and flood plains. Its river valley is deep and secluded through the Gwaun Valley, and passes through Pontfaen and Llanychaer to the sea at Lower Fishguard Bay.

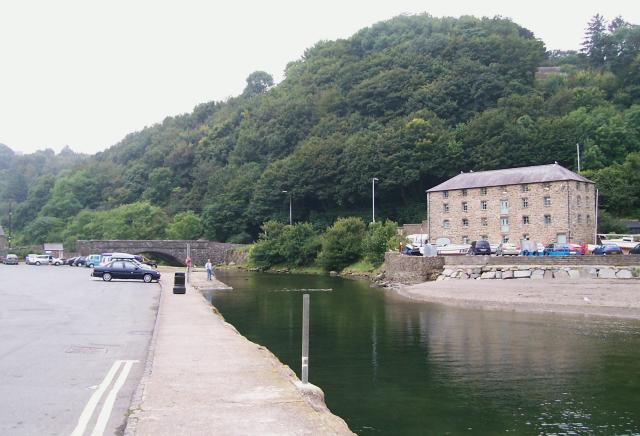
River Gwaun, Lower Fishguard

It has a total length of 9 miles (14 km) and is navigable by canoe for the lower third of its length, beginning west of Pontfaen. Before Pontfaen, the river is joined by the Afon Cwmau which flows from the south.

The river (as Gwyne) appears on a 1578 parish map of Pembrokeshire.

== Formation ==
The river occupies a meltwater channel formed subglacially during the last and earlier ice ages.
