= Puncheston =

Village, parish and community in Pembrokeshire, Wales

Puncheston: Welsh: Cas-mael
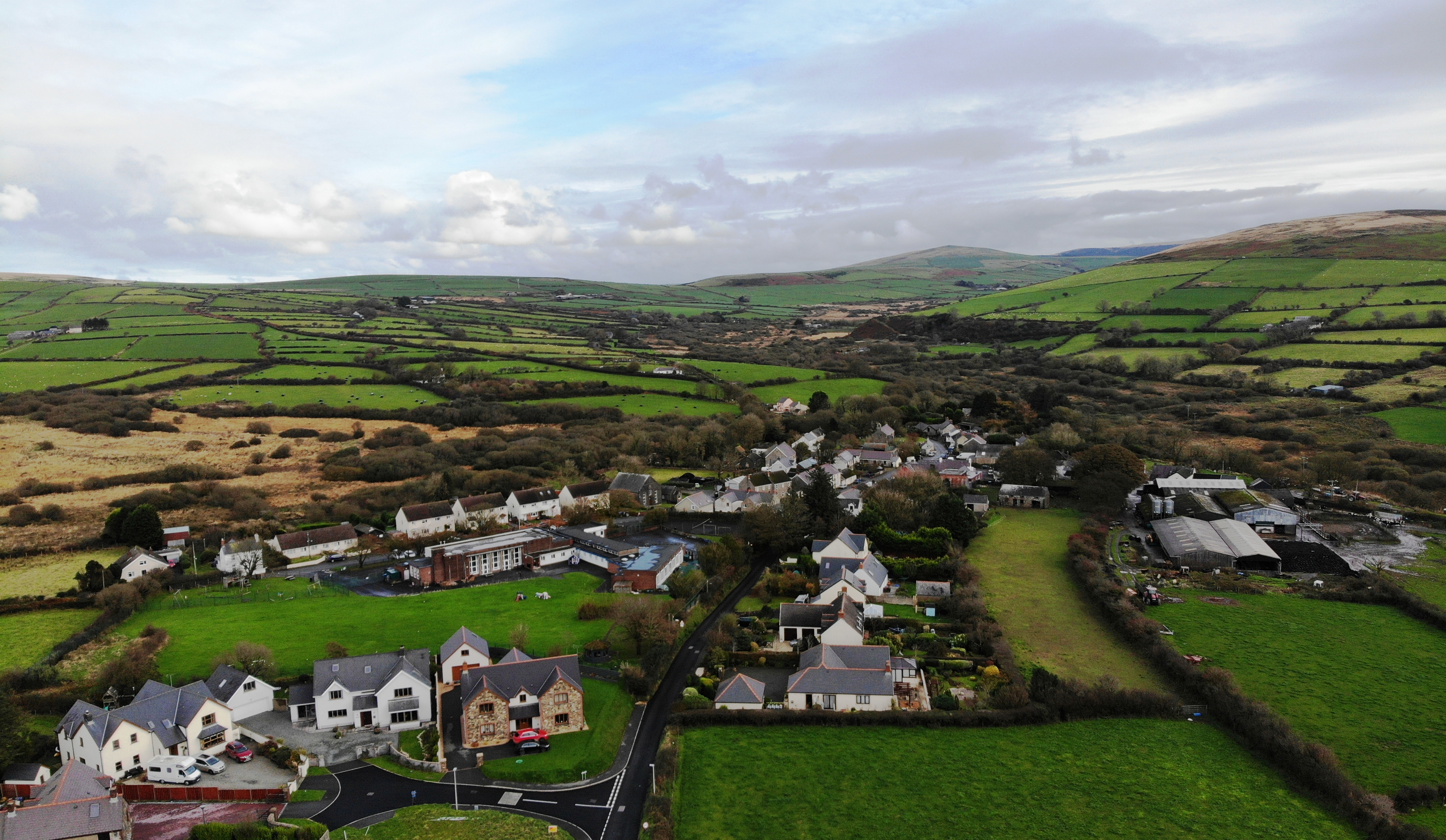
- Aerial view of the village, looking northeast

- Location within Pembrokeshire
- Population: 568 (2011)
- OS grid reference: SN007297
- Principal area: Pembrokeshire
- Country: Wales
- Sovereign state: United Kingdom
- Post town: Haverfordwest
- Postcode district: SA62
- Police: Dyfed-Powys
- Fire: Mid and West Wales
- Ambulance: Welsh
- UK Parliament: Preseli Pembrokeshire
- Senedd Cymru – Welsh Parliament: Ceredigion Penfro
- List of places UK Wales Pembrokeshire 51.93°N 4.90°W Map of the community

Puncheston (Welsh: Cas-mael or Casmael) is a village, parish and community in Pembrokeshire, southwest Wales.

It sits below the mountain known as Castlebythe (English: Cow Castle), one of the peaks in the Preseli Mountains, just outside the Pembrokeshire Coast National Park.

== Parish history ==
A map of 1578 shows the parish as Castle Male, presumably a phonetic spelling of the Welsh name by the English mapmaker. Lewis's Topographical Dictionary of 1844 gives 326 inhabitants (the 1849 edition gives 255) for the parish, which includes the village and a number of outlying residences and farms. Lewis surmises that the original name was Castell Mael, deriving from an ancient encampment of which there are remains. A railway passed through the parish in the 19th and 20th centuries, with a halt at the village.

== Community ==
The Community of Puncheston consists of the villages of Puncheston, Henry's Moat, Little Newcastle, Castlebythe, Morvil and Tufton. Henry's Moat Electoral Ward returns two councillors to Pembrokeshire County Council, and Puncheston Ward four.

== Education ==
Puncheston County Primary School is in the village.

== Notable people ==
- Bartholomew Roberts (1682–1722), pirate, known as 'Black Bart' (Welsh: Barti Ddu), was born in Casnewydd Bach near Puncheston.
- John Gambold (1711-1771), bishop of the Unitas Fratrum, was born in Puncheston, where his father was rector.
