= List of places in Pembrokeshire =

Location of towns (and a former town: Cilgerran) and the City of St David's in Pembrokeshire.

This is a list of cities, towns (and former towns), villages, parishes, communities and other places in Pembrokeshire, Wales.

Most places in blue have their own article; those in red do not (for which coordinates can usually be found in List of United Kingdom locations. Some (annotated ^{(r)}) are currently redirected to their parent parish (for which see GENUKI) or community (see list at the foot of this page) and may be sufficiently notable for their own article. Parishes and communities with the same name may not share the same boundaries. See also List of hundreds of Wales#Pembrokeshire for a list of medieval parishes.

GENUKI also has a list of Pembrokeshire place names extracted from Lewis's 1833-44 A Topographical Dictionary of Wales, which link to further sources and historical information.

Some are stub articles that need expanding; for a list, see Category:Pembrokeshire geography stubs.

For other principal areas in Wales, see List of places in Wales.

== A ==
- Abercych, Abereiddy, Abercastle, Albert Town^{(r)}, Ambleston, Amroth, Angle, Angle Bay, Axton Hill^{(r)}

== B ==
- Barafundle Bay, Bateman's Hill^{(r)}, Bayvil, Begelly, Bentlass, Bethlehem^{(r)}, Blaenffos, Bletherston, Boncath, Bosherston, Boulston, Brawdy, Bridell, Brimaston^{(r)}, Brithdir Mawr, Broadfield, Broad Haven, Broadmoor^{(r)}, Broadway^{(r)}, Broom^{(r)}, Brynberian, Brynhenllan, Burton, Bwlchygroes

== C ==
- Caerfarchell, Caldey Island, Camp Hill, Camrose, Canaston Bridge, Capel Colman, Carew, Carew Cheriton, Carew Newton^{(r)}, Carnhedryn, Carreg-wen, Castellan, Castlebythe, Castlemartin, Castlemorris, Ceibwr Bay, Churchton, Cilgerran, Cilgwyn^{(r)}, Cilrhedyn, Clarbeston, Clarbeston Road^{(r)}, Clunderwen, Clydau, Coedcanlas, Cold Blow, Cold Inn, Cosheston, Coxlake^{(r)}, Cresselly^{(r)}, Cresswell Quay^{(r)}, Crinow, Croes-goch, Cross Hands^{(r)}, Crosswell, Crow Rock, Crymych, Crundale, Crunwere, Cuffern^{(r)}, Cwmcych, Cwm yr Eglwys, Cippyn^{(r)}

== D ==
- Dale, Dinas Cross, Dreenhill^{(r)}, Druidston^{(r)}

== E ==
- East Williamston, Eglwyswen, Eglwyswrw

== F ==
- Fachelich, Felindre Farchog, Fishguard, Fishguard Bay, Flimston^{(r)}, Ford^{(r)}, Foxhall^{(r)}, Freystrop, Freshwater East, Freshwater West

== G ==
- Gelli, Glandwr, Glanrhyd^{(r)}, Glogue, Goodwick, Granston, Greenway, Gumfreston, Gwastad^{(r)}

== H ==
- Hakin, Haroldston St. Issell's, Haroldston West, Hasguard, Haverfordwest, Hayscastle, Hazelbeach^{(r)}, Henry's Moat, Herbrandston, Hermon, Hill Mountain, Hodgeston, Hook, Houghton, Hubberston, Hundleton

== J ==
- Jack Sound, Jameston, Jeffreyston, Johnston, Jordanston (Llanstadwell Community)^{(r)}, Jordanston (parish)

== K ==
- Keeston^{(r)}, Kilgetty, Kingheriot

== L ==
- Lambston^{(r)}, Lammas Ecovillage, Lampeter Velfrey, Lamphey, Lawrenny, Leonardston, Letterston, Liddeston, Little Haven, Little Hasguard^{(r)}, Little Honeyborough^{(r)}, Little Newcastle, Little Milford, Llanddewi Velfrey, Llandeilo Llwydarth, Llandeloy, Llandissilio, Llandruidion, Llanfair-Nant-Gwyn, Llanfair-Nant-y-Gôf, Llanfihangel Penbedw, Llanfyrnach, Llangloffan^{(r)}, Llangolman, Llangwm, Llanhowell^{(r)}, Llanion, Llanllawer, Llanreath, Llanreithan, Llanrhian, Llanstadwell, Llanstinan, Llanteg, Llantood, Llanungar, Llanwnda, Llanycefn^{(r)}, Llanychaer, Llanychlwydog, Llawhaden, Llys y Fran, Loveston^{(r)}, Ludchurch, Lydstep^{(r)}, Lydstep Haven

== M ==
- Maenclochog, Maiden Wells, Manorbier, Manorbier Newton, Manordeifi, Manorowen, Marloes, Martin's Haven, Martletwy, Mascle Bridge^{(r)}, Mathry, Meline, Merlin's Bridge, Middle Mill, Milford Haven, Millin Cross, Milton, Minwear, Molleston, Monington, Monkton, Morvil, Mounton, Moylgrove, Mynachlog-ddu

== N ==
- Narberth, Nash, Nevern, Newchapel, Newgale, New Hedges, New Moat, Newport, Newport Bay, Newton North^{(r)}, Newton Mountain, Neyland, Nine Wells, Nolton^{(r)}, Nolton Haven

== O ==
- Orielton

== P ==
- Panteg, Paran, Pembroke, Pembroke Dock, Pembroke Ferry, Penally, Penffordd, Pennar, Penparc, Penrydd, Pentlepoir, Pentre Galar, Pen-y-Bryn^{(r)}, Penycwm, Penygroes, Pleasant Valley, Pontfaen, Pontrhydyceirt, Pontyglasier, Port Lion, Porthclais, Portheiddy, Porthgain, Poyston Cross^{(r)}, Prendergast, Puncheston, Pwllcrochan, Pwllgwaelod

== R ==
- Ramsey Island, Redberth, Reynalton, Rhoscrowther, Rhoshill, Rhosson, Rhosycaerau, Robeston Wathen, Robeston West, Roch^{(r)}, Rogeston, Rosebush, Rosemarket, Rudbaxton

== S ==
- Sageston^{(r)}, Sandy Haven, Saundersfoot, Sardis (Saundersfoot community), Sardis (Burton community), Scleddau, Simpson Cross, Slebech, Solva, South Dairy, Spittal, Square And Compass, St Brides, St Brides Bay, St David's, St Dogmaels, St Dogwells, St Edrins, St Elvis, St Florence, St Ishmaels, St Issells^{(r)}, St Lawrence, St Nicholas, St Petrox, St Twynnells, Stackpole, Stackpole Estate, Star, Stepaside, Steynton, Summerhill

== T ==
- Talbenny, Tavernspite, Tegryn, Templeton, Tenby, Thomas Chapel, Thornton, Tiers Cross, Trecadwgan, Trecwn, Trefasser, Treffgarne, Treffgarn Owen, Treffynnon, Trefin, Tremaenhir, Tremarchog, Troopers Inn, Tufton

== U ==
- Upton, Uzmaston

== V ==
- Vorlan

== W ==
- Wallis^{(r)}, Walton East, Walton West, Walwyn's Castle, Warren, Waterston, West Williamston^{(r)}, Whitchurch, Whitechurch, Whitehill^{(r)}, Whitesands Bay, Wisemans Bridge, Wiston, Withybush^{(r)}, Wood, Wooden, Woodstock, Wind Mill Hill, Wolf's Castle, Wolfsdale^{(r)}

== Y ==
- Yerbeston^{(r)}

== See also ==
- List of places in Pembrokeshire (categorised)
- List of United Kingdom locations
