= List of prehistoric scheduled monuments in north Pembrokeshire =

Pembrokeshire is the fifth-largest county in Wales, but has more scheduled monuments (526) than any except Powys. This gives it an extremely high density of monuments, with 33.4 per 100 km^{2}. (Only the tiny county boroughs of Newport and Merthyr Tydfil have a higher density). With three-quarters of its boundary being coastline, Pembrokeshire occupies the western end of the West Wales peninsula, terminating with the tiny cathedral city of St David's. It was a historic county in its own right but between 1975 and 1996 it joined Carmarthen and Ceredigion in the much larger county of Dyfed.

Over two-thirds of Pembrokeshire's scheduled monuments (346) date to pre-historic times. Even this is too many entries to conveniently show in one list, so the list is subdivided into three, separating the Roman to modern on one list, and subdividing the prehistoric sites along the lines of the former local districts of Preseli Pembrokeshire, (the northern half) and South Pembrokeshire. The list below shows the 233 sites in the north. This includes hill forts, promontory forts on both coastal headlands and inland locations. It also includes a variety of enclosures, hut sites and Raths, a wide range of burial sites and other ritual and religious sites listed as barrows and chambered tombs, stone circles and standing stones. There is a matching list of 113 prehistoric sites in south Pembrokeshire.

The county's 182 Roman, medieval and post-medieval sites are all included in the third Pembrokeshire list, which covers inscribed stones, stone crosses, holy wells, castles, mottes and baileys, priories, chapels and churches, houses, town walls and a Bishop's palace, along with a wide variety of post-medieval sites from coalmines, kilns and dovecotes through to World War II defensive structures.

Scheduled monuments have statutory protection. The compilation of the list is undertaken by Cadw Welsh Historic Monuments, which is an executive agency of the National Assembly of Wales. The list of scheduled monuments below is supplied by Cadw with additional material from RCAHMW and Dyfed Archaeological Trust.

== Scheduled monuments in north Pembrokeshire ==
| Image | Name | Site type | Community | Location | Details | Period | Schedule number and references |
|---|---|---|---|---|---|---|---|
| Parc-y-Llyn burial chamber | Parc-y-Llyn Burial Chamber | Chambered tomb | Ambleston | 51.9012°N 4.9343°W, SM982265 | A capstone resting on four low uprights. Although scheduled, questions have been raised about its authenticity. It was first noted in 1871. | Neolithic | PE133 |
| | Bay View Farm Defended Enclosure | Enclosure (archaeology) – Defensive | Brawdy | 51.866°N 5.1219°W, SM851232 | | Prehistoric | PE540 |
| | Brandy Brook Camp | Enclosure | Brawdy | 51.8712°N 5.0791°W, SM881237 | | Prehistoric | PE363 |
| | Brawdy Promontory Fort | Promontory fort – inland | Brawdy | 51.8732°N 5.1061°W, SM862239 | | Prehistoric | PE422 |
| | Castle Villa Camp | Enclosure | Brawdy | 51.9071°N 5.0811°W, SM881277 | | Prehistoric | PE222 |
| | Dinas Fach Defended Enclosure | Promontory fort – coastal | Brawdy | 51.8621°N 5.1592°W, SM825228 | | Prehistoric | PE539 |
| | Tre-Ffynnon Burial Chamber | Chambered tomb | Brawdy | 51.915°N 5.1223°W, SM853286 | In an arable field east of Trefynnon. Three uprights support a 2m capstone. The chamber is filled with field clearance stones. | Prehistoric | PE027 |
| The Hanging Stone, Burton | Burton Burial Chamber | Chambered tomb | Burton | 51.7359°N 4.9382°W, SM972082 | Also called The Hanging Stone. Three uprights support a large, tall capstone with a flat base. | Neolithic | PE066 |
| | Crowhill Rath | Promontory fort – inland | Camrose | 51.8172°N 4.9752°W, SM950174 | | Prehistoric | PE218 |
| | Keeston Castle | Hillfort | Camrose | 51.8353°N 5.0519°W, SM898195 | | Prehistoric | PE216 |
| | Plumstone Mountain Round Barrow (East) | Round barrow | Camrose | 51.8723°N 5.0185°W, SM923236 | | Prehistoric | PE519 |
| | Plumstone Mountain Round Barrows (West) | Round barrow | Camrose | 51.8706°N 5.0339°W, SM912234 | | Prehistoric | PE153 |
| | Plumstone Rath | Rath | Camrose | 51.8686°N 5.0197°W, SM922232 | | Prehistoric | PE220 |
| | Plumstone Rock Round Barrows | Round barrow | Camrose | 51.8704°N 5.0269°W, SM917234 | | Prehistoric | PE219 |
| | Rath 150m SE of Pelcomb Farm | Rath | Camrose | 51.8165°N 4.9922°W, SM938173 | | Prehistoric | PE090 |
| | Round Barrow 100m E of Thornbush | Round barrow | Camrose | 51.8547°N 5.0258°W, SM917216 | | Prehistoric | PE524 |
| | Castell Felin-Ganol | Promontory fort – inland | Cilgerran | 52.0482°N 4.679°W, SN163422 | | Prehistoric | PE170 |
| | Cwmbettws Defended Enclosure | Enclosure (archaeology) – Defensive | Cilgerran | 52.0294°N 4.67°W, SN169401 | | Prehistoric | PE564 |
| | Penralltddu Defended Enclosure | Promontory fort – inland | Cilgerran | 52.051°N 4.6675°W, SN171425 | | Prehistoric | PE535 |
| Bedd Morris standing stone, before the 2011 damage | Bedd Morris Standing Stone | Standing stone | Cwm Gwaun | 51.9922°N 4.8588°W, SN038365 | Damage in 2011 (presumed vehicle collision), occasioned an excavation of the socket. Hammer stones, flaked stone and charcoal confirmed it had stood here since the Bronze Age. It was utilised as a marker for Newport borough boundary. In 2012 it was repaired and replaced in its original location. | Bronze Age | PE361 |
| | Castell Pengegin | Promontory fort – inland | Cwm Gwaun | 51.9734°N 4.8564°W, SN039344 | | Prehistoric | PE201 |
| Cerrig Lladron standing stone | Cerrig Lladron stone row | Stone Row | Cwm Gwaun | 51.9553°N 4.8152°W, SN066322 | Three standing stones (one now fallen) align with the nearby Foel Eryr hilltop cairn. | Bronze Age | PE496 |
| | Cronllwyn Earthwork | Enclosure | Cwm Gwaun | 51.9797°N 4.9335°W, SM986353 | | Prehistoric | PE349 |
| | Enclosure Site 80m N of Ty Mawr | Enclosure | Cwm Gwaun | 51.9703°N 4.8688°W, SN030340 | | Prehistoric | PE487 |
| | Enclosure Site on Allt Pen-Gegin-Isaf | Enclosure | Cwm Gwaun | 51.9698°N 4.8672°W, SN031340 | | Prehistoric | PE486 |
| Summit cairn on Foel Eryr | Foel Eryr Round Cairn | Round cairn | Cwm Gwaun | 51.9535°N 4.8161°W, SN065320 | | Bronze Age | PE298 |
| | Gellifawr, Standing Stone 70m SW of | Standing stone | Cwm Gwaun | 51.9746°N 4.8236°W, SN061344 | | Prehistoric | PE502 |
| | Glyn Gath Round Barrow | Ring cairn | Cwm Gwaun | 51.9926°N 4.8901°W, SN017366 | | Prehistoric | PE312 |
| | Huts on Mynydd Melyn | Unenclosed hut circle | Cwm Gwaun | 51.9899°N 4.8733°W, SN028362 | | Prehistoric | PE360 |
| | Iron Age Enclosure in Kilkiffeth Wood | Enclosure | Cwm Gwaun | 51.9705°N 4.8877°W, SN017341 | | Prehistoric | PE407 |
| | Mynydd Cilciffeth Round Barrows | Round barrow | Cwm Gwaun | 51.9545°N 4.898°W, SN009324 | | Prehistoric | PE293 |
| Parc y Meirw megalithic alignment | Parc-y-Meirw Standing Stones | Stone Row | Cwm Gwaun | 51.9856°N 4.916°W, SM998359 | A row of four large standing stones, plus at least two others now lying down. There may be an additional alignment with Trellwyn Fawr stone (PE505) | Bronze Age | PE126 |
| | Tre-Gynon Camp | Promontory fort – inland | Cwm Gwaun | 51.975°N 4.8368°W, SN052345 | | Prehistoric | PE308 |
| Trellwyn-fach maenhir | Trellwyn Fach, Standing Stone 100m NW of | Standing stone | Cwm Gwaun | 51.9831°N 4.9033°W, SN007356 | Also called Parc Maenhir. A 2m tall standing stone. | Bronze Age | PE506 |
| | Trellwyn Fawr, Standing Stone 60m WSW of | Standing stone | Cwm Gwaun | 51.9847°N 4.9119°W, SN001358 | Early descriptions claim a pair of standing stones of which one now remains. 1.4m high, it is close to, and almost in line with the stone row of Parc-y-Meirw (PE126) | Bronze Age | PE505 |
| | Dale Point Promontory Fort (Defences) | Promontory fort – coastal | Dale | 51.7031°N 5.1534°W, SM821052 | | Prehistoric | PE322 |
| | Great Castle Head Rath | Promontory fort – coastal | Dale | 51.7066°N 5.1865°W, SM799056 | | Prehistoric | PE195 |
| | Little Castle Point Defended Enclosure | Promontory fort – coastal | Dale | 51.6905°N 5.1872°W, SM798038 | | Prehistoric | PE536 |
| | Dinas Island Castell | Promontory fort – inland | Dinas Cross | 52.0245°N 4.8969°W, SN013401 | | Prehistoric | PE543 |
| Standing Stone leaning at Dinas Cross – geograph.org.uk – 1803573 | Parc Cerric Hirion | Standing stone | Dinas Cross | 52.0113°N 4.9038°W, SN008387 | 2.1m tall standing stone, with quite an acute lean. Confusion with the nearby stone at Ty-meini (PE200) has resulted in this stone sometimes also being named as The Lady Stone. | Bronze Age | PE199 |
| The Lady Stone near Dinas Cross | The Lady Stone, Ty-Meini | Standing stone | Dinas Cross | 52.0008°N 4.9212°W, SM996376 | Tall, tapering 2.7m standing stone beside a road near Dinas Cross. The rounded form of the top is said to resemble a heavily veiled lady. | Prehistoric | PE200 |
| | Banc Llwydlos Hut Group | Enclosed hut circle | Eglwyswrw | 51.9635°N 4.7772°W, SN093331 | | Prehistoric | PE370 |
| Bedd Arthur stone oval, Preseli Mountains | Bedd Arthur | Enclosure | Eglwyswrw | 51.9597°N 4.7223°W, SN130325 | Stones set within an oval banked enclosure, 18m across at its longest. Possibly a ritual site, very like one on Skomer Island. Possible parallels with the earliest form of Stonehenge | Neolithic | PE464 |
| Bedd yr Afanc, looking east-southeast | Bedd yr Afanc Burial Chamber | Chambered tomb | Eglwyswrw | 51.9775°N 4.7563°W, SN108346 | Passage grave within a long cairn with 15m long mound. Some 7 surviving boulders create a P-shaped burial chamber. Excavated in 1939. | Neolithic | PE122 |
| | Carn Alw Hillfort | Hillfort | Eglwyswrw | 51.9707°N 4.7112°W, SN138337 | | Prehistoric | PE375 |
| | Castell Llwyd | Promontory fort – inland | Eglwyswrw | 52.0049°N 4.751°W, SN113376 | | Prehistoric | PE174 |
| Castell Mawr from the air | Castell Mawr | Hillfort | Eglwyswrw | 52.0064°N 4.7424°W, SN119378 | | Prehistoric | PE172 |
| | Cwm-Pen-y-Benglog Camp | Promontory fort – inland | Eglwyswrw | 52.0021°N 4.7421°W, SN118372 | | Prehistoric | PE173 |
| | Foel Eryr Hut Group | Enclosed hut circle | Eglwyswrw | 51.9522°N 4.8111°W, SN069319 | | Prehistoric | PE368 |
| | Foel Feddau Round Cairn | Round cairn | Eglwyswrw | 51.9573°N 4.7633°W, SN102323 | | Prehistoric | PE301 |
| | Parc-Lan Standing Stones | Standing stone | Eglwyswrw | 51.9872°N 4.7826°W, SN090357 | | Prehistoric | PE371 |
| | Penparke Standing Stone | Standing stone | Eglwyswrw | 51.9845°N 4.7823°W, SN090354 | | Prehistoric | PE372 |
| | Tafarn-y-Bwlch Standing Stones | Standing stone | Eglwyswrw | 51.9685°N 4.7945°W, SN081337 | | Prehistoric | PE352 |
| | Waun Mawn Standing Stones | Standing stone | Eglwyswrw | 51.9716°N 4.7912°W, SN083340 | | Prehistoric | PE124 |
| Garn Wen Cromlechs | Garn Wen Burial Chambers | Chambered tomb | Fishguard and Goodwick | 52.0117°N 4.9909°W, SM948390 | A line of at least three, maybe four, cromlechs almost disappearing in the brambles and bracken on the hillside above Fishguard Ferry Terminal. | Prehistoric | PE030 |
| Pen Rhiw Cromlech | Pen-Rhiw Burial Chamber | Chambered tomb | Fishguard and Goodwick | 52.0119°N 4.9999°W, SM942390 | A broad, low lying cromlech in a grassy field north of Pen-rhiw farm | Prehistoric | PE033 |
| | Clyn-Ffwrn Burial Chamber | Chambered tomb | Hayscastle | 51.9188°N 5.0581°W, SM898289 | | Prehistoric | PE132 |
| | Rhyndaston-Fawr Standing Stone | Standing stone | Hayscastle | 51.8777°N 5.0583°W, SM896243 | | Prehistoric | PE266 |
| | Round Barrow 370m NW of Mockwell | Round barrow | Hayscastle | 51.888°N 5.0245°W, SM919253 | | Prehistoric | PE520 |
| | St Lawrence Camp | Promontory fort – inland | Hayscastle | 51.9096°N 5.0077°W, SM932277 | | Prehistoric | PE296 |
| | Standing Stone 100m ENE of Blaen-llyn | Standing stone | Hayscastle | 51.922°N 5.0861°W, SM878293 | | Prehistoric | PE507 |
| | Standing Stone 200m ENE of Trehale House | Standing stone | Hayscastle | 51.92°N 5.0765°W, SM885290 | | Prehistoric | PE509 |
| | Standing Stone 270m NW of Trehale House | Standing stone | Hayscastle | 51.921°N 5.0821°W, SM881292 | | Prehistoric | PE508 |
| | Tre-Howell Burial Chamber | Chambered tomb | Hayscastle | 51.9178°N 5.0674°W, SM891288 | | Neolithic | PE063 |
| | Tump Round Barrow | Round barrow | Hayscastle | 51.8808°N 5.0491°W, SM902246 | | Prehistoric | PE022 |
| | South Hook Camp | Promontory fort – coastal | Herbrandston | 51.7146°N 5.0903°W, SM866062 | | Prehistoric | PE307 |
| | Pen-Dre Round Barrow | Round barrow | Letterston | 51.9285°N 4.9869°W, SM947297 | | Prehistoric | PE062 |
| | Round Barrow 300m NW of Tallyho | Round barrow | Llangwm | 51.7514°N 4.9519°W, SM963099 | | Prehistoric | PE526 |
| | Bickny Round Barrow | Round barrow | Llanrhian | 51.9394°N 5.1564°W, SM831314 | | Prehistoric | PE260 |
| | Castell Coch Promontory Fort | Promontory fort – inland | Llanrhian | 51.9607°N 5.145°W, SM840338 | | Prehistoric | PE029 |
| | Lecha Burial Chamber | Chambered tomb | Llanrhian | 51.8996°N 5.1824°W, SM811271 | | Prehistoric | PE028 |
| | Porth Egr Defended Enclosure | Promontory fort – coastal | Llanrhian | 51.9452°N 5.2024°W, SM800322 | | Prehistoric | PE549 |
| | White House Burial Chamber | Chambered tomb | Llanrhian | 51.9115°N 5.1625°W, SM825284 | | Neolithic | PE159 |
| | Castle Head Defended Enclosure | Promontory fort – coastal | Marloes and St Brides | 51.7559°N 5.1923°W, SM797111 | | Prehistoric | PE537 |
| | Deer Park Promontory Fort | Promontory fort – coastal | Marloes and St Brides | 51.7355°N 5.2484°W, SM758090 | | Prehistoric | PE323 |
| | Tower Point Rath | Promontory fort – inland | Marloes and St Brides | 51.7523°N 5.203°W, SM790108 | | Prehistoric | PE281 |
| | Watery Bay Rath | Promontory fort – coastal | Marloes and St Brides | 51.7259°N 5.2319°W, SM768079 | | Prehistoric | PE194 |
| Carreg Samson Dolmen | Carreg Samson Dolmen | Dolmen | Mathry | 51.9583°N 5.1329°W, SM848335 | Spectacular dolmen with huge capstone supported by three of the surrounding 6 uprights. Traditionally classed as a stone tomb, recent research is suggesting there was never a mound. Excavation in 1968 revealed it stands directly over an infilled pit large enough to have been the source of the capstone. (Often also spelled 'Sampson') | Prehistoric neolithic | PE036 |
| Castell Coch, Penmorfa | Castell Coch Promontory Fort (on Penmorfa) | Promontory fort – coastal | Mathry | 51.9702°N 5.0989°W, SM872347 | | Prehistoric | PE393 |
| | Pen-Lan-Mebws-Uchaf Burial Chamber | Chambered tomb | Mathry | 51.9279°N 5.0646°W, SM893299 | | Neolithic | PE131 |
| | Standing Stone 400m NE of Pen-lan-Mabws | Standing stone | Mathry | 51.9289°N 5.0777°W, SM884300 | | Prehistoric | PE510 |
| | Tre-Wallter Llwyd Burial Chamber | Chambered tomb | Mathry | 51.9434°N 5.103°W, SM868317 | | Prehistoric | PE037 |
| | Ty-Newydd-Grug Standing Stone | Standing stone | Mathry | 51.9181°N 5.0191°W, SM924286 | | Prehistoric | PE297 |
| | Ynys y Castell | Hillfort | Mathry | 51.9621°N 5.129°W, SM851339 | | Prehistoric | PE038 |
| | Castle Pill | Enclosure (archaeology) – Defensive | Milford Haven | 51.7178°N 5.0145°W, SM918064 | | Prehistoric | PE541 |
| | Long Stone Burial Chamber | Burial Chamber | Milford Haven | 51.7235°N 5.0534°W, SM892071 | | Prehistoric | PE135 |
| | Priory Rath | Rath | Milford Haven | 51.7233°N 5.0343°W, SM905070 | | Prehistoric | PE186 |
| | Castell Henllys | Hillfort | Nevern | 52.0176°N 4.7463°W, SN167390 | | Prehistoric | PE175 |
| | Caer, Bayvil | Enclosure | Nevern | 52.0416°N 4.7536°W, SN112417 | | Prehistoric | PE419 |
| | Caerau | Enclosure | Nevern | 52.0756°N 4.7386°W, SN124454 | | Prehistoric | PE211 |
| | Castell Tre-Riffith | Promontory fort – coastal | Nevern | 52.0697°N 4.7727°W, SN100449 | | Prehistoric | PE214 |
| | Castell y Garn Defended Enclosure | Enclosure (archaeology) – Defensive | Nevern | 52.0488°N 4.8044°W, SN078426 | | Prehistoric | PE552 |
| | Crugiau Cemmaes Round Barrows | Round barrow | Nevern | 52.0411°N 4.7348°W, SN125416 | | Prehistoric | PE197 |
| | Cup-Marked Stone 350m E of Tre-Fael | Cup-marked stone | Nevern | 52.0284°N 4.767°W, SN102402 | | Prehistoric | PE313 |
| | Cwm Gloyn Camp | Promontory fort – inland | Nevern | 52.023°N 4.7654°W, SN103397 | | Prehistoric | PE306 |
| | Enclosure in Tycanol Wood | Promontory fort – coastal | Nevern | 51.9964°N 4.7822°W, SN091367 | | Prehistoric | PE481 |
| | Glan-Dwr-Isaf Camp | Enclosure | Nevern | 52.0692°N 4.7361°W, SN125447 | | Prehistoric | PE213 |
| | Llech-y-Tribedd Burial Chamber | Chambered tomb | Nevern | 52.0545°N 4.7717°W, SN100432 | Well preserved dolmen with three tapering uprights and a massive capstone | Prehistoric | PE049 |
| | Pant-y-Groes Round Barrow | Round barrow | Nevern | 52.0457°N 4.7595°W, SN108421 | | Prehistoric | PE198 |
| | Pen-Castell Promontory Fort | Promontory fort – coastal | Nevern | 52.0795°N 4.7589°W, SN110459 | | Prehistoric | PE212 |
| | Penrallt yr Esgob Cairn | Round cairn | Nevern | 52.0699°N 4.7441°W, SN120448 | | Prehistoric | PE386 |
| | Pentre Ifan, Standing Stone 120m SSW of | Standing stone | Nevern | 51.9979°N 4.7705°W, SN099369 | | Prehistoric | PE504 |
| Pentre Ifan Dolman | Pentre Ifan Dolmen | Dolman | Nevern | 51.9991°N 4.7701°W, SN099370 | 16 tonne capstone, supported 2.5m off the ground on the slender tips of three upright stones. One of the most famous images of the Celtic fringe, and given legal protection in 1882. Traditionally considered a stone chamber for a tomb burial, recent research is suggesting it was designed to show off the elevated capstone, and was never within a mound. | Prehistoric (Neolithic) | PE008 |
| | Tre-Fach Camp | Promontory fort – inland | Nevern | 52.0325°N 4.7905°W, SN086408 | | Prehistoric | PE353 |
| | Tre-Fach Standing Stone | Standing stone | Nevern | 51.9801°N 4.8204°W, SN064350 | | Prehistoric | PE202 |
| | Trefaes Ganol, Standing Stone 250m N of | Standing stone | Nevern | 52.0529°N 4.7481°W, SN116429 | | Prehistoric | PE501 |
| Trellyffant Dolman | Trellyffaint Burial Chamber & Standing Stone | Chambered tomb | Nevern | 52.0478°N 4.7982°W, SN082425 | A very large capstone is supported by four uprights of which at least one has slumped | Prehistoric | PE041 |
| | Carn Briw Round Cairn | Round cairn | Newport | 51.998°N 4.8327°W, SN056370 | | Prehistoric | PE544 |
| | Carn Ffoi Camp | Hillfort | Newport | 52.0055°N 4.8447°W, SN048379 | | Prehistoric | PE051 |
| | Carn Ffoi Prehistoric Settlement | Hut circle settlement | Newport | 52.0041°N 4.8469°W, SN046377 | | Prehistoric | PE052 |
| | Carn Ingli Camp | Hillfort | Newport | 52°N 4.8227°W, SN063372 | | Prehistoric | PE011 |
| | Carn Ingli Common Hut Circles | Unenclosed hut circle | Newport | 51.9962°N 4.8349°W, SN054368 | | Prehistoric | PE309 |
| | Carn Ingli Round Barrows | Round barrow | Newport | 52.0069°N 4.8213°W, SN064380 | | Prehistoric | PE019 |
| | Carn Llwyd ring cairn | Ring cairn | Newport | 52.0058°N 4.8237°W, SN062379 | | Prehistoric | PE495 |
| Carreg Coetan burial chamber | Carreg Coetan Arthur Burial Chamber | Chambered tomb | Newport | 52.0186°N 4.8282°W, SN060394 | Excavated by Sian Rees in 1979–80. Large well preserved dolmen amongst houses in Newport. | Neolithic | PE056 |
| Cerrig y Gof chambered tomb | Cerig-y-Gof Burial Chamber | Chambered tomb | Newport | 52.0137°N 4.8627°W, SN036389 | A group of up to five stone-lined chambers, thought to have been under a single mound, each with its own entrance portal. One retains a large capstone. | Neolithic | PE050 |
| | Hendre, Standing Stone 450m NNW of | Standing stone | Newport | 52.017°N 4.8582°W, SN039392 | | Prehistoric | PE503 |
| | Mynnydd Caregog Hut Circle | Unenclosed hut circle | Newport | 51.9925°N 4.8537°W, SN041365 | | Prehistoric | PE310 |
| | Slade Camp | Promontory fort – inland | Nolton and Roch | 51.8627°N 5.0633°W, SM891226 | | Prehistoric | PE271 |
| | Carn Wnda Burial Chamber | Chambered tomb | Pencaer | 52.0129°N 5.0133°W, SM933392 | | Neolithic | PE031 |
| | Carreg Golchfa Defended Enclosure | Promontory fort – coastal | Pencaer | 51.9747°N 5.084°W, SM882351 | | Prehistoric | PE542 |
| | Castell Cleddyf | Enclosure | Pencaer | 52.0174°N 5.0326°W, SM920397 | | Prehistoric | PE350 |
| | Castell Poeth | Enclosure | Pencaer | 51.998°N 5.0647°W, SM897377 | | Prehistoric | PE080 |
| Dinas Mawr promontary fort | Dinas Mawr Camp | Promontory fort – coastal | Pencaer | 52.0064°N 5.0782°W, SM888386 | | Prehistoric | PE075 |
| | Ffynnon- Druidion Standing Stone | Standing stone | Pencaer | 51.9877°N 5.0288°W, SM921365 | | Prehistoric | PE259 |
| | Garn Fawr Camp | Hillfort | Pencaer | 52.008°N 5.0676°W, SM895388 | | Prehistoric | PE065 |
| | Garn Fechan Camp | Hillfort | Pencaer | 52.009°N 5.0605°W, SM900389 | | Prehistoric | PE471 |
| | Garn Gilfach Burial Chamber | Chambered tomb | Pencaer | 52.0098°N 5.0484°W, SM909389 | | Neolithic | PE032 |
| | Parc Hen Standing Stone | Standing stone | Pencaer | 52.0109°N 5.0137°W, SM932390 | | Prehistoric | PE518 |
| | Rhos y Clegyrn Circle & Standing Stone | Standing stone | Pencaer | 51.9783°N 5.0397°W, SM913354 | | Prehistoric | PE045 |
| Ffyst Samson dolmen | Trefflys Burial Chamber | Chambered tomb | Pencaer | 51.9732°N 5.0501°W, SM906349 | Also known as Ffyst Samson. This dolmen has two substantial uprights, 2 metres apart, supporting a large capstonewhich slopes down to the north. | Neolithic | PE044 |
| Banc Du hillside | Banc Du Neolithic Enclosure | Enclosure | Puncheston | 51.9409°N 4.823°W, SN060306 | The first confirmed neolithic enclosure in Wales. Excavations in 2012 revealed ramparts built with stone facing and timber posts. Dated to 3650 BC. | Neolithic | PE532 |
| | Carreg Quoitan Standing Stone | Standing stone | Puncheston | 51.9351°N 4.8969°W, SN009302 | Also called Carreg Coitan Arthur. It is an irregular, massive monolith, over 2m high, set into an embanked hedge line a little north of the village. | Bronze Age | PE513 |
| | Castell y Fuwch | Enclosure | Puncheston | 51.9255°N 4.8744°W, SN024291 | | Prehistoric | PE239 |
| | Colston Burial Chamber | Chambered tomb | Puncheston | 51.915°N 4.9343°W, SM983281 | Also known as 'The Altar'. A stone chamber with a capstone embedded into a field boundary bank. An adjacent second chamber on the other side of the boundary was destroyed c.1815 when Beulah Hill road was built over it. | Neolithic | PE025 |
| | Defended Enclosure 300m SE of Pentre | Enclosure (archaeology) – Defensive | Puncheston | 51.93°N 4.9413°W, SM978298 | | Prehistoric | PE550 |
| | Defended Enclosure 400m ESE of Pen-Feidr | Enclosure (archaeology) – Defensive | Puncheston | 51.9207°N 4.8404°W, SN047284 | | Prehistoric | PE557 |
| | Dyffryn Stone Circle | Stone circle | Puncheston | 51.9207°N 4.8236°W, SN059284 | | Prehistoric | PE120 |
| | Fagwr-Fran Standing Stone | Standing stone | Puncheston | 51.9458°N 4.9043°W, SN005315 | | Prehistoric | PE340 |
| | Huts, Enclosures & Field Systems, Bernards Well Mountain | Hut circle settlement | Puncheston | 51.9274°N 4.8285°W, SN056292 | | Prehistoric | PE399 |
| | Iron Age/ Romano-British Settlement & Field Systems on Fagwr-Fran Moor | Hut circle settlement | Puncheston | 51.9523°N 4.9104°W, SN001322 | | Prehistoric | PE417 |
| | Marsh Round Barrow | Round barrow | Puncheston | 51.9408°N 4.9022°W, SN006309 | | Prehistoric | PE341 |
| | Mynydd Castlebythe Ring Barrow | Ring barrow | Puncheston | 51.9302°N 4.8701°W, SN027296 | | Prehistoric | PE517 |
| | Mynydd Castlebythe Round Barrows | Round barrow | Puncheston | 51.9304°N 4.8686°W, SN028296 | | Prehistoric | PE516 |
| | Parc Castell Round Barrow | Round barrow | Puncheston | 51.9084°N 4.879°W, SN020272 | | Prehistoric | PE515 |
| | Parc Maen Llwyd Standing Stone | Standing stone | Puncheston | 51.9308°N 4.9015°W, SN006297 | | Prehistoric | PE514 |
| | Summerton Camp | Hillfort | Puncheston | 51.9338°N 4.9248°W, SM990302 | | Prehistoric | PE299 |
| | Wern Camp | Promontory fort – inland | Puncheston | 51.9349°N 4.8844°W, SN018301 | | Prehistoric | PE237 |
| | Rosemarket Rath | Rath | Rosemarket | 51.7336°N 4.9658°W, SM952080 | | Prehistoric | PE223 |
| | Leachpool Round Barrow | Round barrow | Rudbaxton | 51.8334°N 4.9434°W, SM973190 | | Prehistoric | PE356 |
| | Pit Circle 250m NE of Cottesmore Farm | Pit circle | Rudbaxton | 51.8304°N 4.9768°W, SM950188 | | Prehistoric | PE462 |
| | Round Barrow Pair 175m N of Ramswood House | Round barrow | Rudbaxton | 51.8502°N 4.9242°W, SM986208 | | Prehistoric | PE114 |
| The Rath, Rudbaxton | Rudbaxton Rath | Rath | Rudbaxton | 51.8319°N 4.9254°W, SM985189 | | Prehistoric | PE101 |
| | Castell Hendre-Wen | Enclosure | Scleddau | 51.9628°N 5.0278°W, SM921337 | | Prehistoric | PE081 |
| | Round Barrow on Jordanson Hill | Round barrow | Scleddau | 51.9579°N 5.0258°W, SM922331 | | Prehistoric | PE082 |
| | Castle Lake Camp | Promontory fort – coastal | Slebech | 51.78°N 4.8694°W, SN021129 | | Prehistoric | PE278 |
| | Picton Point Camp | Promontory fort – coastal | Slebech | 51.7686°N 4.8957°W, SN003117 | | Prehistoric | PE280 |
| | Burial Chamber | Chambered tomb | Solva | 51.871°N 5.1797°W, SM812239 | | Neolithic | PE043 |
| | Enclosure 200m SE of Solva Village | Enclosure | Solva | 51.8745°N 5.185°W, SM809243 | | Prehistoric | PE480 |
| | Porth y Bwch Defended Enclosure | Promontory fort – coastal | Solva | 51.8658°N 5.1793°W, SM812233 | | Prehistoric | PE548 |
| Porth y Rhaw hillfort from the west | Porth-y-Rhaw Camp | Promontory fort – coastal | Solva | 51.8725°N 5.2164°W, SM786242 | | Prehistoric | PE273 |
| | Promontory Fort S of Solva Harbour | Promontory fort – coastal | Solva | 51.8703°N 5.194°W, SM802239 | | Prehistoric | PE410 |
| | Tre-Maen Hir Standing Stones | Standing stone | Solva | 51.8931°N 5.1592°W, SM827263 | | Prehistoric | PE130 |
| | Carn Llidi Burial Chambers | Chambered tomb | St Davids and the Cathedral Close | 51.9035°N 5.2935°W, SM735279 | | Neolithic | PE042 |
| Coetan Arthur Burial Chamber, St David's Head | Coetan Arthur Burial Chamber | Chambered tomb | St Davids and the Cathedral Close | 51.9045°N 5.3081°W, SM725281 | | Neolithic | PE054 |
| | Lower Tregennis Burial Chamber | Chambered tomb | St Davids and the Cathedral Close | 51.8641°N 5.3159°W, SM717235 | | Neolithic | PE421 |
| | Standing Stone NW of Trecenny Farm | Standing stone | St Davids and the Cathedral Close | 51.8855°N 5.2468°W, SM766257 | | Prehistoric | PE414 |
| | Caerau Promontory Forts | Promontory fort – coastal | St Davids and the Cathedral Close | 51.9314°N 5.2178°W, SM788307 | | Prehistoric | PE392 |
| Caerfaihillfort on Penpleidiau | Caerfai Camp | Promontory fort – coastal | St Davids and the Cathedral Close | 51.8696°N 5.251°W, SM762240 | | Prehistoric | PE294 |
| | Castell Coch Promontory Fort (by Ynys Gwair) | Promontory fort – coastal | St Davids and the Cathedral Close | 51.9272°N 5.2368°W, SM775303 | | Prehistoric | PE391 |
| | Castell Heinif | Promontory fort – coastal | St Davids and the Cathedral Close | 51.8742°N 5.3082°W, SM723246 | | Prehistoric | PE295 |
| Clegyr Boia, view east | Clegyr Boia Camp | Hillfort | St Davids and the Cathedral Close | 51.8785°N 5.2885°W, SM737251 | | Prehistoric | PE109 |
| | Hut Circles and Ancient Enclosures NW of Carn Llidi | Field system | St Davids and the Cathedral Close | 51.9068°N 5.299°W, SM731282 | | Prehistoric | PE093 |
| | St David's Head Camp | Promontory fort – coastal | St Davids and the Cathedral Close | 51.903°N 5.312°W, SM722279 | | Prehistoric | PE071 |
| | Burnt Mound 120m SSE of Cippin Fach | Burnt mound | St Dogmaels | 52.0988°N 4.7283°W, SN132480 | | Prehistoric | PE477 |
| | Burnt Mound 160m SW of Wern-Ddu | Burnt mound | St Dogmaels | 52.0988°N 4.7226°W, SN135478 | | Prehistoric | PE478 |
| | Foxhill Round Barrow | Round barrow | St Dogmaels | 52.0756°N 4.6989°W, SN151453 | | Prehistoric | PE326 |
| | Pant-y-Groes Crugiau | Round barrow | St Dogmaels | 52.0788°N 4.713°W, SN141457 | | Prehistoric | PE168 |
| | Burnt Mound 320m S of Winsle Leys | Burnt mound | St Ishmael's | 51.7342°N 5.1279°W, SM841085 | | Prehistoric | PE474 |
| | Promontory Fort on Great Castle Head | Promontory fort – coastal | St Ishmael's | 51.7116°N 5.116°W, SM848060 | | Prehistoric | PE416 |
| | Promontory Fort on Little Castle Head | Promontory fort – coastal | St Ishmael's | 51.7161°N 5.1071°W, SM854065 | | Prehistoric | PE408 |
| | Standing Stone 290m S of Mabesgate | Standing stone | St Ishmael's | 51.725°N 5.1461°W, SM828076 | | Prehistoric | PE113 |
| | Standing Stone NNW of Sandy Haven House | Standing stone | St Ishmael's | 51.7332°N 5.1167°W, SM848084 | | Prehistoric | PE358 |
| | Black Point Rath | Promontory fort – coastal | The Havens | 51.7952°N 5.105°W, SM860152 | | Prehistoric | PE265 |
| | Harold Stone | Standing stone | The Havens | 51.7901°N 5.1022°W, SM861147 | | Prehistoric | PE362 |
| | Howelston Defended Enclosure | Promontory fort – inland | The Havens | 51.7655°N 5.1135°W, SM852120 | | Prehistoric | PE538 |
| | Howney Stone Rath | Promontory fort – inland | The Havens | 51.7711°N 5.1609°W, SM820127 | | Prehistoric | PE282 |
| | Lamber Round Barrow | Round barrow | The Havens | 51.7924°N 5.0547°W, SM894148 | | Prehistoric | PE348 |
| | Little Haven Enclosed Settlement | Unenclosed hut circle settlement | The Havens | 51.7689°N 5.1131°W, SM852123 | | Prehistoric | PE456 |
| | Mill Haven Rath | Promontory fort – inland | The Havens | 51.7682°N 5.1653°W, SM816125 | | Prehistoric | PE283 |
| | Standing Stones near Upper Lodge | Standing stone | The Havens | 51.7863°N 5.1017°W, SM861143 | | Prehistoric | PE134 |
| | Woodland Rath | Rath | The Havens | 51.7637°N 5.1108°W, SM854118 | | Prehistoric | PE191 |
| | Woodland Round Barrow | Round barrow | The Havens | 51.7631°N 5.1039°W, SM859117 | | Prehistoric | PE158 |
| | Burnt Mound 170m S of Jubilee Cottages | Burnt mound | Tiers Cross | 51.7523°N 5.0124°W, SM921102 | | Prehistoric | PE476 |
| | Burnt Mound 240m NE of Highway Park | Burnt mound | Tiers Cross | 51.7616°N 5.0322°W, SM908113 | | Prehistoric | PE473 |
| | Denant Rath | Rath | Tiers Cross | 51.7775°N 5.0132°W, SM922131 | | Prehistoric | PE215 |
| | Thornton Rath | Promontory fort – inland | Tiers Cross | 51.7305°N 5.0351°W, SM905078 | | Prehistoric | PE187 |
| | Waun-Castell Camp | Promontory fort – inland | Trecwn | 51.952°N 4.9534°W, SM971322 | | Prehistoric | PE140 |
| | Bucket Camp | Enclosure | Trecwn | 51.94°N 4.9838°W, SM950310 | | Prehistoric | PE231 |
| | Caer Penbicas | Enclosure | Trecwn | 51.955°N 4.9715°W, SM959327 | | Prehistoric | PE139 |
| | Castell Cwm-Wyntyll | Enclosure | Trecwn | 51.9415°N 4.9627°W, SM964311 | | Prehistoric | PE141 |
| | Castell Pant-y-Phillip | Enclosure | Trecwn | 51.9625°N 4.9806°W, SM952335 | | Prehistoric | PE138 |
| | Good Hook Round Barrow | Round barrow | Uzmaston and Boulston | 51.811°N 4.9213°W, SM987166 | | Prehistoric | PE330 |
| | Hanton Round Barrows | Round barrow | Uzmaston and Boulston | 51.7924°N 4.9248°W, SM983144 | | Prehistoric | PE279 |
| | Uzmaston Round Barrow | Round barrow | Uzmaston and Boulston | 51.7946°N 4.9453°W, SM970148 | | Prehistoric | PE331 |
| | Burnt Mound 160m E of Woodsend | Burnt mound | Walwyn's Castle | 51.7514°N 5.0744°W, SM878103 | | Prehistoric | PE475 |
| | Capeston Rath | Promontory fort – inland | Walwyn's Castle | 51.7435°N 5.0901°W, SM867095 | | Prehistoric | PE193 |
| Rath (Ringwork) at Walwyn's Castle | Rath S of St James Church | Rath | Walwyn's Castle | 51.7579°N 5.0838°W, SM872110 | | Prehistoric | PE189 |
| | Rickeston Rath | Rath | Walwyn's Castle | 51.7435°N 5.0856°W, SM870095 | | Prehistoric | PE192 |
| | Roman Castle | Rath | Walwyn's Castle | 51.7543°N 5.051°W, SM895105 | | Prehistoric | PE188 |
| | Syke Rath | Promontory fort – inland | Walwyn's Castle | 51.7509°N 5.084°W, SM872103 | | Prehistoric | PE190 |
| | Colby Moor Round Barrow | Round barrow | Wiston | 51.8205°N 4.8424°W, SN041173 | | Prehistoric | PE527 |
| | Corner Piece Round Barrow | Round barrow | Wiston | 51.8451°N 4.8704°W, SN023201 | | Prehistoric | PE528 |
| | Knock Rath | Rath | Wiston | 51.8593°N 4.8498°W, SN039217 | | Prehistoric | PE242 |
| | Lamborough Camp | Promontory fort – inland | Wiston | 51.8421°N 4.8639°W, SN028198 | | Prehistoric | PE267 |
| | Scollock Rath | Rath | Wiston | 51.8817°N 4.8797°W, SN019242 | | Prehistoric | PE244 |
| | Walton Mill Rath | Enclosure | Wiston | 51.8716°N 4.8588°W, SN032231 | | Prehistoric | PE460 |
| | Woodbarn Camp | Rath | Wiston | 51.8166°N 4.8785°W, SN017170 | | Prehistoric | PE089 |
| | Ford Camp | Enclosure | Wolfscastle | 51.8993°N 4.9834°W, SM948265 | | Prehistoric | PE256 |
| | Garn Turne Burial Chamber | Chambered tomb | Wolfscastle | 51.9072°N 4.9389°W, SM979272 | | Neolithic | PE061 |
| | Great Treffgarne Rocks Camp | Hillfort | Wolfscastle | 51.8867°N 4.9705°W, SM956250 | | Prehistoric | PE248 |
| | Great Treffgarne Wood Camp | Enclosure | Wolfscastle | 51.8712°N 4.9648°W, SM960233 | | Prehistoric | PE247 |
| | Hazel Grove Camp (North) | Enclosure | Wolfscastle | 51.8735°N 4.9594°W, SM964236 | | Prehistoric | PE251 |
| | Hazel Grove Camp (South) | Enclosure | Wolfscastle | 51.8726°N 4.9582°W, SM965234 | | Prehistoric | PE252 |
| | Little Treffgarne Camp | Enclosure | Wolfscastle | 51.8847°N 4.9644°W, SM961248 | | Prehistoric | PE249 |
| | Little Treffgarne Wood Camp | Enclosure | Wolfscastle | 51.8817°N 4.9641°W, SM960245 | | Prehistoric | PE250 |
| | Lower Broad Moor Standing Stone | Standing stone | Wolfscastle | 51.9097°N 4.9787°W, SM952276 | | Prehistoric | PE355 |
| | Nant y Coy Bridge Defended Enclosure | Enclosure (archaeology) – Defensive | Wolfscastle | 51.8882°N 4.974°W, SM954252 | | Prehistoric | PE556 |
| | Sealyham Quarries Camp | Promontory fort – inland | Wolfscastle | 51.9086°N 4.9684°W, SM959275 | | Prehistoric | PE255 |
| | Sealyham Rocks Camp | Rath | Wolfscastle | 51.9163°N 4.9543°W, SM969283 | | Prehistoric | PE253 |
| | Standing Stone 450m SSE of Lower Broadmoor Farm | Standing stone | Wolfscastle | 51.9075°N 4.9776°W, SM952274 | | Prehistoric | PE512 |
| | Treffgarne Gorge Defended Enclosure | Enclosure (archaeology) – Defensive | Wolfscastle | 51.8799°N 4.9644°W, SM960243 | | Prehistoric | PE555 |
| | West Ford Camp | Enclosure | Wolfscastle | 51.8911°N 4.9842°W, SM947256 | | Prehistoric | PE257 |

Scheduled Monuments in Pembrokeshire, Wales.
=Prehistoric monument site

== See also ==
- List of Cadw properties
- List of castles in Wales
- List of hill forts in Wales
- Historic houses in Wales
- List of monastic houses in Wales
- List of museums in Wales
- List of Roman villas in Wales
