= Richard Rice Thomas =

Anglican archdeacon (1937–1942)

Richard Rice Thomas was the Archdeacon of St Davids from 1937 until his death on 17 May 1942.

Thomas was educated at Keble College, Oxford, and Cuddesdon College. He was ordained Deacon in 1896; and Priest in 1897. He was a Chaplain to the Forces from 1917 to 1918, and Curate of Wantage until 1908; Vicar of Haroldston West with Lambston from 1908 to 1923; Vicar of Llanstadwell from 1923 to 1941; and Vicar of Lamphey with Hodgeston from 1941 until his death.
