= Middleholm =

Island in Pembrokeshire, Wales

Coordinates: 51.735°N 5.264°W

Middleholm or Midland Isle
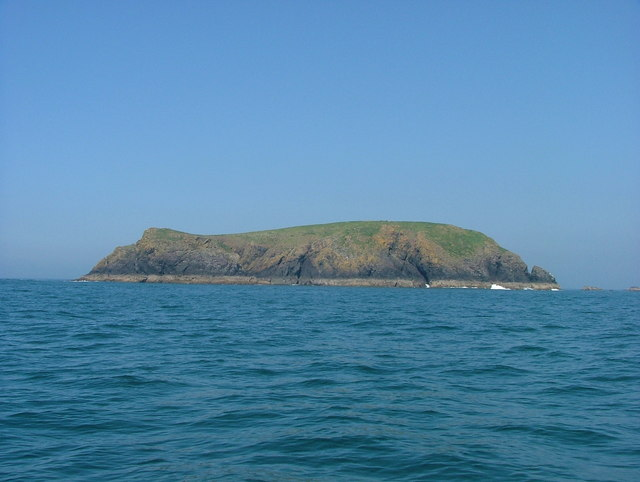

- Location within Wales

Geography
- Location: Jack Sound
- Area: 0.087 km^{2} (0.034 sq mi)

Administration
- Wales
- County: Pembrokeshire
- Community: Marloes and St Brides

Additional information
- grid reference SM74690910

Middleholm, also known as Midland Isle, is a small island lying off southwest Pembrokeshire in Wales, between the island of Skomer and the mainland in the community of Marloes and St Brides. It is roughly circular with a diameter of about 1,210 feet (370 m) and an area of 21.5 acres (8.7 ha). It is separated from the mainland by Jack Sound and from Skomer by Little Sound.

== History ==
The name Middleholm was documented in 1325 in the reign of Edward III, when ferreters were paid for catching rabbits. The island has been in use for considerably longer, with traces of Iron Age walling, and may have been used for summer grazing, despite the lack of natural fresh water. Since 1966, when the rabbit population was killed by myxomatosis, the island has been ungrazed. The name Midland Isle has been used at least as far back as 1578, when it was abbreviated in Latin as Midlan Insul. This name was also used in 1833, when it was cited in Lewis's A Topographical Dictionary of Wales. Modern Ordnance Survey maps use the latter name.

== Geology ==
The island is formed largely from a suite of volcanic rocks of Aeronian age (early Silurian) assigned to the Skomer Volcanic Group.

== Wildlife ==
The island is known for its seabirds, including Manx shearwaters and Atlantic puffins, and for its plants, including red fescue, sea beet and common tree-mallow.

== Ownership ==
The island is owned by the National Trust and managed by the Wildlife Trust of South and West Wales under a lease agreement. It is not open to the public.
