= Penparc, Pembrokeshire =

Village in Pembrokeshire, Wales

Coordinates: 51.9381°N 5.1441°W

Penparc: Welsh: Penparc
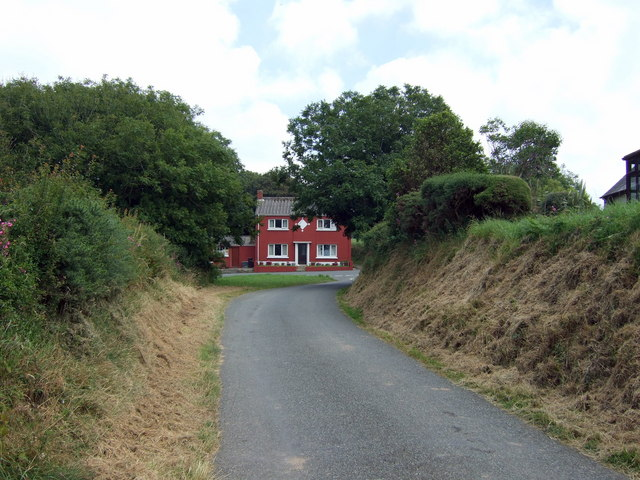
- Penparc

- Location within Pembrokeshire
- Community: Llanrhian
- Principal area: Pembrokeshire
- Country: Wales
- Sovereign state: United Kingdom
- Post town: Haverfordwest
- Postcode district: SA62
- Police: Dyfed-Powys
- Fire: Mid and West Wales
- Ambulance: Welsh

Penparc is a village in the community of Llanrhian, Pembrokeshire, Wales. Located near Trefin and Croesgoch, the village also includes the settlement of Square and Compass to the immediate east. The village composes of multiple housing estates, two holiday parks and a garage. The village is located off the A487, which runs from St Davids to Fishguard. The village is also served by a bus service connecting Haverfordwest with Fishguard via St Davids. The nearest church is in Mathry.
