= Broad Haven =

Village in Pembrokeshire, Wales

Coordinates: 51.78°N 5.1°W

Broad Haven: Welsh: Aberllydan
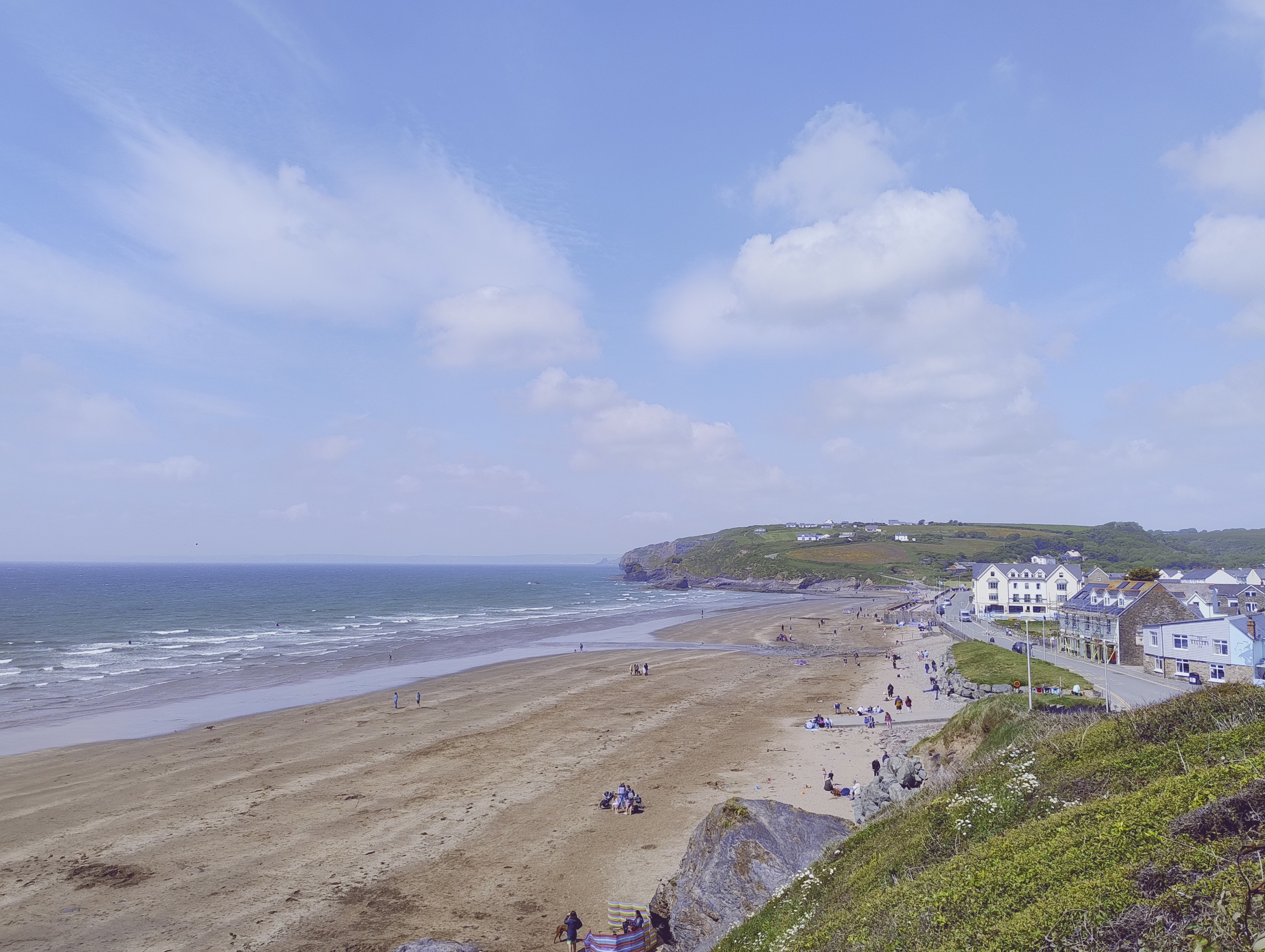

- Location within Pembrokeshire
- Community: The Havens
- Principal area: Pembrokeshire
- Preserved county: Dyfed
- Country: Wales
- Sovereign state: United Kingdom
- Post town: Haverfordwest
- Postcode district: SA62
- Dialling code: 01437
- Police: Dyfed-Powys
- Fire: Mid and West Wales
- Ambulance: Welsh
- UK Parliament: Mid and South Pembrokeshire
- Senedd Cymru – Welsh Parliament: Preseli Pembrokeshire

Broad Haven (Welsh: Aberllydan) is a village and seaside resort in the southeast corner of St Bride's Bay at the western terminus of the B4341 road in south Pembrokeshire, Wales.

Broad Haven and Little Haven are two of the villages that form The Havens, a community and electoral ward in Pembrokeshire. The 2001 census records a population of 1,328 for The Havens. The only church in Broad Haven is the Baptist church. However, there is a Church in Wales church in nearby Little Haven and the medieval church St Madoc of Ferns in nearby Haroldston West.

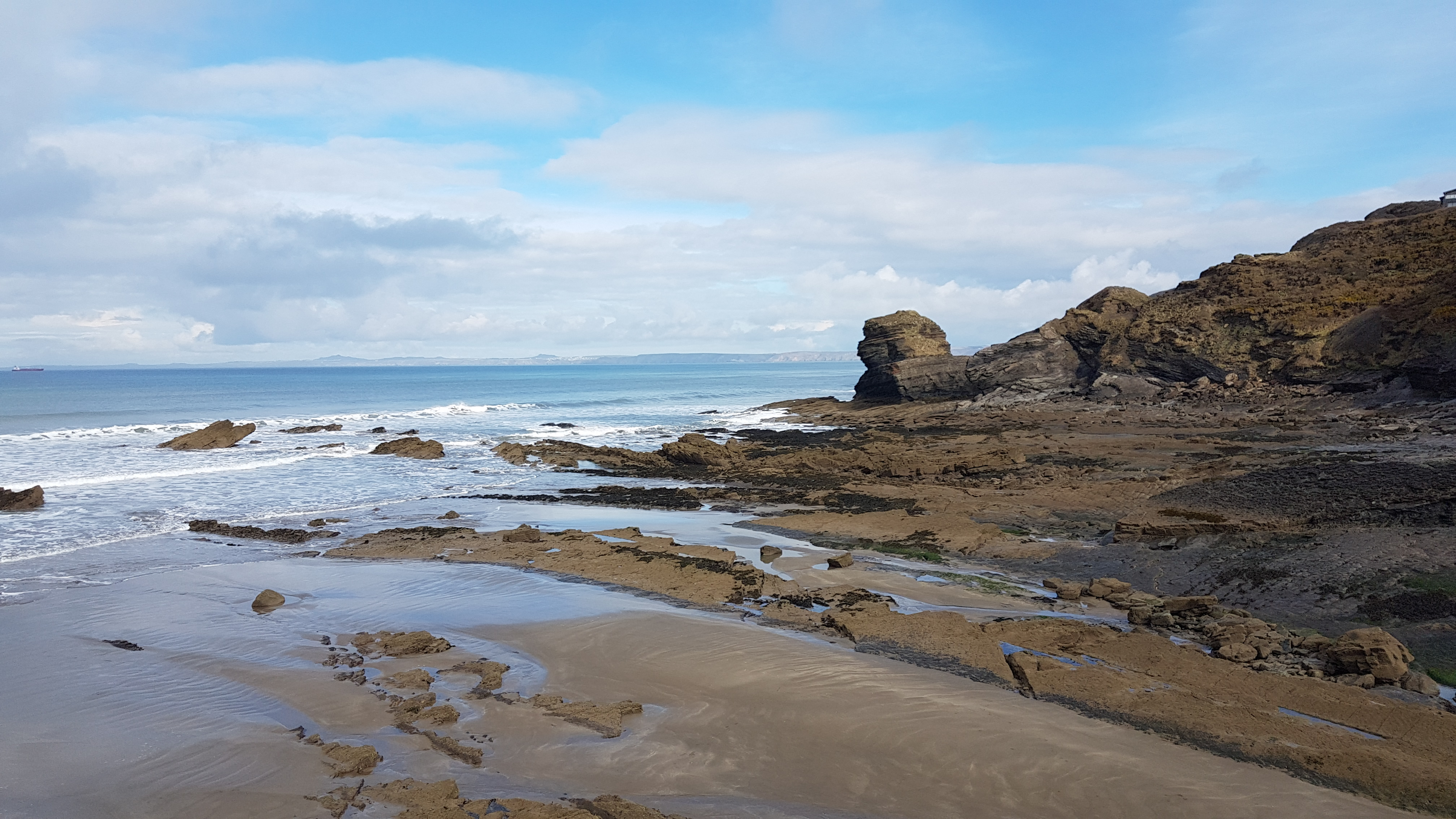
Lion Rock

It is a seaside resort with a large west-facing Blue Flag beach that is used for surfing, windsurfing, and sailing. The north end of Broad Haven beach has a number of notable geological features, including folding, a stack (locally known as Lion Rock), and natural arches. The village also has a number of restaurants and pubs.

Broad Haven is not to be confused with Broad Haven South, different beach near Bosherston in south Pembrokeshire.

== History ==
Little is known of the origins of the village but it has been known as a seaside resort since the 1800s. An RNLI lifeboat was stationed at Little Haven from 1882 to 1921. In 1967, the station was reopened with an inshore lifeboat, with the name changed to Little and Broad Haven Lifeboat Station.

== Welsh Triangle-Broad Haven-Dyfed Triangle ==
In 1977, the area was the scene of alleged sightings of unidentified flying objects (UFOs) and nicknamed the Welsh Triangle, Broad Haven Triangle, or Dyfed Triangle in the manner of the Bermuda Triangle. On 4 February 1977, a yellow cigar-shaped craft was claimed to have landed in a field next to Broad Haven Primary School, with a group of 14 children claiming to have observed the craft and a silver creature. On 17 February 1977, the same craft was claimed to have been seen by teachers at the school and other witnesses. On 19 April 1977, the owner of the Haven Fort Hotel in Little Haven claimed to have seen an "upside-down saucer" in a neighbouring field as well as two humanoid creatures. An investigator from the Ministry of Defence was unable to find any evidence of such a landing, and further speculated that "a local prankster" might have been involved.

In 2023, the incident was featured in Netflix's documentary Encounters. In 2024, Sian Eleri investigated the Broad Haven UFO sightings for series 2 of BBC Three and BBC Cymru Wales's Paranormal: The Village That Saw Aliens.
