= Maiden Wells =

Village in Pembrokeshire, Wales

Coordinates: 51.66°N 4.94°W

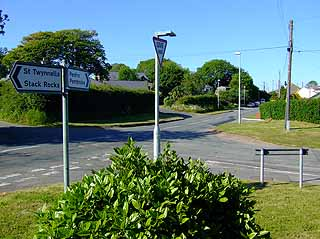

- Location within Pembrokeshire
- Population: 300
- OS grid reference: SR969995
- Community: Hundleton
- Principal area: Pembrokeshire
- Country: Wales
- Sovereign state: United Kingdom
- Post town: Pembroke
- Postcode district: SA71
- Police: Dyfed-Powys
- Fire: Mid and West Wales
- Ambulance: Welsh
- UK Parliament: Mid and South Pembrokeshire
- Senedd Cymru – Welsh Parliament: Carmarthen West and Pembrokeshire South

Maiden Wells is a small village located 1.6 miles (2.6 km) south of Pembroke in Pembrokeshire, Wales. The earliest reference to Maiden Wells is 'Mayden Welle' in 1336. The population is currently around 300.

== History ==
The village gets its name from a well in the centre of the village which is fed by an underground spring. It is said that the water from the well is associated with fertility. In the past, the village had a public house, post office and a petrol station - but all have long since closed. The village has a chapel - Gilead Calvinistic Methodist Chapel - which was completed in 1876.

== Name ==
For thirty years until 2017, road signs approaching to the village displayed 'MAIDENWELLS' leading to some confusion over the spelling. However, all current and historical maps - including Ordnance Survey - record the village name as 'Maiden Wells' rather than 'Maidenwells'.

To coincide with the opening of a new road bypass in 2017, Pembrokeshire Council sought to resolve any confusion by confirming that the correct spelling is indeed Maiden Wells and updated the road signs accordingly.

== Bypass ==
Maiden Wells has suffered with very heavy traffic since the 1960s when the Texaco (now Valero) oil refinery and Pembroke Power Station opened. Even though the road through Maiden Wells is a C-road designed for light traffic, by 2015 around six thousand vehicles a day were passing through the village including many vans, lorries and oil tankers.

Following numerous complaints and traffic accidents, Pembrokeshire County Council began a consultation with residents in the summer of 2010 about building a new road bypass. The council proposed three different routes.

The eventual chosen route generated controversy as it cuts through the centre of the village which and then passes to the north of the village.

The construction of the new road required the demolition of two cottages to make way for a new roundabout.

Work on the new road and associated drainage works began in January 2017 and the new road opened to traffic on Monday, 12 June 2017.
