= Marloes and St Brides =

Community in Pembrokeshire, Wales

Coordinates: 51.743°N 5.184°W

Marloes and St Brides: Welsh: Marloes a Sain Ffraid
- Community
- Location within Pembrokeshire
- Principal area: Pembrokeshire
- Country: Wales
- Sovereign state: United Kingdom
- Police: Dyfed-Powys
- Fire: Mid and West Wales
- Ambulance: Welsh
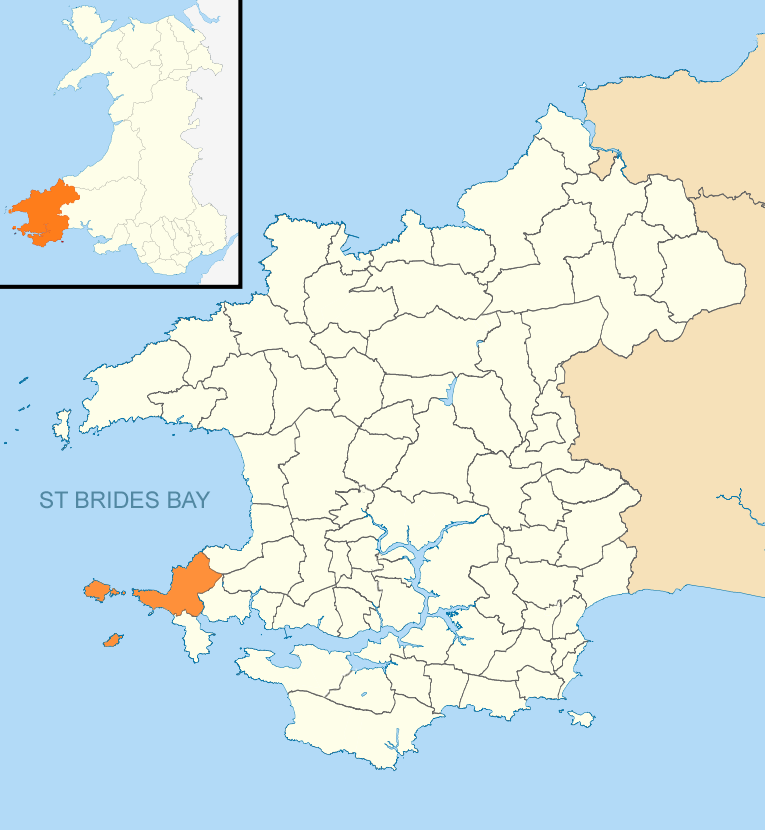
- List of places UK Wales Pembrokeshire Map of the community

Marloes and St. Brides (Welsh: Marloes a Sain Ffraid) is a community in the West Wales county of Pembrokeshire. It lies on the Pembrokeshire Coast Path and in the Pembrokeshire Coast National Park.

== Composition ==
The main settlements in the community are the villages of Marloes and St Brides; both villages lie on the southern shore of St Brides Bay.

The islands of Gateholm, Grassholm, Middleholm, Skomer, Skokholm and The Smalls lie in the community.

The community population taken at the 2011 census was 305 and at the 2021 census 330.

== Governance ==
There is an elected community council.

== Features ==
There are 26 listed buildings in the community, mostly Grade II, comprising two churches and two lighthouses, three lime kilns and a number of other houses and structures including surviving huts on Dale Airfield. The church of St Peter, Marloes, is Grade-II* and is unusual in having a total immersion font.

There is a community war memorial at the church of St Peter in Marloes.

Martin's Haven is the departure point for visitors to the island of Skomer.
