= Carreg Samson =

Neolithic dolmen in Wales

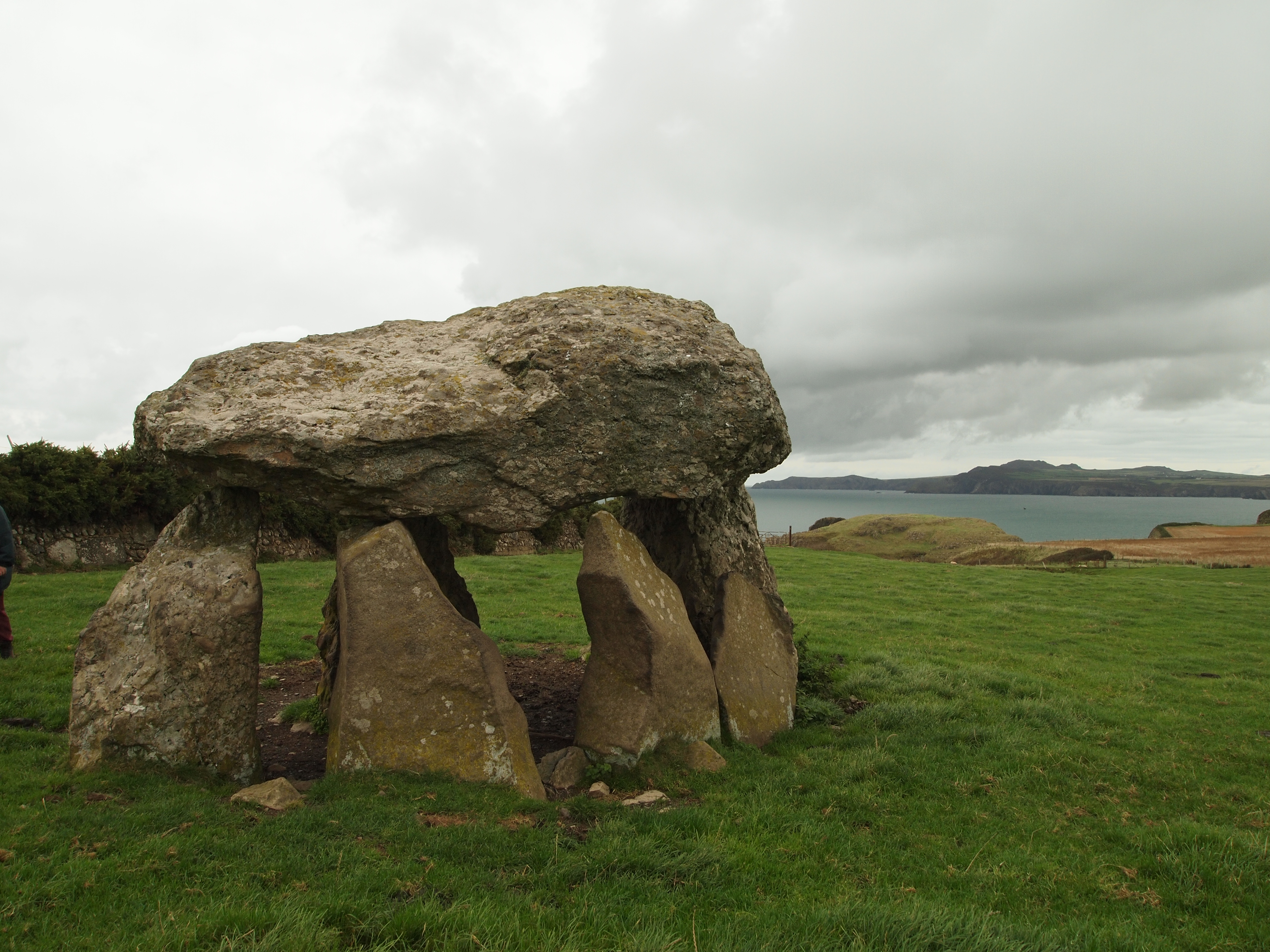

- Location within Pembrokeshire
- 51.958386°N 5.132704°W
- Type: Dolmen
- Periods: Neolithic
- Location: Pembrokeshire grid reference SM84853351

Carreg Samson (also known as Carreg Sampson, Samson's Stone, or the Longhouse) is a 5000-year-old Neolithic dolmen located half a mile west of Abercastle near the Pembrokeshire Coast Path in Wales.

== Name ==
It is called "Samson" because of a local legend that Saint Samson of Dol placed the capstone in position with his little finger.

== Description ==
Carreg Samson has a capstone, 4.7 metres by 2.7 metres and 1.0 metre thick. The capstone rests on three of six stones 1.1 to 2.2 metres high.

The whole burial chamber was once covered by a mound of earth or stones and once these were removed stones were used to block the holes in the sides of the tomb so that it could be used as a shelter for sheep.

The site was excavated in 1968 which revealed four additional stone-holes, one having supported a further chamber stone, the others indicating a possible passage leading off to the northwest. Slight traces of a covering cairn were found to the south and it was shown that the monument had been raised over a pit 0.8 metres deep, filled with clay and stones. Finds included a small quantity of burnt bone, pottery, and flints.

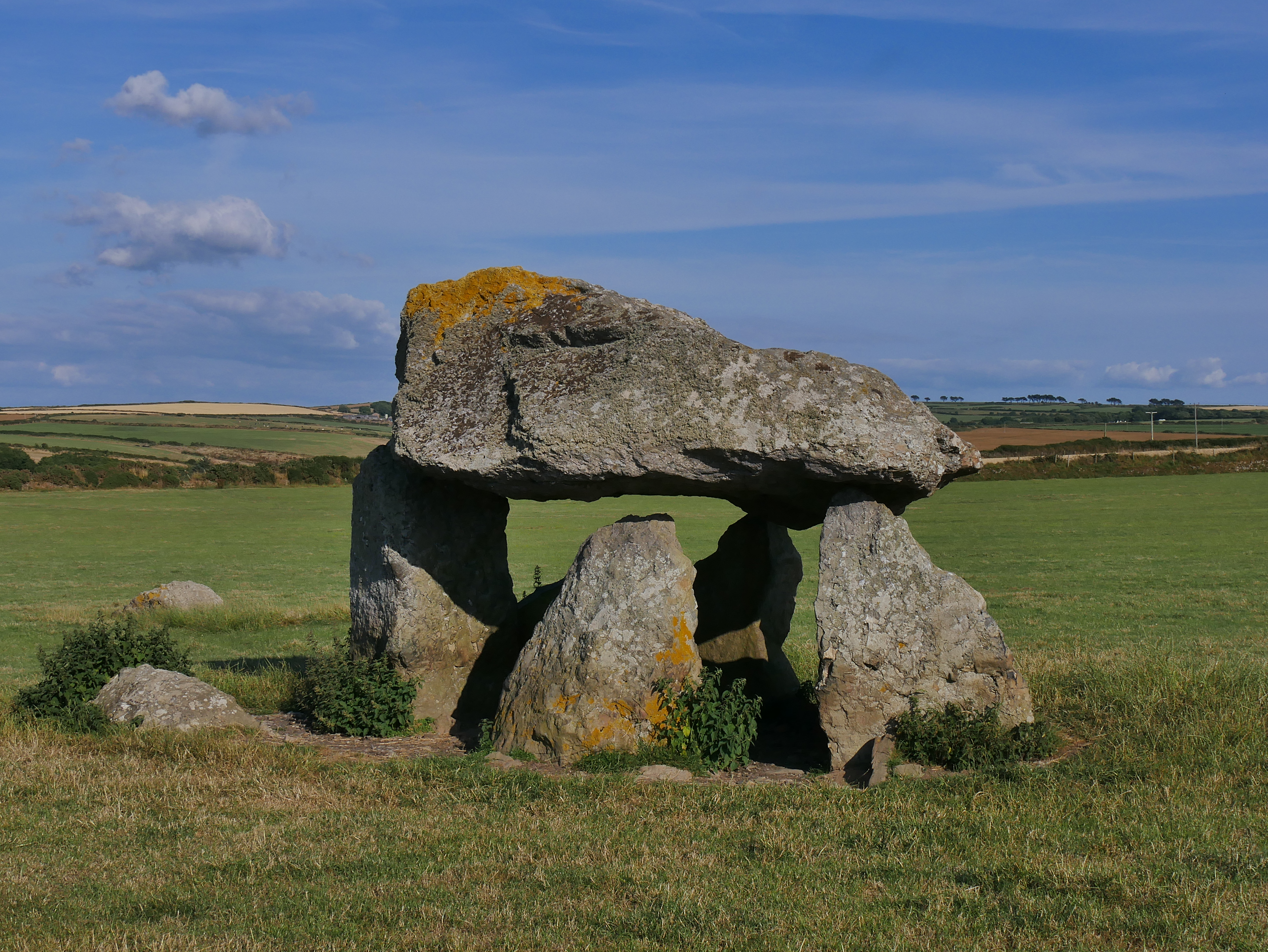
View from the north-west

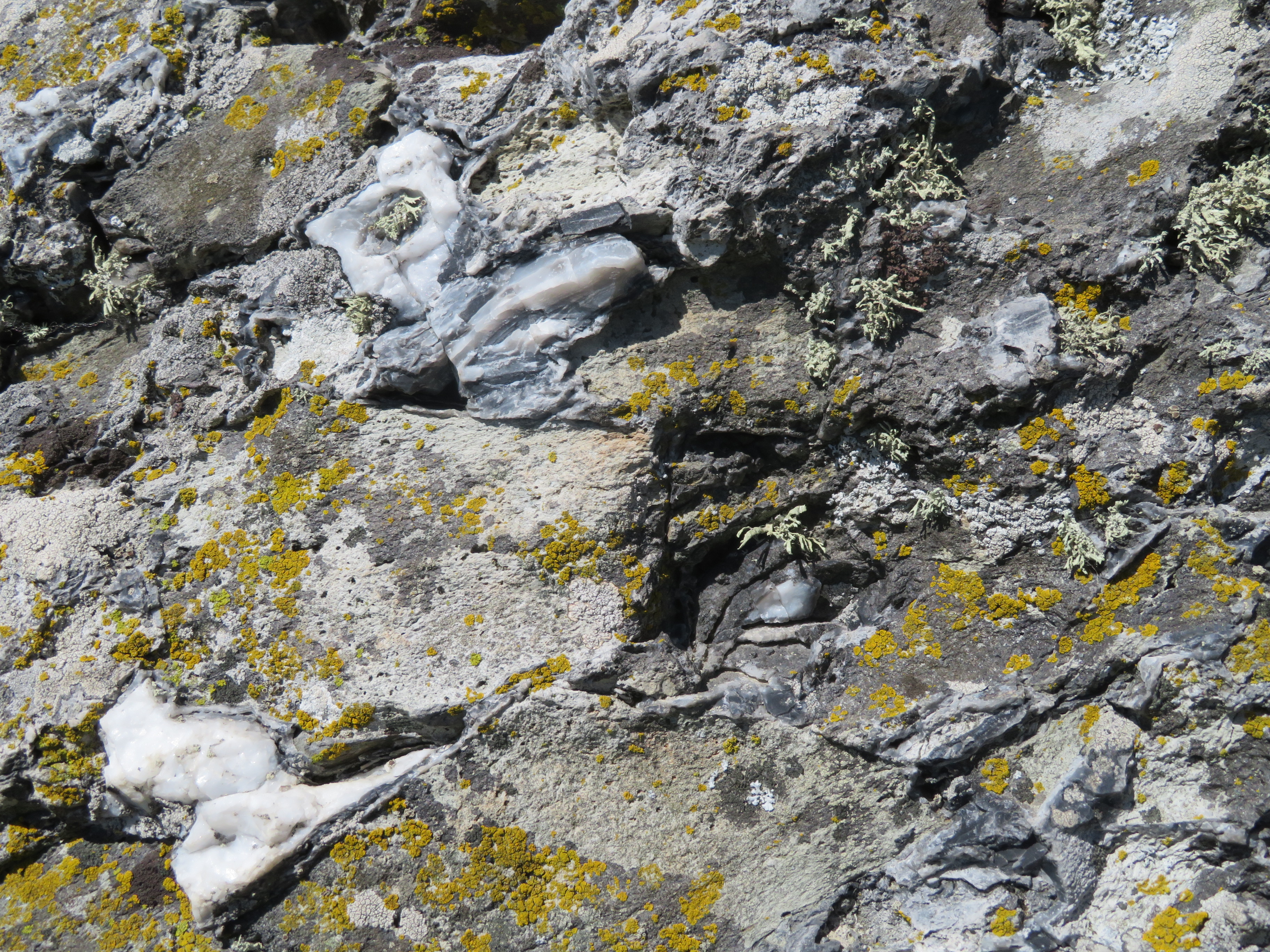
Close up

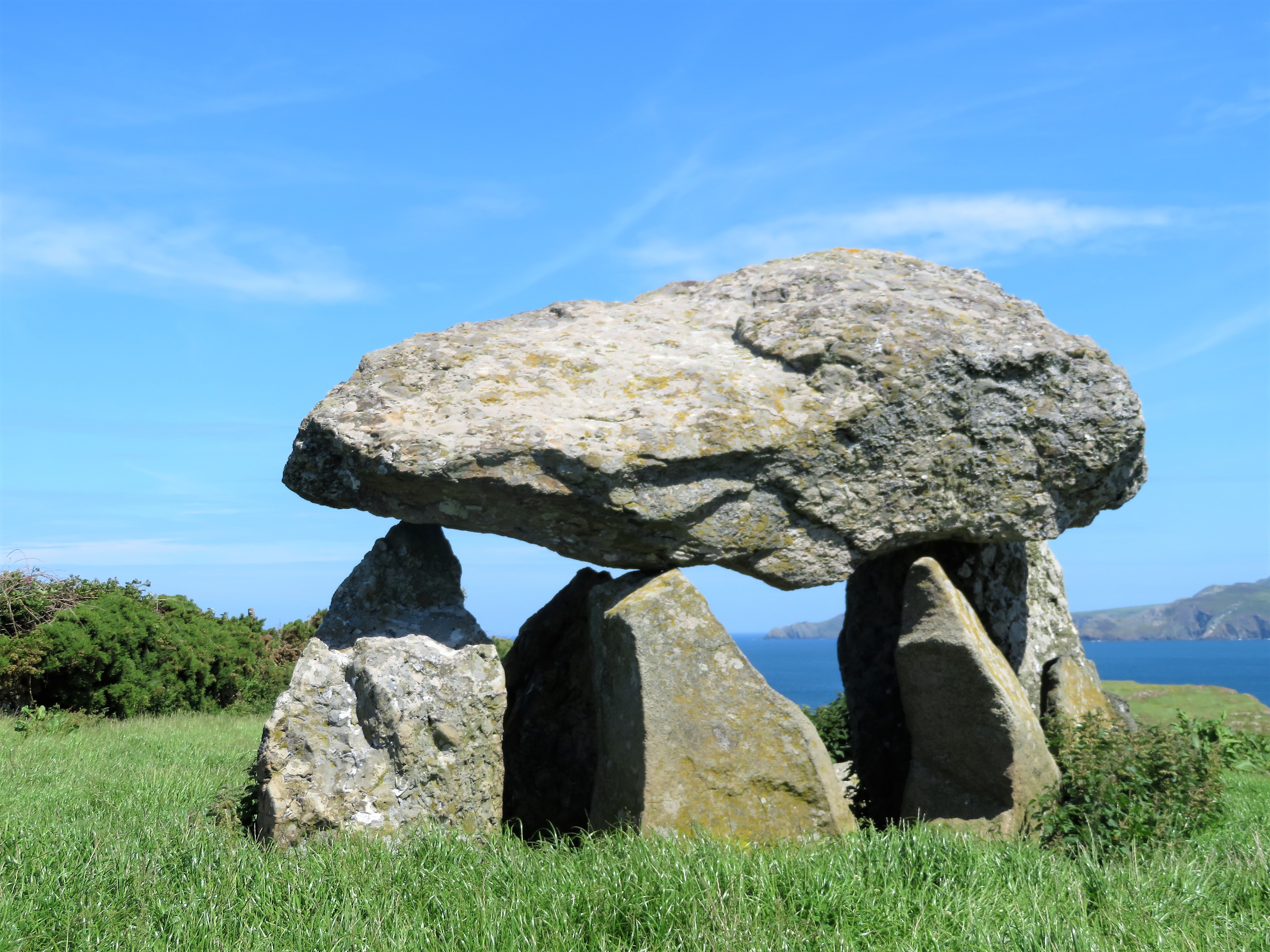

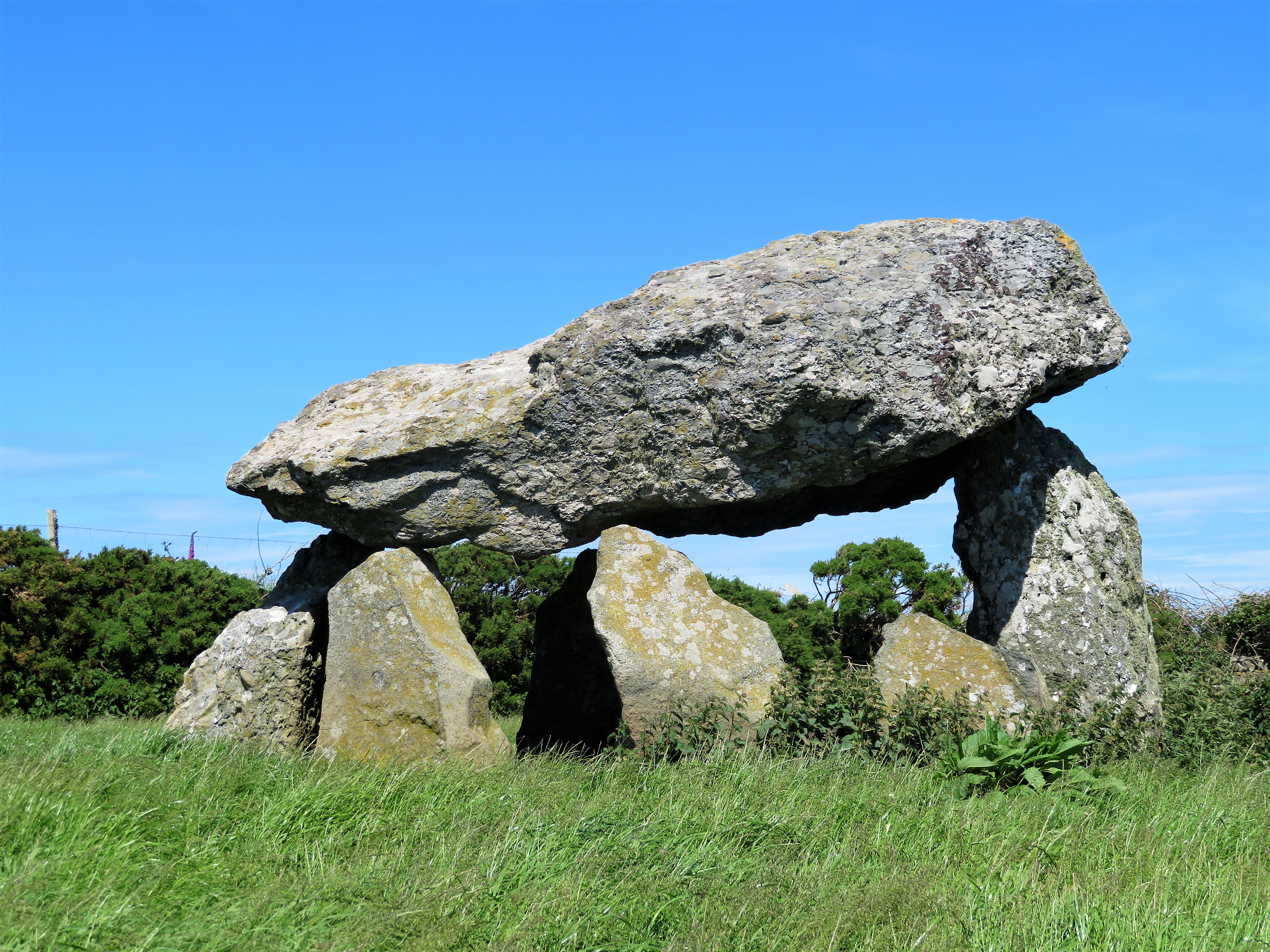

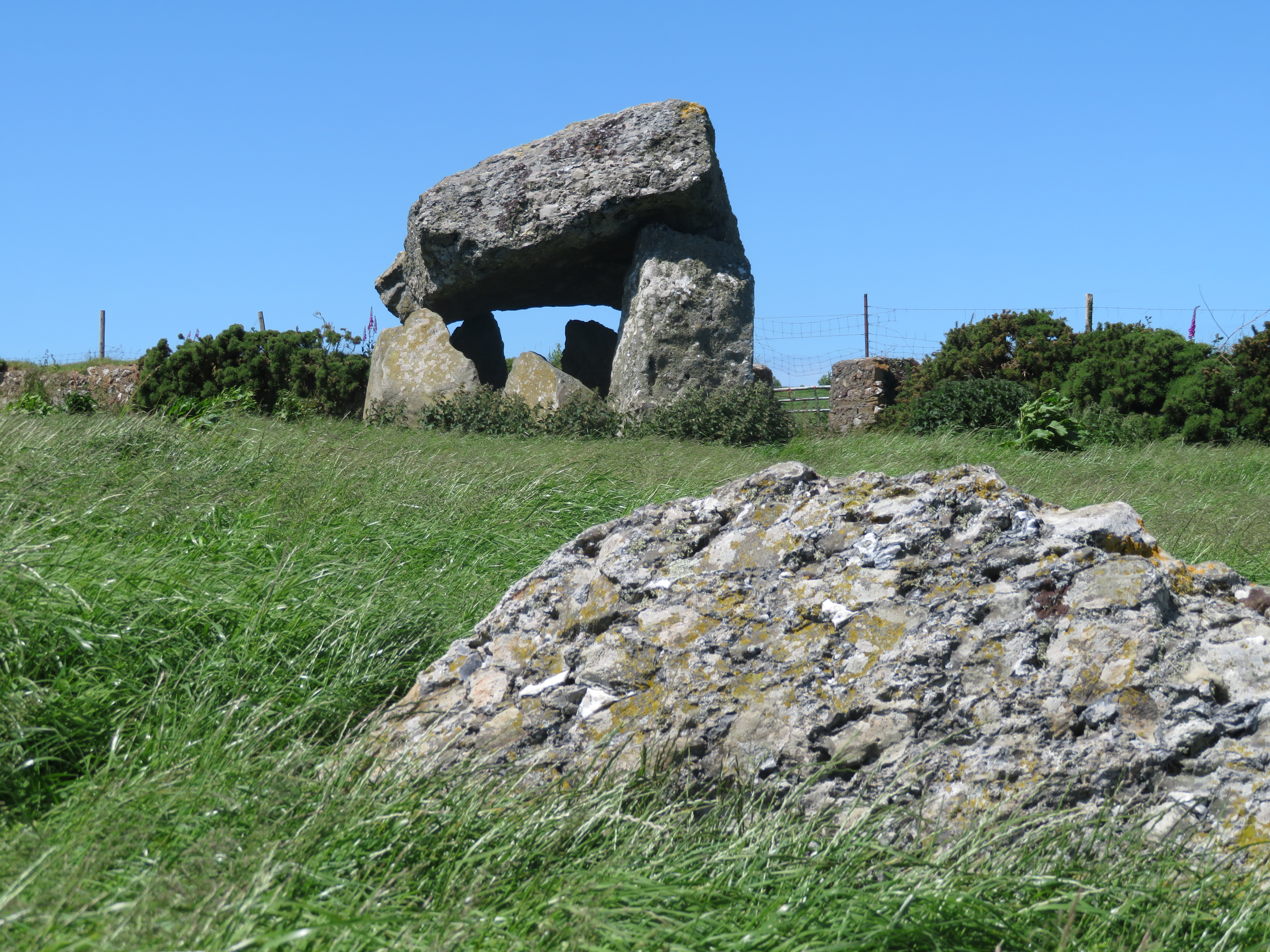

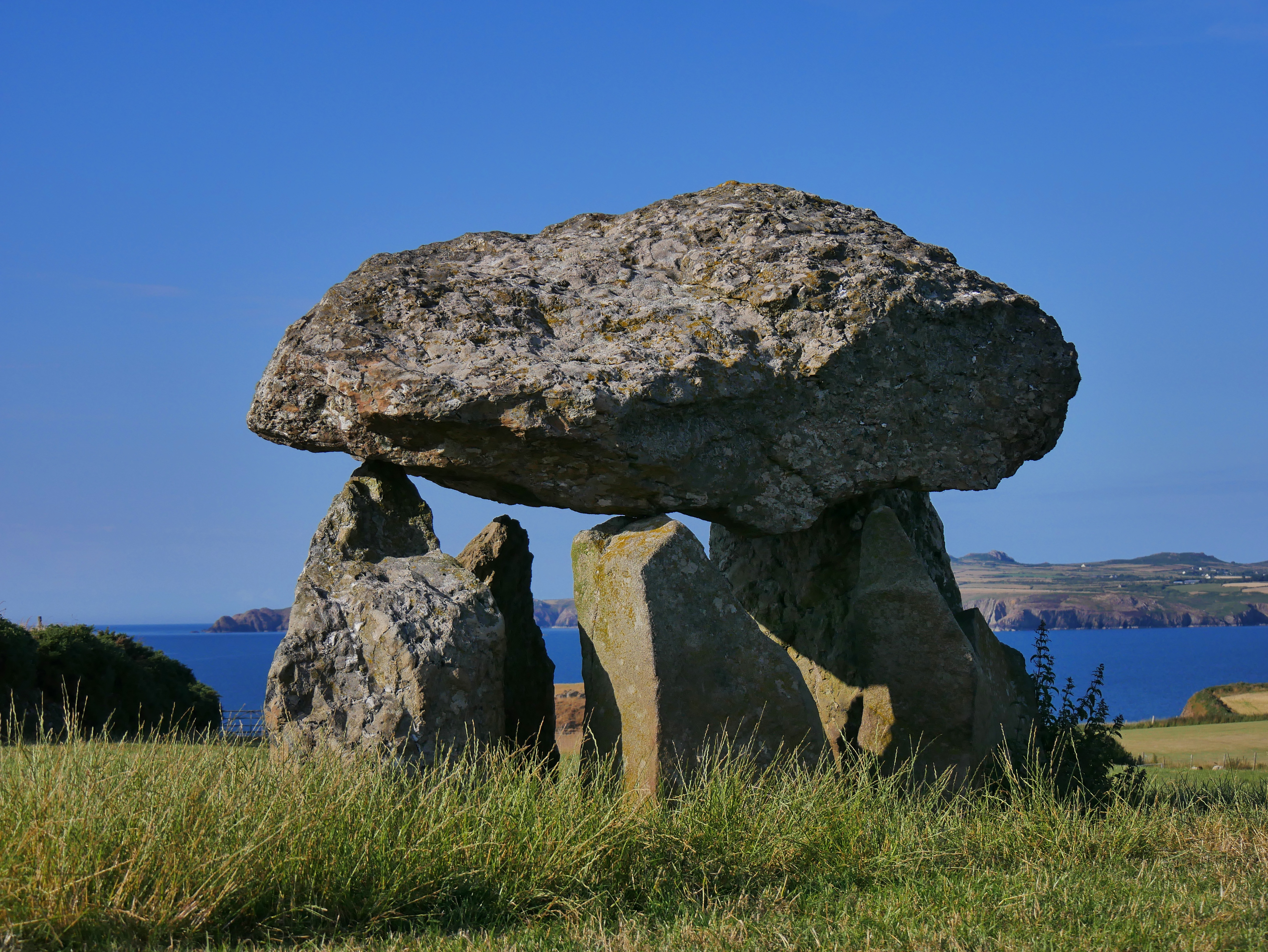
