= The Havens =

Community in Pembrokeshire, Wales

Coordinates: 51.779°N 5.098°W

- Community
- Location within Pembrokeshire
- Principal area: Pembrokeshire
- Country: Wales
- Sovereign state: United Kingdom
- Police: Dyfed-Powys
- Fire: Mid and West Wales
- Ambulance: Welsh
- List of places UK Wales Pembrokeshire Map of the community

The Havens is a community and an electoral ward in Pembrokeshire, West Wales.

== Community ==
The community includes the villages of Little Haven, Broad Haven, Walton West and Broadway hamlet. The community population taken at the 2011 census was 1,175. There is a Community Council, which meets once a month (except August), alternating between Little Haven and Broad Haven. There are 10 elected councillors and a Youth Representative. The Havens Community Development Trust was set up in 2000 for charitable purposes in the community and was dissolved in 2014.

There are seven listed buildings in the community, all Grade II, comprising two churches, an hotel, a lime kiln and three houses.

The community's population at the 2021 census was 1,087.

== Electoral Ward ==
The Havens electoral ward had a population of 1,536 in 2011, when it also included the neighbouring community of Walwyn's Castle. In 2022 the community of Nolton and Roch was added, and Walwyn's Castle was transferred to St Ishmael's ward.
