= Castlemorris =

Village in Mathry, Pembrokeshire, Wales

Coordinates: 51.9434°N 5.0534°W

Castlemorris: Welsh: Casmorys
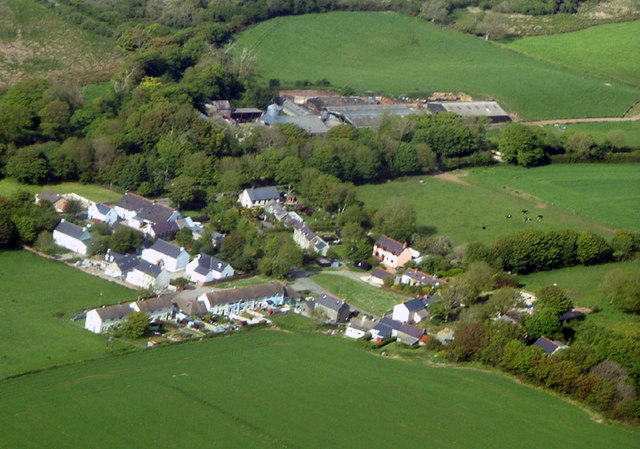

- Location within Pembrokeshire
- OS grid reference: SM9042632387
- Community: Mathry
- Principal area: Pembrokeshire
- Country: Wales
- Sovereign state: United Kingdom
- Post town: Haverfordwest
- Postcode district: SA62
- Police: Dyfed-Powys
- Fire: Mid and West Wales
- Ambulance: Welsh
- UK Parliament: Preseli Pembrokeshire
- Senedd Cymru – Welsh Parliament: Preseli Pembrokeshire

Castlemorris (Welsh: Casmorys; also known as Castle Morris or Castle Maurice) is a small village in the parish and community of Mathry, Pembrokeshire, Wales, south of the Western Cleddau river, on the B4331 road between Mathry and Letterston. It has a population of roughly 150 people.

== History ==
The Welsh manor (maenor) of Castle Morris lay within the ancient Cantref of Pebediog (later the Hundred of Dewisland). The manor was granted to Maurice FitzGerald, Lord of Lanstephan by his brother David FitzGerald, then the second Norman approved bishop of St David's,

Castle Morris may have acquired its name (Castell Maurice) in the 12th century from Maurice FitzGerald, but it may be a far more ancient relic of the pre-Norman Welsh name - Castell Marlais - Marlais then being the name of the reach of the Western Cleddau river which flows immediately below the village.

In 1302 Sir John Wogan, chancellor of St David's, secured a grant of the manor of Castle Morris for the bishop of St David's.

To the northeast of the village crossroads is the Grade II-listed farmhouse of Pencnwc, a substantial early and late 19th century building that was formerly part of the Bishop of St Davids' estate, leased by Abraham Leach in 1843, and occupied by William Evans. The farm occupies the site of a former timber castle with stone foundations, of which there are no longer any visible remains.

There was a village shop in 1902. From 1906 George Evans was the village smith. In 1910 the village shop, smithy, cottages and 43 acres of land were put up for auction, but bidding only reached £1,900 and the lot was withdrawn. The village had a post office in 1916.

== Notable people ==
Brian Morris (1930-2001), poet, critic and Professor of Literature, took the title Baron Morris of Castle Morris when made a life peer in 1990.

== Today ==
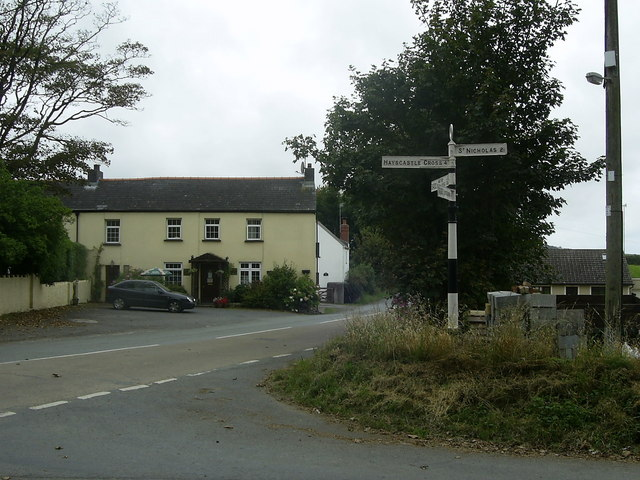
Gwesty Bach, Castlemorris

The building that housed the former shop and post office is now Gwesty Bach, the village pub.
