= St Ishmaels =

Village, parish and community in Pembrokeshire, Wales

St Ishmaels: Welsh: Llanisan-yn-Rhos
- Location within Pembrokeshire
- OS grid reference: SM835072
- Principal area: Pembrokeshire
- Preserved county: Dyfed
- Country: Wales
- Sovereign state: United Kingdom
- Post town: HAVERFORDWEST
- Postcode district: SA62
- Dialling code: 01646
- Police: Dyfed-Powys
- Fire: Mid and West Wales
- Ambulance: Welsh
- UK Parliament: Preseli Pembrokeshire
- Senedd Cymru – Welsh Parliament: Ceredigion Penfro
- List of places UK Wales Pembrokeshire 51.722°N 5.136°W Map of the community

St Ishmaels or St Ishmael's (Welsh: Llanisan-yn-Rhos) is a village, parish and community close to the Milford Haven Waterway in Pembrokeshire, Wales.

== History ==
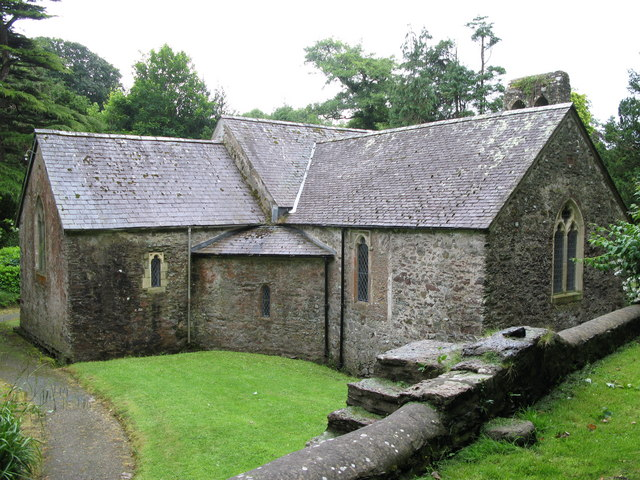
St Ishmael's church

The parish church of Saint Ismael (Welsh: Isfael) is below the village, hidden in a small valley near the Haven. In the Age of the Saints, it may have been the seat of the bishop of the cantref of Rhos. Llanismael was considered one of the principal dioceses of Dyfed under medieval Welsh law, second only to Menevia (modern St Davids). With the Norman conquest, St Ishmaels became part of the Lordship of Haverfordwest. The church is a grade II listed building

The original Baptist Chapel at nearby Sandy Haven was established in 1812 later moving to Sandy Hill on the eastern approach to the village, in 1877. Aenon Baptist Church, Sandy Hill has a baptistry in the stream. Gravestones in the cemetery have links to family names in St Ishmaels. The chapel is in use for services, weddings and community meetings.

Prince Charles's first footsteps on Welsh soil were in 1955 to the south of the village on the beach at Lindsway Bay. The royal yacht was anchored in Dale Roads.

== Governance ==
The community comprises most of the parish of St Ishmaels and had a population of 478 at the 2011 census. The ward had a total population at the 2011 census of 1,405, including the communities of Herbrandston, Dale and Marloes and St. Brides. The ward was expanded for the 2022 election with the addition of Walwyn's Castle (transferred from The Havens ward) and Tiers Cross (from Johnston ward).

== Geography ==
The south, west and east of the parish is bordered by the Haven with numerous important bird and marine life within the Pembrokeshire Coast Path. The north is mainly farmland used for both grazing and arable. The southern point of Lindsway Bay is marked by the Great Castle Head lighthouse now a private residence. The lighthouse was built in 1870, and along with the modern Little Castle Head beacon situated across Longoar Bay, serve as navigation beacons for the Rosslare-Pembroke Dock shipping route.
