= Little Haven =

Village in Pembrokeshire, Wales

Coordinates: 51.774°N 5.107°W

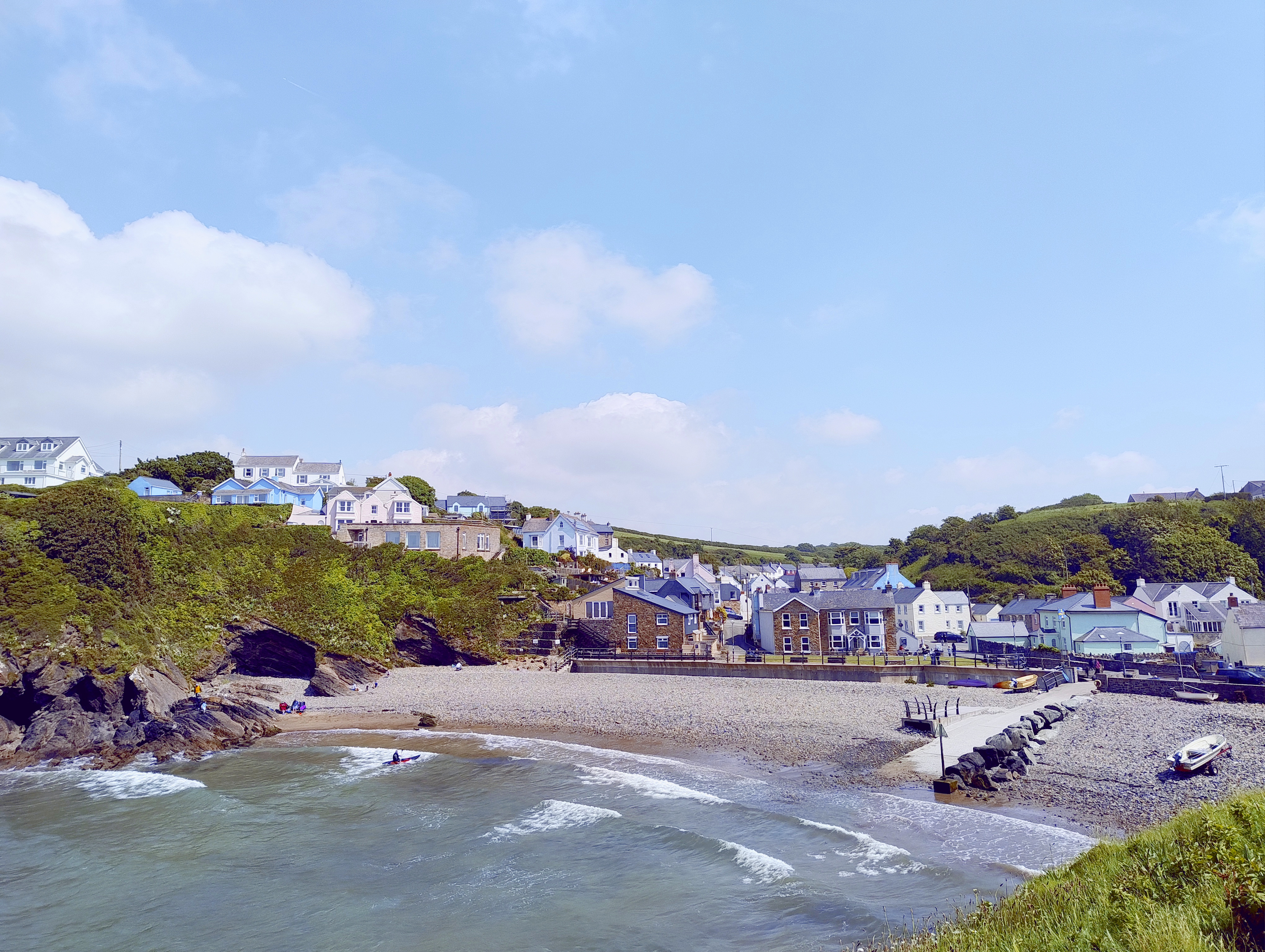

- Location within Pembrokeshire
- Community: The Havens
- Principal area: Pembrokeshire
- Preserved county: Dyfed
- Country: Wales
- Sovereign state: United Kingdom
- Post town: Haverfordwest
- Postcode district: SA62
- Dialling code: 01437
- Police: Dyfed-Powys
- Fire: Mid and West Wales
- Ambulance: Welsh
- UK Parliament: Preseli Pembrokeshire
- Senedd Cymru – Welsh Parliament: Preseli Pembrokeshire

Little Haven (Welsh: Hafan Fach) is a village at the south-east corner of St Bride's Bay, Pembrokeshire, Wales. It is in the Pembrokeshire Coast National Park. Together with Broad Haven to the north, Little Haven forms The Havens community for which the 2001 census recorded a population of 1,328.

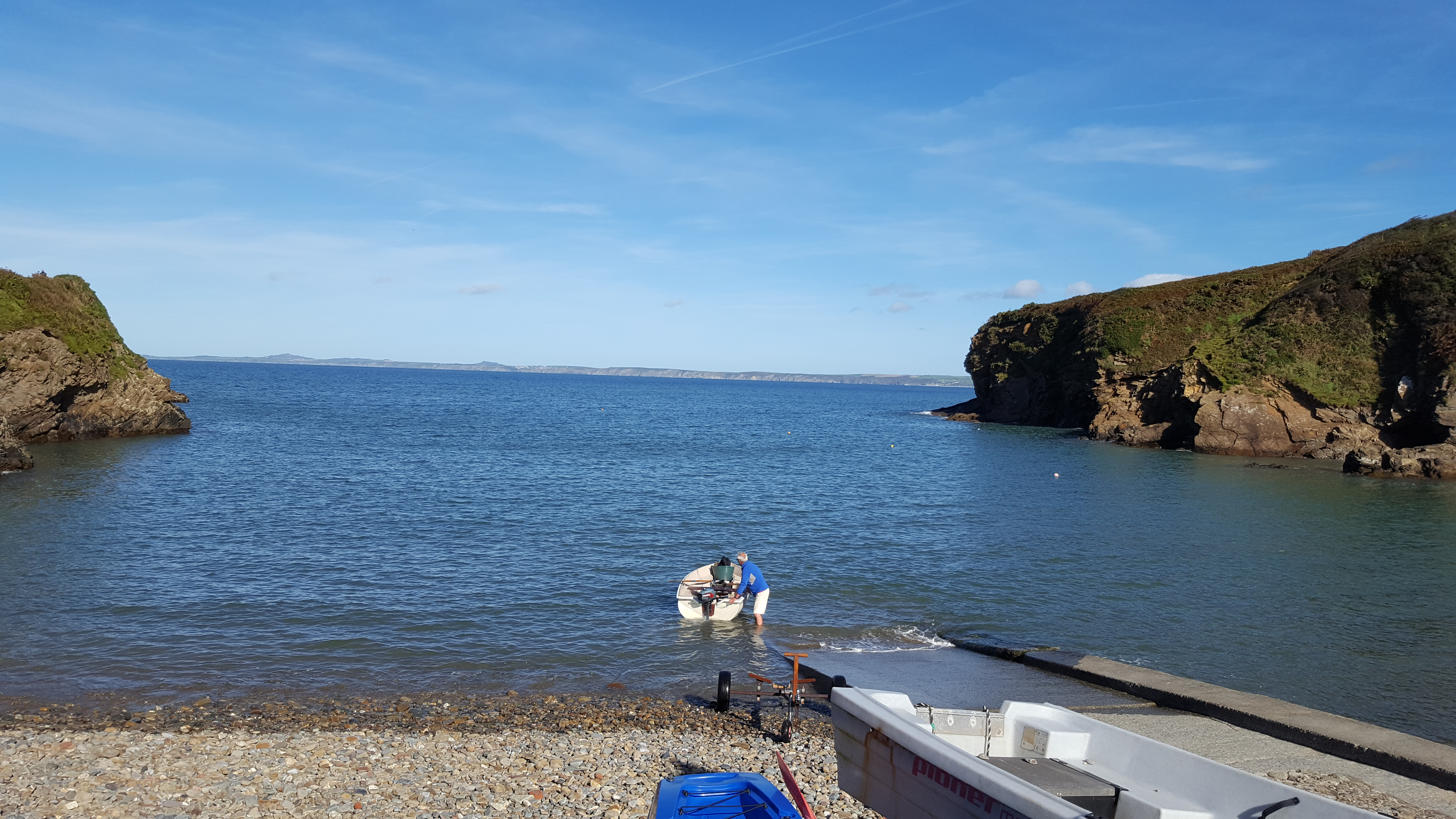
Little Haven

The Pembrokeshire Coast Path runs through the village. Since May 2012, this route has also formed a part of the Wales Coast Path. At low tide it is possible to walk north along the sandy shore from Little Haven via a larger bay known as the Settlands, past a second point ('The Rain') to the wider bay at Broad Haven. There is an Anglican church in Little Haven.

== Geology ==
Little Haven lies at the westernmost edge of the Pembrokeshire Coalfield. The local rocks are assigned to the South Wales Lower and Middle Coal Measures formations. They largely comprise faulted mudstones with thin and contorted coal seams though the cliffs to the north and the south of the bay are formed in sandstones. Woodlands Colliery once worked seams such as the Crane Vein inland of the village. The Howelston Level was driven into the ground south of the village. The east–west aligned fault runs inland from the bay whilst a series of north–south aligned faults affect the rocks of the Point to its south. The floor of the valley stretching southwestwards from the village is filled by more recent alluvial deposits.

== History ==
Little Haven has been an agricultural, fishing and coal-mining area for some centuries; coal was loaded on to coasters from the beach. Since the early 19th century. with the decline of industry in the 20th century, its primary focus has been development as a seaside resort. There are many holiday lets in the village along with three public houses.

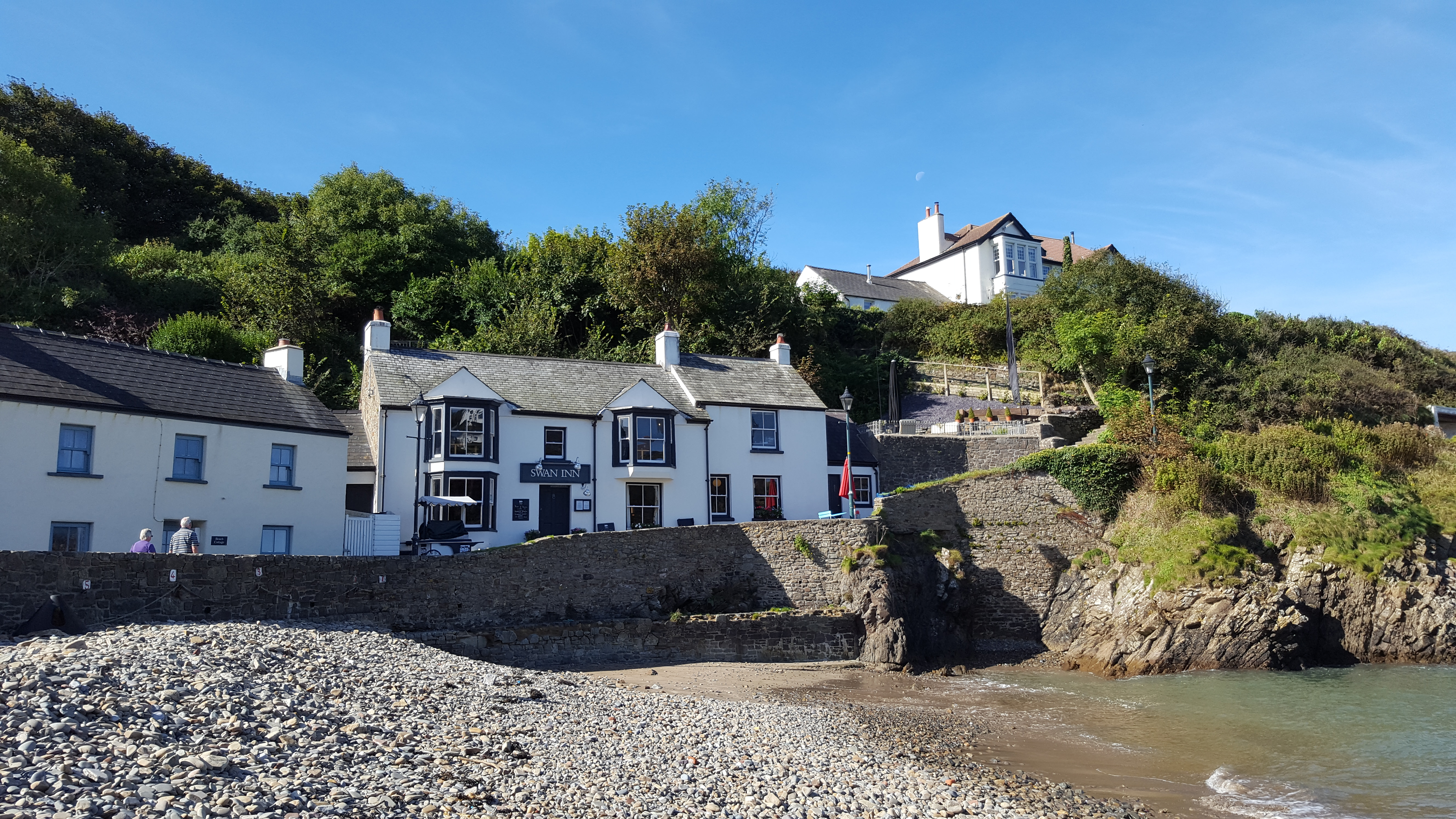
The Swan Inn

Little Haven, including the Swan Inn, is the filming location for the S4C romantic comedy series Cara Fi (English: Love Me), starring Steffan Rhodri, first aired on 9 November 2014.

== Lifeboat ==
In response to the rise in visitors to the beaches and waters of the Havens. RNLI lifeboat was stationed at Little Haven from 1882 to 1921. In 1967, the lifeboat station was reopened with an inshore lifeboat and the station name was changed to Little and Broad Haven Lifeboat Station.
