= Stone Row =

- U.S. National Register of Historic Places
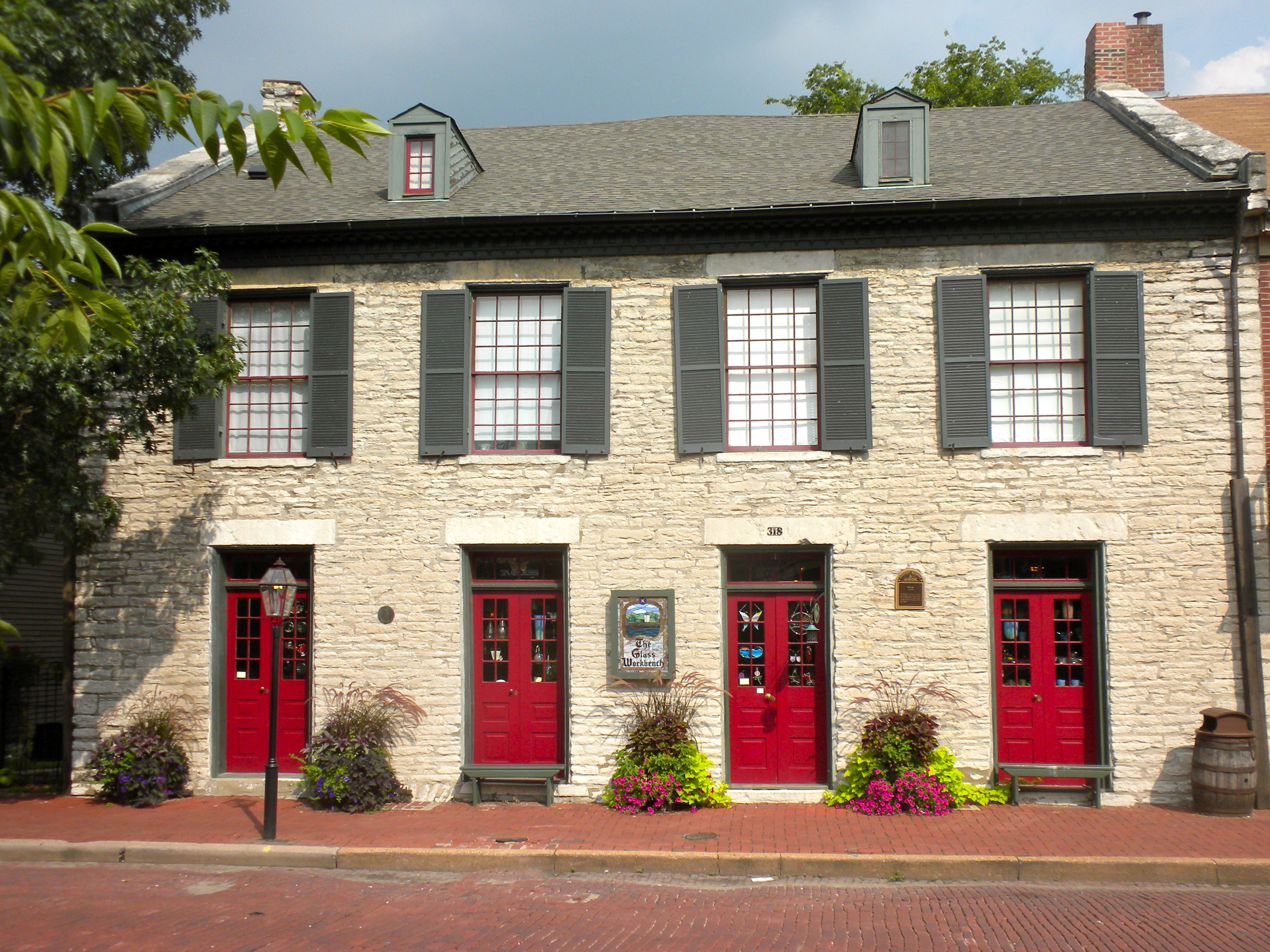
- Stone Row, July 2010

- Location within Missouri Location within the United States
- Location: 314-330 S. Main St., St. Charles, Missouri
- Coordinates: 38°46′45″N 90°28′56″W
- Area: 0 acres (0 ha)
- Built: c. 1815
- NRHP reference No.: 69000314
- Added to NRHP: July 29, 1969

Stone Row is a historic building located at St. Charles, St. Charles County, Missouri. It consists of two 2 1/2-story stone buildings built about 1815 that were once separated by a 20-foot space. About 1860, the space was filled by a 2 1/2-story brick structure. Stone Row dates to the earliest settlement of St. Charles. They were built for commercial and residential purposes.

It was added to the National Register of Historic Places in 1969.
