= Hasguard =

Parish in Pembrokeshire, Wales

Coordinates: 51.74°N 5.11°W

- Location within Pembrokeshire
- OS grid reference: SM853096
- Community: Milford Haven
- Principal area: Pembrokeshire
- Country: Wales
- Sovereign state: United Kingdom
- Police: Dyfed-Powys
- Fire: Mid and West Wales
- Ambulance: Welsh

Hasguard is a parish northwest of the town of Milford Haven in Pembrokeshire, Wales. The name applies to several other locations: Upper and Middle Hasguard, Hasguard Hall (at SM850100), Little Hasguard (SM845108) and Hasguard Cross (SM849107), this last on the B4327 Haverfordwest to Dale road, and is a recorded historic place name by the Royal Commission.

== History ==
The parish of Hasguard is rural, and was in the ancient hundred of Roose with its origins in the pre-Norman cantref of Rhôs. This and several other parishes fell within the mediaeval barony of Walwyn's Castle. By the 1830s the land was all enclosed and productive, with about 106 inhabitants. A pre-1850 parish map shows the parish with very few settlements. In the 1870s the parish was 1,475 acres (597 ha) and had a population of 125 in 23 houses. The population peaked at 175 in 1851, and fell to 79 by 1961. The 1851 census has been indexed by Dyfed Family History Society.

=== Parish church ===
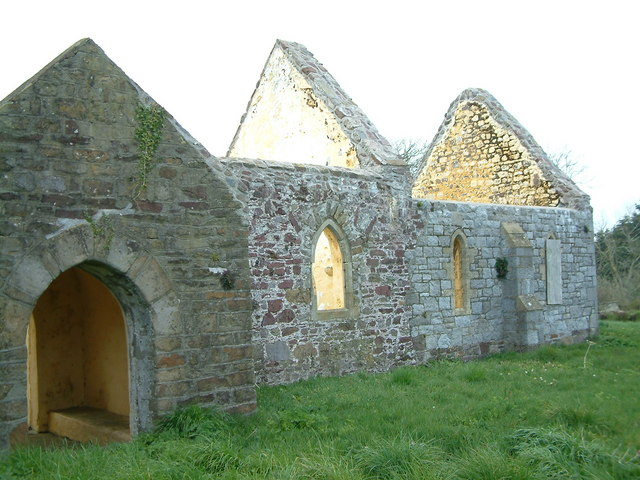
The roofless parish church of St Peter in 2008

The parish church of St Peter was built in the 1800s and was last used in the 1960s and closed in 1979 when it, and historic documentation, was acquired by the Pembrokeshire Coast National Park. The roof was removed in 2003, leaving the site "a controlled ruin".

Parish records from 1813 to 1969 are held at Pembrokeshire Archives and Local Studies in Haverfordwest.

=== Hasguard Hall ===
Hasguard Hall is documented in the 19th century as being the seat of the Ferrior (or Ferrier) family, whose Flemish ancestors date from the time of Henry Tudor. The hall was registered with the Land Registry by Little Haven Farms Limited in the 1960s. An old Quaker meeting house was mentioned in 1744 at "Hasker" but the meeting soon died out.
