= Wolf's Castle =

Village and community in Pembrokeshire, Wales

Wolf's Castle: Welsh: Casblaidd
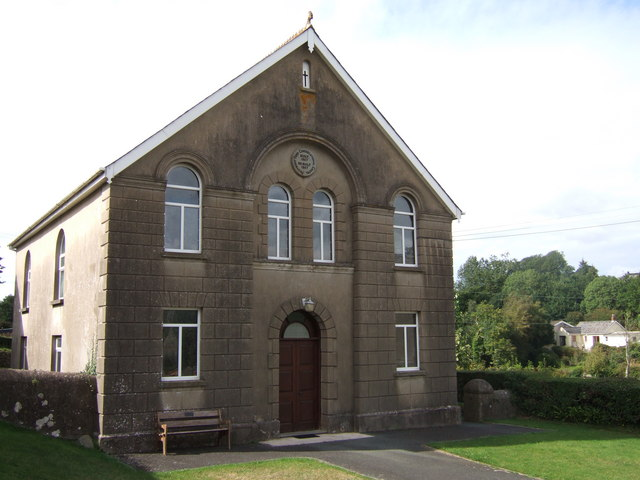
- Congregational chapel, Wolf's Castle

- Location within Pembrokeshire
- Population: 642 (2011 census)
- OS grid reference: SM957267
- Community: Wolfscastle
- Principal area: Pembrokeshire
- Preserved county: Dyfed
- Country: Wales
- Sovereign state: United Kingdom
- Post town: HAVERFORDWEST
- Postcode district: SA62
- Dialling code: 01437
- Police: Dyfed-Powys
- Fire: Mid and West Wales
- Ambulance: Welsh
- UK Parliament: Preseli Pembrokeshire
- Senedd Cymru – Welsh Parliament: Ceredigion Penfro
- List of places UK Wales Pembrokeshire 51.897°N 4.971°W Map of the community

Wolf's Castle (Welsh: Casblaidd), also spelt Wolfscastle, is a village and community in Pembrokeshire, between Haverfordwest and Fishguard, in southwest Wales. It was historically in the parish of St Dogwells.

== Geography and transport links ==
Wolfscastle comprises two small villages; Wolfscastle proper, at the top of a hill, and Ford, situated in the river valley below. The remains of a motte and bailey castle lie in the upper village, a strategic location determined by its situation at the northern end of Treffgarne gorge. The village lies at the confluence of the Western Cleddau and the Anghof rivers, in the parish of St Dogwell's.

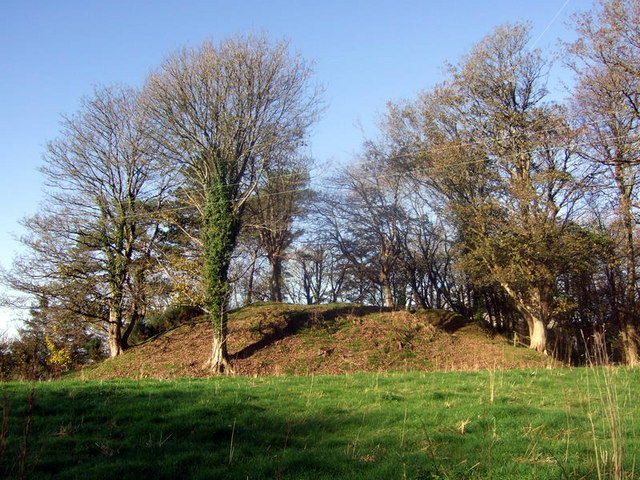
Wolf's Castle motte

The A40 road, the London to Fishguard trunk route, passes through Wolfscastle and provides the main transport route to and from the village, with a regular bus service connecting with the major towns of the area.

The main railway line from Swansea to Fishguard Harbour passes through Ford. At one time, there was a station named Wolf's Castle Halt at the point where the A40 road crosses the railway for both passengers and the loading of milk from local farms, but this was closed in 1964 when the local train service between Fishguard and Clarbeston Road was withdrawn. At the present time (2018) the line carries two daily services each way between Swansea and Fishguard Harbour, timed to connect at Swansea with services from London Paddington and at Fishguard with the Irish ferry service to Rosslare, plus a limited number of local services between Fishguard, Clarbeston Road and Haverfordwest. The latter were reintroduced in 2012, almost fifty years after being withdrawn, but the station at Wolf's Castle was not reopened as part of this initiative.

== History ==
Musland Farm was once the residence of Captain William Davies Evans, the first utiliser of the Evans Gambit in chess.

The castle formed part of the series of defences constructed by the Normans after 1093 known as the Landsker Line, providing a general boundary between the English-speaking south and the Welsh-speaking north.

A Romano-British villa was excavated by the antiquarian Richard Fenton, hinting that Roman influence extended further west than had previously been thought. It has been subjected to a recent investigation to ascertain its exact location.

The railway from Clarbeston Road station to Letterston Junction, 4¾ miles along the line north of the village, opened in 1906, replacing the former North Pembrokeshire & Fishguard Railway route from Clynderwen to Fishguard via Maenclochog and Rosebush, which did not pass close to Wolf's Castle.

== Economy ==
Mainly agricultural due to its rural location, the village does boast both the Wolfscastle Country Hotel and a public house, the Wolfe Inn. Agriculture involves dairy, sheep and beef farming, and several farms can be found within the village and its environs.

Previous economic assets included slate quarrying near Sealyham, roadstone quarrying in Treffgarne gorge and a village post office, all of which have ceased operating. Also, the running of the hall merited the employment of staff.

== Community ==
A Welsh Independent chapel, known as Pen-y-Bont, stands near the river in Ford. Several churches are to be found in the area – St Margaret's in Wolfscastle itself, St Michael's in Treffgarne, and St Dogfael's at St Dogwells (a grade II* listed building).

A community council meets monthly in the village. Every summer the Wolfscastle Festival week is held and the community council sponsors the village's annual entry in the Wales in Bloom competition. In 2005 the village won the Small Village Trophy and was runner-up in 2006. A small, twin-classroom County Primary school, built in 1834, completes the community aspect of the village.
