= Herbrandston =

Village, parish and community in Pembrokeshire, Wales

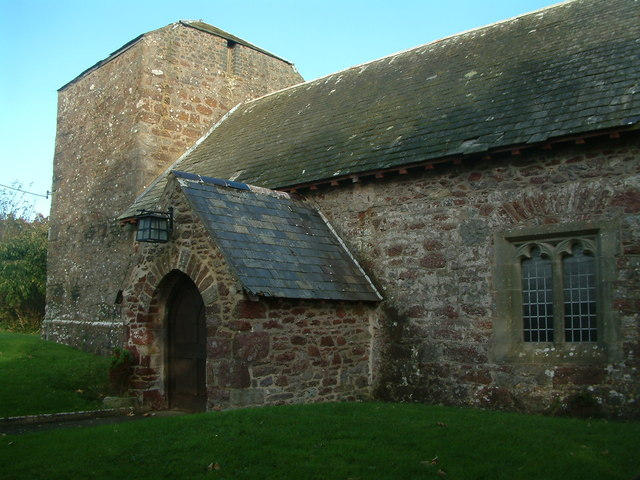
- View of St. Mary's church, Herbrandston

- Location within Pembrokeshire
- Population: 397 (2011)
- OS grid reference: SM899061
- Principal area: Pembrokeshire
- Country: Wales
- Sovereign state: United Kingdom
- Post town: MILFORD HAVEN
- Postcode district: SA73
- Dialling code: 01646
- Police: Dyfed-Powys
- Fire: Mid and West Wales
- Ambulance: Welsh
- List of places UK Wales Pembrokeshire 51.726443°N 5.085726°W Map of the community

Herbrandston is a village, parish and community on the north side of the River Cleddau, in Pembrokeshire, Wales. It is located to the west of Milford Haven and Hakin and east of St Ishmael's. Before 1960 and the building of the ESSO oil refinery, the village only had a population of 200; as infrastructure grew, so did the population. The size of the village increased within a matter of years, as housing estates associated with the refinery were built. The village has a population of 397, 15 per cent of which is Welsh-speaking.

== History ==
Herbrandston's name derives from a Norman or Flemish settler in Pembrokeshire, named Herbrand, who, soon after the Norman Conquest, settled here. It was part of the historical hundred of Roose.

=== Church ===
St Mary's church in the village contains a worn effigy of what appears to be a 14th-century knight holding a sword. Its tower has two levels; the third level, which contained battlements, was removed between 1740 and 1770. The village green was the site of an annual Hiring Fair, held on 12 August.

=== Thankful village ===
Herbrandston is one of only 14 doubly Thankful Villages in the UK, in that it suffered no fatalities during either World War I or World War II. The village is featured on Darren Hayman's album, Thankful Villages Volume 3.
