= Tiers Cross =

Village and community in Pembrokeshire, Wales

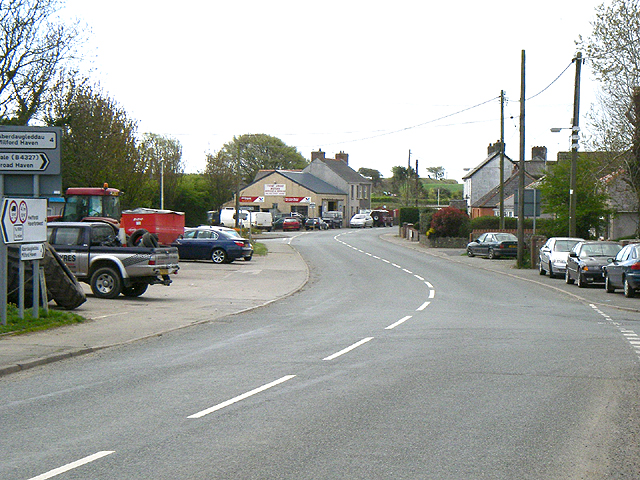
- Tiers Cross

- Location within Pembrokeshire
- Population: 576 (2011)
- OS grid reference: SM905108
- Principal area: Pembrokeshire
- Country: Wales
- Sovereign state: United Kingdom
- Post town: Milford Haven
- Postcode district: SA73
- Police: Dyfed-Powys
- Fire: Mid and West Wales
- Ambulance: Welsh
- UK Parliament: Preseli Pembrokeshire
- Senedd Cymru – Welsh Parliament: Ceredigion Penfro
- List of places UK Wales Pembrokeshire 51.76°N 5.04°W Map of the community

Tiers Cross is a village and community in Pembrokeshire, West Wales. The community includes the areas of Thornton and Dreenhill, and falls within Steynton parish. The village lies on a minor road southwest of Haverfordwest, the county town. The community is in the electoral ward of St Ishmael's; before the 2022 election it was in Johnston ward.

== Community ==
An elected community council meets once a month, apart from July and August, and are open to the public.

== Village ==
The School Room, originally built in 1932 as an educational facility, now serves as a village hall for Tiers Cross.

In July 2024 a new council housing project, the Tudor Place Project, was completed to benefit tenants with a local connection. A mix of sustainable, prefabricated and affordable homes would help locals to stay in the area.

A pub, the Welcome Traveller Inn, dating back to the 1600s, closed in 2021 and was converted to a private residence.

There are seven listed buildings in the community, all Grade II.
