= Haroldston West =

Parish in Pembrokeshire, Wales

Coordinates: 51.79°N 5.1°W

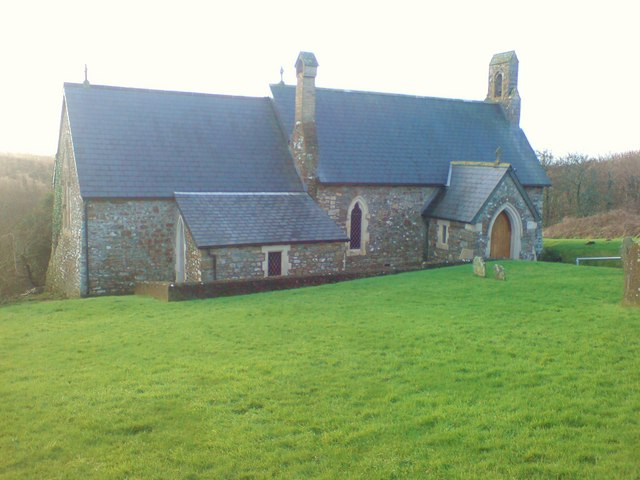
- St Madoc's Church

- Location within Pembrokeshire
- OS grid reference: SM862147
- Community: Merlin’s Bridge
- Principal area: Pembrokeshire
- Country: Wales
- Sovereign state: United Kingdom
- Post town: Haverfordwest
- Postcode district: SA62
- Police: Dyfed-Powys
- Fire: Mid and West Wales
- Ambulance: Welsh
- UK Parliament: Preseli Pembrokeshire
- Senedd Cymru – Welsh Parliament: Preseli Pembrokeshire

Haroldston West is a rural coastal parish in west Pembrokeshire, Wales, 5.5 miles (8.9 km) west of Haverfordwest.

== History ==
A number of prehistoric remains exist in the parish.

Haroldston West parish was in the ancient Hundred of Rhos, Pembrokeshire, and in 1833 had a population of 155. Its name is taken from that of an Anglo-Norman who held local lands.

In 1872 the population was 149, living in 28 houses in an area of 1,718 acres (6.95 km^{2}).

During the Second World War there was a Relief Landing Ground (RLG) for RAF Withybush called Haroldston airfield which was never used for emergency landings.

== Church ==
The parish church is dedicated to St Madoc of Ferns. Before the 1880s the church was a "barn-like old church of nave and chancel with big sash windows and a makeshift roof of salvaged ships' timbers" but had become derelict. It was rebuilt in 1885.
