= Mathry =

Village, parish and community in Pembrokeshire, Wales

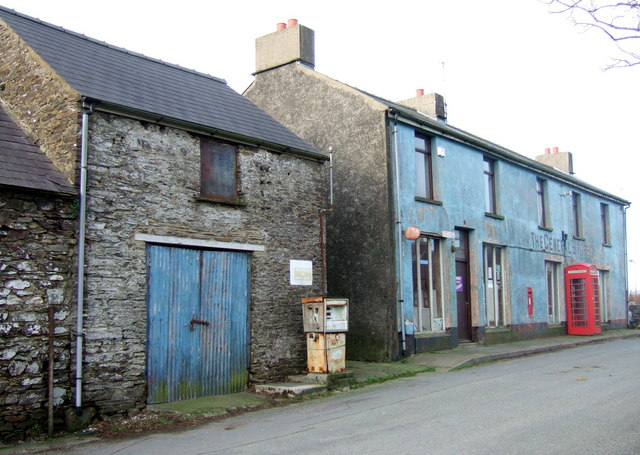
- The General Stores in Mathry in 2007

- Location within Pembrokeshire
- Population: 572 (2011)
- OS grid reference: SM875315
- Community: Mathry
- Principal area: Pembrokeshire
- Country: Wales
- Sovereign state: United Kingdom
- Post town: Haverfordwest
- Postcode district: SA62
- Dialling code: 01348
- Police: Dyfed-Powys
- Fire: Mid and West Wales
- Ambulance: Welsh
- UK Parliament: Preseli Pembrokeshire
- Senedd Cymru – Welsh Parliament: Ceredigion Penfro
- List of places UK Wales Pembrokeshire 51.945785°N 5.089669°W Map of the community

Mathry (Welsh: Mathri) is a village, community and parish in Pembrokeshire, Wales. The hilltop village is 6 miles (9.7 km) southwest of Fishguard, close to the A487 road between Fishguard and St David's.

== History ==
Mathry (formerly Mathrey or Merthyr) meaning "martyr" in English, was in the hundred of Dewisland. A weekly market and annual fair were granted by letters patent in the reign of Edward III. The market had ceased by 1833 but the fair, on 10 October, still continued. Originally on the turnpike between Fishguard and St David's, it is now just north of the modern A487. There were 860 inhabitants in the parish in the early 1800s and a school for poor children was subsidised by Sir John Owen to the tune of £10 a year. The parish, prior to 1850, was one of scattered settlements, with slate quarrying employing local people.

== Community ==
Mathry community includes the villages of Abercastle and Castlemorris. Mathry Community Council meets once a month in Mathry Community Hall.

== Parish ==
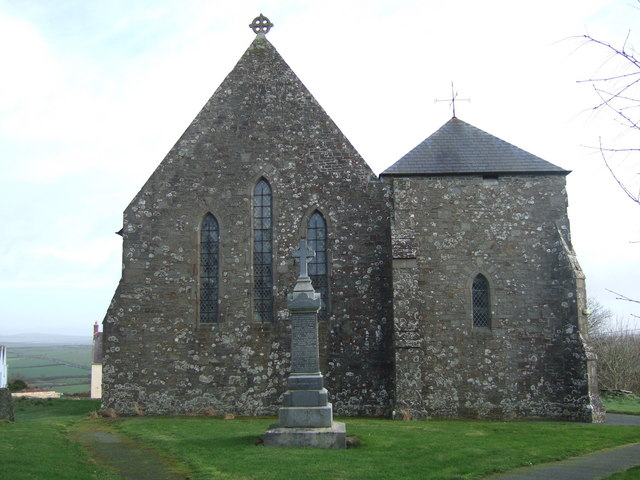
Mathry parish church

The parish church of the Holy Martyrs, dedicated to seven sainted men of Mathry, is in the centre of the village. It was built in 1869 on older foundations and restored in 1902. Richard Fenton wrote that the church of his day originally had a steeple which was blown down in a storm.

== Notable people ==
A genealogical search in 2006 by a Pembrokeshire man found that a Jemima Nicholas was baptised in the parish of Mathry on 2 March 1755. Haverfordwest Records Office thought this was likely to be the same Jemima Nicholas associated with the Battle of Fishguard.
