= Walwyn's Castle =

Village, parish and community in Pembrokeshire, Wales

Walwyn's Castle: Welsh: Castell Gwalchmai
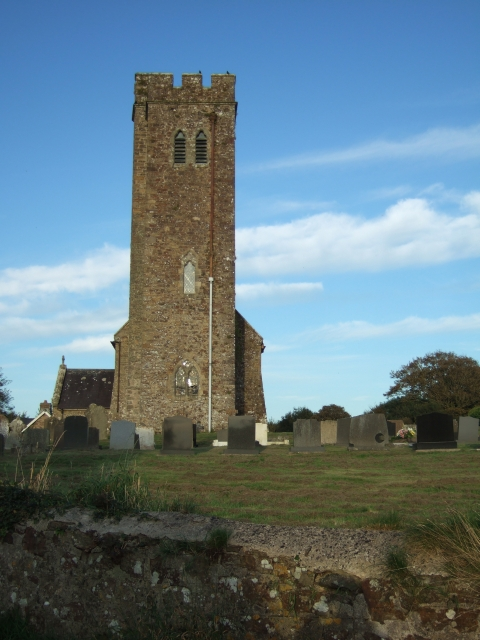

- Location within Pembrokeshire
- Population: 361
- OS grid reference: SM 8727 1121
  - Cardiff: 84.1 mi (135.3 km)
  - London: 213.2 mi (343.1 km)
- Community: Walwyn's Castle
- Principal area: Pembrokeshire
- Country: Wales
- Sovereign state: United Kingdom
- Post town: Haverfordwest
- Postcode district: SA62
- Police: Dyfed-Powys
- Fire: Mid and West Wales
- Ambulance: Welsh
- UK Parliament: Preseli Pembrokeshire
- Senedd Cymru – Welsh Parliament: Ceredigion Penfro
- List of places UK Wales Pembrokeshire 51.759114°N 5.083859°W Map of the community

Walwyn's Castle (Welsh: Castell Gwalchmai) is a village, parish and community in the county of Pembrokeshire, Wales, and is 84 miles (135 km) from Cardiff and 213 miles (343 km) from London. In 2011 the community's population was 361.

== Community ==
The community of Walwyn's Castle consists of the parishes of Walwyn's Castle itself and the parishes of Hasguard and Robeston West.

In 2011 the population of the community of Walwyn's Castle was 355 with 15.2 per cent able to speak Welsh.

== History ==
In his 12th century Gesta Regum Anglorum, William of Malmesbury claimed that the grave of Gawain (Latin: Walwen, Welsh: Gwalchmai) was found here around the end of the 11th century and that the castle mound covers the site.

A castle was built within an Iron Age Hill fort by the Normans. There is an historic rath overlooking Walwyn's Castle. A geophysical survey was carried out in 2011.

Walwyn's Castle was in the ancient hundred of Roose with its origins in the pre-Norman cantref of Rhôs. This and several other parishes fell within the mediaeval Barony of Walwyn's Castle, the caput of the Marcher Lord.

== Parish ==
The parish of Walwyn's Castle includes several scattered settlements.

=== Parish church ===
The earliest-known reference to Walwyn's Castle Church was 1291. The church was rebuilt around 1869 to 1878. Today the Church is in good repair with services held there every Sunday.

The nearby Baptist Chapel, Aenon, Sandy Hill, built 1877, has a cemetery. Gravestones reveal names linking to families from Walwyn and the local communities. The Chapel was internally renovated in 2020 and meets for worship on Sundays, and various midweek activities.

=== School ===
The village school closed in the late 1950s, converted to a village hall, and substantially renovated in 2004.

== See also ==
- List of localities in Wales by population
