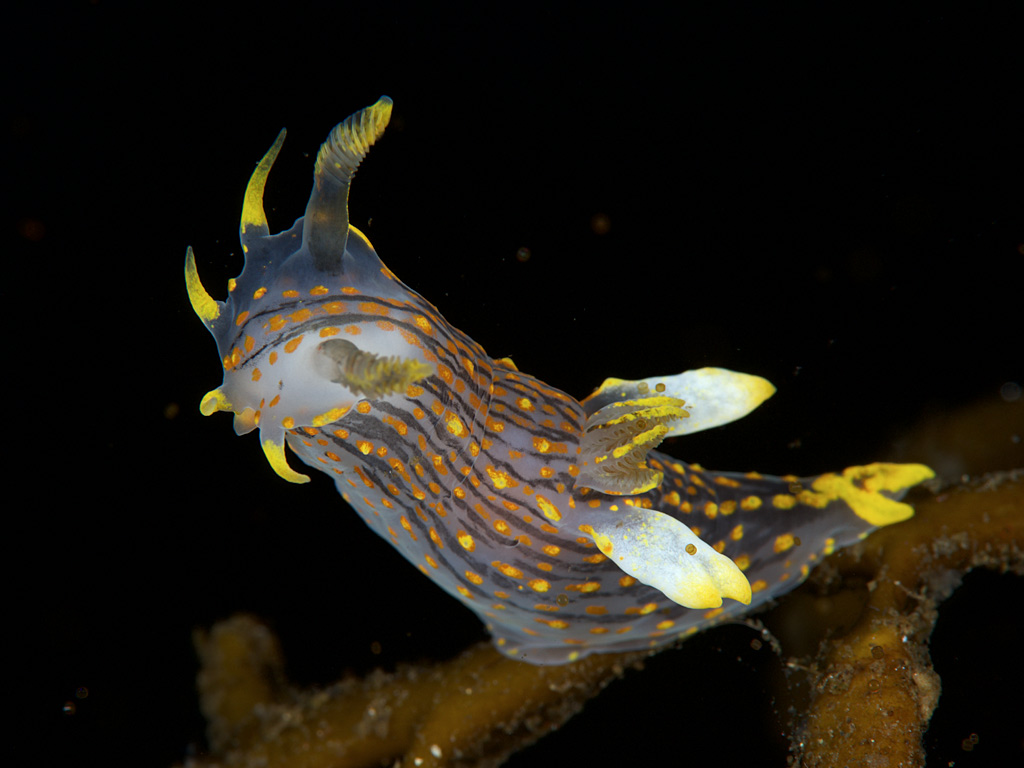
- The nudibranch Polycera quadrilineata, in situ, Gulen Dive Resort, Norway.

Scientific classification
- Kingdom: Animalia
- Phylum: Mollusca
- Class: Gastropoda
- Order: Nudibranchia
- Family: Polyceridae
- Subfamily: Polycerinae
- Genus: Polycera; Cuvier, 1817

Type species
- Polycera quadrilineata Muller, 1776

Synonyms
- Galacera Risso-Dominguez, 1960; Polyceras Locard, 1886 (Unjustified emendation); Greilada Bergh, 1894

= Polycera =

Genus of gastropods

Polycera is a genus of sea slugs, specifically nudibranchs, shell-less marine gastropod molluscs in the family Polyceridae.

Polycera is the type genus of the family Polyceridae.

== Species ==
Species in the genus Polycera include:

- Polycera abei (Baba, 1960)
- Polycera alabe Collier & Farmer, 1964
- Polycera anae Pola, Sánchez-Benítez & Ramiro, 2014
- Polycera atra MacFarland, 1905
- Polycera aurantiomarginata García-Gómez & Bobo, 1984
- Polycera aurisula Er. Marcus, 1957
- Polycera capensis Quoy & Gaimard, 1824
- Polycera chilluna Er. Marcus, 1961
- Polycera elegans (Bergh, 1894) alternate representation of Greilada elegans
- Polycera enesithsaba Toms, Pola, von der Heyden & Gosliner, 2026
- Polycera faeroensis Lemche, 1929
- Polycera fujitai Baba, 1937
- Polycera hedgpethi Er. Marcus, 1964
- Polycera herthae Ev. Marcus & Er. Marcus, 1963
- Polycera hummi Abbott, 1952
- Polycera janjukia Burn, 1962
- Polycera japonica Baba, 1949
- Polycera kaiserae Hermosillo & Valdés, 2007
- Polycera kernowensis Korshunova, Driessen, Picton & Martynov, 2021
- Polycera lini S.-Q. Zhang & S.-P. Zhang, 2023
- Polycera maculata Pruvot-Fol, 1951
- Polycera maddoxi Miller, 2005
- Polycera manzanilloensis Ortea, Espinosa & Camacho, 1999
- Polycera marplatensis Franceschi, 1928
- Polycera melanosticta Miller, 1996
- Polycera namaquae Toms, Pola, von der Heyden & Gosliner, 2026
- Polycera nimbsi Pola, Miguel-González & Paz-Sedano, 2023
- Polycera norvegica Sørensen, Rauch, Pola & Malaquias, 2020
- Polycera odhneri Er. Marcus, 1955
- P. onomqhele Toms, Pola, von der Heyden & Gosliner, 2026
- Polycera parvula (Burn, 1958)
- Polycera picta Risbec, 1928
- Polycera priva Er. Marcus, 1959
- Polycera quadrilineata (O. F. Müller, 1776)
- Polycera risbeci Odhner, 1941
- Polycera rycia Er. Marcus & Ev. Marcus, 1970
- Polycera sp. twin-crowned nudibranch
- Polycera tricolor Robilliard, 1971
- Polycera xicoi Ortea & Rolán, 1989

Species brought into synonymy

- Polycera atlantica Pruvot-Fol, 1956: synonym of Polycera elegans (Bergh, 1894)
- Polycera citrina Alder & Hancock, 1841: synonym of Palio dubia (M. Sars, 1829)
- Polycera conspicua Allan, 1932: synonym of Polycera capensis Quoy & Gaimard, 1824
- Polycera cooki Angas, 1864: synonym of Paliolla cooki (Angas, 1864)
- Polycera cornigera Adams & Reeve in Adams, 1848: synonym of Ceratosoma trilobatum (J.E. Gray, 1827)
- Polycera cristata Alder, 1841: synonym of Ancula gibbosa (Risso, 1818)
- Polycera dubia M. Sars, 1829: synonym of Palio dubia (M. Sars, 1829)
- Polycera gnupa Er. Marcus & Ev. Marcus, 1967: synonym of Polycera hedgpethi Er. Marcus, 1964
- Polycera horrida Hesse, 1872: synonym of Aegires punctilucens (d'Orbigny, 1837)
- Polycera incognita (Ortea, Espinosa & Caballer, 2005): synonym of Kankelibranchus incognitus Ortea, Espinosa & Caballer, 2005
- Polycera lessoni d'Orbigny, 1837: synonym of Palio dubia (M. Sars, 1829)
- Polycera lessonii d'Orbigny, 1837: synonym of Palio dubia (M. Sars, 1829)
- Polycera lineatus Risso, 1826: synonym of Polycera quadrilineata (O. F. Müller, 1776)
- Polycera mediterranea Bergh, 1879: synonym of Polycera quadrilineata (O. F. Müller, 1776)
- Polycera messinensis Odhner, 1941: synonym of Polycera elegans (Bergh, 1894)
- Polycera modesta Lovén, 1846: synonym of Palio dubia (M. Sars, 1829)
- Polycera nigrocrocea Barnard, 1927: synonym of Polycera capensis Quoy & Gaimard, 1824
- Polycera nigrolineata Dautzenberg & Durouchoux, 1913: synonym of Polycera quadrilineata (O. F. Müller, 1776)
- Polycera nigropicta Ihering, 1885: synonym of Polycera quadrilineata (O. F. Müller, 1776)
- Polycera nothus (Johnston, 1838): synonym of Palio nothus (Johnston, 1838)
- Polycera ocellata Alder & Hancock, 1842: synonym of Palio nothus (Johnston, 1838)
- Polycera ornata d'Orbigny, 1837: synonym of Polycera quadrilineata (O. F. Müller, 1776)
- Polycera pudica Lovén, 1846: synonym of Palio dubia (M. Sars, 1829)
- Polycera punctilucens d'Orbigny, 1837: synonym of Aegires punctilucens (d'Orbigny, 1837)
- Polycera salamandra Labbé, 1931: synonym of Polycera quadrilineata (O. F. Müller, 1776)
- Polycera tabescens Risbec, 1928: synonym of Martadoris limaciformis (Eliot, 1908)
- Polycera typica W. Thompson, 1840: synonym of Polycera quadrilineata (O. F. Müller, 1776)
- Polycera varians M. Sars, 1840: synonym of Polycera quadrilineata (O. F. Müller, 1776)
- Polycera webbii d'Orbigny, 1839: synonym of Felimare picta (R. A. Philippi, 1836, 1836)
- Polycera ceylanica Kelaart, 1858: synonym of Plocamopherus ceylonicus (Kelaart, 1858)
- Polycera zosterae O’Donoghue, 1924: synonym of Palio zosterae (O'Donoghue, 1924)

Nomine dubia

- Polycera funerea Pruvot-Fol, 1930
- Polycera pruvotae Risbec, 1953
- Polycera capitata (Alder & Hancock, 1854).
