= Ray Howard-Jones =

British artist (1903–1996)

- Born: 30 May 1903; Lambourn, Berkshire
- Died: 25 June 1996 (aged 93); London
- Education: Slade School of Art; Hospitalfield House
- Known for: Painting, drawing

Rosemary "Ray" Howard-Jones (30 May 1903 – 25 June 1996) was a prolific Welsh painter best known for her impressionistic seascapes and paintings of the coastline of Wales, particularly of the areas around Skomer and Marloes.

== Early life and education ==
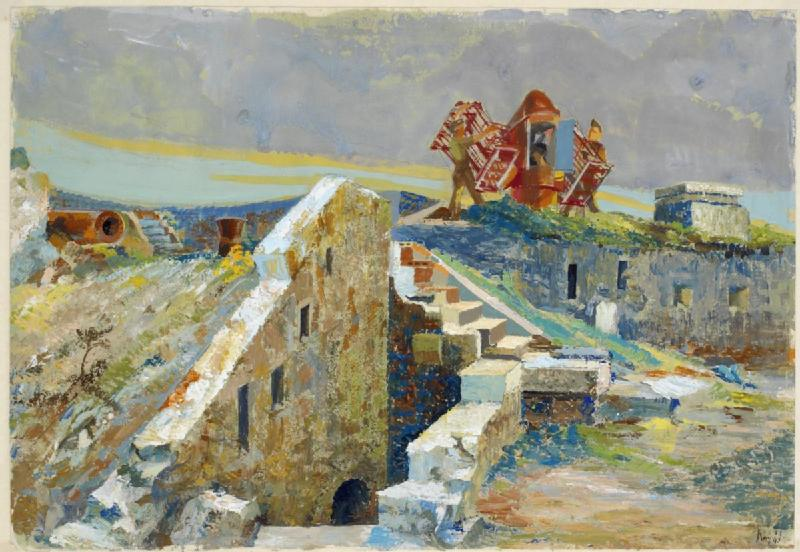
Fortified Islands in the Bristol Channel- 2' Naval Up Projector on an earlier fortification (Art.IWM ART LD3527)

Howard-Jones was born in Lambourn, Berkshire, in 1903. Her father was a vet and racehorse trainer who enlisted in the Royal Army Veterinary Corps during World War I. He served on the Western Front rising to the rank of Colonel but died in 1921 from the effects of a war-time gas attack. Both her parents were Welsh and, after they split up, at the age of two Ray Howard-Jones went to live at her grandfather's house in Penarth. Howard-Jones attended St.Hilda's School in Penarth and then the London Garden School. In 1920, aged seventeen, she entered the Slade School of Art in London, graduating four years later with a Fine Art Diploma that included distinctions in painting, wood engraving and design. She won the Slade's summer composition prize for her oil painting Christ on the Road to Calvary. As a student Howard-Jones created a mural for the headquarters of the Student Christian Movement in Gower Street near the Slade. In 1935, she adopted the name Ray and held her first solo exhibition in 1935 at the Bloomsbury Gallery in London but her art career was interrupted by bad health, first with recurring back pains and later non-pulmonary tuberculosis, which required a prolonged period of recuperation. For a time she worked in a lamp factory, painting designs on lamp shades. She returned to live in Penarth, to organise her grandparents substantial household and arrange their nursing care. In Cardiff Howard-Jones went to work for the National Museum of Wales, providing drawings of archaeological reconstructions for the published works of Sir Cyril Fox and Dr Nash-Williams. She also worked as a designer and creative director for East Moor's Theatre in Splott, near to the Cardiff Docks.

== World War II ==
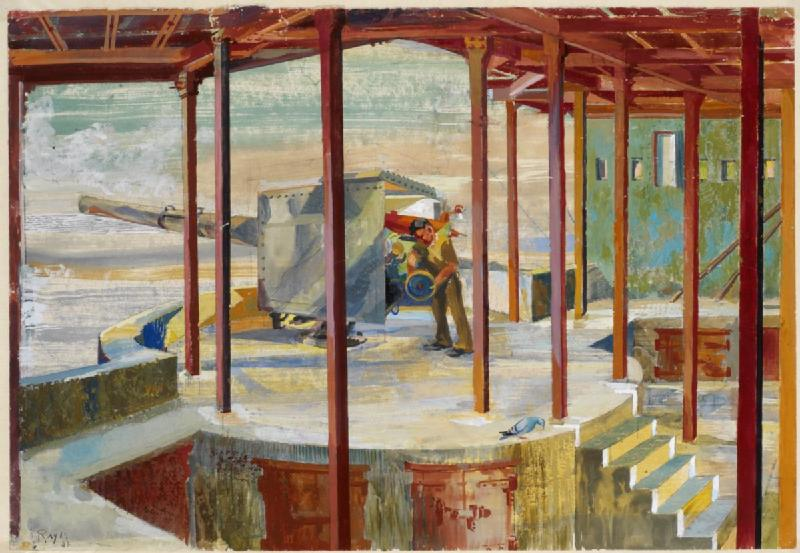
Fortified Islands in the Bristol Channel- 6' Naval gun emplacement, Gallipoli Gun, Steepholm (Art. IWM ART LD3525)

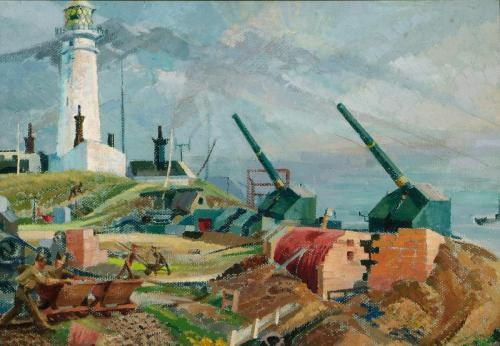
Fortified Islands - Building the North Battery, Flatholm, Bristol Channel (1943), Aberdeen Art Gallery

In July 1942 Howard-Jones submitted 11 drawings to the War Artists' Advisory Committee (WAAC), which were not purchased and indeed were censored for the duration of the conflict. She submitted further drawings in November 1942 and July 1943 which were purchased and led to a commission to produce paintings of the fortifications on the islands of Flat Holm and Steep Holm in the Bristol Channel. Howard-Jones also painted scenes showing the preparations for D-Day taking place around Penarth and the Cardiff Docks. In all WAAC accepted fifteen paintings, including a portrait of her brother, a REME brigadier, to fulfill her commission. These paintings are now held by the Imperial War Museum, the National Army Museum and other British galleries.

== Post-war career ==
In 1946 Howard-Jones spent some time in Scotland at the art school run by James Cowie at Hospitalfield House. A love affair developed between Howard-Jones and Cowie and his nude study of her and her, more abstract, tribute to him are both in the Glasgow Museums collection. Her home in Penarth had been bombed during the war, so in 1947 Howard-Jones moved to a studio at Ravenscourt Park in West London, having spent some time in the area during the war. In 1948 she met the photographer Raymond Moore and, by 1954, they had moved into a Victorian villa in west London, at Ashchurch Park Villas. A work by her was also in the art competition at the 1948 Summer Olympics.

For nine summers, between 1949 and 1958, Howard-Jones and Moore served as the resident caretakers of Skomer Island off the coast of Pembrokeshire. At Skomer, Howard-Jones painted landscapes and seascapes, which are among her best known works. As well as Skomer, Ray-Jones also painted scenes at the Ebbw Vale steel works and also worked as a medical illustrator. In 1958 she was commissioned to design a mosaic for the headquarters of the Western Mail in Cardiff. In 1965 she designed a mosaic altarpiece for the parish church of Marchmont St Giles in Edinburgh. From 1959 Howard-Jones and Moore returned to Pembrokeshire on a regular basis, spending extended periods in a simple cottage at Martin's Haven. After the couple split in 1971, Howard-Jones continued to live at the cottage on her own.

In 1959 Howard-Jones had a solo show at the Leicester Galleries in London. Over the next ten years she was to have five shows there. She also exhibited with the Royal Society of British Artists and with the Royal Cambrian Academy. During the winter of 1963 she held a two-women show with Glenys Cour at the Attic Gallery in Swansea. In all her work featured in almost thirty solo shows in Britain and her work is represented in galleries in both Australia and the United States. The Welsh Arts Council toured two retrospectives of her work, first in 1974 and again in 1983 and 1984. The Rocket Press organised a life-time retrospective of her work in 1993, which Howard-Jones attended and included works she had produced in her late eighties. A volume of her poetry, Heart of the Rock: Poems by Ray Howard-Jones was published at the same time. She had a deep religious faith and, late in her life, took vows as an oblate at an Anglican Benedictine community.

== An Eye for the People ==
Howard-Jones' 1959 mosaic, "An Eye for the People", was created in Italy and installed on Thomson House, Cardiff, after the artist had won a Wales-wide competition in 1958. The 35-feet high mosaic included a giant blue eye which represented the role of the Western Mail newspaper in Wales. After almost 50 years the mosaic and the building were demolished in 2008 before the Twentieth Century Society was able to save it. The Society described it as "one of the finest post-war mosaics in Britain". The only surviving mosaic by Howard-Jones is her 1965 altarpiece in Edinburgh.
