= Marloes =

Village and parish in Pembrokeshire, Wales

Coordinates: 51.73°N 5.19°W

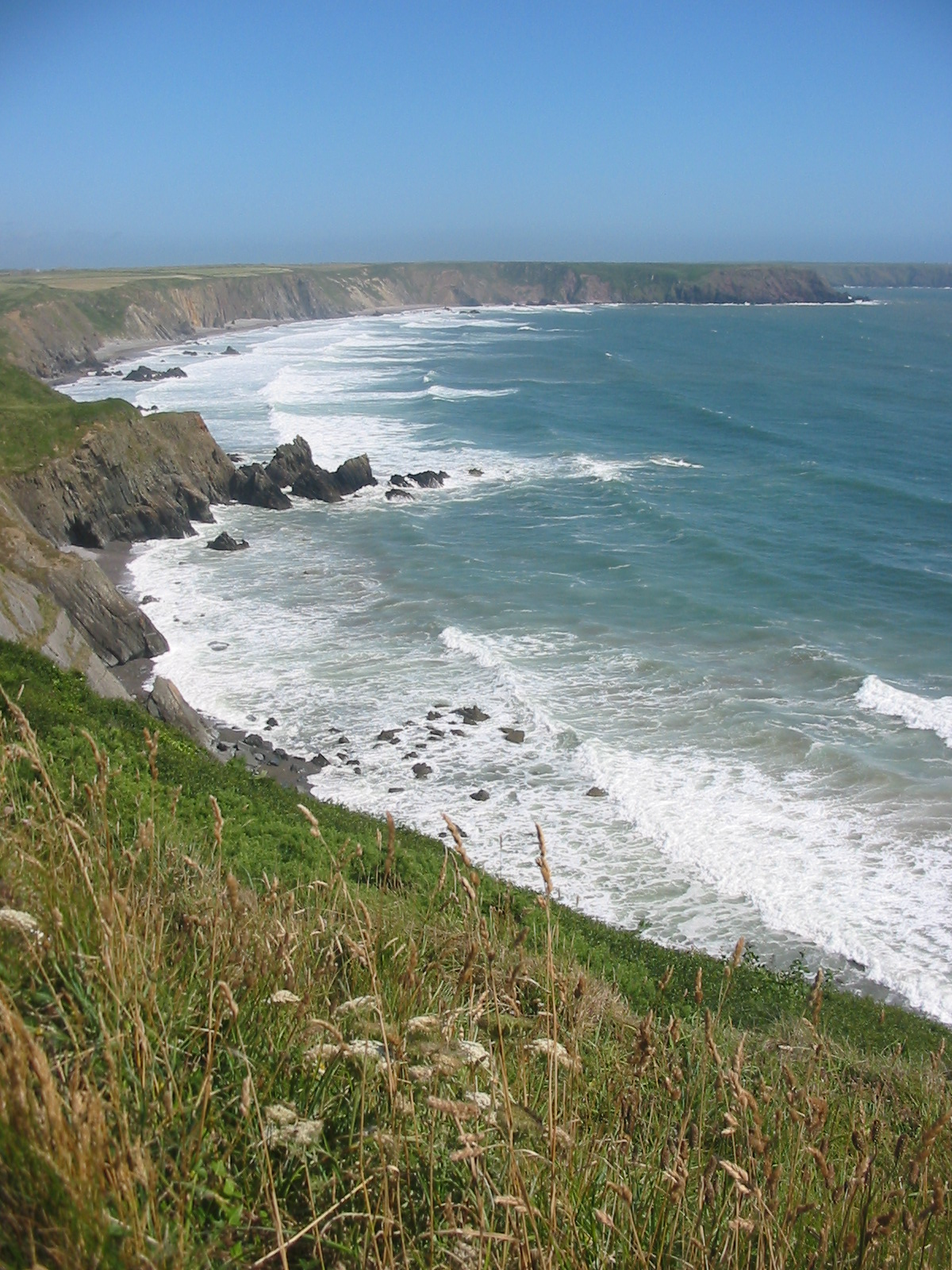
- View from the Pembrokeshire Coast Path on Marloes peninsula

- Location within Pembrokeshire
- Population: 323
- OS grid reference: SM794083
- Community: Marloes and St Brides
- Principal area: Pembrokeshire
- Country: Wales
- Sovereign state: United Kingdom
- Police: Dyfed-Powys
- Fire: Mid and West Wales
- Ambulance: Welsh

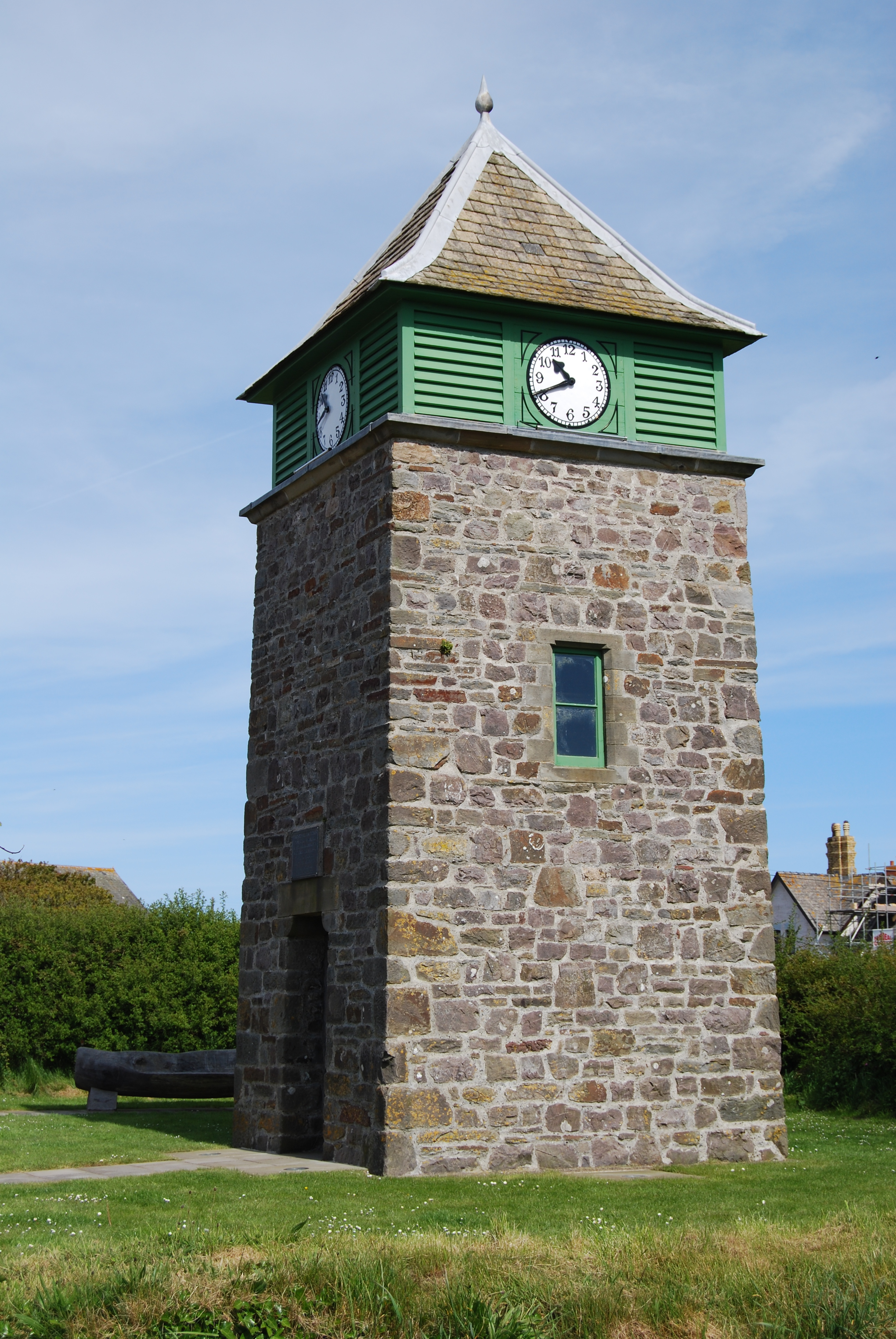
Clock Tower, Marloes

Marloes is a village and parish in Pembrokeshire, Wales, on the Marloes Peninsula 7 miles (11 km) west of Milford Haven and forms the western tip of the southern shore of St Brides Bay. It is within part of the Pembrokeshire Coast National Park. The parish has 6 miles (9.7 km) of mainland coastline accessible throughout by the Pembrokeshire Coast Path and, together with St Brides, constitutes the community of Marloes and St Brides. In 2001, the population was 323.

== Name ==
The name appears to derive from Old Welsh mail 'bare' and ros 'moor' or 'promontory', identical to Melrose in Scotland. It is locally pronounced MAR-loh-z. A part of Little England beyond Wales, it has been essentially English-speaking for 900 years.

== Geography ==
Short video of seals at the Marloes Deer Park

The Marloes Sands beach, located SW from Marloes, is rated as one of the best beaches in Britain but involves a fairly long walk to reach it. The National Trust owns the western half of the peninsula, including the open-access deer park on its western tip, which is a favourite area for picnicking and viewing the wildlife of Skomer Sound, including seals, choughs and puffins. The deer park, which was originally part of the Kensington estate of St Brides, has never actually contained any deer.

Marloes includes the island of Skomer, accessible from Martin's Haven at the tip of the peninsula, and the small islands of Grassholm and Gateholm.

== History ==
Every place in Wales was described by Samuel Lewis in his 1833 book A Topographical Dictionary of Wales. His description of Marloes is as follows:

MARLAIS (MARLOES), a parish in the hundred of RHÔS, county of PEMBROKE, SOUTH WALES, 11 miles (W.S.W.) from Haverfordwest, containing 427 inhabitants. This parish is situated on the southern shore of Muggleswick bay ... It comprises a considerable tract of arable and pasture land, which, with the exception of a comparatively small portion, is enclosed and in a good state of cultivation. The village is principally inhabited by fishermen, who obtain a livelihood in the lobster and crab fisheries, which are carried on here to a considerable extent, and by the sale of leeches, which are found in great numbers in a sheet of water covering from sixty to seventy acres, called Marlais Mere, and which, during the summer months, when it is dry, affords excellent pasturage for cattle... The church, dedicated to St. Peter, is a small edifice, not possessing any architectural details of importance. A former structure, which was dedicated to St. Mary, and situated near the beach, was destroyed by an encroachment of the sea ...

== See also ==
- Skomer Marine Conservation Zone
