= Palio amakusana =

Scientific classification
- Kingdom: Animalia
- Phylum: Mollusca
- Class: Gastropoda
- Order: Nudibranchia
- Family: Polyceridae
- Genus: Palio
- Species: P. amakusana

Binomial name
- Palio amakusana (Baba, 1960)

Species of gastropod

Palio amakusana is a species of sea slug, a nudibranch, a shell-less marine gastropod mollusc in the family Polyceridae.

== Distribution ==
This species was described from Japan.

== Description ==
Palio amakusana is similar in shape to Palio dubia with a high-sided body and small rounded tubercles along the pallial margin. There are slightly smaller white tubercles scattered over the back and sides. It is translucent yellow-orange in colour. There is a prominent, white, extra-brachial appendage on either side of the gills.
