= Palio (disambiguation) =

Palio is the name given in Italy to an annual athletic contest, pitting the neighbourhoods of a town or the hamlets of a comune against each other.

Palio may also refer to:

- Fiat Palio, a supermini car by Fiat
- Palio (1932 film), Italian historical drama film by Alessandro Blasetti
- Palio (2015 film), British documentary film by Cosima Spender
- Palio (gastropod), a genus of sea slugs
