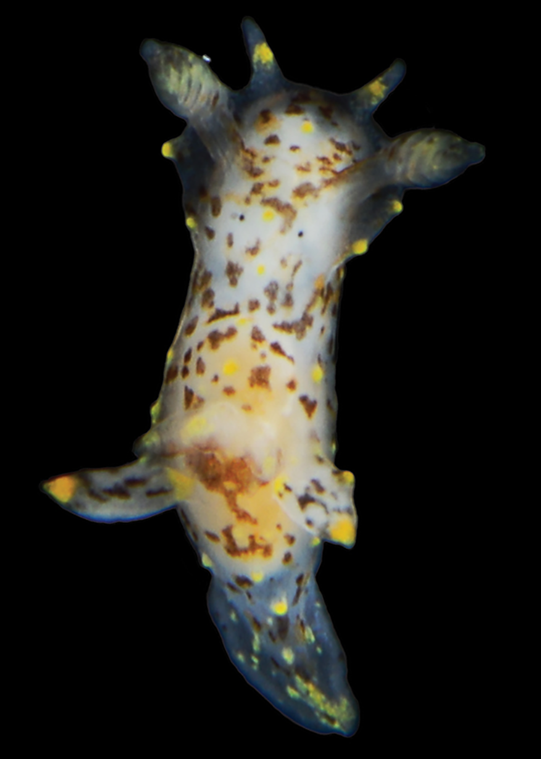

Scientific classification
- Kingdom: Animalia
- Phylum: Mollusca
- Class: Gastropoda
- Order: Nudibranchia
- Family: Polyceridae
- Genus: Polycera
- Species: P. norvegica

Binomial name
- Polycera norvegica Sørensen, Rauch, Pola & Malaquias, 2020

= Polycera norvegica =

Species of gastropod

Polycera norvegica, is a sea slug, a species of dorid nudibranch. It is a marine gastropod mollusc in the family Polyceridae.

== Distribution ==
This nudibranch is described from Norway and DNA-determined from Scotland where it is sympatric with Polycera quadrilineata with which it has previously been confused.

== Description ==
Polycera norvegica is a smooth-bodied nudibranch with two colour morphs. The ground colour is translucent white with yellow or orange tubercles which may unite into lines along the mantle margin and midline of the body. The spotted colour morph has smaller yellow spots and additional black speckles which may partially fuse into brown patches in some individuals. The head has four or occasionally six projections with yellow surface pigmentation which may be reduced to spots of yellow in the speckled morph. The gills and rhinophores are translucent white, tipped with yellow.
