= Gateholm =

Tidal island off the coast of Pembrokeshire, Wales

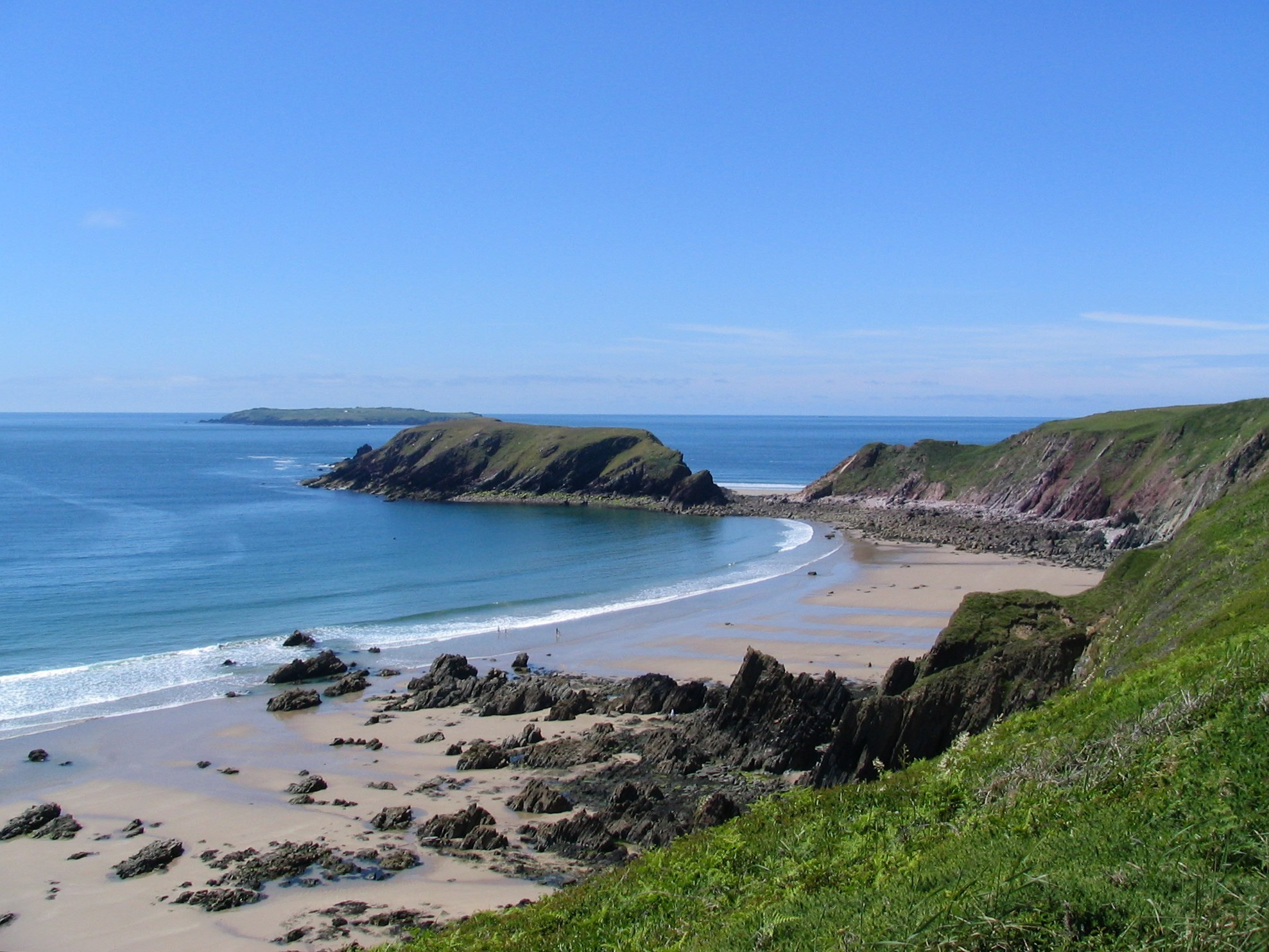
- Gateholm from the north-east. Skokholm is in the distance

- Location within Pembrokeshire

Geography
- Location: Marloes
- Coordinates: 51°43′05″N 5°13′53″W

Administration
- Wales
- County: Pembrokeshire
- Community: Marloes and St Brides

Gateholm or Gateholm Island is a small tidal island off the south west coast of Pembrokeshire, in the community of Marloes and St Brides, in the south west side of Wales, in the west of the UK, and about 8 miles (13 km) west of the port of Milford Haven. It is known for its Romano-British remains. Gateholm is owned by the National Trust as part of their Marloes Sands and Mere estate.

== Name ==
The name, recorded as Goteholme in 1480, derives from Old Norse for "goat island".

== Geography ==
Gateholm is at the western end of Marloes Sands, and is accessible only at low tide. Gateholm rises to a small plateau 40 metres (131 feet) high, and with an area of about 4 hectares (10 acres). The island consists of steeply-dipping Old Red Sandstone. The rock strata date from the Prídolí Epoch of the Silurian; the exceptional exposure here and on the adjoining Albion Sands have resulted in the location's inclusion in the Geological Conservation Review as a candidate for protection as a geological site of special scientific interest (SSSI).

== National Trust and statutory protection ==
Gateholm was bought by the National Trust in 1981 under Enterprise Neptune, a longterm project to acquire and maintain stretches of coastline to retain its character and preserve its wildlife. The National Trust had already been given over 450 acres on Marloes Peninsula, including Marloes Court Farm, donated in 1941, which included the Marloes Sands and Albion Sands coastline. This, along with adjacent donations of West Hook (1940), Runwayskiln Farm (1941) and Trehill Farm (1942), meant the Trust already owned much of the peninsula and its coast. The acquisition in 1981 of Gateholm plus the Martin's Haven deer park at the western headland, meant the entire coastline and peninsula could be managed under National Trust leases and access arrangements. It is now known as 'Marloes Sands and Mere', and incorporates the Marloes Mere inland SSSI as well as parts of two coastal SSSIs, 'Dale and South Marloes Coast', and 'St Brides Bay South', which between them give legal protection to the whole coastline of the Peninsula. The Gateholm coastline also lies within two European designated areas. The 'Pembrokeshire Marine' Special Area of Conservation is notable for its bays, reefs and grey seals, whilst the Special Protection Area for 'Skomer, Skokholm and the seas off Pembrokeshire', gives protection for the large breeding seabird populations.

== Archaeology ==
The island contained around 130 roundhouses as well as huts of a rectangular shape. The rectangular houses were mostly arranged in rows end-on and surrounded by small courtyards. Excavations of some of these hut sites conducted in 1910 and 1930 found evidence for occupation in the Roman period, with finds including pottery, coins, and a small bronze stag. There was also a bronze pin of Irish origin and dating from the 6th century. One of the houses had a stone phallus buried upright in one of the main post holes. The houses were built of turf with stone facings, the roof being carried on a ridge-pole between the posts. The site has been interpreted variously as a native Romano-British settlement with later occupation, and as an early monastic complex.

== Filming ==
Gateholm was the subject of an episode of the British archaeology television series, Time Team (Series 19, episode 01). The island featured prominently in the 2011 film Snow White and the Huntsman; a computer-generated castle was superimposed on the island post-production.
