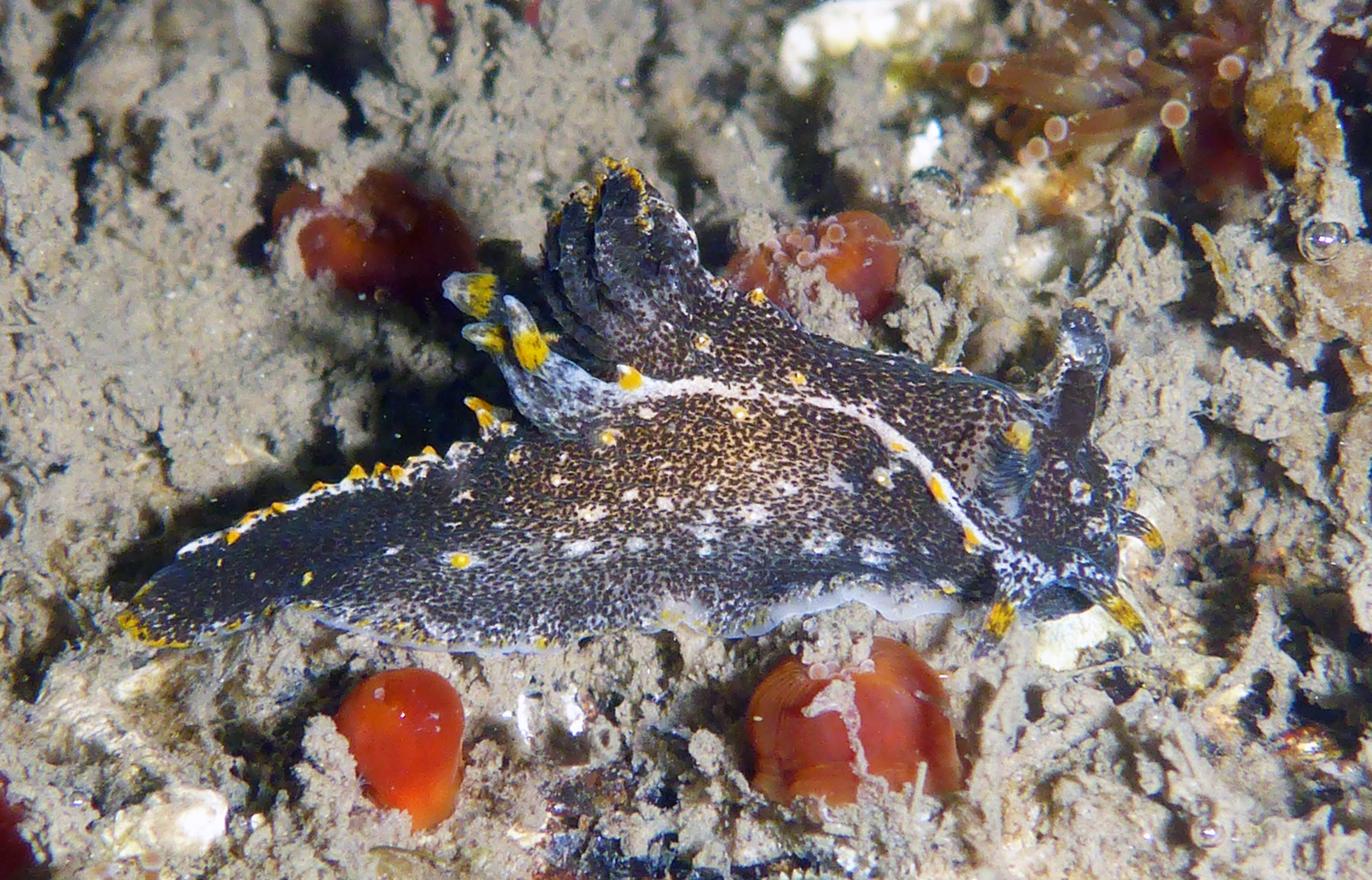

Scientific classification
- Kingdom: Animalia
- Phylum: Mollusca
- Class: Gastropoda
- Order: Nudibranchia
- Family: Polyceridae
- Genus: Polycera
- Species: P. hedgpethi

Binomial name
- Polycera hedgpethi Er. Marcus, 1964

= Polycera hedgpethi =

Species of gastropod

Polycera hedgpethi, common name Hedgpeth's dorid, is a species of nudibranch, a shell-less marine gastropod mollusc in the family Polyceridae. It is a widely distributed species of unknown origin, but considered invasive in many parts of its range.

== Distribution ==
Polycera hedgpethi is widely distributed in temperate and subtropical waters worldwide, but it remains a cryptogenic species with an uncertain native range.

Polycera hedgpethi was first described from California, US, and it occurs commonly in the northeast Pacific, including in Mexico and Panama. It is also widely distributed in Australia, with an expanding range along the east coast. Polycera hedgpethi also occurs in Costa Rica, New Zealand, Morocco, Angola, South Africa, Japan, South Korea, and northern Spain, as well as in the Mediterranean Sea. It is considered invasive in Oceania, Africa, and the Mediterranean

In both hemispheres P. hedgpethi occupies a latitudinal range of approximately 7-45˚, likely restricted primarily by sea temperatures. It is often associated with ports and other anthropogenic structures, and is believed to have been transported around the world via vessel biofouling. The distribution of P. hedgpethi is still expanding, with its dispersal seemingly driven by human transport and facilitated by climate change.

== Ecology ==
Polycera hedgpethi feeds primarily on the bryozoans Bugula neritina, which is also a widely distributed invasive. Despite its expanding range and invasive status, P. hedgpethi is generally considered to be a benign invader, having no negative ecological impacts on recipient ecosystems.
