= Polycera manzanilloensis =

Scientific classification
- Kingdom: Animalia
- Phylum: Mollusca
- Class: Gastropoda
- Order: Nudibranchia
- Family: Polyceridae
- Genus: Polycera
- Species: P. manzanilloensis

Binomial name
- Polycera manzanilloensis Ortea, Espinosa & Camacho, 1999

Species of gastropod

Polycera manzanilloensis is a species of sea slug, a nudibranch, a shell-less marine gastropod mollusc in the family Polyceridae.

== Distribution ==
This species was described from Manzanillo, Limón, Caribbean coast of Costa Rica.
