= Polycera tricolor =

Scientific classification
- Kingdom: Animalia
- Phylum: Mollusca
- Class: Gastropoda
- Order: Nudibranchia
- Family: Polyceridae
- Genus: Polycera
- Species: P. tricolor

Binomial name
- Polycera tricolor Robilliard, 1971

Species of gastropod

Polycera tricolor, commonly known as the three-color polycera, is a species of sea slug, a nudibranch, a shell-less marine gastropod mollusc in the family Polyceridae. It occurs in the Pacific Northwest, ranging from southern Alaska southward to northern Mexico, at depths down to about 60 m (200 ft).

== Description ==
This nudibranch grows to a length of about 2 cm (0.8 in). The basic colour is pale, translucent bluish-white. The five to eleven frontal appendages, and the four to six extra-branchial appendages, the rhinophores and the gills all have black bases, yellow transverse bands and white tips. A yellow stripe runs along the midline of the back towards the tip of the tail and there is sometimes another yellow line that rims the margin of the foot.

== Distribution ==
Polycera tricolor is native to the northeastern Pacific Ocean. Its range extends from Southern Alaska and British Columbia to Baja California and northern Mexico, and its depth range is down to about 60 m (200 ft).

== Ecology ==
Nudibranchs in this family feed almost exclusively on bryozoans. Having no shell to protect them from predation, nudibranchs secrete various defensive chemicals from glands on their surface. Many secrete sulfuric acid, and it is known that fish have a great dislike of acidic tastes. Polycera tricolor contains a novel alkene-containing diacylguanidine. In this species, the chemical defences are secreted by glands mostly found in the dorsal papillae, the part of the animal a predator might encounter first. If these papillae get eaten or damaged, they can readily be regenerated.
