= Polycera chilluna =

Scientific classification
- Kingdom: Animalia
- Phylum: Mollusca
- Class: Gastropoda
- Order: Nudibranchia
- Family: Polyceridae
- Genus: Polycera
- Species: P. chilluna

Binomial name
- Polycera chilluna Er. Marcus, 1961

Synonyms
- ? Polycera aurantiomarginata García Gómez & Bobo, 1984

Species of gastropod

Polycera chilluna is a species of sea slug, a nudibranch, a marine gastropod mollusk in the family Polyceridae.

== Distribution ==
Polycera chilluna was described from a single specimen collected in North Carolina. It has been reported from that area and a little further south. It is possibly a senior synonym of Polycera aurantiomarginata from Spain and west Africa.
