= Polycera abei =

Scientific classification
- Kingdom: Animalia
- Phylum: Mollusca
- Class: Gastropoda
- Order: Nudibranchia
- Family: Polyceridae
- Genus: Polycera
- Species: P. abei

Binomial name
- Polycera abei (Baba, 1960)

Synonyms
- Greilada abei Baba, 1960

Species of gastropod

Polycera abei is a species of sea slug, a nudibranch, a marine gastropod mollusk in the family Polyceridae.

== Distribution ==
This species of polycerid nudibranch was described from Japan.

== Description ==
The body of Polycera abei is translucent yellowish-white. The entire back and sides are covered with moderate sized black spots and fewer, slightly larger, orange spots. The oral veil has six tapering black-tipped papillae.
