= Polycera odhneri =

Scientific classification
- Kingdom: Animalia
- Phylum: Mollusca
- Class: Gastropoda
- Order: Nudibranchia
- Family: Polyceridae
- Genus: Polycera
- Species: P. odhneri

Binomial name
- Polycera odhneri Er. Marcus, 1955

Species of gastropod

Polycera odhneri is a species of sea slug, a nudibranch, a shell-less marine gastropod mollusc in the family Polyceridae.

== Distribution ==
This species was described from São Paulo, Brazil. It has been reported from Lake Worth Lagoon, Florida, USA.
