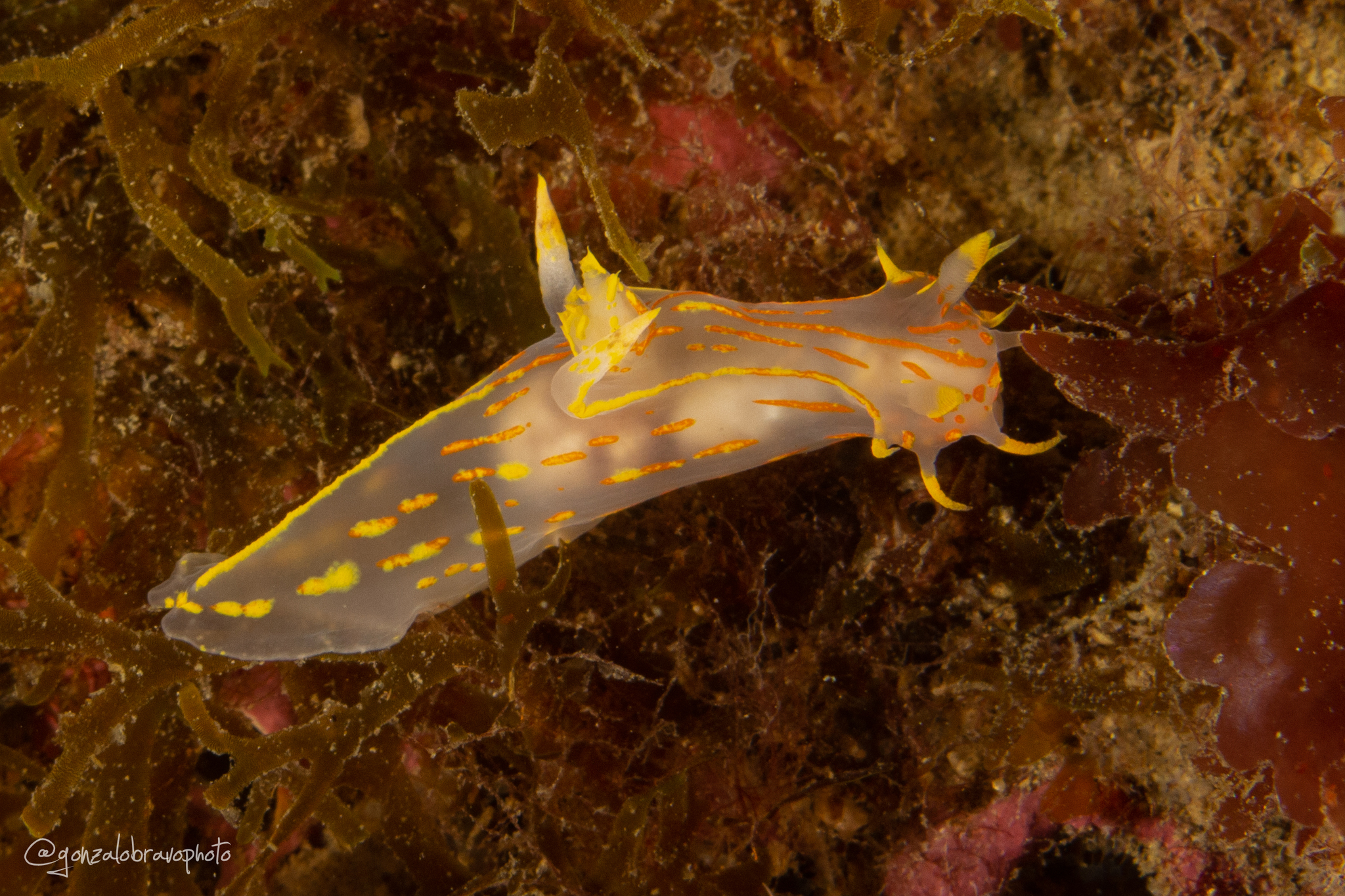
- Polycera marplatensis

Scientific classification
- Kingdom: Animalia
- Phylum: Mollusca
- Class: Gastropoda
- Order: Nudibranchia
- Family: Polyceridae
- Genus: Polycera
- Species: P. marplatensis

Binomial name
- Polycera marplatensis Franceschi, 1928

= Polycera marplatensis =

Species of gastropod

Polycera marplatensis is a species of sea slug, a nudibranch, a shell-less marine gastropod mollusc in the family Polyceridae.

== Distribution ==
This species was described from Mar del Plata, Buenos Aires, Argentina, 38°2′11″S 57°31′37″W. It has been reported from Brazil to Patagonia.

== Ecology ==
Polycera marplatensis is common in the intertidal zone where it feeds on the Bryozoan Bugula sp..
