= Polycera kaiserae =

Scientific classification
- Kingdom: Animalia
- Phylum: Mollusca
- Class: Gastropoda
- Order: Nudibranchia
- Family: Polyceridae
- Genus: Polycera
- Species: P. kaiserae

Binomial name
- Polycera kaiserae Hermosillo & Valdés, 2007

Species of gastropod

Polycera kaiserae is a species of sea slug, a nudibranch, a shell-less marine gastropod mollusc in the family Polyceridae.

== Distribution ==
This species was described from Bahía de Banderas, Mexico.

== Description ==
Polycera kaiserae has a pink body covered with white spots. The oral veil processes, pedal corners, branchial plumes, rhinophores, extrabranchial appendages and tail all have navy blue coloration followed by white at the tips.
