= Polycera melanosticta =

Scientific classification
- Kingdom: Animalia
- Phylum: Mollusca
- Class: Gastropoda
- Order: Nudibranchia
- Family: Polyceridae
- Genus: Polycera
- Species: P. melanosticta

Binomial name
- Polycera melanosticta M. C. Miller, 1996

Species of gastropod

Polycera melanosticta is a species of sea slug, a nudibranch, a shell-less marine gastropod mollusc in the family Polyceridae.

== Distribution ==
This species was described from ten specimens collected from underneath a paint raft at Devonport Naval Base, Waitemata Harbour, Auckland, New Zealand.

== Ecology ==
Polycera melanosticta feeds on Bugula neritina and Bugula stolonifera.
