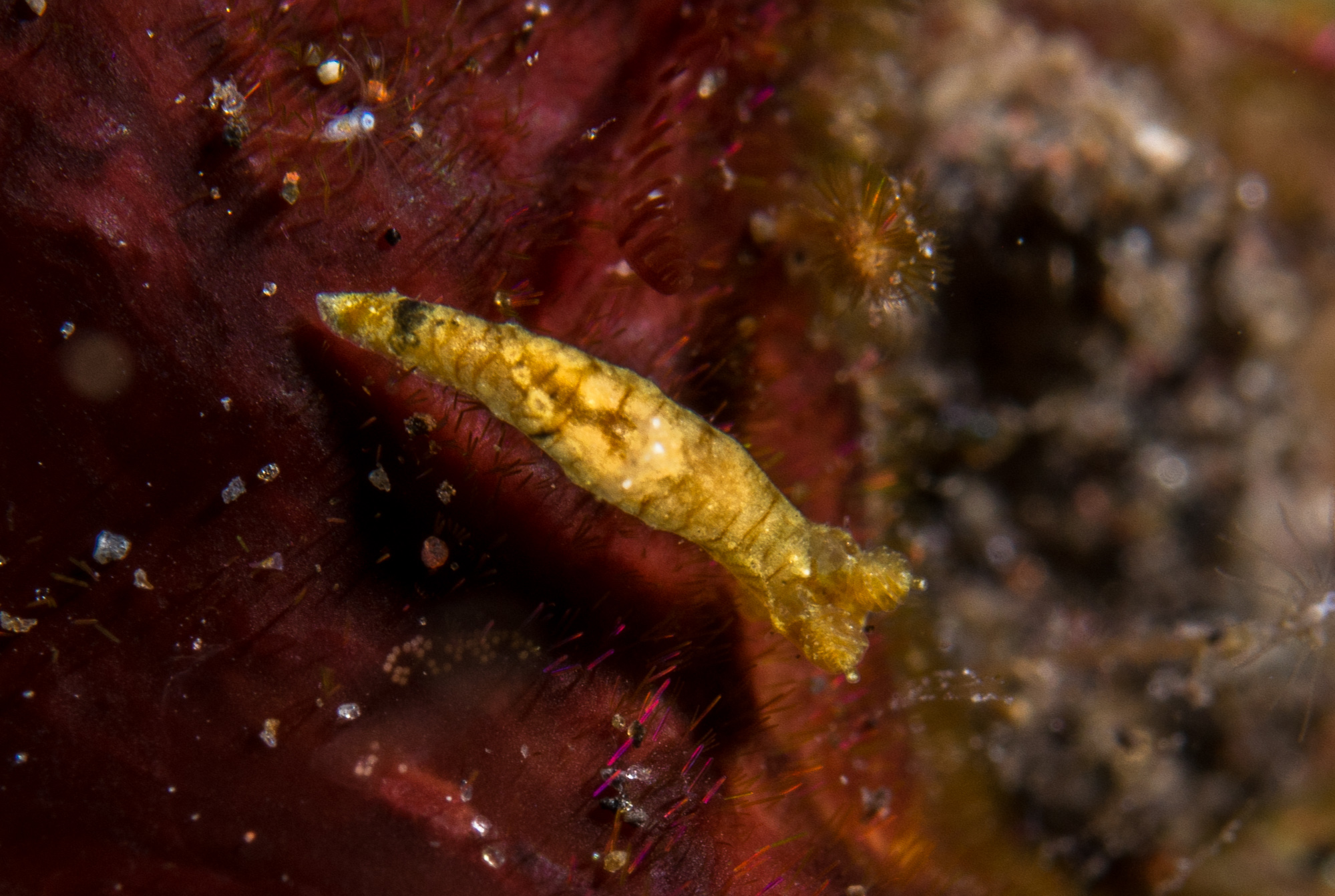
- Alam Batu, Bali.

Scientific classification
- Kingdom: Animalia
- Phylum: Mollusca
- Class: Gastropoda
- Order: Nudibranchia
- Family: Polyceridae
- Genus: Polycera
- Species: P. risbeci

Binomial name
- Polycera risbeci Odhner, 1941

= Polycera risbeci =

Species of gastropod

Polycera risbeci is a species of sea slug, a nudibranch, a shell-less marine gastropod mollusc in the family Polyceridae.

== Distribution ==
This species is found in the central Indo-Pacific region.
