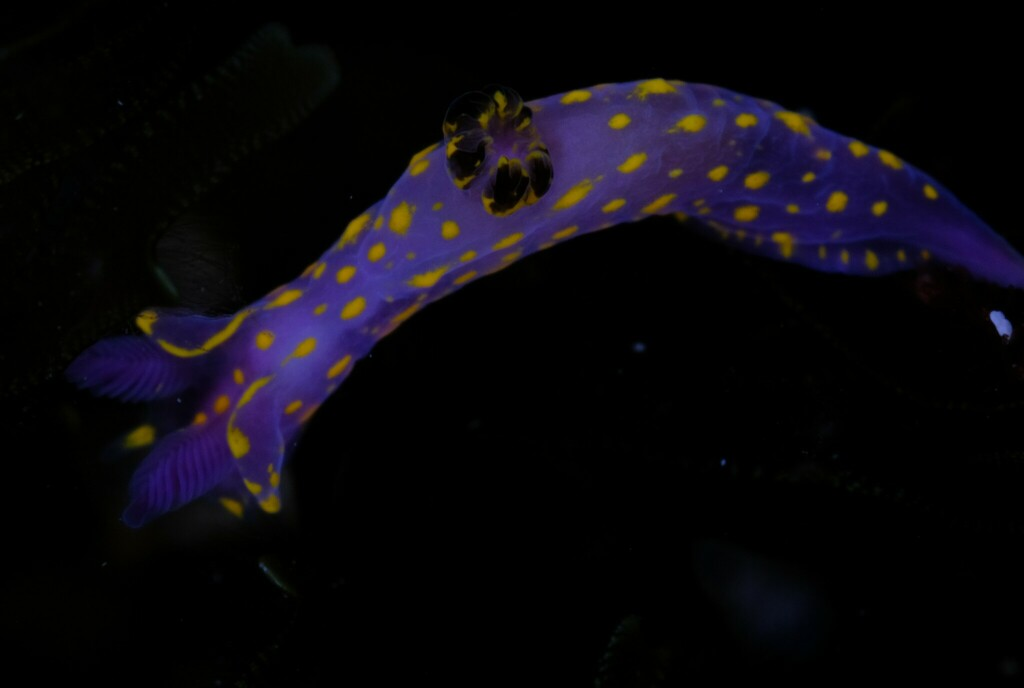

Scientific classification
- Kingdom: Animalia
- Phylum: Mollusca
- Class: Gastropoda
- Order: Nudibranchia
- Family: Polyceridae
- Genus: Polycera
- Species: P. janjukia

Binomial name
- Polycera janjukia Burn, 1962

= Polycera janjukia =

Species of gastropod

Polycera janjukia is a species of sea slug, a nudibranch, a shell-less marine gastropod mollusc in the family Polyceridae.

== Distribution ==
This species was described from Victoria, Australia. It also occurs in New South Wales and Tasmania.
