= Polycera anae =

Scientific classification
- Kingdom: Animalia
- Phylum: Mollusca
- Class: Gastropoda
- Order: Nudibranchia
- Family: Polyceridae
- Genus: Polycera
- Species: P. anae

Binomial name
- Polycera anae Pola, Sánchez-Benítez & Ramiro, 2014

Species of gastropod

Polycera anae is a species of sea slug, a nudibranch, a marine gastropod mollusc in the family Polyceridae.

== Distribution ==
This species of polycerid nudibranch was described from Rocas Tiburon off Isla Brincano, Panama, Pacific Ocean. The original description also includes specimens from the Pacific Ocean coast of Costa Rica. In Mexico and southern California this species is replaced by a similar species, Polycera alabe. Genetic evidence suggests that other species exist in the area, but these have not yet been named.

== Description ==
The body of Polycera anae is mottled brown or black with raised orange spots forming broken lines along the back and sides. There are pale brown conical tubercles along the notal margin. The oral veil has 4 conical papillae which are pale brown and the gills have pale brown tips. The rhinophore clubs are a similar colour. This is a small species, growing to 5 mm in length.
