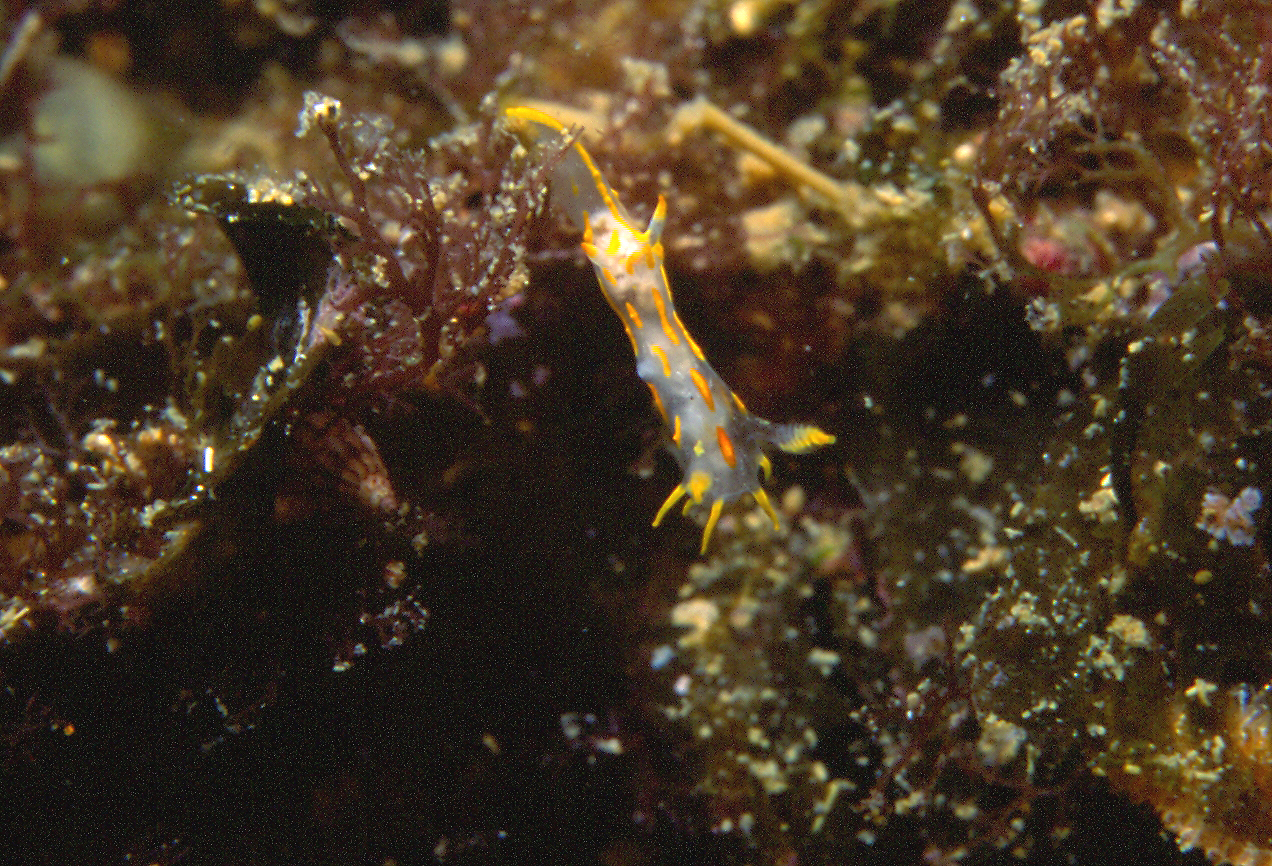
- Polycera quadrilineata from France

Scientific classification
- Kingdom: Animalia
- Phylum: Mollusca
- Class: Gastropoda
- Order: Nudibranchia
- Family: Polyceridae
- Genus: Polycera
- Species: P. quadrilineata

Binomial name
- Polycera quadrilineata (O. F. Müller, 1776)

Synonyms
- Doris cornuta Rathke, 1806; Doris flava Montagu, 1804; Doris marplatensis Franceschi, 1928; Doris quadrilineata O.F. Müller, 1776; Polycera lineatus Risso, 1826; Polycera mediterranea Bergh, 1879; Polycera nigrolineata Dautzenberg & Durouchoux, 1913; Polycera nigropicta Ihering, 1885; Polycera ornata d'Orbigny, 1837; Polycera salamandra Labbé, 1931; Polycera typica W. Thompson, 1840; Polycera varians M. Sars, 1840; Thecacera capitata Alder & Hancock, 1854

= Polycera quadrilineata =

Species of gastropod

Polycera quadrilineata, is a sea slug, a species of dorid nudibranch. It is a marine gastropod mollusc in the family Polyceridae. The specific epithet quadrilineata means four-lined and refers to the four longitudinal black lines present on the original specimen. This species is sometimes called the fourline nudibranch. In 2020 a integrative molecular and morphological study showed that P. quadrilineata was a complex of two species in the NE Atlantic and one of these species was given the new name Polycera norvegica.

== Distribution ==
This nudibranch was described originally from Norway. In the NE Atlantic it is a common species in shallow water. It is distributed from Greenland to Norway and south along the European coasts into the Mediterranean Sea. It is found from the intertidal zone to 160 m.

It has also been reported off the South African coast from the Atlantic coast of the Cape Peninsula to Algoa Bay. The South African animals differ in having six instead of four papillae projecting from the frontal margin of the head, plus details of the coloration. These animals have been shown to be an undescribed species by studies in 2014 and 2020.

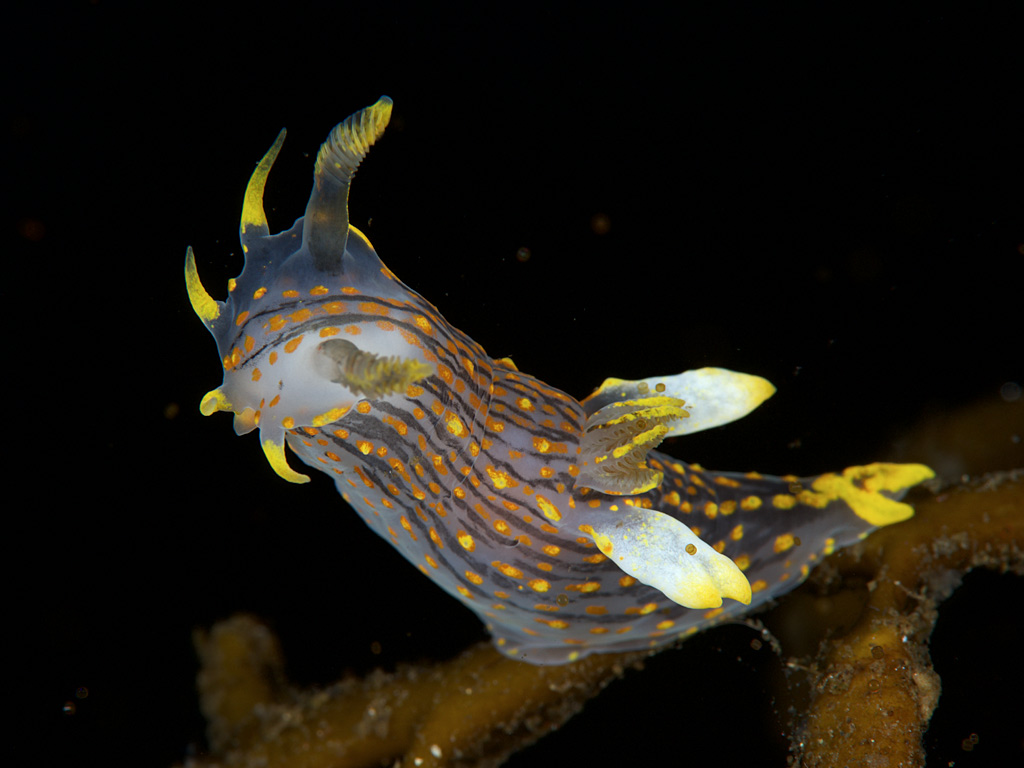
The nudibranch Polycera quadrilineata, Gulen Dive Resort, Norway.

== Description ==
Polycera quadrilineata is a smooth-bodied, variably coloured nudibranch. The ground colour is white or grey and there are usually black, yellow or orange stripes longitudinally along the notum, though these can be absent. The head has four or occasionally six yellow projections. The gills and rhinophores are translucent white, tipped with yellow. There are two processes at the sides of the gill cluster with glandular, orange or yellow pigmented tips matching the general orange or yellow colour of the body pigmentation.

In the South African animals the gills and rhinophores are black, and may be spotted with yellow. Alongside the gills is a pair of yellow-tipped projections. The animal may reach 20mm in total length. It is distinguished from the crowned nudibranch in having raised yellow spots on the mid-dorsal region.

== Ecology ==
Polycera quadrilineata feeds mostly on the bryozoans Membranipora membranacea and Electra pilosa.
