= Polycera picta =

Scientific classification
- Kingdom: Animalia
- Phylum: Mollusca
- Class: Gastropoda
- Order: Nudibranchia
- Family: Polyceridae
- Genus: Polycera
- Species: P. picta

Binomial name
- Polycera picta Risbec, 1928.

Species of gastropod

Polycera picta is a species of sea slug, a nudibranch, a shell-less marine gastropod mollusc in the family Polyceridae.

== Distribution ==
This species was described from pointe de l'Artillerie, Nouméa, New Caledonia, 22.283965°S 166.432516°E.
