= Marloes Sands =

Beach in Wales

Coordinates: 51.72119°N 5.20891°W

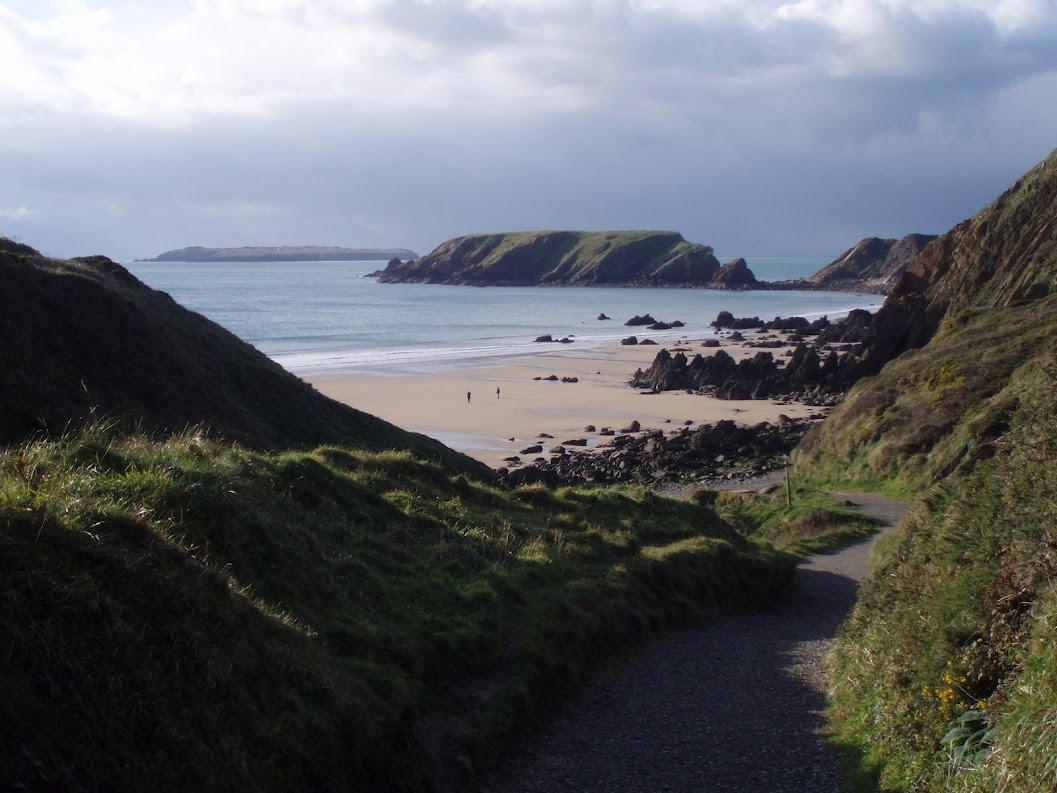
Marloes Sands beach

Marloes Sands (Welsh: Traeth Marloes) is an approx. 1.5 kilometres (0.93 mi) long remote sandy beach in Pembrokeshire, Wales, near the village of Marloes. It's broadly curved and surrounded by cliffs. Walking on the beach gives great views of Skokholm Island and Gateholm Island.

== Location and access ==
The beach is located SW from the Marloes village and there is a National Trust car-park nearby (charge per day or free for National Trust members). There is a track that leads from the main road to the beach. There is a disused World War II Royal Air Force airfield RAF Dale, above the south-east cliffs of the beach. There are approximately three accesses to the beach which become very useful if you get caught by the tide coming in. Besides the main access from Runwayskiln, there is also access to the north, near Gateholm Island, that requires some scrambling over the rocks and another access to the south that has steps leading to the midsection of the beach.

== Geology ==
The surrounding cliffs are layered with red sandstone and grey shale. A feature of the beach is the Three Chimneys, three vertical lines of hard silurian sandstone and mudstone. There used to be four chimneys, but the fourth crumbled in a severe storm of 1954.

== Filming location ==
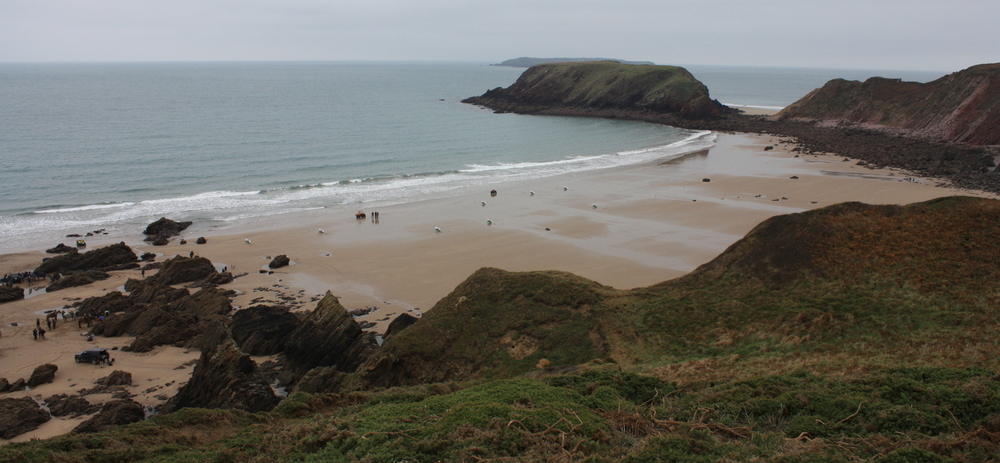
The Marloes Sands beach at the filming of Snow White and the Huntsman

Marloes Sands was the filming location for:

- Snow White & the Huntsman (September 2011).
- The Lion in Winter (1968).
