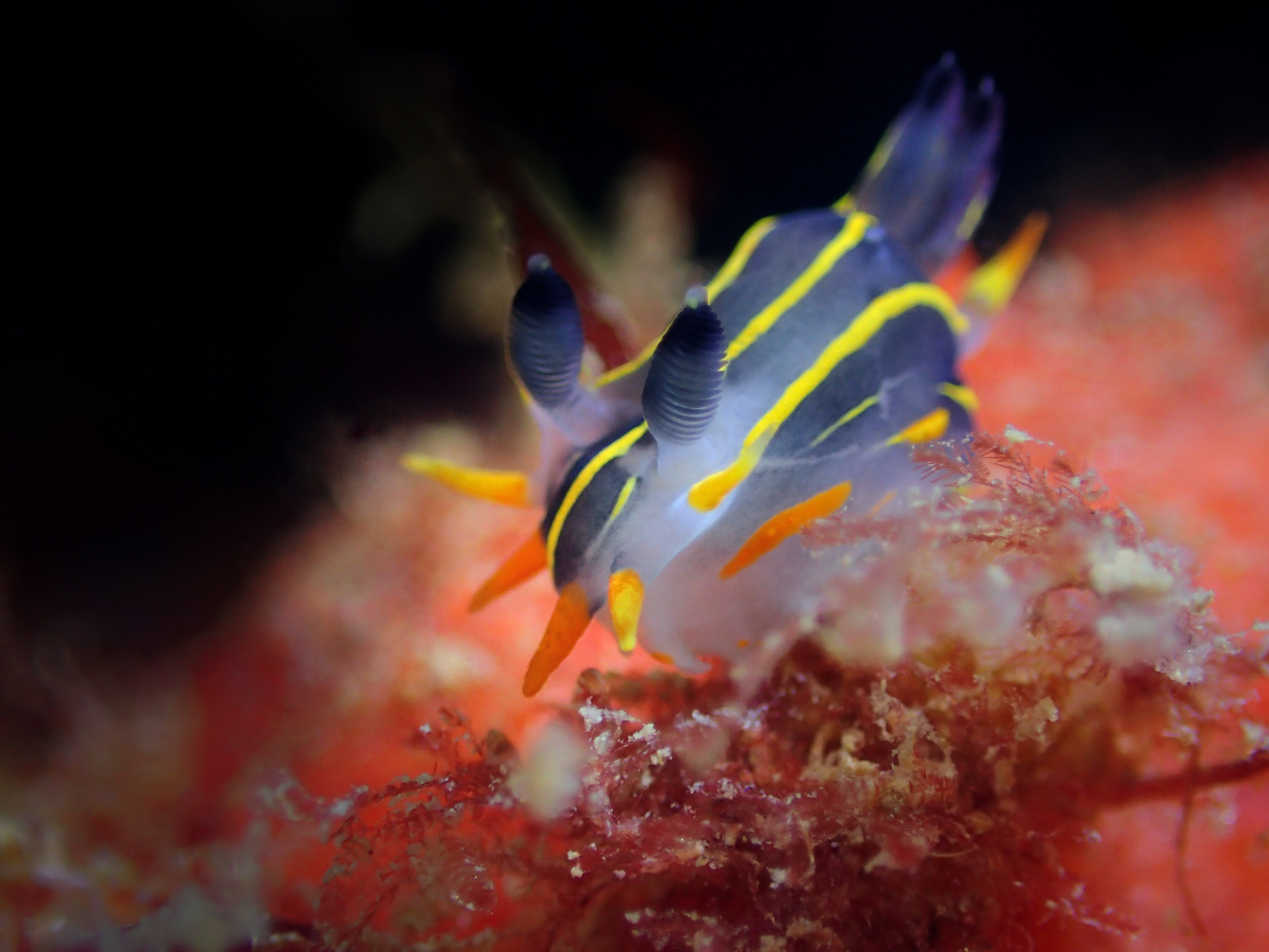

Scientific classification
- Kingdom: Animalia
- Phylum: Mollusca
- Class: Gastropoda
- Order: Nudibranchia
- Family: Polyceridae
- Genus: Polycera
- Species: P. aurantiomarginata

Binomial name
- Polycera aurantiomarginata García Gómez & Bobo, 1984

Synonyms
- ? Polycera chilluna Marcus, 1957

= Polycera aurantiomarginata =

Species of gastropod

Polycera aurantiomarginata is a species of sea slug, a nudibranch, a marine gastropod mollusk in the family Polyceridae.

== Distribution ==
This species of polycerid nudibranch was described from Spain. It is found on the west African coast as far south as Angola. It may be synonymous with the western Atlantic species Polycera chilluna.

== Description ==
The body of Polycera aurantiomarginata is dark grey or black white with longitudinal yellow lines. The oral veil has six tapering yellow-tipped papillae. There is a broad orange line at the lower edge of the foot.

== Ecology ==
Polycera aurantiomarginata feeds on a bryozoan.
