= Polycera aurisula =

Scientific classification
- Kingdom: Animalia
- Phylum: Mollusca
- Class: Gastropoda
- Order: Nudibranchia
- Family: Polyceridae
- Genus: Polycera
- Species: P. aurisula

Binomial name
- Polycera aurisula Marcus, 1957

Species of gastropod

Polycera aurisula is a species of sea slug, a nudibranch, a marine gastropod mollusk in the family Polyceridae.

== Distribution ==
This species of polycerid nudibranch was described from Brazil. It is found on the American coast as far north as Florida.

== Description ==
The body of Polycera aurisula is translucent white with small brown spots densely covering the back and sides. The oral veil has 4-6 tapering papillae which are white with a yellow band near the base, a dark blue band at the midpoint and a light blue tip.

== Ecology ==
Polycera aurisula feeds on the bryozoan Amathia distans Busk, 1886.
