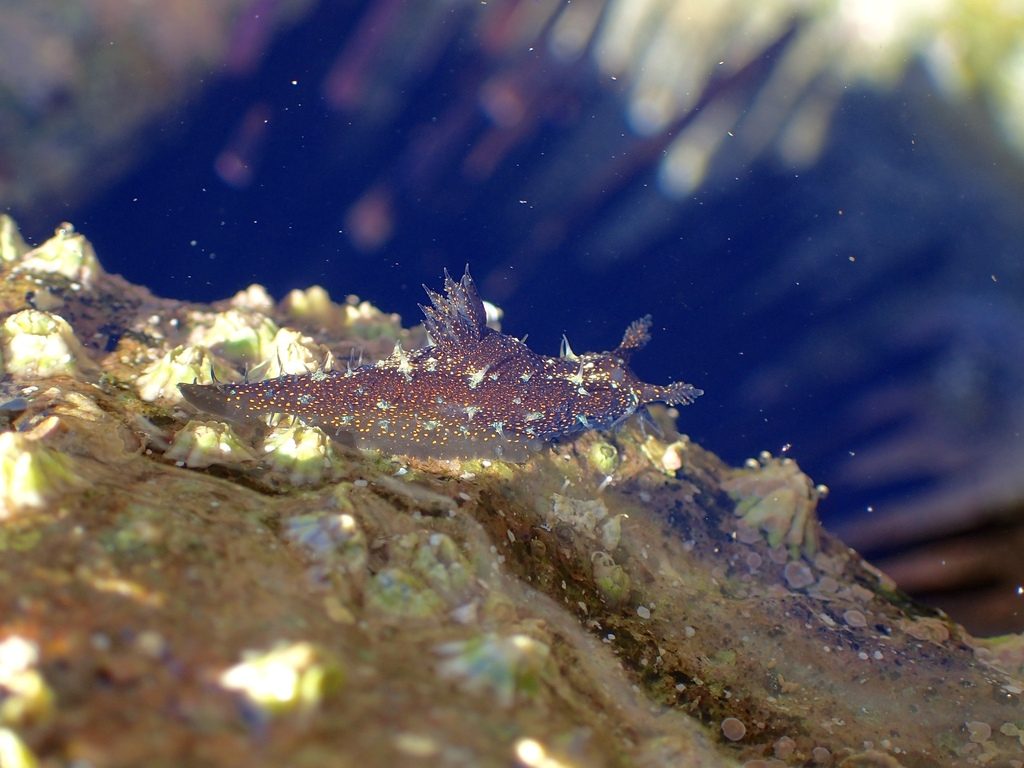

Scientific classification
- Kingdom: Animalia
- Phylum: Mollusca
- Class: Gastropoda
- Order: Nudibranchia
- Family: Polyceridae
- Genus: Polycera
- Species: P. alabe

Binomial name
- Polycera alabe Collier & Farmer, 1964

= Polycera alabe =

Species of gastropod

Polycera alabe is a species of sea slug, a nudibranch, a marine gastropod mollusc in the family Polyceridae.

== Distribution ==
This species of polycerid nudibranch was described from the southeast side of Isla de Cedros, Baja California, Mexico. The species appears to be confined to Mexico and southern California, being replaced by a similar species, Polycera anae further south in Costa Rica and Panama.

== Description ==
The body of Polycera alabe is black with raised orange spots covering the back and sides. The oral veil has 4 tapering papillae which are either dark grey or white and the gills and rhinophores are black with a few orange spots.
