= Palio gracilis =

Scientific classification
- Kingdom: Animalia
- Phylum: Mollusca
- Class: Gastropoda
- Order: Nudibranchia
- Family: Polyceridae
- Genus: Palio
- Species: P. gracilis

Binomial name
- Palio gracilis (Pease, 1871)

Species of gastropod

Palio gracilis is a species of sea slug, a nudibranch, a shell-less marine gastropod mollusc in the family Polyceridae.

== Distribution ==
This species was described from Huaheine, Society Islands as Triopa gracilis.
