= Polycera maculata =

Scientific classification
- Kingdom: Animalia
- Phylum: Mollusca
- Class: Gastropoda
- Order: Nudibranchia
- Family: Polyceridae
- Genus: Polycera
- Species: P. maculata

Binomial name
- Polycera maculata Pruvot-Fol, 1951

Synonyms
- Palio maculata (Pruvot-Fol, 1951)

Species of gastropod

Polycera maculata is a species of sea slug, a nudibranch, a shell-less marine gastropod mollusc in the family Polyceridae.

== Distribution ==
This species was described from a single specimen dredged offshore of Marseille, Mediterranean Sea.
