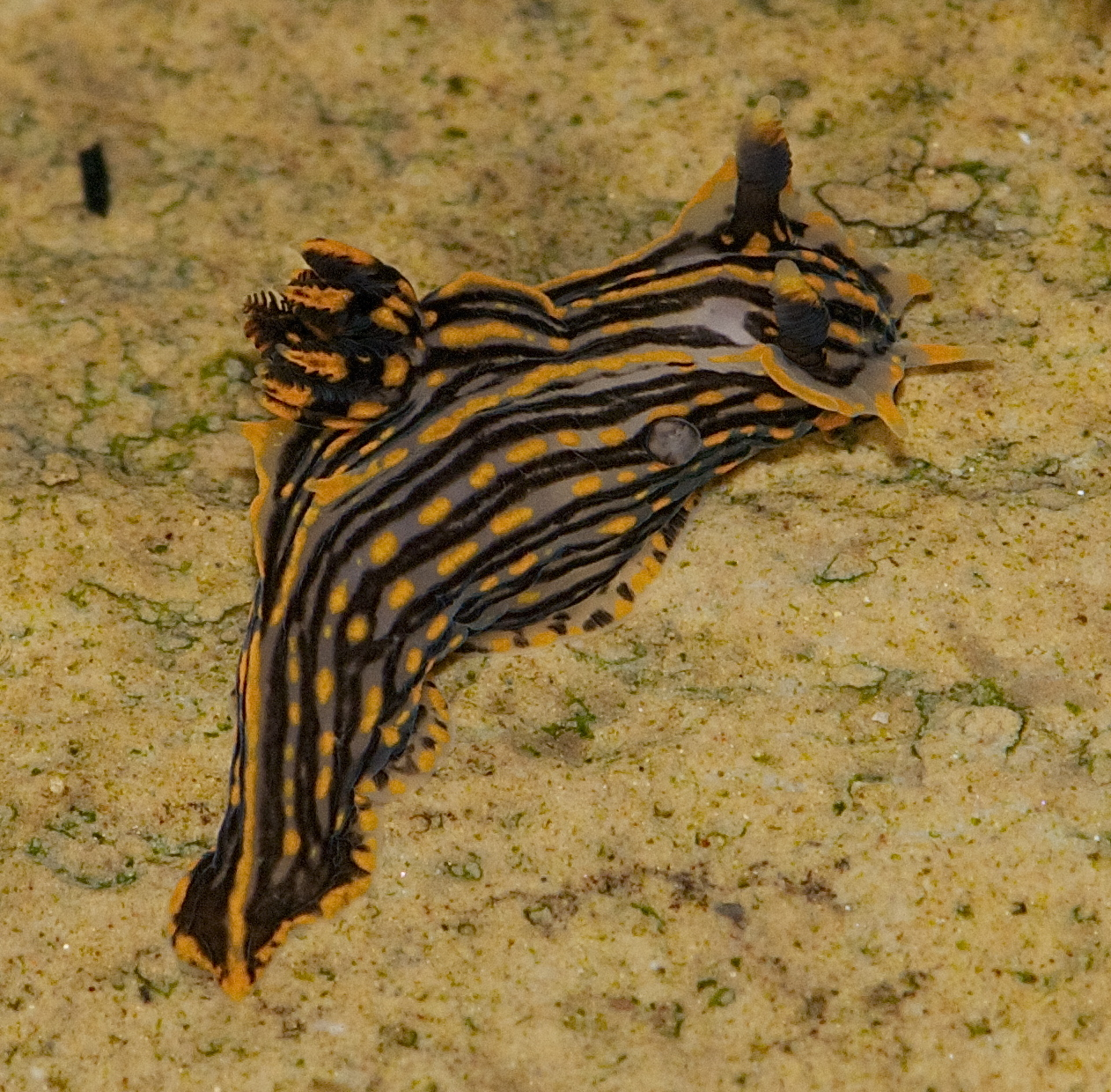

Scientific classification
- Kingdom: Animalia
- Phylum: Mollusca
- Class: Gastropoda
- Order: Nudibranchia
- Family: Polyceridae
- Genus: Polycera
- Species: P. atra

Binomial name
- Polycera atra (MacFarland, 1905)

= Polycera atra =

Species of gastropod

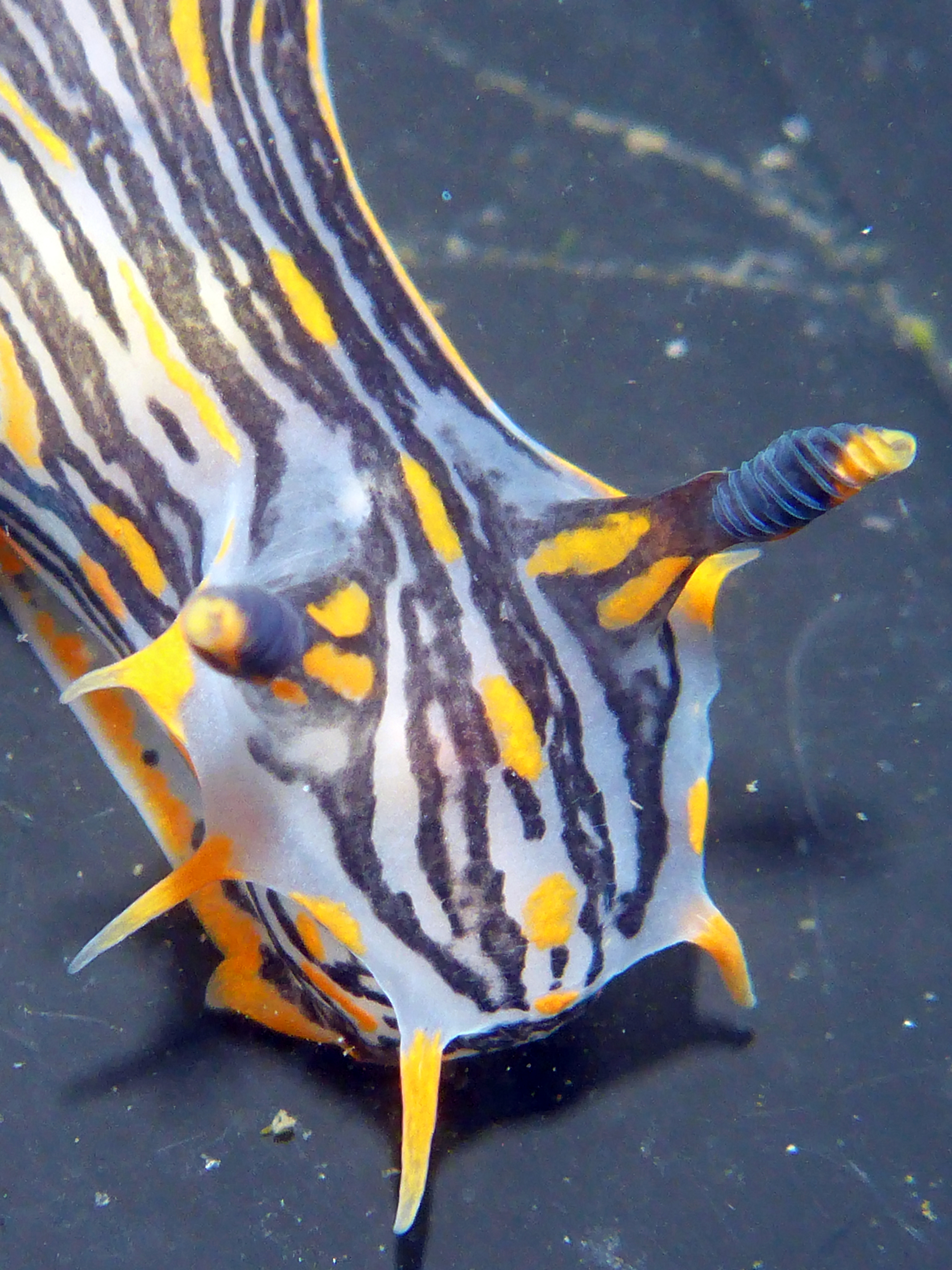
Polycera atra from Princeton Harbor, California

Polycera atra, common name orange-spike polycera or sorcerer's sea slug, is a species of sea slug, a nudibranch, a marine gastropod mollusk in the family Polyceridae.

== Distribution ==
This species of polycerid nudibranch was described from California.

== Description ==
The body of Polycera atra is translucent white with longitudinal black lines interspersed with rows of raised yellow spots. The oral veil has 4-8 tapering yellow-tipped papillae.

== Ecology ==
Polycera atra feeds on the bryozoan Bugula.
