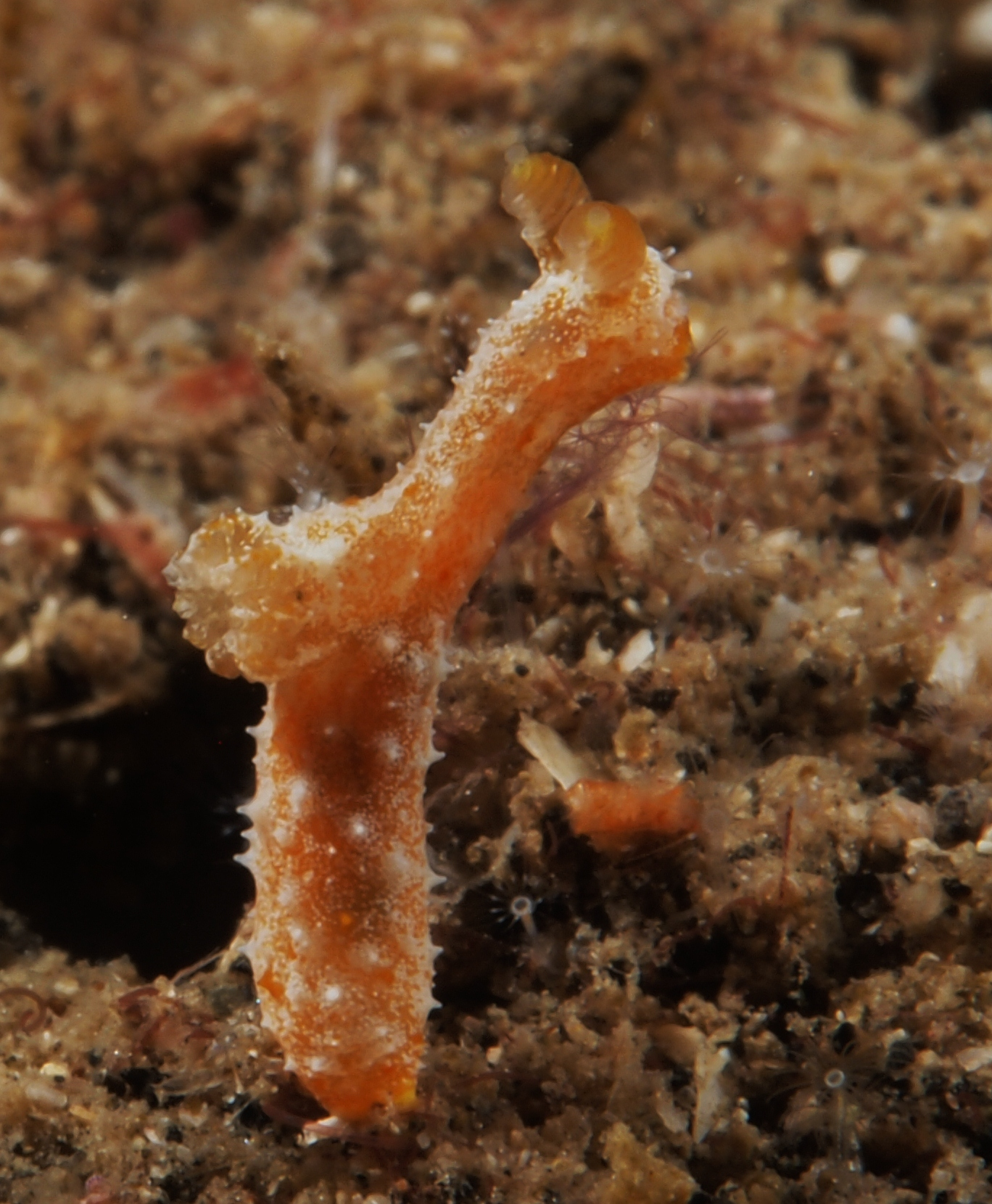

Scientific classification
- Kingdom: Animalia
- Phylum: Mollusca
- Class: Gastropoda
- Order: Nudibranchia
- Family: Polyceridae
- Genus: Polycera
- Species: P. japonica

Binomial name
- Polycera japonica Baba, 1949

= Polycera japonica =

Species of gastropod

Polycera japonica is a species of sea slug, a nudibranch, a shell-less marine gastropod mollusc in the family Polyceridae.

== Distribution ==
This species was described from Japan. It also occurs in Hawaii and is widely distributed in the Indo-Pacific region.
