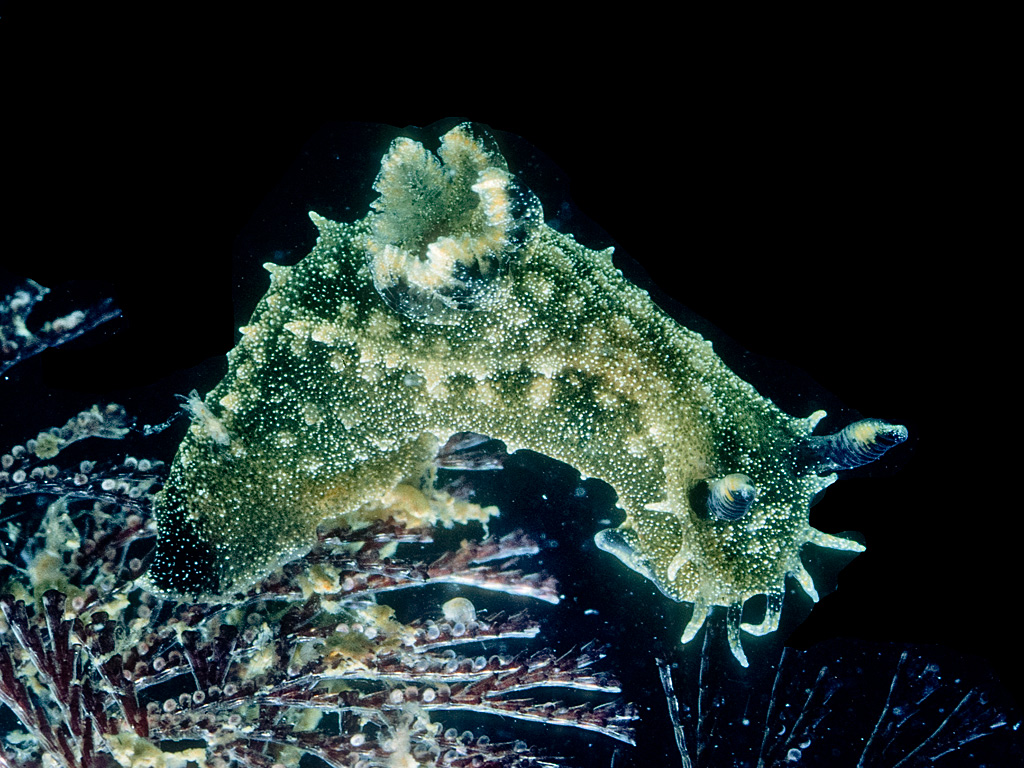
- The nudibranch Polycera fujitai, Mirs Bay, Hong Kong.

Scientific classification
- Kingdom: Animalia
- Phylum: Mollusca
- Class: Gastropoda
- Order: Nudibranchia
- Family: Polyceridae
- Genus: Polycera
- Species: P. fujitai

Binomial name
- Polycera fujitai Baba, 1937

Synonyms
- Palio fujitai (Baba, 1937)

= Polycera fujitai =

Species of gastropod

Polycera fujitai is a species of sea slug, a nudibranch, a shell-less marine gastropod mollusc in the family Polyceridae.

== Distribution ==
This species was described from Japan. It also occurs in Hong Kong, in the South China Sea and has been reported from New Zealand.
