= Polycera xicoi =

Scientific classification
- Kingdom: Animalia
- Phylum: Mollusca
- Class: Gastropoda
- Order: Nudibranchia
- Family: Polyceridae
- Genus: Polycera
- Species: P. xicoi

Binomial name
- Polycera xicoi Ortea & Rolán 1989

Species of gastropod

Polycera xicoi is a species of sea slug, a nudibranch, a shell-less marine gastropod mollusc in the family Polyceridae.

== Distribution ==
This species was described from Cape Verde.
