= Polycera rycia =

Scientific classification
- Kingdom: Animalia
- Phylum: Mollusca
- Class: Gastropoda
- Order: Nudibranchia
- Family: Polyceridae
- Genus: Polycera
- Species: P. rycia

Binomial name
- Polycera rycia Er. Marcus & Ev. Marcus, 1970

Species of gastropod

Polycera rycia is a species of sea slug, a nudibranch, a shell-less marine gastropod mollusc in the family Polyceridae.

== Distribution ==
This species was described from Biscayne Bay, Florida. It has been reported from Cuba.
