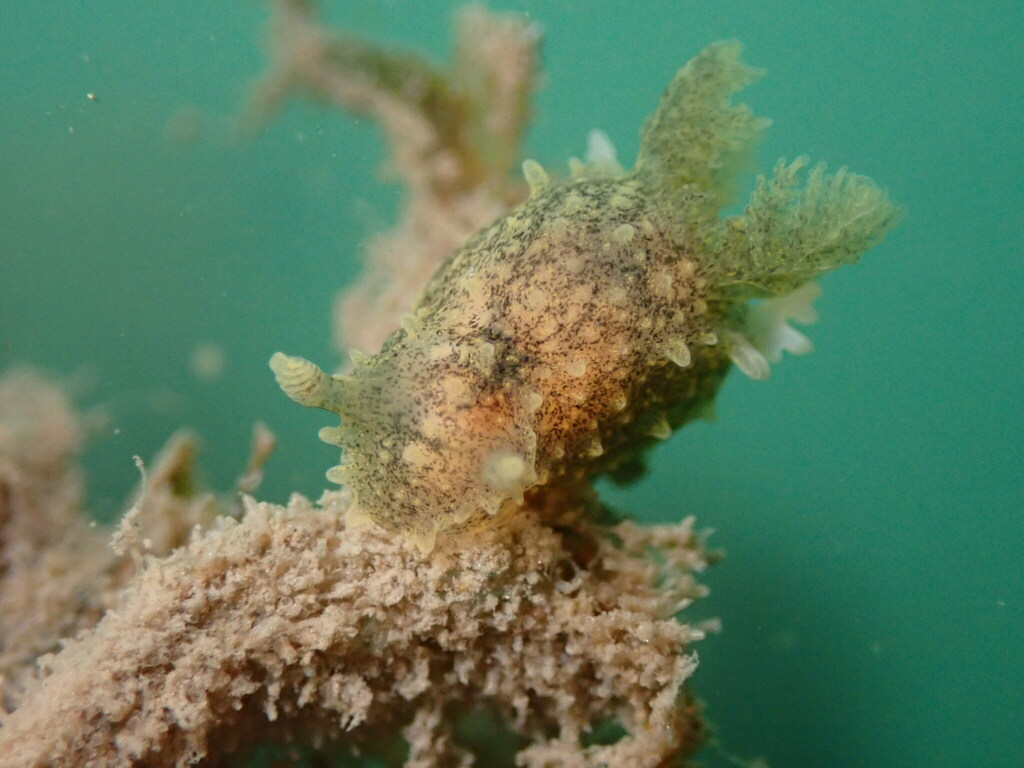

Scientific classification
- Kingdom: Animalia
- Phylum: Mollusca
- Class: Gastropoda
- Order: Nudibranchia
- Family: Polyceridae
- Genus: Palio
- Species: P. zosterae

Binomial name
- Palio zosterae (O'Donoghue, 1924)

= Palio zosterae =

Species of gastropod

Palio zosterae is a species of sea slug, a nudibranch, a shell-less marine gastropod mollusc in the family Polyceridae.

== Distribution ==
This species was described from Vancouver Island, British Columbia, Canada. It is found from Vancouver Island to Bodega Bay, California.

== Ecology ==
Palio zosterae feed on the bryozoans Bowerbankia gracilis and Membranipora membranacea.
