= St Brides Bay =

Bay in Pembrokeshire, West Wales

Coordinates: 51.81°N 5.23°W

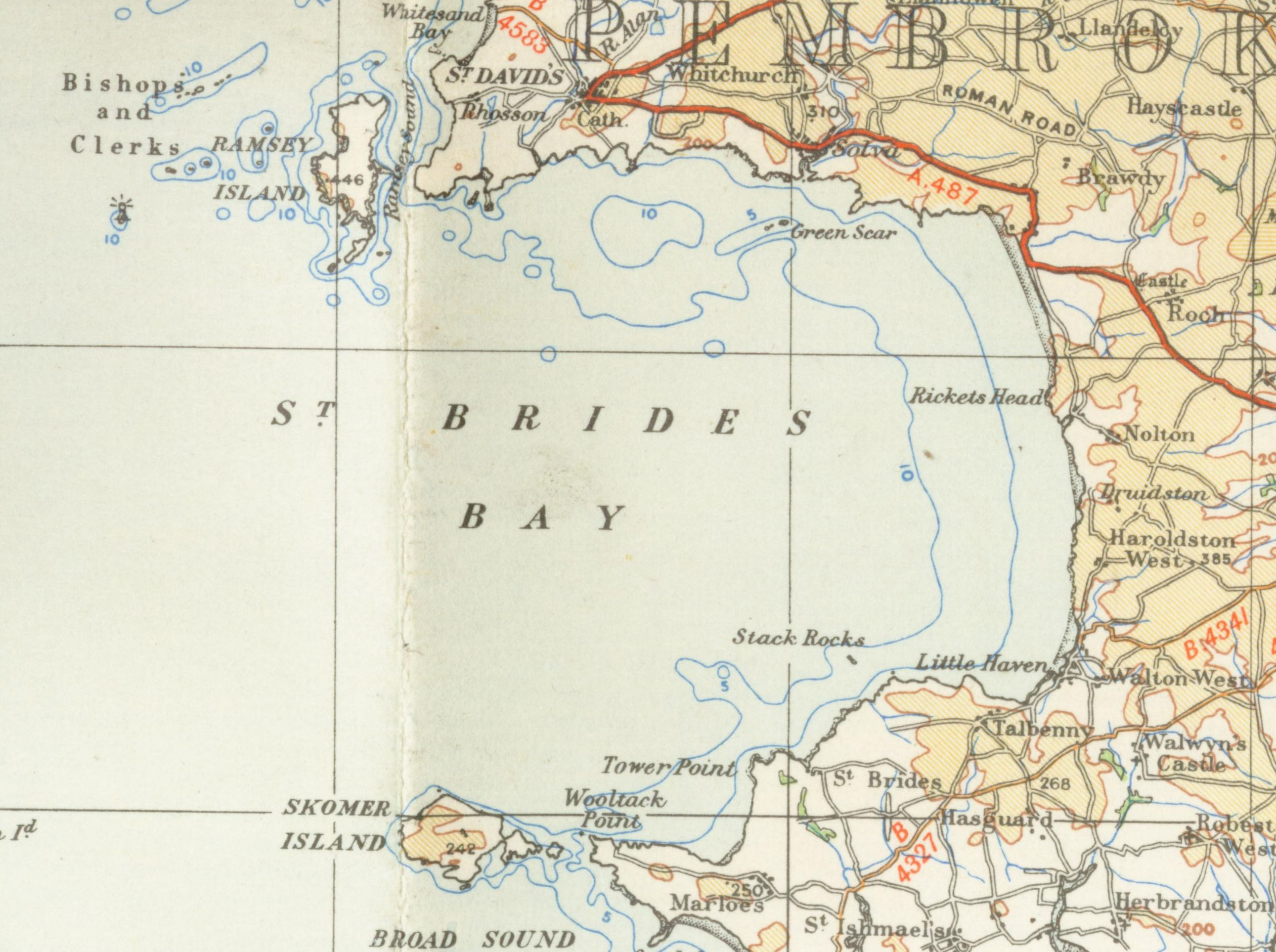
Map of St Bride's Bay made in 1946

St Brides Bay (Welsh: Bae Sain Ffraid) is a bay in western Pembrokeshire, West Wales.

Either Skomer Island or the mainland extremity of Wooltack Point at the western end of the Marloes Peninsula marks the southern limit of the bay whilst its northern limit is marked by Ramsey Island off St David's Head. The mouth of the bay is about 7 miles (11 km) wide and extends some 10 miles (16 km) eastwards from this line.

== Geology ==
The northern and southern shores of the bay are mainly rocky in nature, backed by cliffs up to 250 feet (76 m) high. Its eastern shore comprises a series of large and small sandy beaches between rocky sections.

The geological exposures around the bay reveal great complexity with considerable folding and faulting of the strata. The cliffs of its southern shore are formed from sandstones of Ordovician and Devonian age together with a suite of both intrusive and extrusive igneous rocks, some of which are Precambrian in age. Those in the north comprise a series of Precambrian and Cambrian age rocks of both sedimentary and igneous origin. In contrast, the eastern shore is formed from the more readily eroded rocks of Carboniferous age. These are largely the sandstones and mudstones of the Coal Measures but include a small section of shales and sandstones assigned to the Millstone Grit Series. Contorted coal seams within the Coal Measures were once worked though the Pembrokeshire Coalfield was never of major economic importance.

== Designations ==
The coast surrounding it forms a part of the Pembrokeshire Coast National Park which was designated in 1951 in recognition of the outstanding quality of its landscape. Much of the coastline is also defined as heritage coast. The whole of St Bride's Bay along with adjoining areas of sea around the Pembrokeshire Coast is protected under European environmental law as a special area of conservation (or 'SAC'). Parts of the coast are additionally defined as special protection areas (or 'SPAs'). There are also three or four sites of special scientific interest (or 'SSSIs') around its perimeter.

== Villages and amenities ==
The bay's coast is dotted with small villages including St Brides, Martin's Haven, Little Haven, Broad Haven, Nolton Haven, Newgale and Solva, whilst Britain's smallest city, St David's lies nearby. The Pembrokeshire Coast Path follows its entire coastline.

It is well known among residents and tourists for fishing.
