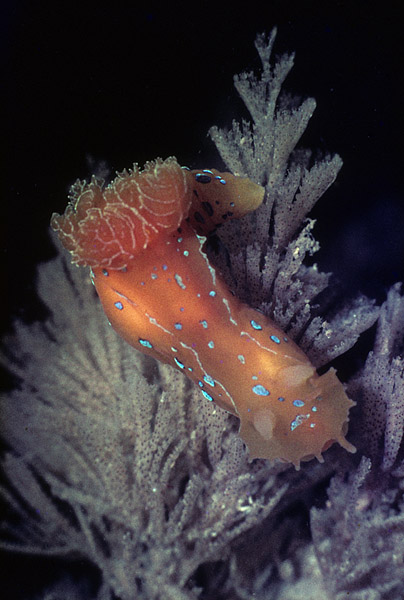
- A live individual of Polycera elegans from Skomer Marine Nature Reserve, Wales, UK

Scientific classification
- Kingdom: Animalia
- Phylum: Mollusca
- Class: Gastropoda
- Order: Nudibranchia
- Family: Polyceridae
- Genus: Polycera
- Species: P. elegans

Binomial name
- Polycera elegans Bergh, 1894

Synonyms
- Greilada elegans Bergh, 1894; Palio espagnoli Tejedo, 1994; Polycera elegans (Bergh, 1894) accepted, alternate representation; Polycera atlantica Pruvot-Fol, 1956; Polycera messinensis Odhner, 1941

= Polycera elegans =

Species of gastropod

Polycera elegans is a species of sea slug, a nudibranch, a shell-less marine gastropod mollusc in the family Polyceridae.

== Distribution ==
This species occurs from southern England and Wales, south along coasts of the Atlantic to the Mediterranean Sea. It is found in the Canary Islands and as far east as Italy in the Mediterranean Sea.

== Description ==
This polycerid nudibranch is translucent orange with large iridescent blue spots. There is a tracery of blue-green iridescence along the pallial margin and on the midribs of the gills.
