= Polycera maddoxi =

Scientific classification
- Kingdom: Animalia
- Phylum: Mollusca
- Class: Gastropoda
- Order: Nudibranchia
- Family: Polyceridae
- Genus: Polycera
- Species: P. maddoxi

Binomial name
- Polycera maddoxi M. C. Miller, 2005

Species of gastropod

Polycera maddoxi is a species of sea slug, a nudibranch, a shell-less marine gastropod mollusc in the family Polyceridae.

== Distribution ==
This species was described from two specimens collected in 1997 on a jetty piling at Port Taranaki, New Zealand. A specimen was photographed in 1988 at Hapuka Rock, Sugar Loaf Islands by David Maddox, who also collected the type specimen. It has also been reported from the Poor Knights Islands.
