= Polycera herthae =

Scientific classification
- Kingdom: Animalia
- Phylum: Mollusca
- Class: Gastropoda
- Order: Nudibranchia
- Family: Polyceridae
- Genus: Polycera
- Species: P. herthae

Binomial name
- Polycera herthae Ev. Marcus & Er. Marcus, 1963

Species of gastropod

Polycera herthae is a species of sea slug, a nudibranch, a shell-less marine gastropod mollusc in the family Polyceridae.

== Distribution ==
This species was described from Curacao and Antigua. It also occurs in Cuba, Florida, Costa Rica and the Bahamas.
