= Polycera nimbsi =

- Polycera nimbsi, paratype, Sandy Beach, New South Wales, Australia

Scientific classification
- Kingdom: Animalia
- Phylum: Mollusca
- Class: Gastropoda
- Order: Nudibranchia
- Family: Polyceridae
- Genus: Polycera
- Species: P. nimbsi

Binomial name
- Polycera nimbsi Pola, Miguel-González & Paz-Sedano, 2023

Species of sea slug

Polycera nimbsi is a species of sea slug, a nudibranch, a shell-less marine gastropod mollusc in the family Polyceridae. It is known only from southern Australia. Type material was collected by SCUBA and described in 2023.

== Taxonomy ==
Polycera nimbsi was described in 2023 by Marta Pola, María Miguel-González and Sofía Paz-Sedano, together with two other new species of polycerid nudibranch: Palio gaeli from the Marshall Islands and Paliota galactica, the type species of the newly erected genus Paliota, from Australia. The type material was collected in New South Wales between 2014 and 2017.

== Etymology ==
The specific name honours the Australian molecular biologist Dr Matt Nimbs, who collected and photographed the type material.

== Description ==
Polycera nimbsi is a small species; the preserved type specimens measured 4–6 mm. The body is elongated and limaciform, appearing wrinkled owing to numerous small conical tubercles, and the margin of the notum bears a low crest with medium-sized, pointed tubercles. The front of the head is expanded into a veil bearing 4–6 elongated processes, and the oral tentacles are small. The rhinophores are perfoliate, with nine lamellae. Five or six bipinnate gill branches, the central one the longest, surround the anus in a semi-circle and cannot be retracted into a pocket; the species lacks the extra-branchial appendages found in many other polycerids.

Two colour morphs are known. In one, the animal is beige with a brownish marbled pattern extending onto the velar processes, oral tentacles and gill branches, with dark gill lamellae that are yellowish above and dense, bright white spots on the notum. In the other, the animal is orange to pale brown with minute bright white spots, while the velar processes, oral tentacles, outer sides of the gill branches, most of the lamellae and the tips of the rhinophores are black, with some yellowish areas above. A third morph, olive in colour with more extensive white dorsal pigmentation, may also belong to this species, based on a photograph taken at Serenity Bay in the Solitary Islands Marine Park in 2016.

The radula comprises 12 rows of teeth with the formula 12 × 3.2.0.2.3, with no rachidian tooth. The inner lateral teeth have a narrow base and a triangular, spatulate distal cusp, while the outer laterals are larger and hamate, with a strong distal cusp; all the lateral teeth bear a hook-shaped, wing-like expansion. The marginal teeth are small, flat and plate-like, decreasing in size outwards. The reproductive system is triaulic; the penis is armed with two types of chitinous spines, elongate spines nearer the prostate and hook-shaped spines nearer the genital opening, and the vas deferens contains a cup-shaped structure marking the end of its prostatic section.

== Distribution and habitat ==
The species is known only from southern Australia. The type material was collected at Nelson Bay (Port Stephens), Fly Point (Port Stephens) and Low Reef (Sandy Beach, northern NSW).

== Phylogenetics ==
Molecular phylogenetic analyses based on the mitochondrial COI and 16S markers and the nuclear H3 gene, including sequences from five of the type specimens, recovered all sampled individuals as a single clade with maximum support, with an intraspecific COI divergence of 0.3–1.2%. As in previous studies, the genus Polycera was not recovered as monophyletic, but P. nimbsi consistently grouped among other Polycera species, and its morphology matches the character combination of the genus.
