= Polycera parvula =

Scientific classification
- Kingdom: Animalia
- Phylum: Mollusca
- Class: Gastropoda
- Order: Nudibranchia
- Family: Polyceridae
- Genus: Polycera
- Species: P. parvula

Binomial name
- Polycera parvula (Burn, 1958)

Synonyms
- Palio parvula Burn, 1958

Species of gastropod

Polycera parvula is a species of sea slug, a nudibranch, a shell-less marine gastropod mollusc in the family Polyceridae.

== Distribution ==
This species was described from Point Danger, Torquay, Victoria, Australia. It occurs from New South Wales to central Victoria.
