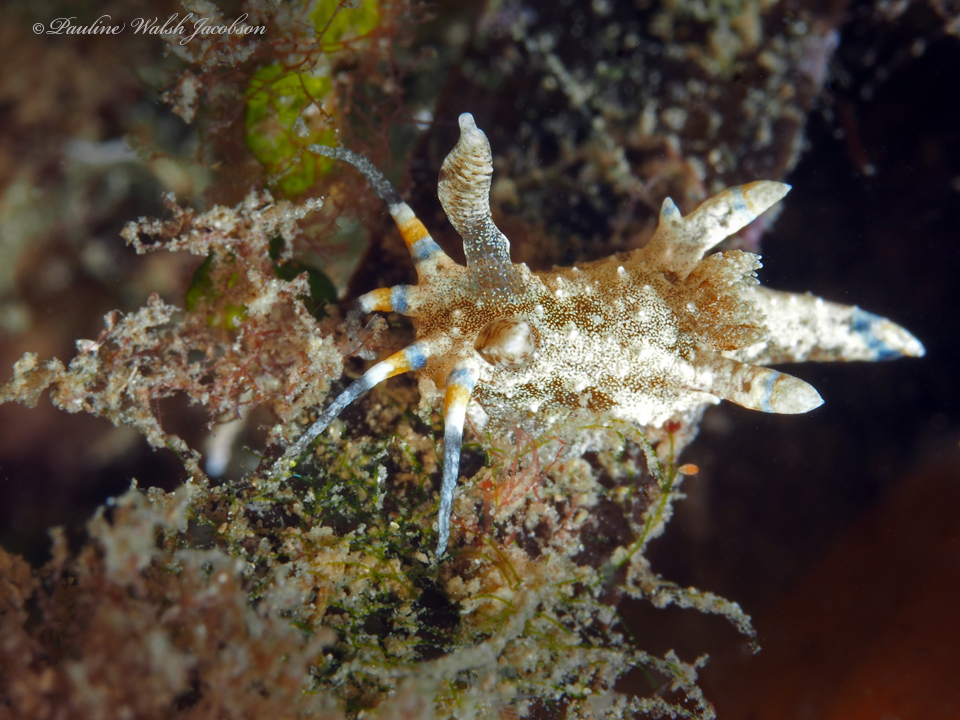

Scientific classification
- Kingdom: Animalia
- Phylum: Mollusca
- Class: Gastropoda
- Order: Nudibranchia
- Family: Polyceridae
- Genus: Polycera
- Species: P. hummi

Binomial name
- Polycera hummi Abbott, 1952

= Polycera hummi =

Species of gastropod

Polycera hummi is a species of sea slug, a nudibranch, a shell-less marine gastropod mollusc in the family Polyceridae.

== Distribution ==
This species was described from the Gulf of Mexico, Florida. It also occurs in North Carolina.
