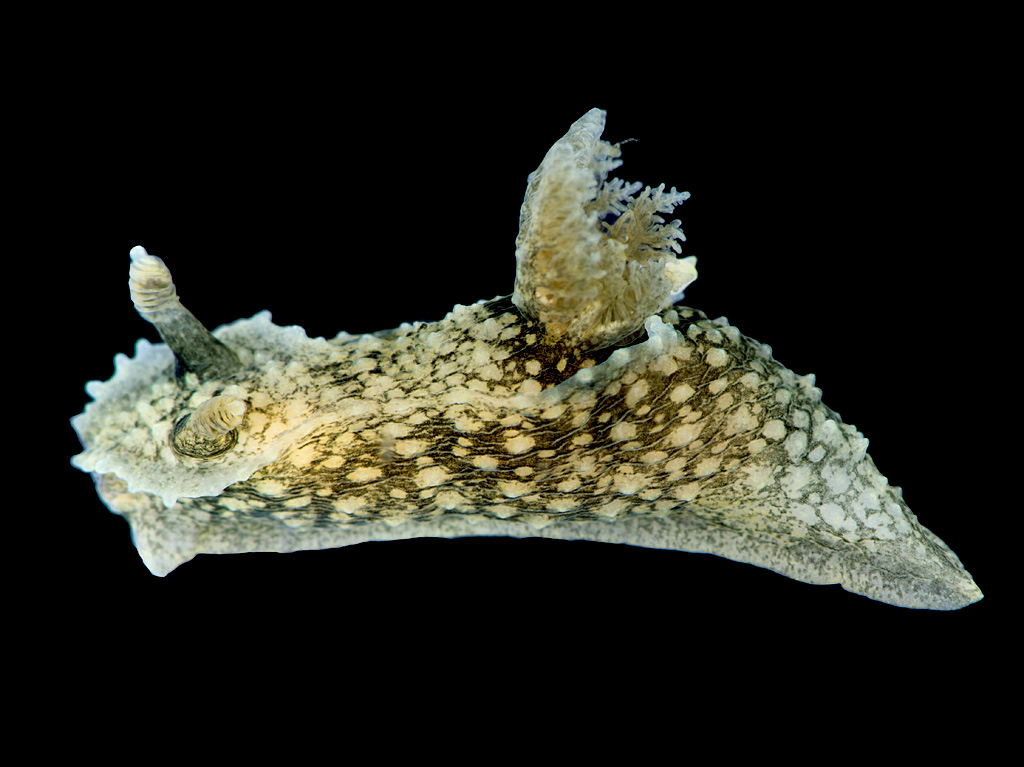
- Palio nothus, Strangford Lough, Northern Ireland.

Scientific classification
- Domain: Eukaryota
- Kingdom: Animalia
- Phylum: Mollusca
- Class: Gastropoda
- Order: Nudibranchia
- Superfamily: Polyceroidea
- Family: Polyceridae
- Genus: Palio
- Species: P. nothus

Binomial name
- Palio nothus (Johnston, 1838)

Synonyms
- Triopa nothus Johnston, 1838; Polycera ocellata Alder & Hancock, 1842

= Palio nothus =

Species of gastropod

Palio nothus is a species of sea slug, a nudibranch, a shell-less marine gastropod mollusc in the family Polyceridae.

== Distribution ==
This species was described from Prestonpans Bay, Firth of Forth, Scotland. It has subsequently been reported from the United Kingdom north to Scandinavia, Russia and Greenland. It has also been reported from the Pacific coast of Canada.

== Ecology ==
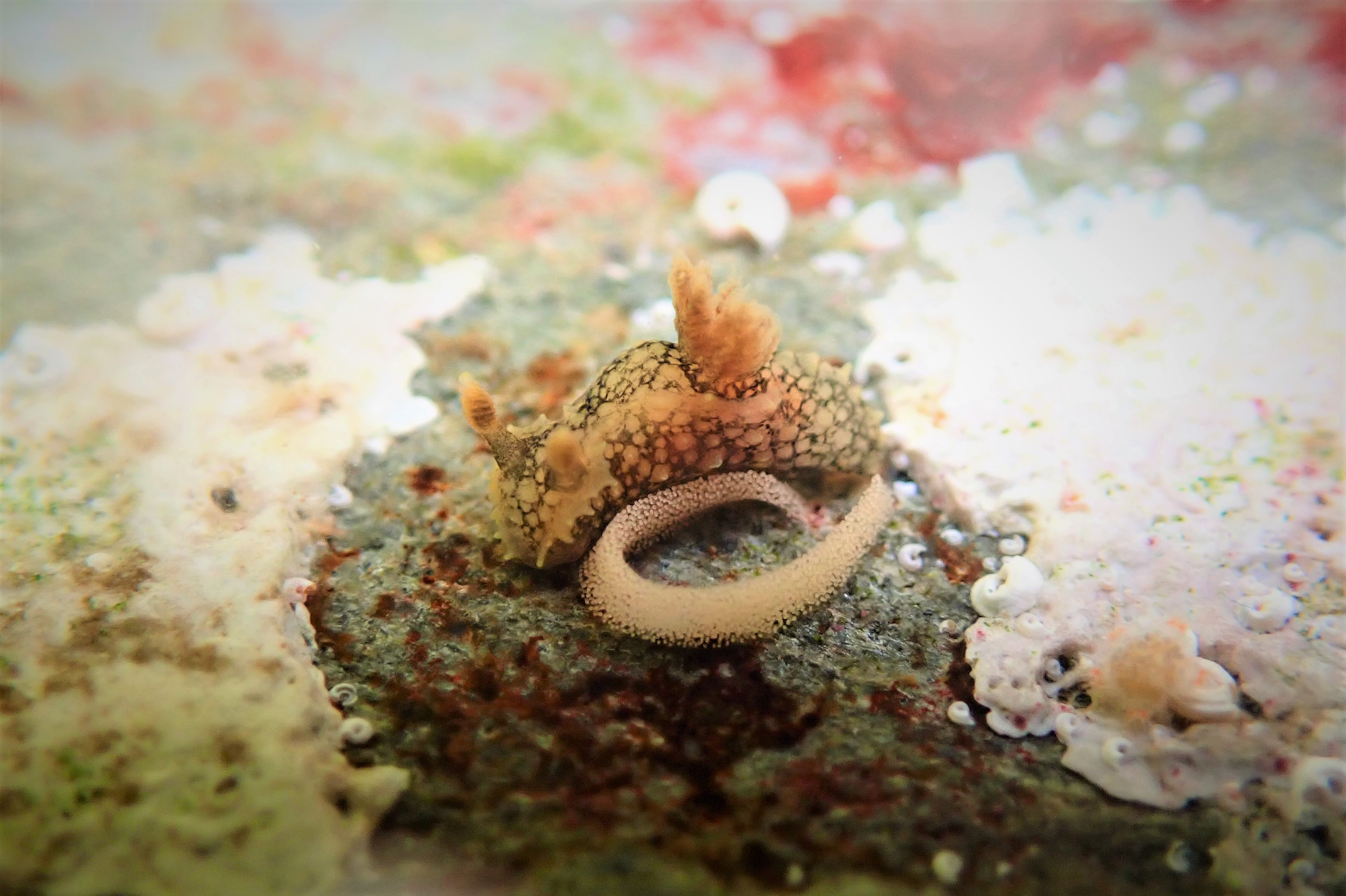
Palio nothus and its eggs found under a rock in a tide pool in Brittany, France.

In the north-east Atlantic Palio nothus feeds on bryozoans of the genus Bowerbankia. Its eggs are laid in a short ribbon-like spiral.
