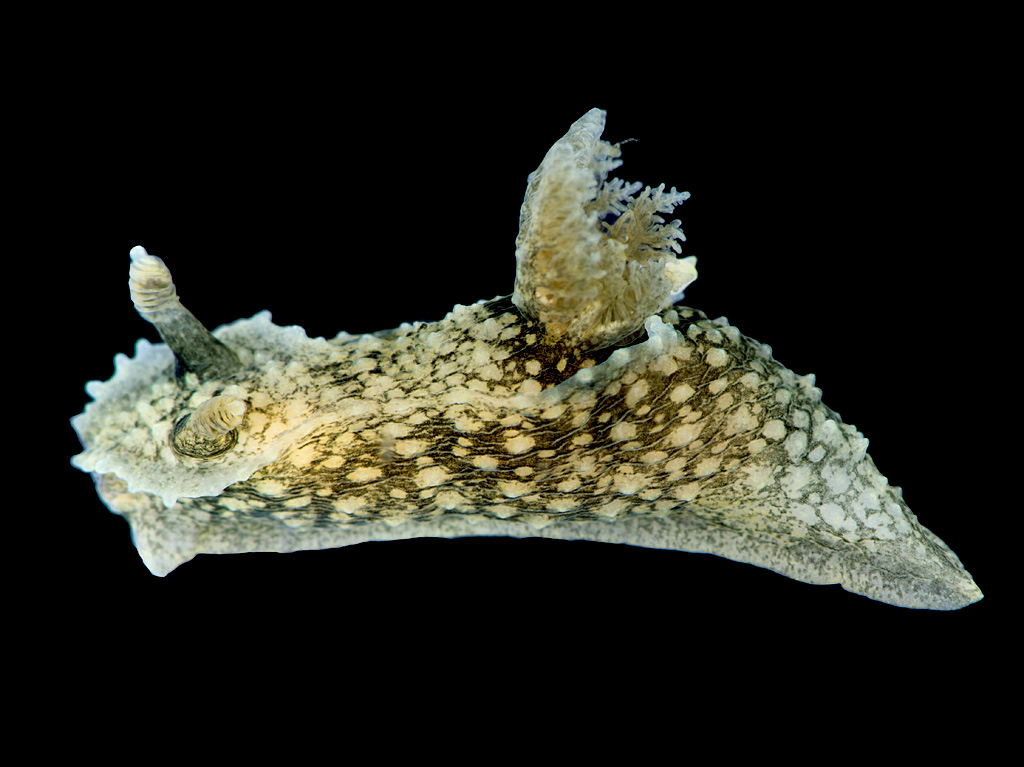
- Palio nothus, Strangford Lough, Northern Ireland.

Scientific classification
- Domain: Eukaryota
- Kingdom: Animalia
- Phylum: Mollusca
- Class: Gastropoda
- Order: Nudibranchia
- Superfamily: Polyceroidea
- Family: Polyceridae
- Subfamily: Polycerinae
- Genus: Palio; Gray, 1857

= Palio (gastropod) =

Genus of gastropods

Palio is a genus of sea slugs, dorid nudibranchs, shell-less marine gastropod molluscs in the family Polyceridae.

== Species ==
The following species are recognised in the genus Palio:

- Palio amakusana (Baba, 1960)
- Palio dubia (M. Sars, 1829)
- Palio gracilis (Pease, 1971)
- Palio ionica Korshunova, Sanamyan & Martynov, 2015
- Palio nothus (Johnston, 1838)
- Palio zosterae (O'Donoghue, 1924) eelgrass polycera
