= Skomer Marine Conservation Zone =

Marine protected area in Wales

Coordinates: 51.732°N 5.276°W

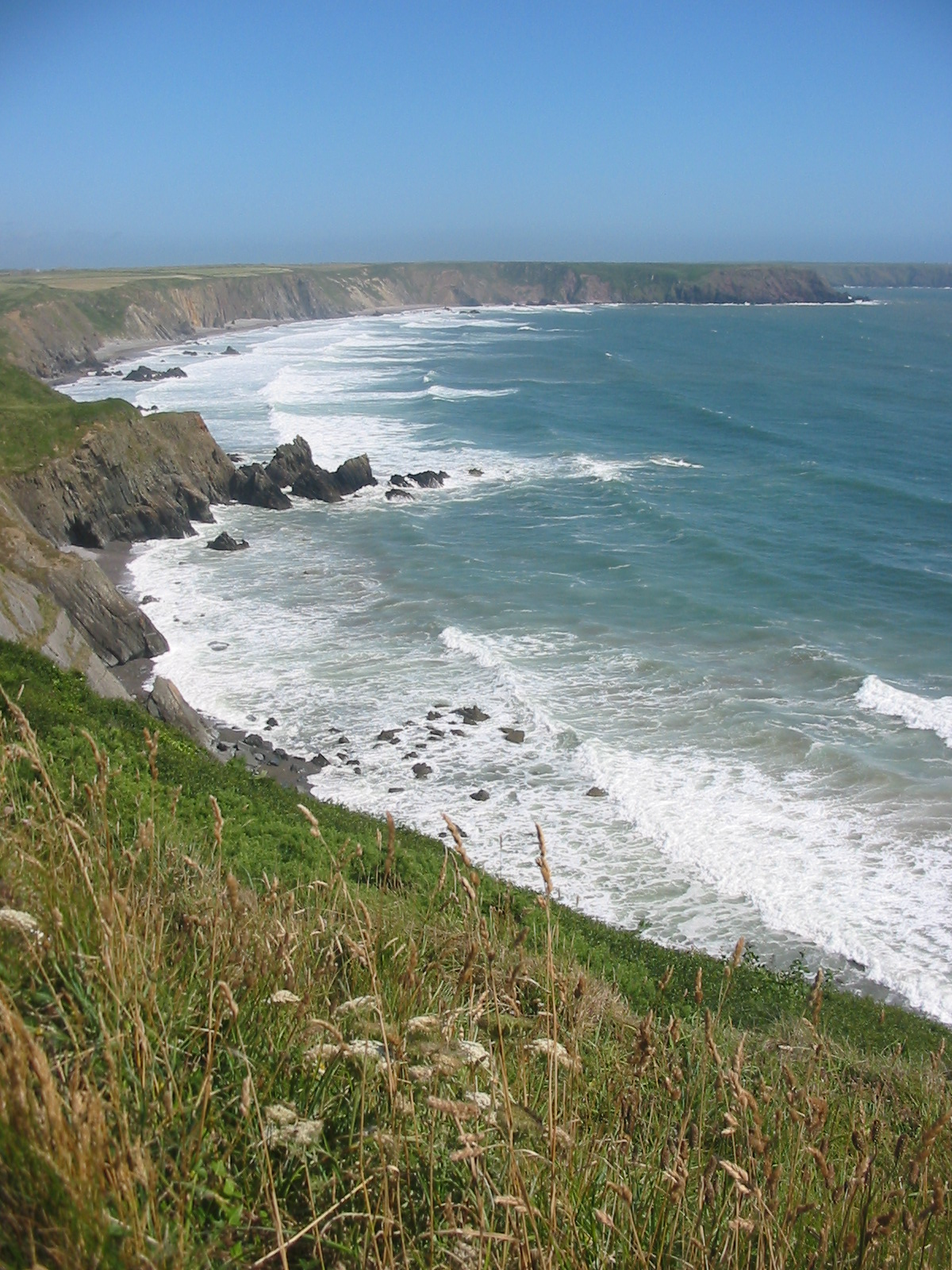
View of the sea from part of the Marloes peninsula

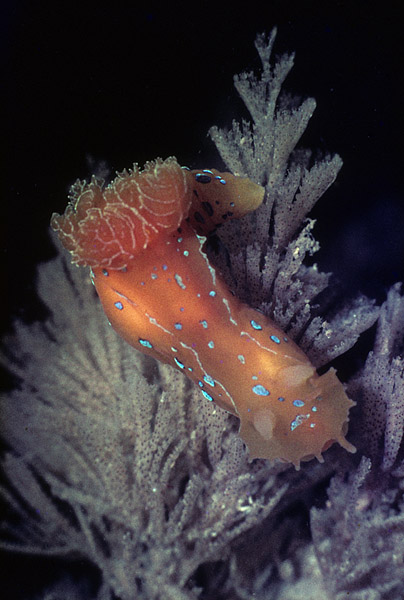
A live individual of the nudibranch Greilada elegans on a bryozoan in Skomer Marine Nature Reserve, Wales, UK

Skomer Marine Conservation Zone is an underwater marine nature reserve located off the coast of Pembrokeshire in Wales. The nature reserve completely surrounds the islands of Skomer and Middleholm, and encompasses the mainland coastline around the end of the Marloes peninsula, including the small bay of Martin's Haven.

The sea bed and rocky shelves of the island are teeming with life. Common eelgrass, Zostera marina, one of the very few plants that flower underwater, grows on beds of sand and gravel in sheltered waters and its long, grass-like leaves form underwater lawns that provide food and shelter for other plants and animals. Species of lobsters, crabs and other crustaceans abound, and grey seals give birth on the coast in October and November.

== History ==
Although the island of Skomer had long been a protected area, the Marine Nature Reserve was not established until 1990. It was one of only three Marine Nature Reserves in United Kingdom. Since the introduction of Marine Conservation Zones in 2013, there has been a larger network of marine reserves in the UK. Skomer itself was reclassified as a Marine Conservation Zone in December 2014.

=== Related protected area ===
In 2004 Pembrokeshire Marine SAC was designated. The SAC is much larger than the nature reserve at 132,174 ha.

== See also ==
- Skomer
