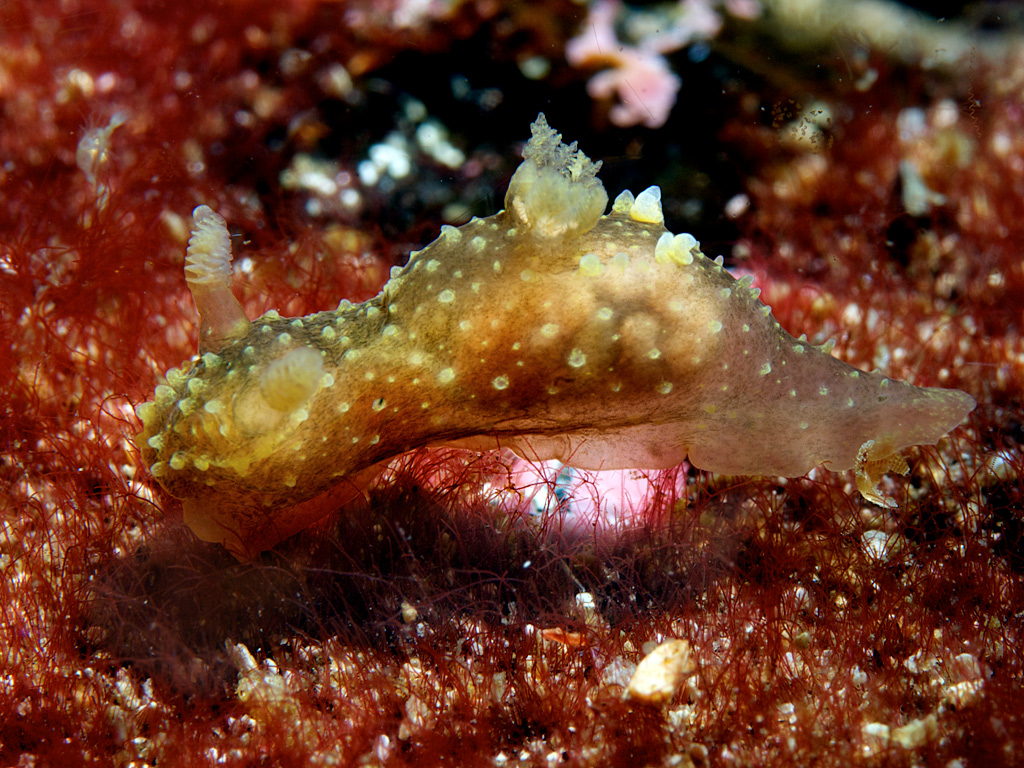
- Palio dubia, Gulen Municipality, Norway.

Scientific classification
- Kingdom: Animalia
- Phylum: Mollusca
- Class: Gastropoda
- Order: Nudibranchia
- Family: Polyceridae
- Genus: Palio
- Species: P. dubia

Binomial name
- Palio dubia (M. Sars, 1829)

Synonyms
- List: Doris illuminata Gould, 1841; Euplocamus hollboelli Møller, 1842; Palio lessonii (d'Orbigny, 1837); Palio pallida Bergh, 1880; Polycera citrina Alder & Hancock, 1841; Polycera dubia M. Sars, 1829; Polycera lessoni d'Orbigny, 1837; Polycera lessonii d'Orbigny, 1837; Polycera modesta Lovén, 1846; Polycera pudica Lovén, 1846

= Palio dubia =

Species of gastropod

Palio dubia is a species of sea slug, a nudibranch, a shell-less marine gastropod mollusc in the family Polyceridae.

== Distribution ==
This species was described from Norway. It has subsequently been reported from the United Kingdom north to Scandinavia, Russia and Greenland. It has also been reported from the Pacific coast of Canada.

== Ecology ==
In Scotland and Ireland Palio dubia feeds on the bryozoan Eucratea loricata.
