= Martin's Haven =

Bay in Pembrokeshire, Wales, UK,

Coordinates: 51.736°N 5.245°W

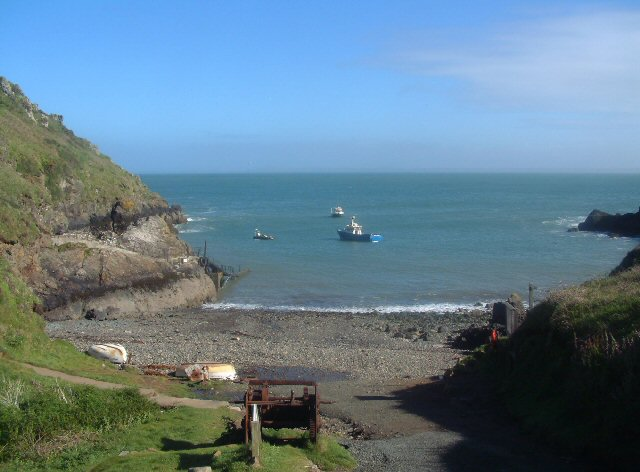
Martin's Haven

Martin's Haven is a small, north-facing cove in Pembrokeshire, Wales, UK, on the Dale Peninsula, with views across St Bride's Bay towards St David's. It is recorded by the Royal Commission as a historic place name.

== Features ==
The Haven's shingle beach has a stone slipway which acts as an embarkation point for the ferry which visits the nearby island of Skomer, a national nature reserve, during summer. Martin's Haven lies within the Skomer Marine Conservation Zone and is popular for scuba diving and attractive for its dark sky. Grey seals can be seen basking on the rocks.

== Amenities ==
The Haven is on the Pembrokeshire Coast Path and in the Pembrokeshire Coast National Park. It has its own car park and toilet facilities, owned by the National Trust, as is much of the small peninsula on which Martin's Haven lies. The National Trust area features a peninsula walk from which most of Pembrokeshire's islands can be seen.

== Anchorage ==
For sailors and divers there is safe anchorage at Martin's Haven for small boats, with the mouth of the cove having 6 metres of water. Onshore is a Wildlife Trust visitor centre. On the west side of the Haven, at Wooltack Point, there is a National Coastwatch Institution watch station.

== Mediaeval stone ==
When constructing the visitor toilets 100m inland from the Haven, workmen found an inscribed stone with a ring-cross, whose possible original function in the 9th or 10th centuries was as a marker or prayer station for travellers; the Haven is a well-established landing place from Skomer, which has been occupied since before recorded history.
