= List of public art in Pembrokeshire =

Pembrokeshire shown within Wales

This is a list of public art in Pembrokeshire, Wales. This list applies only to works of public art and monuments on permanent display in an outdoor public space and does not, for example, include artworks in museums.

== Carew ==
| Image | Title / subject | Location and coordinates | Date | Artist / designer | Type | Material | Dimensions | Designation | Wikidata | Notes |
|---|---|---|---|---|---|---|---|---|---|---|
| More images | The Carew Cross | Carew | c.1035 | | Celtic cross | Stone | 4m high | Grade I | QI7742272 | Inscription commemorates Maredudd ap Edwin. |
| | War memorial | Carew | 1929 | T. W. Colley & Sons, T. Picton | Obelisk on pedestal and plinth | Marble | 3.2m high | | | |

== Carn Menyn ==
| Image | Title / subject | Location and coordinates | Date | Artist / designer | Type | Material | Dimensions | Designation | Wikidata | Notes |
|---|---|---|---|---|---|---|---|---|---|---|
| | Waldo Williams 1904–1971 | Rhos Fach, Carn Menyn | 1978 | | Cut monolith | Stone | | | | Additional plaque added 2010. |
| | Carn Menyn Monument, | Rhos Fach, Carn Menyn | 1989 | | Monolith | Blue stone | | | | |

== Coastline ==
| Image | Title / subject | Location and coordinates | Date | Artist / designer | Type | Material | Dimensions | Designation | Wikidata | Notes |
|---|---|---|---|---|---|---|---|---|---|---|
| | Memorial to Richard Williams | Between Solva and Gribbin | | | Column | Stone | | | | Erected to mark the donation of the headland to the National Trust by the Williams family. |
| | Memorial to Dewi Emrys (1879–1952) | Pwll Deri | | | Monolith | Stone | | | | |

== Fishguard ==
| Image | Title / subject | Location and coordinates | Date | Artist / designer | Type | Material | Dimensions | Designation | Wikidata | Notes |
|---|---|---|---|---|---|---|---|---|---|---|
| | War memorial | Junction of West St. & The Square, Fishguard | | | Cenotaph with surrounding walls and plaques | Granite cenotaph & bronze plaques | | | | |
| | Fishguard Herrings | Pendock Quay, Lower Town, Fishguard | 2006 | John Cleal | Sculpture | Bronze shoal of herrings mounted on a Preseli bluestone | | | | |
| | Sun Lover | Lower Town, Fishguard | Unveiled 2009 | John Cleal | Sculpture | Stone | | | | |

== Haverfordwest ==
| Image | Title / subject | Location and coordinates | Date | Artist / designer | Type | Material | Dimensions | Designation | Wikidata | Notes |
|---|---|---|---|---|---|---|---|---|---|---|
| | Memorial to William Nichol | Dark Street, Haverfordwest | 1912 | | Circular column with urn | Red granite | | Grade II | | Nichol was a Protestant martyr burnt at the stake in April 1558. |
| More images | Pembrokeshire County War Memorial | Picton Place, Haverfordwest | 1921 | W. R. Morgan (sculptor) | Dragon statue on a pedestal | Stone with bronze plaques | 4.5m high | Grade II | Q29507591 | Architects, Oswald Milne & Paul Phipps. |
| | Looking Up | Withybush General Hospital, Haverfordwest | | John Cleal | Sculpture on a pedestal | Stone | | | | |

== Lampeter Velfrey ==
| Image | Title / subject | Location and coordinates | Date | Artist / designer | Type | Material | Dimensions | Designation | Wikidata | Notes |
|---|---|---|---|---|---|---|---|---|---|---|
| | War memorial | St Peter's Church, Lampeter Velfrey | 1921 | | Celtic cross on a pedestal & base | Granite | | Grade II | | |

== Little Newcastle ==
| Image | Title / subject | Location and coordinates | Date | Artist / designer | Type | Material | Dimensions | Designation | Wikidata | Notes |
|---|---|---|---|---|---|---|---|---|---|---|
| | Bartholomew Roberts, (1682–1722), the pirate Black Bart | Village Green, Little Newcastle, Puncheston | | | Monolith | Stone | | | | |

== Milford Haven ==
| Image | Title / subject | Location and coordinates | Date | Artist / designer | Type | Material | Dimensions | Designation | Wikidata | Notes |
|---|---|---|---|---|---|---|---|---|---|---|
| | War Memorial | Hamilton Terrace, Milford Haven | 1923-24 | | Pedestal with 3 statues | Granite pedestal and white marble statues | 6.5m high | Grade II | Q29491101 | Contractor was E Jones of Llanybydder, surveyor J P Morgan. |
| | The Belgian War Memorial | Hamilton Terrace, Milford Haven | 1919 | Evan Jones | Obelisk | Red granite | 4.8m high | Grade II | Q29491102 | |
| | RNMD Monument | The Rath, Milford Haven | | | Marine mine and launching trolley | Metal objects on a stone plinth | | | | |
| More images | Tribute to Milford Haven fishermen | The Rath, Milford Haven | 1992 | Bryan Hackett | Statue on rectangular plinth | Bronze statue | | | | |
| | Energy Industry Workers Memorial | The Rath, Milford Haven | 2013 | Andy Griffiths | Abstract sculpture | Bronze and stainless steel | | | | |

== Narberth ==
| Image | Title / subject | Location and coordinates | Date | Artist / designer | Type | Material | Dimensions | Designation | Wikidata | Notes |
|---|---|---|---|---|---|---|---|---|---|---|
| | War memorial | Market Square, Narberth | 1923 | D F Ingleton | Octagonal cross on a stepped pedestal | Granite | | Grade II | Q29485696 | |
| | The Landsker Cross | Narberth | 1995 | Howard Bowcott | Celtic cross | Stacked slate | | | | |

== Nevern ==
| Image | Title / subject | Location and coordinates | Date | Artist / designer | Type | Material | Dimensions | Designation | Wikidata | Notes |
|---|---|---|---|---|---|---|---|---|---|---|
| More images | The Nevern Cross | Nevern | c.1035 | | Celtic cross | Stone | | | | |

== Pembroke ==
| Image | Title / subject | Location and coordinates | Date | Artist / designer | Type | Material | Dimensions | Designation | Wikidata | Notes |
|---|---|---|---|---|---|---|---|---|---|---|
| More images | War memorial | Westgate Hill, Pembroke | 1924 | T. W. Colley & Sons | Cenotaph | Stone | 3.2m high | Grade II | Q29506668 | |
| | Energy Industry Workers Memorial | Pembroke | 2013 | | Sculptured bench | Portland stone | | | | |
| More images | Henry VII | Mill Bridge, Pembroke | 2017 | Harriet Addyman | Statue | Bronze | 2.4m high | | | |

== Pembroke Dock ==
| Image | Title / subject | Location and coordinates | Date | Artist / designer | Type | Material | Dimensions | Designation | Wikidata | Notes |
|---|---|---|---|---|---|---|---|---|---|---|
| | War memorial | Churchyard of St John the Evangelist, Pembroke Dock | 1921 | John Coates Carter | Calvary on pedestal & stepped plinth | Red sandstone calvary, stone pedestal & limestone plinth | | Grade II | Q29492184 | |

== St Davids ==
| Image | Title / subject | Location and coordinates | Date | Artist / designer | Type | Material | Dimensions | Designation | Wikidata | Notes |
|---|---|---|---|---|---|---|---|---|---|---|
| More images | The City Cross | St Davids | c. 14th century (shaft); 1873 (head) | | Octagonial Celtic cross | Stone | | Grade II* | Q17743347 | |

== Tenby ==
| Image | Title / subject | Location and coordinates | Date | Artist / designer | Type | Material | Dimensions | Designation | Wikidata | Notes |
|---|---|---|---|---|---|---|---|---|---|---|
| More images | Prince Albert | Tenby | 1864–65 | John Evan Thomas | Statue on pedestal and steps | Marble and stone | Statue 2.7m tall | Grade II | Q29485388 | |
| | Dyster Memorial Drinking Fountain | Tenby | 1867 | F. R. Kempson | Octagonal column with fountains & gas lamp | Stone | | Grade II | | Memorial to Lt Col Thomas Josiah Wedgewood, 1798–1860, presented by the mayor of Tenby, Dr F. D. Dyster. |
| More images | War memorial | Tenby | 1921 | J. Howard Morgan and G. H. Beynon | Pillar | Stone pillar with marble panels | 3.5m high | | | |
