= Tregwynt =

Tregwynt may refer to

- Tregwynt Mansion, a mansion in the parish of Granston, Pembrokeshire, Wales
- Tregwynt Hoard, a mid-17th century hoard of coins found at Tregwynt Mansion in Pembrokeshire, Wales
- Melin Tregwynt (Tregwynt Mill), a woolen mill in the hamlet of Tregwynt in Pembrokeshire, Wales
