= County of Pembroke War Memorial =

Memorial in Pembrokeshire, Wales

- Wales
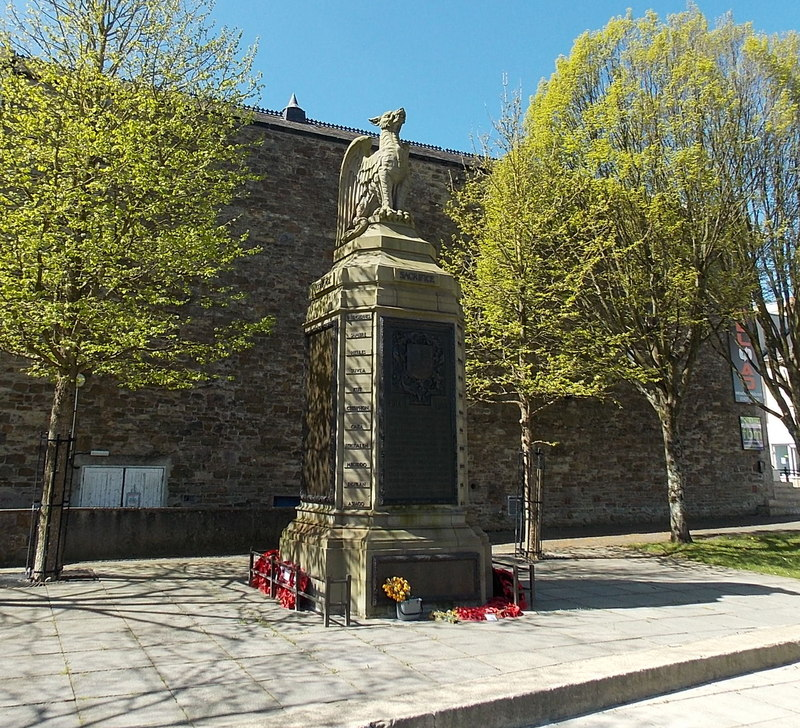
- For Men from the county of Pembrokeshire who died in the First World War
- Unveiled: 3 September 1921
- Location: 51.802441°N 4.965921°W; Haverfordwest, Pembrokeshire, Wales
- Designed by: Oswald Milne, Paul Phipps

Listed Building – Grade II
- Official name: County of Pembroke War Memorial
- Designated: 30 November 2005

The County of Pembroke War Memorial (Welsh: Cofeb Ryfel Sir Benfro) is a county war memorial in Pembrokeshire, Wales. It was erected in 1921 in Pembrokeshire's county town, Haverfordwest, to commemorate the county's fallen of World War I. It is a Grade II listed structure.

== Planning ==
Originally, the local authority's intention, having established a public fund to build a memorial hospital in Haverfordwest, was to use money left over to place plaques in the town to remember those killed in the war. As the administrative centre for the county, Haverfordwest was believed to be the appropriate place for this. However, there were calls, led by local MP Sir Ivor Philipps and other public and political figures, for a more substantial memorial. While funding continued and professional advice was sought, a design and location was decided upon. The War Memorial Committee finalised the design and materials in August 1920.

== Design and construction ==
The memorial is a plinth on which rests a square column, topped by a seated dragon with folded wings. It was designed by the architects Oswald Milne and Paul Phipps, and the sculptor was W. R. Morgan. The memorial was constructed of Forest of Dean stone with bronze plaques and built by Haverfordwest masons T. Morgan & Son. Standing 16 feet (4.9 m) tall, it was originally sited facing over the New Bridge in Salutation Square.

The memorial plaque to the front bears the arms of the county and has the following inscription:

IN REMEMBRANCE OF THE MEN OF THE COUNTY OF PEMBROKE WHO AT THE CALL OF KING AND COUNTRY LEFT ALL THAT WAS DEAR TO THEM, ENDURED HARDNESS, FACED DANGER AND FINALLY PASSED OUT OF THE SIGHT OF MEN BY THE PATH OF DUTY AND SELF SACRIFICE GIVING UP THEIR OWN LIVES THAT OTHERS MIGHT LIVE IN FREEDOM. LET THOSE WHO COME AFTER SEE TO IT THAT THEIR NAMES BE NOT FORGOTTEN.

Listed on each of the other three sides are four columns of approximately 100 names, ordered by regiment or unit. The Imperial War Museum's website lists some. The words SACRIFICE, HONOUR, VICTORY and COURAGE appear above the plaques; on each of the four chamfered corners are listed eleven battle honours.

The unveiling, on 3 September 1921, was performed by Private Hubert William ("Stokey") Lewis V.C. of the 11th Welsh, and was attended by dignitaries and large crowds.

When new roads were constructed in the 1970s, the memorial was moved to its present location in Picton Place, close by the former Masonic Hall. The structure was Grade II listed in 2005 "...as a particularly fine piece of early C20 sculpture and for historical interest as the county war memorial", and the Royal Commission on Monuments placed the record of the memorial online in 2013.

== See also ==
- List of public art in Haverfordwest
