= Granston =

Village and parish in Pembrokeshire, Wales

Coordinates: 51.96°N 5.07°W

Granston: Welsh: Treopert
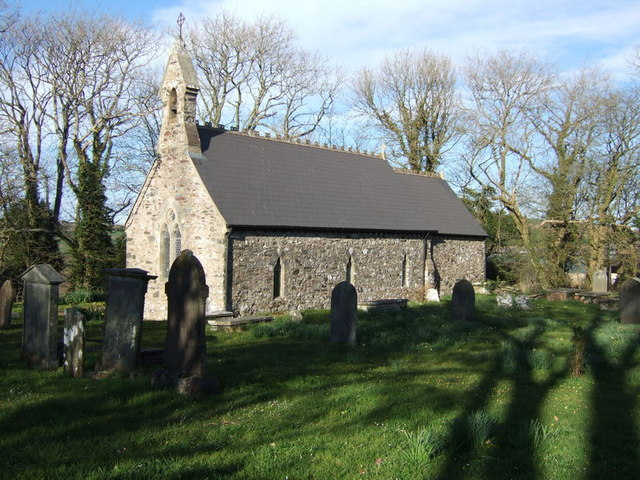
- St Catherine's Church

- Location within Pembrokeshire
- OS grid reference: SM8934
- Community: Pencaer
- Principal area: Pembrokeshire
- Country: Wales
- Sovereign state: United Kingdom
- Police: Dyfed-Powys
- Fire: Mid and West Wales
- Ambulance: Welsh

Granston (Welsh: Treopert) is a hamlet and parish in Pembrokeshire, Wales. The parish was in the Hundred of Dewisland and includes the settlements of Llangloffan and Tregwynt, with Tregwynt woollen mill. Granston is in the community of Pencaer.

== Name ==
The Welsh name of the hamlet, Treopert, suggests an association with a Robert, possibly Robert FitzMartin of Cemais. In 1292 the village was referred to (Latin) as "Villa Grandi", and in 1535 as "Grandiston" (Grand's Farm), possibly a reference to a French name, Grand.

== History ==
Prehistoric remains were noted in the parish in 1920.

The earliest church records of the parish are from 1291 and 1326. The parish was attached to the crown after the Dissolution. There was an Episcopal court at Granston.

The size of the parish is 1,639 acres (6.63 km^{2}).

There are a number of listed buildings in the parish and, following the change from civil parishes to communities, Granston became part of the community of Pencaer.

=== Population ===
Granston parish in 1833 had a population of 195.

The population in 1872 was 156 people occupying 31 houses. Analysis of the 1881 census found that the four most frequently-occurring surnames in the parish (67 of 175 inhabitants) were Davies, Evans, Thomas and Williams.

== Places of worship ==
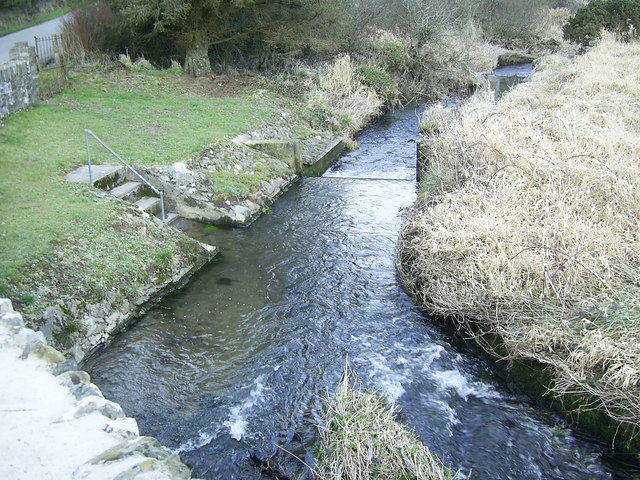
River baptismal pool, Pont Llangloffan

The parish was annexed to that of Mathry and the church dedicated to St Catherine (sometimes recorded as Katherine), one of only three mediaeval churches in Wales to be dedicated to the saint. When the church was visited by the Royal Commission in 1920 it was found to have been constructed in 1877 with no evidence of the mediaeval structure save an octagonal font probably from the 14th century. However, the diocesan description notes that the foundations are mediaeval.

The parish includes the hamlet of Llangloffan, where there is a Baptist chapel. The original chapel was built in 1706, restored in 1749 and 1791 and rebuilt in 1862. There is no baptismal pool at the chapel, baptisms being performed at a specially constructed site in the Western Cleddau at Pont Llangloffan, south of the hamlet. Llangloffan is the name of a Welsh hymn melody (composer unknown).

Archives for both churches are kept by Dyfed Family History Society.

== Tregwynt ==
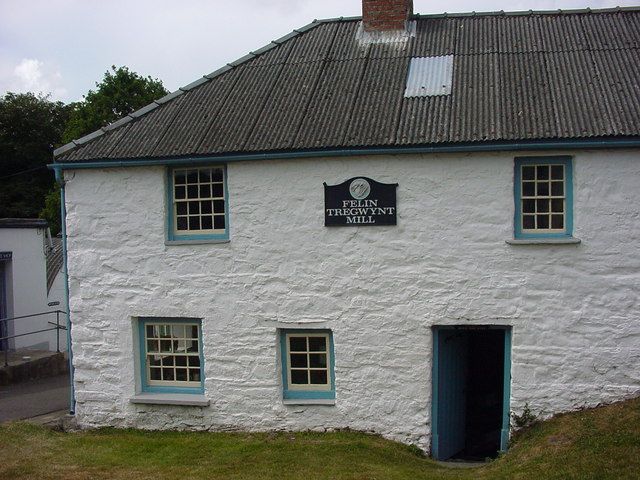
Melin Tregwynt woollen mill

Granston includes the estate of Tregwynt, whose papers are held by the Pembrokeshire Record Office. In the 14th century Sir William Horton of Tregwynt married the heiress to Candleston Castle. The Tregwynt Hoard, from the Civil War, was found at Tregwynt Mansion in 1996. The present Grade II*-listed manor house and extensions date from the 18th century.

Tregwynt mill (Melin Tregwynt) dates back to the 17th century when it served the surrounding area's sheep farming. It is still in operation, employing about 30 people, and in 2012 celebrated 100 years as a family business, now weaving for a global market. The mill featured in a BBC2 Wales Made in Wales episode in December 2012.

== Llangloffan ==
Llangloffan hamlet is south of Granston. Close by the source of the Western Cleddau river, the 40 hectares (99 acres) Llangloffan Fen includes a 15.1 hectares (37 acres) National Nature Reserve and a Site of Special Scientific Interest (SSSI). Llangloffan lends its name to a range of Welsh farmhouse cheeses; the brand was acquired by Carmarthenshire Cheese Company in 2006.
