= Llanwnda =

Llanwnda may refer to:

- Llanwnda, Gwynedd
- Llanwnda, Pembrokeshire
