= Calburga =

Canadian barque

Coordinates: 52°01′04″N 5°5′35″W

History
- Name: Calburga
- Owner: Adam MacDougall
- Operator: W.D. Nelson
- Route: Halifax – Liverpool.
- Builder: Adam MacDougall
- Completed: 1890
- Identification: IMO number: 90478
- Fate: Ran aground on November 13, 1915

General characteristics
- Tonnage: 1,406 GRT
- Length: 64.008 m (210 ft 0 in)
- Beam: 11.94 m (39 ft 2 in)
- Height: 7.07 m (23 ft 2 in)
- Sail plan: Square rig
- Crew: 14
- Notes: Last Canadian-built square-rigger of large tonnage left that was still registered in Canada.

Calburga was a Canadian barque, the last Canadian-built square-rigger of large tonnage. She was built in 1890 at South Maitland, Nova Scotia by local shipbuilder, Adams MacDougall. Calburga was a spruce built vessel, iron and copper fastened, and equipped with three masts. Calburga boasted luxuries such as a windmill pump installed in 1913 to keep free of water, a wheelhouse completely enclosing the helmsman and wheel gear, round and elliptical stems, and an exterior ornamented by hand-carved scrolling.

Calburga was an important transporter in the timber trade to South America and also sailed to South Africa, Buenos Aires, and Great Britain. Amidst her travels, Calburga also transferred ownership and command. She was owned at various times by Thomas Douglas, and W.K. Stair and commanded by Jonatha Douglas, Captain Mackenzie, and W.D. Nelson.

During World War I, Calburga saw service as a transport ship between Canada and Great Britain. On November 13, 1915, on her second transport voyage from Canada to Great Britain, under the command of W.D. Nelson, Calburga ran aground on the rocks near Strumble Head, Pembrokeshire, Wales. Nelson and his crew of 14 came upon a gale described as "one of the most violent storms experienced in twenty years." A lifeboat from the Strumble Head Lighthouse found Calburga a total wreck. The crew were nowhere to be found and the coast was strewn with timber. The crew had managed to escape in their own lifeboat and came ashore at Aberbach beach, where they were welcomed by The Shipwrecked Fishermen and Mariners' Royal Benevolent Society and provided transport back to their home port in Halifax.

The wreck of Calburga still lies on the Welsh seabed and has become a popular diving destination. A model of the ship, created by David Coldwell and Glenn Buckmaster, is on display at the Maritime Museum of the Atlantic in Halifax.
