= Trefasser =

Village in Pembrokeshire, Wales

Coordinates: 52°N 5.07°W

- Location within Pembrokeshire
- Principal area: Pembrokeshire
- Country: Wales
- Sovereign state: United Kingdom
- Police: Dyfed-Powys
- Fire: Mid and West Wales
- Ambulance: Welsh

Trefasser (variations: Tref-Asser, or Trêf Asser, or Asserton; translation: "town" of "Asser") is a hamlet, located to the west of Fishguard in western Wales. Historically, it is part of the parish of Llanwnda. It lies on the coast of St George's Channel within the Pembrokeshire Coast National Park. A stream named Cledde Goch runs close by.

Trefasser's farms, houses and cottages are the only settled area of Pen Caer. David Tress has painted the place in an abstract painting.

== History ==
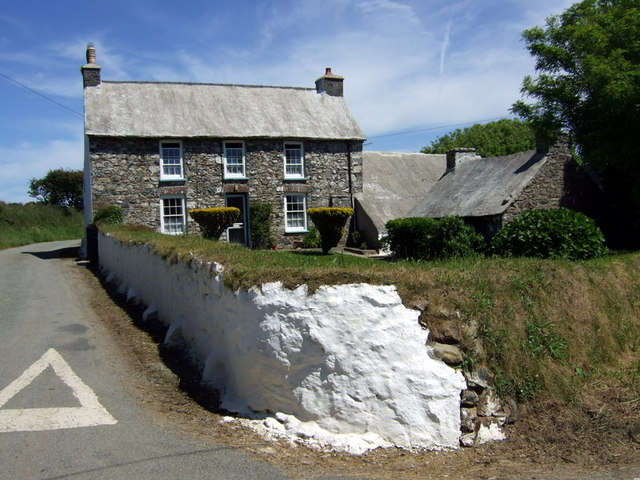
Trefasser Isaf

Trefasser was mentioned in the survey of episcopal lands in 1326. It at one time belonged to Major Thomas Askwith Jenkins (1809–1877) of Trevigin.

In July 2009, the body of a 47-year-old man from Stourbridge in the West Midlands was found at the bottom of the cliffs of Trefasser.

== Etymology ==
The general consensus is that Trefasser is named after Bishop Asser, a Welsh churchman who was friend and biographer of King Alfred in the 9th century and may have been his birthplace.

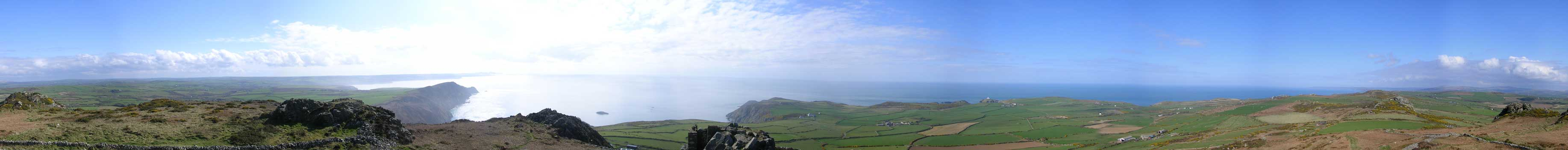
Coastline from nearby Pwll Deri. Trefasser is located inland from the cliffs towards the left, nearby.

== Castell Poeth ==
A tumulus named Castell Poeth ("the Hot Castle") is located nearby. It is an exploratory castelet with an occasional beacon. Described as a ditched, raised enclosure, oval in shape, and measuring 30 m (98 ft) by 60 m (200 ft) across, it has an attached second oval measuring 46 m (151 ft) by 54 m (177 ft).
