= Strumble Head Lighthouse =

Lighthouse in Pembrokeshire, Wales

Strumble Head Lighthouse Pen Strwmbl Ynys Meicel
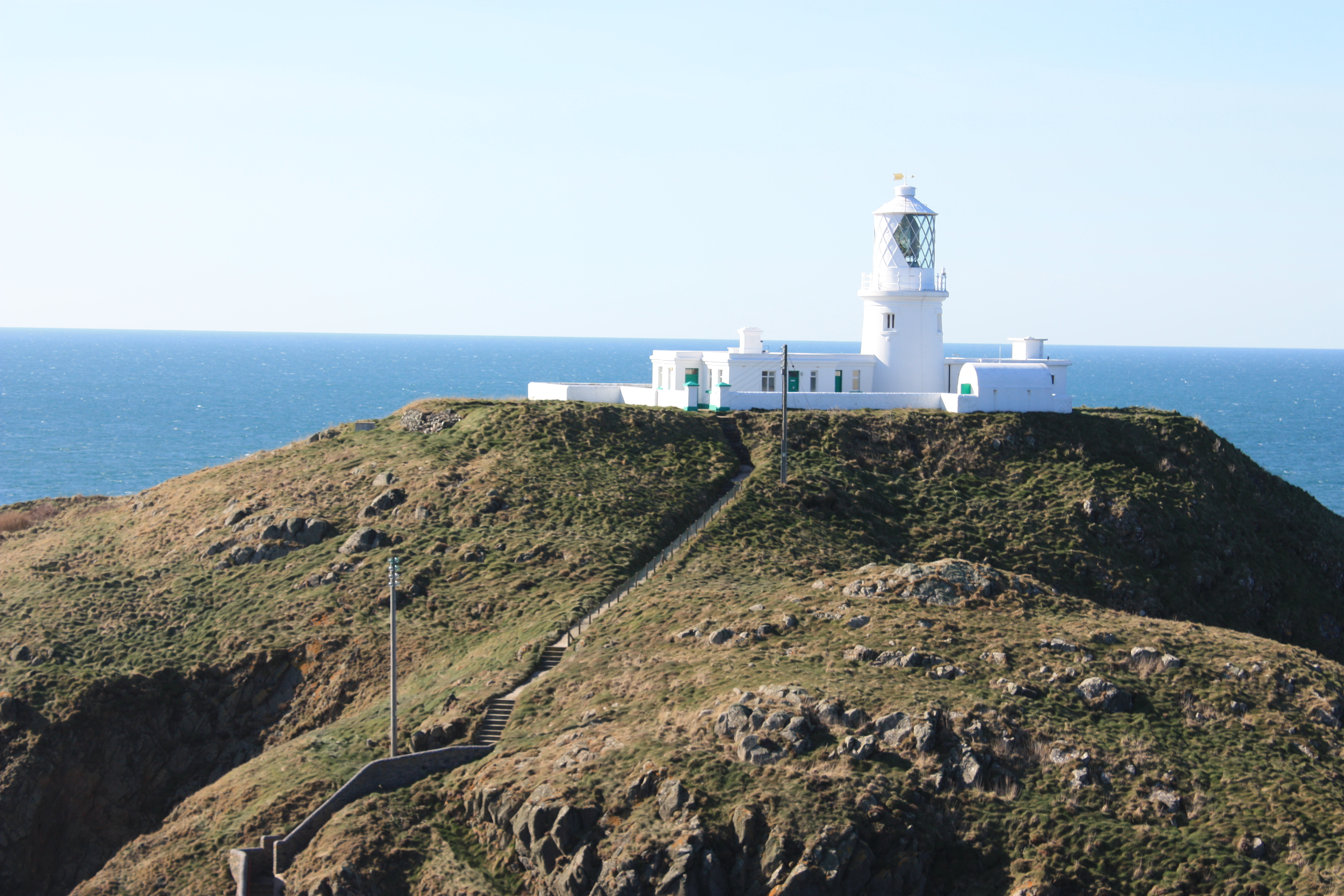
- Strumble Head Lighthouse
- Location: St Michael's Island, Strumble Head, Pembrokeshire, Wales
- Coordinates: 52.02975°N 5.07381°W

Tower
- Constructed: 1908
- Construction: stone tower
- Automated: 1980
- Height: 17 m (56 ft)
- Shape: cylindrical tower with balcony and lantern
- Markings: white tower and lantern
- Operator: Trinity House
- Heritage: Grade II listed building

Light
- Focal height: 45 m (148 ft)
- Lens: 1st Order catadioptric
- Intensity: 1,000,000 candela
- Range: 26 nmi (48 km; 30 mi)
- Characteristic: Fl (4) W 15s.

Strumble Head Lighthouse stands on Ynys Meicel (from Welsh: St. Michael's Island), also known as Strumble Head, a rocky island at the northwest corner of Pencaer area, five miles west of the town of Fishguard, in northern Pembrokeshire, Wales.

== History ==
The present lighthouse was erected in 1908, but the first proposal to build a lighthouse here was made in 1825 by Trinity House. The lighthouse replaces a light-vessel previously moored in the south of Cardigan Bay. The lighthouse is similar in construction to Skokholm Lighthouse and is among the last lighthouses to be built in Britain.

The circular stone tower is 55 ft high and still contains the original lantern complete with Fresnel lens manufactured by Chance Brothers, using a mercury bath as a low-friction bearing. Illumination was updated from paraffin to electricity in 1949. The Lighthouse was fully electrified in 1965. The Lighthouse was fully automated in 1980 and is now monitored from the Trinity House Operations Control Centre at Harwich with regular visits made by an attendant.

A plaque in the lantern-room is inscribed with a verse from Psalm 127:

Except the Lord Build the house
They labour in vain that build it
Except the Lord keep the city
The Watchman waketh but in vain

Under the lantern room sits a water tank which was used to store rainfall for use in the lighthouse's accommodation. The Lighthouse was reached by an iron bridge, and a handrail on the bridge and steps formed part pipe siphoning fuel mainland. Parts of the apparatus still survive. The bridge was replaced in 1963. An electric fog-signal was installed in 1969, replacing the previous system that used explosive signal charges. Stores were transferred from the mainland by cable but now largely arrive by helicopter and a helipad is found to the west of the lighthouse.

Those familiar with transatlantic aviation may recognize the name from Strumble VOR.

== See also ==
- List of lighthouses in Wales
- Strumble Head
- Strumble Head - Llechdafad Cliffs, a Site of Special Scientific Interest on which the lighthouse stands.

== Sources ==
- Loyd, T., Orbach, J., Scourfield, R., The Buildings of Wales: Pembrokeshire, Pevsner Architectural Guides, Yale University Press, 2004, ISBN 0-300-10178-3
- Hague, D., B., Lighthouses of Wales Their Architecture and Archaeology (Royal Commission on the Ancient and Historical Monuments of Wales, edited by Hughes, S., 1994) ISBN 1-871184-08-8
