= Maen Achwyfan =

Stone wheel-cross in Flintshire, Wales

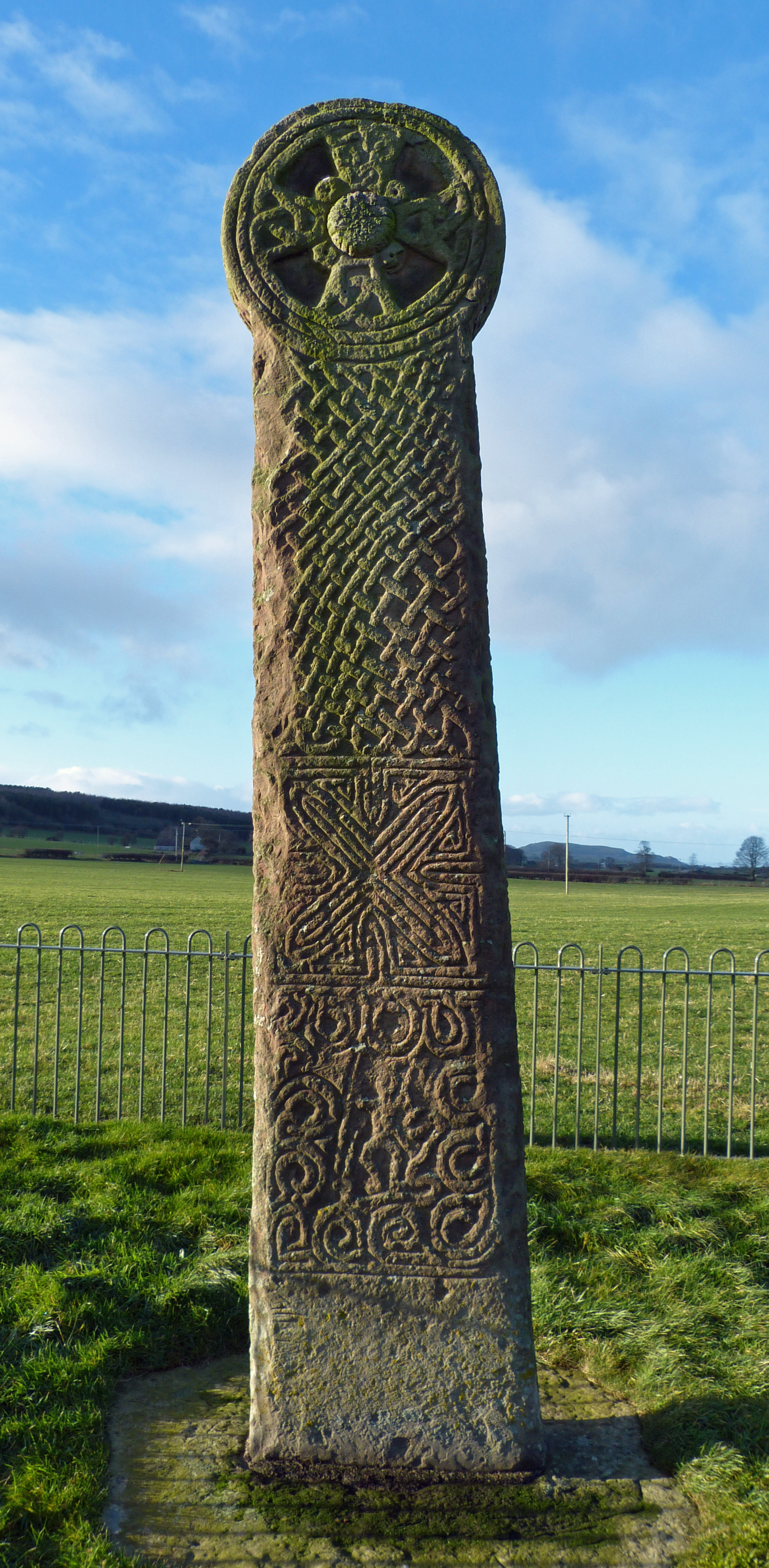
- "the tallest Wheel-Cross in Britain"

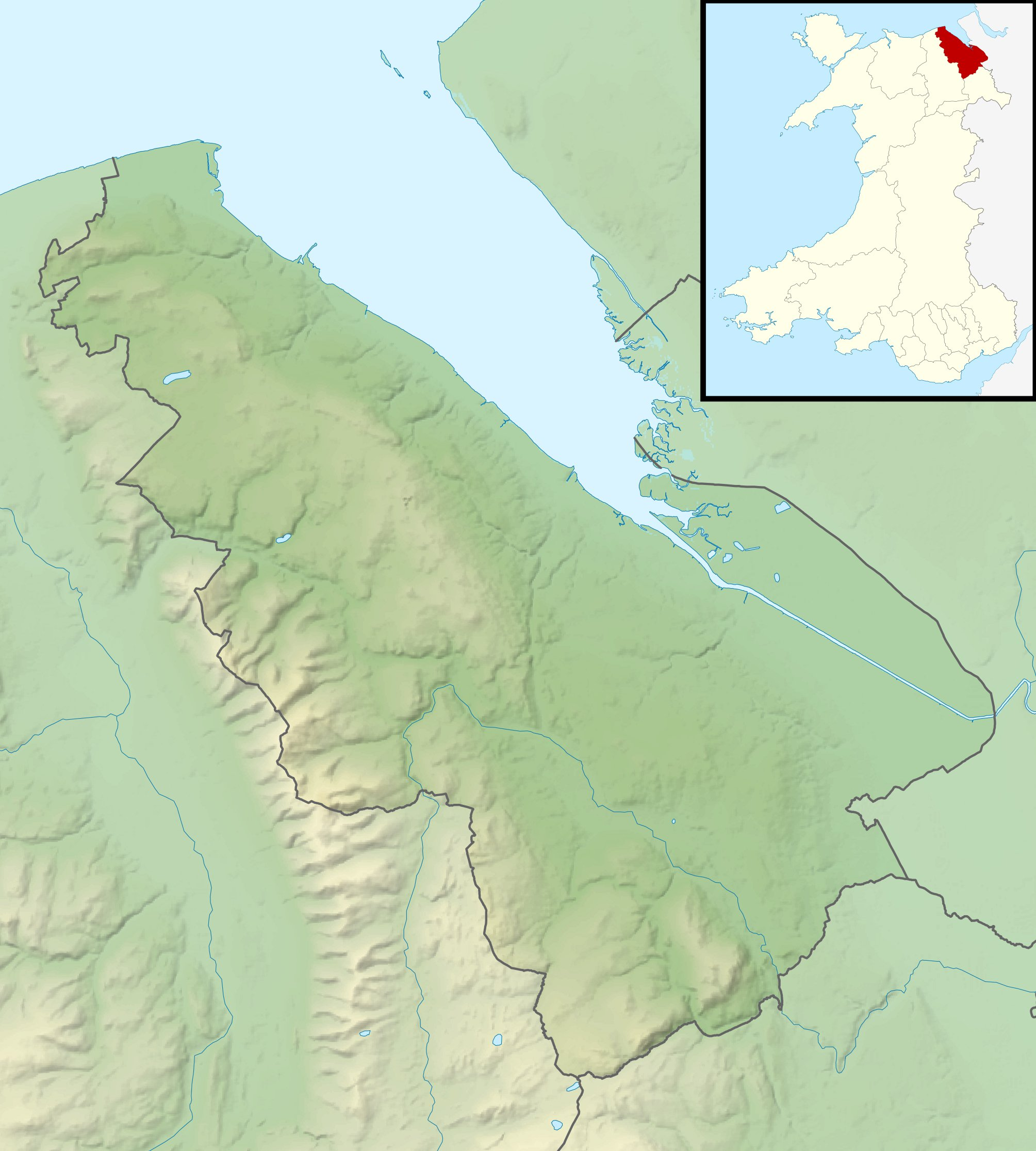
- Location within Flintshire
- 53.2986°N 3.30853°W
- Type: Stone wheel-cross
- Location: Whitford, Flintshire

History
- Built: 10th/11th century

Site notes
- Governing body: Cadw

Scheduled monument
- Official name: Maen Achwyfan
- Reference no.: FL005

Maen Achwyfan or Maen Achwyfan Cross (Welsh: Maen Achwyfan), located near the village of Whitford in Flintshire, Wales, is a high cross. Standing 3.4 metres (11 ft) high, it is the tallest wheel cross in Britain, and is a scheduled monument.

== Description ==
The cross is situated to the north of the village of Whitford, standing on the plain near the hill of Garreg, adjoining Pen-yr-Allt. It is carved from a single block of stone and stands 3.4 m high, making it the "tallest wheel cross in Britain".

The alto-relievo wheel cross has bosses on both sides. The pillar's east side is the best preserved. It features a key pattern which forms an enclosed saltire cross; this sits above the figure of a naked man bending at the knees and stands on a snake-like creature which rears up to his left. He is holding a spear (or staff) in his right hand and possibly an axe in his left. The carving of an animal may also be seen around the side of the pillar next to the naked man. A different figure can be seen on the south side of the cross; this figure wears a short tunic, holds a sword across his body and is set above a four- (or eight-) legged animal.

The rest of the pillar is covered in elegant carvings; Celtic knots, chequered patterns, fretworks, wreathing and foliage are found on all sides in high relief and of remarkable workmanship, although as of 2003 the figurative images are "now barely discernible".

== Name ==
At the end of the 18th century, the cross was near the family home of the writer and antiquarian Thomas Pennant, who was well-acquainted with ancient antiquities of the area, considered the stone to have been a sacred pillar and linked it with the Bronze Age barrows found in the landscape surrounding the cross. Pennant wrote that the name Maen Achwyfan was "in all probability, from the penances which were often finished before such sacred pillars, attended with weeping and the usual marks of contrition". He therefore translated the name as "Stone of Lamentation" and not "the Stone of Saint Cwyfan".

By the late nineteenth century Pennant's derivation of the name was seen as erroneous. Elias Owen stated that the word "Achwyfan" was coined by Pennant to suit his derivation of the name"; he noted that Edward Lhuyd referred to the stone as "Maen y Chwyvan", and that he recorded a 1388 spelling of the stone as "Maen Chufan". Owen visited the area and spoke to local inhabitants who referred to the cross as "Chwyfan" and not "Achwyfan" without exception. Today, Cadw gives the translation of Maen Achwyfan as "the stone of Saint Gwyfan" and it is likely that the name is a lenition of the personal name Cwyfan. Owen stated that the proper translation was "The Stone of Saint Cwyfan", and linked the stone to a 7th-century Welsh saint possibly linked to the Irish saint Kevin of Glendalough. Elias also noted that the prefix "Maen" (stone) instead of "Croes" (cross) and the crosses engraved upon it suggest that the monument's origins predate the Viking age.

== History ==
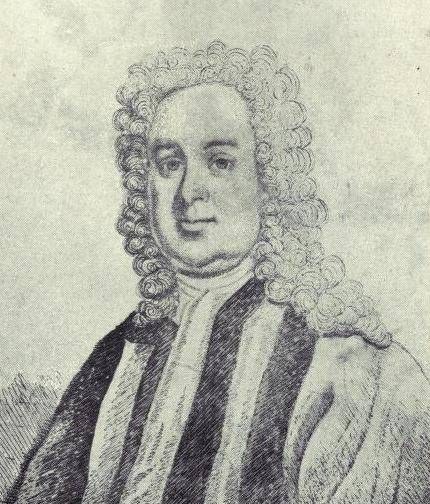
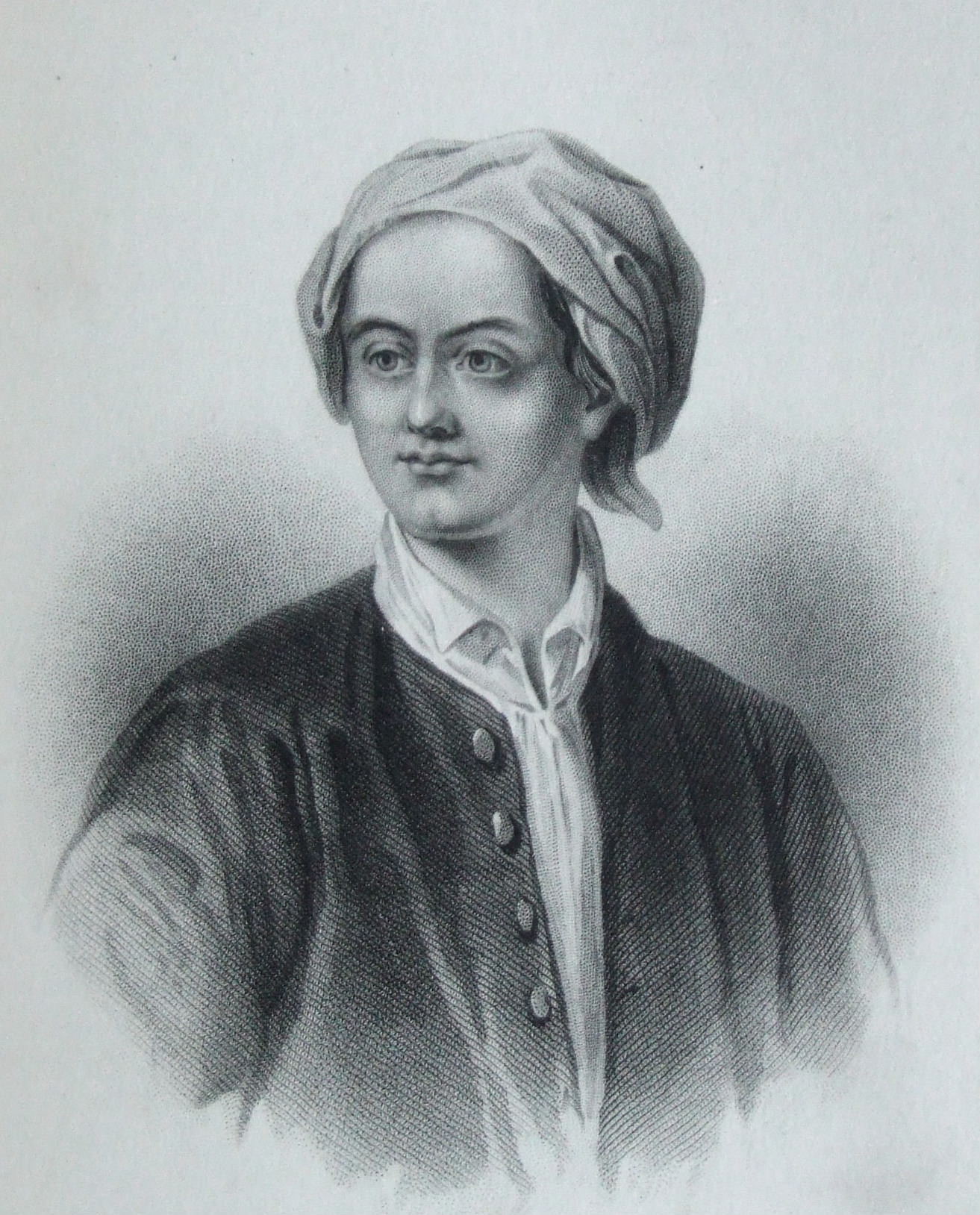
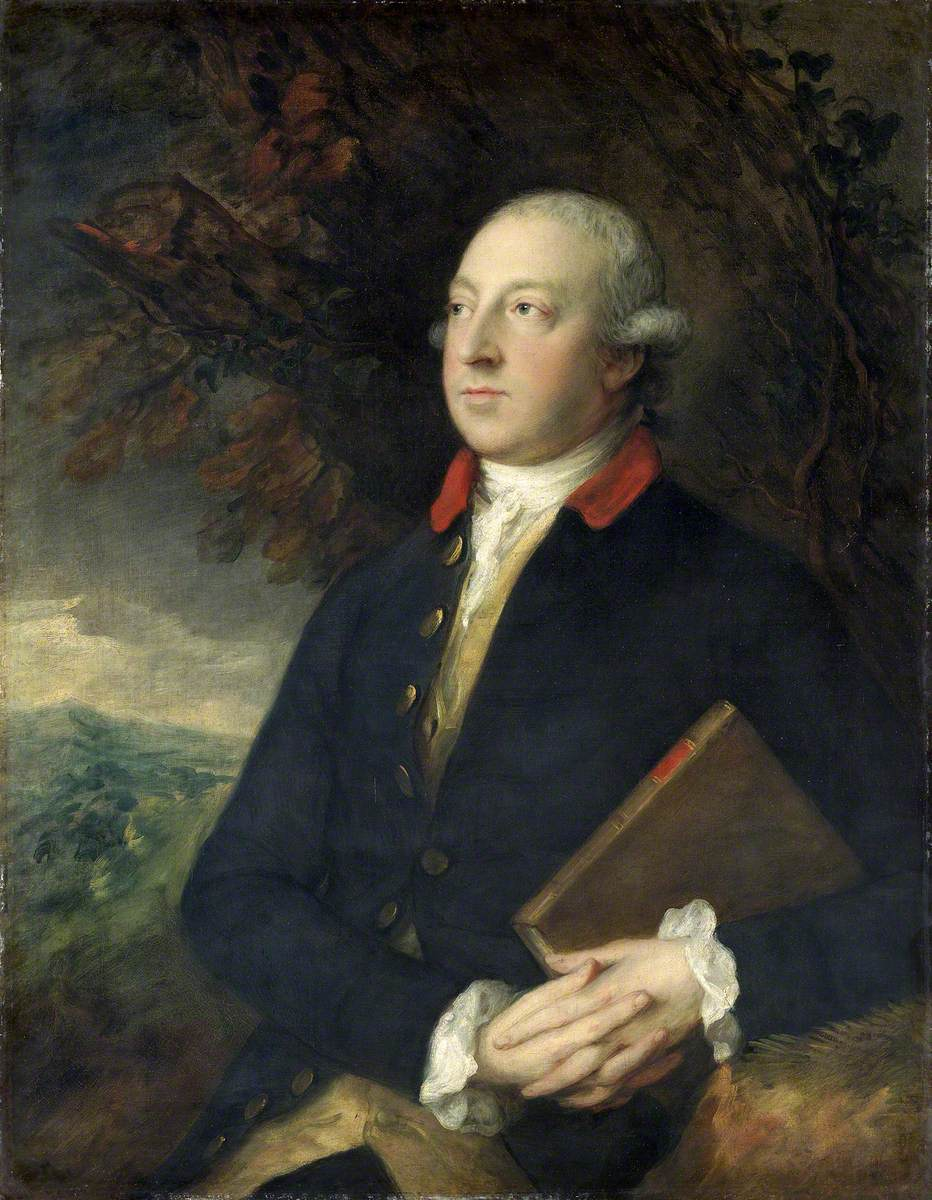
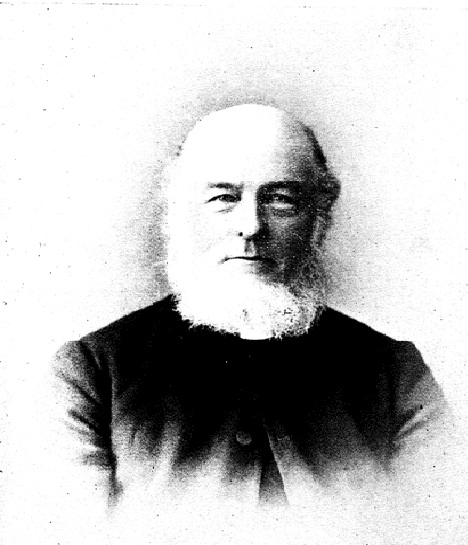
Descriptions of Maen Achwyfan were recorded by the antiquarians Edward Lhuyd, Lewis Morris, Thomas Pennant and Elias Owen, but its origins remain the subject of debate.

Both the age and purpose of the cross is a matter of debate. However, the name maen may imply that the stone was in situ before the Viking Age, as it derives from the Brythonic language magno-, a word that commonly denotes a stone of significance and is more usually associated with Christian stones erected in Wales during the early medieval period.

The first reference to the cross in English texts is by the antiquarian Edward Lhuyd, who provided a description of notable Welsh antiquities for Edmund Gibson's 1695 edition of William Camden's Britannia. This description suggested that the cross was erected as a monument on the spot of a great battle, linking the cross to the twenty barrows and tumuli in the locality. Lhuyd notes the contemporary excavations of these barrows which revealed many bodies bearing the marks of injuries inflicted by weapons of war. However, Lhuyd also argued that the cross had "been erected by the Danes" and likened its artwork to that of a similar cross at Bewcastle in Cumberland.

In the mid-eighteenth century Lewis Morris noted the unusualness of the designs on Maen Chwyfan, but suggested that the artefact was erected sometime earlier than the Viking period, in commemoration of Saint Chwyfan. Chwyfan is the eponymous saint at Llangwyfan, Anglesey whom Morris further linked to Cwyfen ap Brwyneu Hen.

Elias Owen also argued that Maen Achwyfan's most likely origins were in the pre-Viking age, suggesting the eighth century as the most likely date. Owen noted the etymology, the archaeology of religious sites in the area and the similarities in its design with crosses in Ireland, Russia and Greece. Owen also concurred with Morris that the Cross commemorated "an obscure saint named Cwyfan".

The name, origin and purpose of the cross continued to divide opinion in the twentieth century. Edward Hubbard, in his Clwyd Pevsner, suggests that the cross was of a much later date, suggesting the late 10th or early 11th century. Today the cross is a scheduled monument in the care of Cadw, which describes the cross as "probably dating to the early medieval or medieval period" and derives the name as "Stone of (Saint) Cwyfan".

== See also ==
- Archaeology of Wales
- Wales in the Middle Ages
- Carew Cross
- St Brynach Cross

== Sources ==
- Hubbard, Edward (2003). Clwyd: Denbighshire and Flintshire. The Buildings of Wales. New Haven and London: Yale University Press. ISBN 978-0-300-09627-9. OCLC 909280390.
