= Gribbin =

Gribbin is a surname of Irish origin. Notable people with the surname include:

- Basil Gribbin, Australian judge
- Ciaran Gribbin (born 1976), Northern Ireland musician
- Deirdre Gribbin (born 1967), Northern Ireland classical composer
- John Gribbin (born 1946), British science writer and astrophysicist
- Lulu Gribbin (born 2008), shark attack survivor and amputee advocate
- Vincent Gribbin (born 1965), English rugby league player
