= St Brynach Cross =

High cross in Pembrokeshire, Wales

Saint Brynach Cross
- Croes Sant Brynach
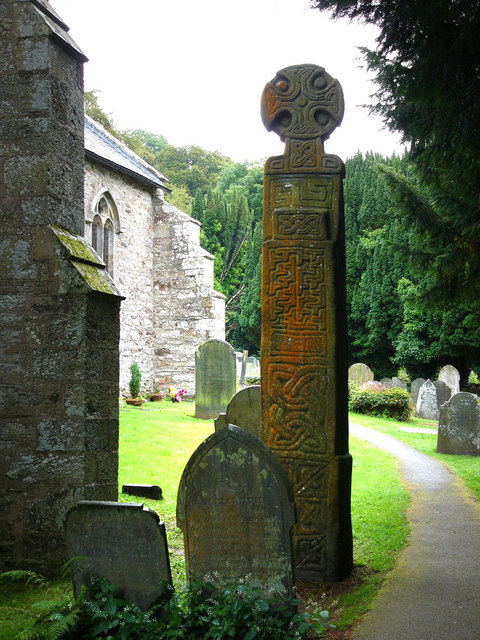
- Interactive map of Saint Brynach Cross
- Location: St Brynach Church, Nevern

The Saint Brynach Cross (Welsh: Croes Sant Brynach) or Nevern Cross (Welsh: Croes Nanhyfer) is a 10th or 11th century stone cross at St Brynach's church, Nevern.

== History ==
The cross is thought to date from the 10th or 11th century. Legend has it that the first cuckoo of the year in West Wales stands on the top of the cross and sings on the day of St Brynach's feast on the 7th of April.

The cross stands at 3.72m tall in the churchyard of St Brynach's Church and was first noted to be in its current position in 1603 by George Owen of Henllys.

The cross is made of Ordovician stone and of two separate pieces, the rectangular shaft and the cross-head.The cross shows interlaced and fret patterns carved into the rock which have viking influence. An inscription "DNS" on the western side of the cross translates as "Lord" and an inscription on the eastern face translates as "Hauen".

It is likely that both the Saint Brynach Cross and the Carew Cross were made in the same monastery workshop and date to the second half of the 10th century or early 11th century.

The Saint Brynach Cross, Carew Cross and Maen Achwyfan are considered the three outstanding high crosses of Wales.

== See also ==
- Archaeology of Wales
- Wales in the Middle Ages
- Carew Cross
- Maen Achwyfan Cross
