= Strumble Head - Llechdafad Cliffs =

Protected area in Pembrokeshire, Wales

- Site of Special Scientific Interest
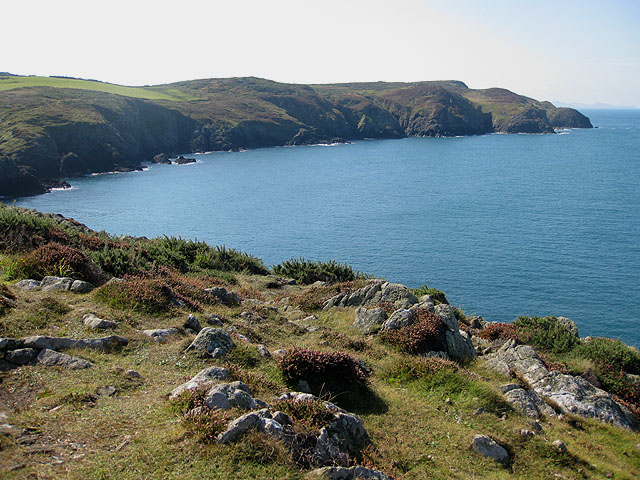
- Carreg Onnen Bay from Strumble Head.

- Location within Wales
- Location of Strumble Head - Llechdafad Cliffs.
- Area of search: Pembrokeshire
- Grid reference: SM8927538399
- Coordinates: 52.003927°N 5.0714756°W
- Interest: Biological and Geological
- Area: 204.63 ha (505.7 acres)
- Notification date: 1954

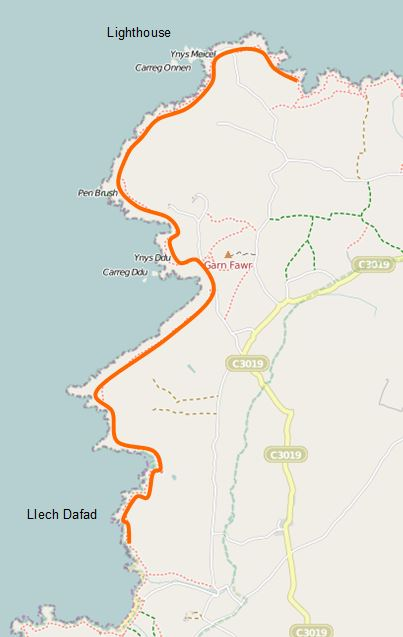
Map showing, in red, the extent and location of the Strumble Head - Llechdafad SSSI

Strumble Head - Llechdafad Cliffs is a Site of Special Scientific Interest (SSSI) in Pembrokeshire, South Wales. It has been designated as a SSSI since January 1954 in an attempt to protect its fragile biological and geological elements.

The site, which runs along a coastal strip some six miles in length on the western edge of the Strumble Head promontory, broadly covers the area from Strumble Head Lighthouse (on Ynys Meicel) in the north to the cliff named Llech Dafad in Welsh ('sheep slab'), spelt as two separate words on Ordnance Survey maps, in the south. The SSSI has an area of 204.63 hectares. It is managed by Natural Resources Wales.

The nearest large settlement is the town of Goodwick, some four miles away, on the east side of the Strumble Head promontory.

== Features ==
This SSSI has been notified as being of both geological and biological importance. It has six special features:

- Maritime cliffs, ledges, and crevices
- Coastal grassland
- Coastal heath
- Dry heath
- Rare plants
- Geology: Ordovician igneous and associated rocks

This diversity of habitats supports a wide range of species, including the chough and the small blue butterfly.

== See also ==
- List of Sites of Special Scientific Interest in Pembrokeshire
