= Tregwynt Mansion =

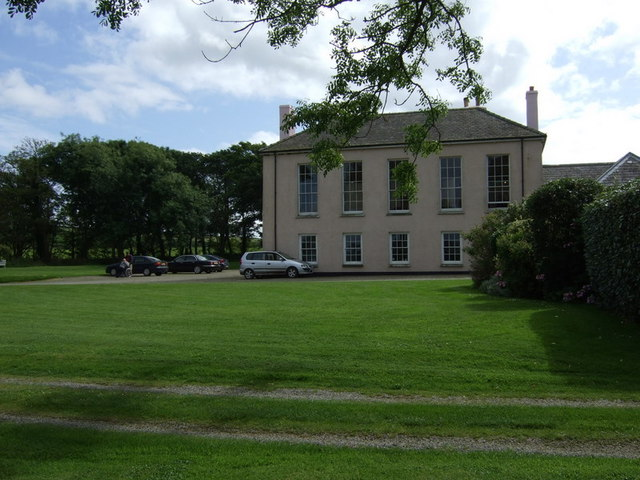
- North elevation

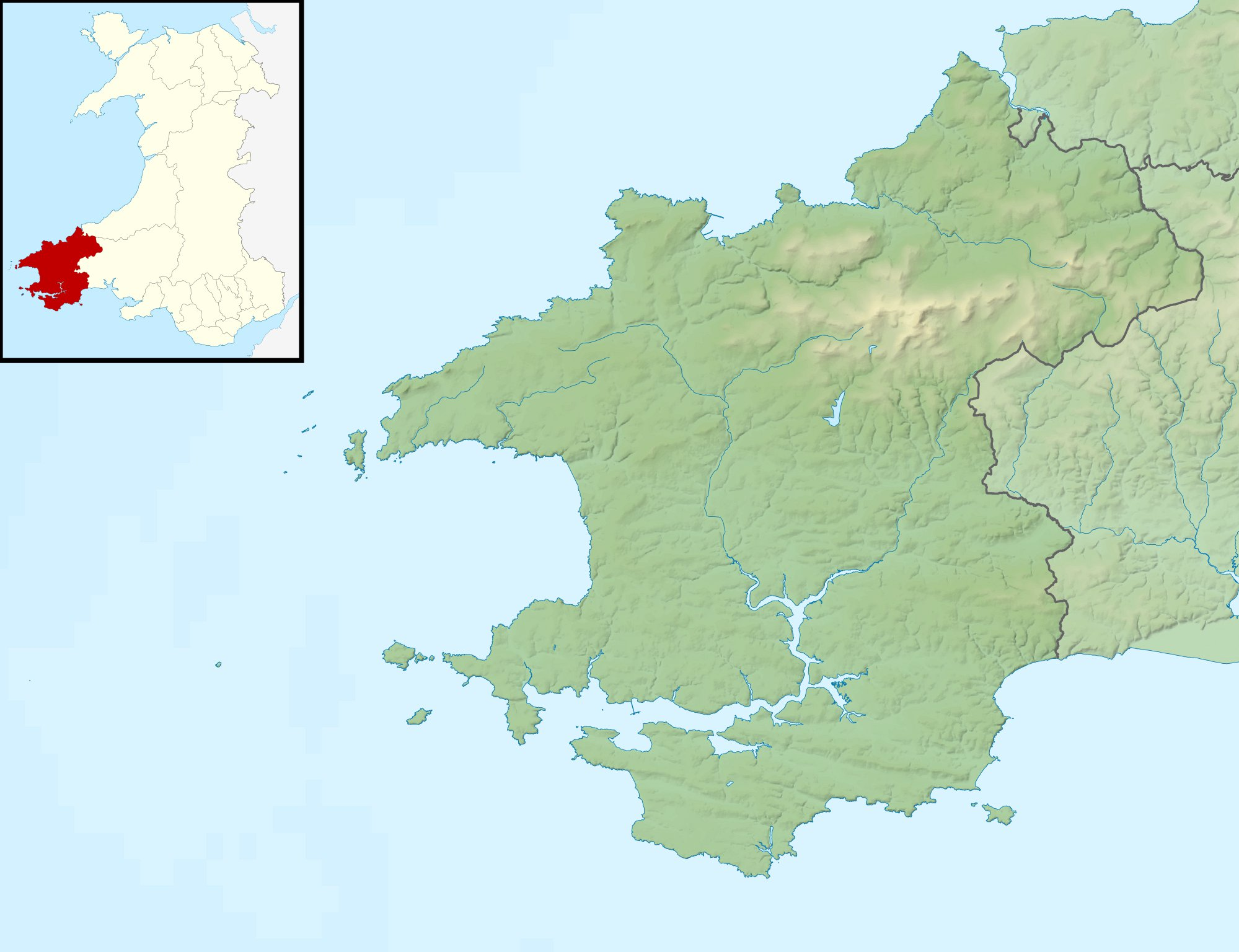
- Location within Pembrokeshire

General information
- Type: House
- Location: Granston, Pembrokeshire, Castlemorris, Haverfordwest, Pembrokeshire SA62 5UU, Wales
- Coordinates: 51.969769°N 5.073552°W

Technical details
- Floor count: 2

Design and construction
- Designations: Graded II*
- Known for: Tregwynt Hoard

Tregwynt Mansion is a house in the parish of Granston in Pembrokeshire, Wales. The Tregwynt Hoard was found during renovations in 1996.

== Location ==
Tregwynt means "place of the winds". The building has an exposed position on the coast above Abermawr. Tregwynt is one of the oldest house sites in the north of Pembrokeshire, with records dating to the 14th century. For six centuries it was owned by the Harries family. The 1844 Topographical Dictionary of Wales says of Granston, the parish that contains Tregwynt, "It is intersected by the turnpike-road leading from Fishguard to St. David's, and is watered by a small stream, which, after flowing through it, falls into the sea near Aberbâch. ... The surrounding scenery is not distinguished by any peculiarity of feature, though from the higher grounds some good views are obtained over the [St. George's] Channel and the adjacent country."

== Building ==
The present Grade II*-listed manor house and outbuildings date from the 18th century. The building is a plain two-story house with an L-plan, faced with yellow ochre roughcast. The roofs are slate. There is a single-story farm wing attached to the west end. The six-window east entrance front with narrow sashes dates to the earlier part of the 18th century. The rear range, where an earlier stair-tower had stood, dates from the late 18th century or early 19th century. The owners decided to add a ballroom to the house in 1792. The large, plain hipped ballroom has five long windows above a low basement.

In the interior, the front range has low rooms with an oak roof. The rear has a pine roof. There are fluted arches with keystones on both floors, which originally led to the rear stair. The present stair hall to the rear was built in the early 19th century.

== History ==
From medieval times the estate was the property of the Harries family. James Harries, second son of John Harries of Tregwynt, married the daughter and heiress of Eynon Griffith of Trewissilt in 1640. He was the ancestor of the Heathfield branch of the family, headed in 1894 by George James Harries, resident at Priskilly.

During the English Civil War (1642–51), a hoard of coins was buried in a redware pot in an outbuilding of the mansion. The hoard was worth £51 9s, which at that time would have been a month's wages for fifty soldiers. Possibly it was buried by a member of the Harries family in 1648 who was involved in the local conflicts of the Second Civil War. The owner of the Tregwynt estate at the time was Llewellin Harries, who died in 1663. He was a prominent landowner who named ten children in his will (dated 1659) but may have had others who did not survive him. He may have had royalist sympathies, but he avoided the fines levied on royalists after the war. It is not known why the treasure was not later recovered.

In the 18th century the Harries family of Tregwynt Mansion owned land from just above Fishguard to beyond Mathry. This included the Dyffryn (Valley) Mill, now the Melin Tregwynt. In January 1737 George Harries of Tregwynt was appointed Sheriff of Pembrokeshire.

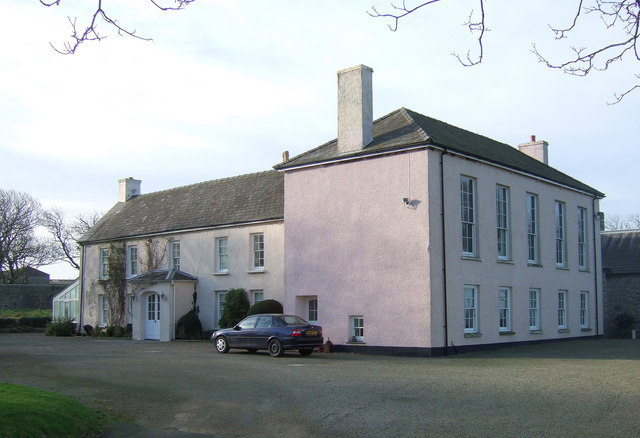
Ballroom (foreground)

On the night of 22 February 1797 Mrs. Harries was entertaining the local gentry in the ballroom of Tregwynt Mansion. An invasion force of 1,400 troops dispatched by the French Directory landed on the beach near Llanwnda beach near Fishguard that night. Colonel Knox, who commanded the local militia, was a guest at a ball at Tregwynt that day when the event was interrupted by a messenger from the fort at Fishguard that the French had landed an invasion force. He left at once for the fort where his men were preparing to engage the enemy, but as the light was failing he decided to wait until the next day when John Campbell, 1st Baron Cawdor, would arrive with reinforcements from Haverfordwest. The two militia met up the next day and Cawdor, an experienced soldier, took command. The French were disorganized and demoralized, and surrendered to Cawdor on the 24th. The incident has been called the Battle of Fishguard.

The Harries family sold the Tregwynt estate in 1830. Richard Llewelyn owned the Tregwynt estate in 1841 according to the Tithe Map. The previous year Richard Llewellyn of Tregwynt was appointed Sheriff of Pembrokeshire. Richard Llewellin died on 24 March 1871 and was succeeded by his nephew, Richard Llewellin Purcell. Mr. Purcell-Llewellin of Tregwynt played an important role in breeding a line of "English" setters. The Harries family brought the property back in 1877, but later sold it again.

In 1996 the lawn outside the ballroom was taken up so a tennis court could be installed. A local metal detectorist was given permission to search for buried metal before the court was laid down, and discovered a hoard of 33 gold and 467 silver coins. He was given full value for the hoard, which is now held by the National Museums & Galleries of Wales in Cardiff. It includes coins minted for Edward VI, Philip and Mary, Elizabeth I, James I, Charles I, and the government of the Commonwealth of England.

The present owners let the ballroom be used for events such as art exhibitions, concerts, plays and recitals. For example, in February 2015 the Fishguard Arts Society staged a miniature recreation of the Battle of Fishguard in the ballroom.

== Sources ==
- Bulletins of State Intelligence, F. Watts, 1840
- Burke, Bernard (1894), A Genealogical and Heraldic History of the Landed Gentry of Great Britain & Ireland, Harrison
- Clarke, Laurence; Butler, Samuel (1737-01-18), Exposition on the Common prayer
- Coleman-Phillips, Ceri (17 February 2015), "War games and music at Tregwynt Mansion", Western Telegraph
- History, Melin Tregwynt
- Johnson, Ben (2013), "The Last Invasion of Britain", Historic UK
- Lewis, Samuel (1844), A Topographical Dictionary of Wales: Comprising the Several Counties, Cities, Boroughs, Corporate and Market Towns, Parishes, Chapelaries, and Townships, with Historical and Statistical Descriptions: Embellished with Engravings of the Arms of the Cities, Bishoprics, Corporate Towns, and Boroughs; and of the Seals of the Various Municipal Corporations. With an Appendix Describing the Electoral Boundaries of the Several Boroughs, as Defined by the Late Act: Also Illustrated by Maps of the Different Counties, and a Map of North and South Wales, S. Lewis
- Lloyd, Freeman (2013-04-16), All Setters: Their Histories, Rearing & Training (A Vintage Dog Books Breed Classic - Irish Setter / English Setter / Gordon Setter), Read Books Limited, ISBN 978-1-4446-5970-2
- Lloyd, Thomas; Orbach, Julian; Scourfield, Robert (2004), Pembrokeshire, Yale University Press, ISBN 978-0-300-10178-2
- Royal Commission on Ancient and Historical Monuments in Wales (30 April 2000), An Inventory of the Ancient Monuments in Glamorgan, RCAHMW, p. 409, ISBN 978-1-871184-22-8
- Snodgrass, Mary Ellen (2003-08-26), Coins and Currency: An Historical Encyclopedia, McFarland, ISBN 978-1-4766-1120-4
- The 'legendary' treasure of Tregwynt, Amgueddfa Cymru – National Museum Wales, 17 April 2007
- "Tregwynt", British listed buildings
- "Tregwynt Mansion", The List
- "Tregwynt: place of the winds", UK Beaches Guide, archived from the original on April 5, 2016
- Wansey, Arthur H. (1871), "Richard Llewellin, Esq., Deceased", The London Gazette, T. Neuman
- Watkins, Graham (2014-08-16), Welsh Legends and Myths, Lulu.com, ISBN 978-1-291-98527-6
