= Jayne Pierson =

Welsh fashion designer

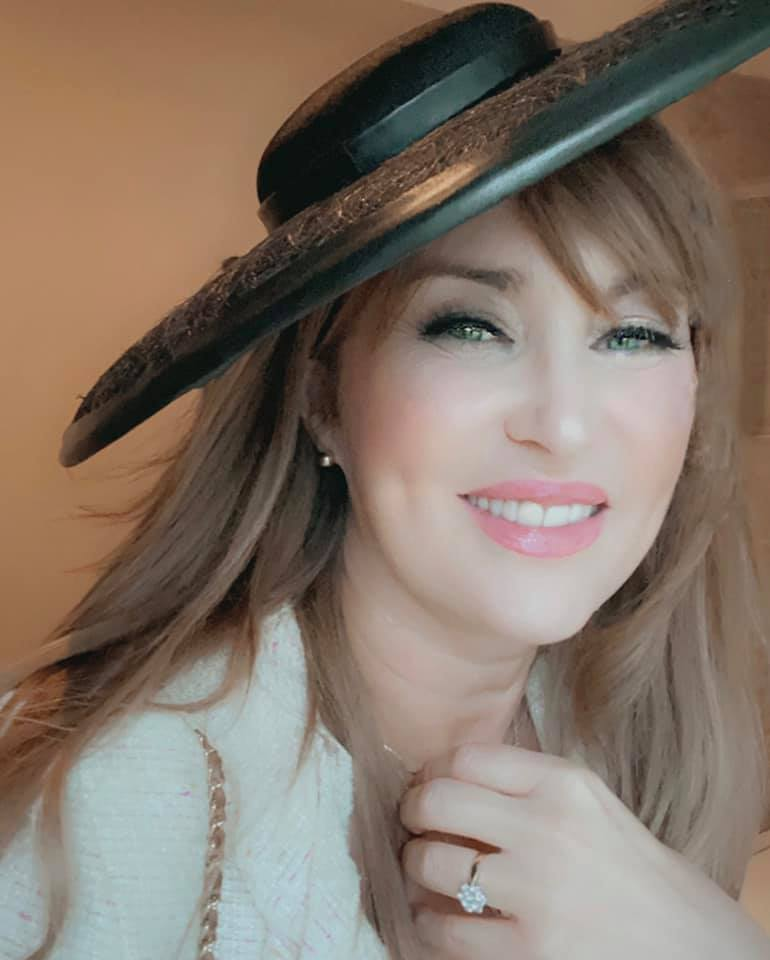
- Born: Swansea, Wales
- Education: West Wales School of the Arts, Central Saint Martins College of Art and Design
- Occupation: Fashion designer
- Label: Jayne Pierson Ltd.
- Awards: London Graduate Fashion Week Ecological Design Award

Jayne Pierson is a Welsh fashion designer. She launched her début collection with On|Off at London Fashion Week in September 2009. She has designed for Alexander McQueen and Vivienne Westwood. Her speciality is designing fashions for artists and actors.

== Early life ==
Pierson was born in Carmarthenshire, and raised in Dallas, Texas. She graduated with a BA Honours degree in Drama from the University of Kent and later went to the West Wales School of the Arts, University of Glamorgan and graduated with a first class BA Honours degree in Fashion Design. She also combined additional units of study from Central Saint Martins College of Art and Design, London. She won the London Graduate Fashion Week Ecological Design Award.

== Professional life ==
Pierson designed for Alexander McQueen. She also designed for Vivienne Westwood, who also offered her a position as a Design Assistant. Pierson stated that she greatly admires McQueen, Vivienne Westwood, Yves Saint Laurent and Mugler.

Pierson showcased her debut collection at On|Off, London Fashion Week in September 2009. When she showed her 2012 collection in 2011, she used ballerinas instead of models for her "directional, luxury" line of womenswear. In 2012, she created a line of bespoke womenswear for Welsh fashion brand Melin Tregwynt. Pierson's 2013 London Fashion Week presentation was accompanied by a short film she created. She was listed as one of the Vogue Italia talents in 2010, 2011 and 2012.
