= Coleton Fishacre =

Country house in Devon, England

Coordinates: 50.346707°N 3.534766°W

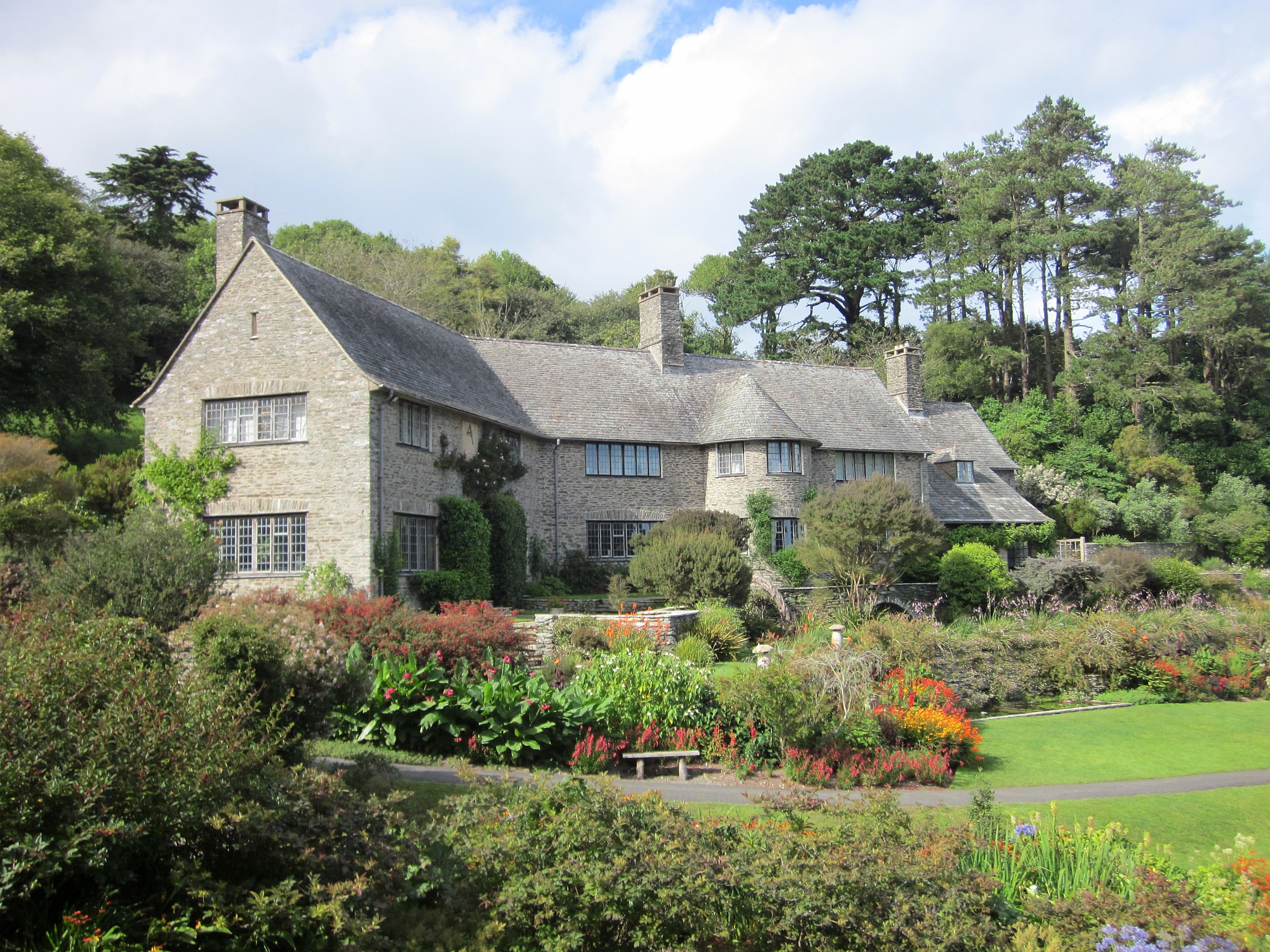
House at Coleton Fishacre

Coleton Fishacre is a property consisting of a 24-acre (97,000 m^{2}) garden and a house in the Arts and Crafts style, near Kingswear in Devon, England. The property has been in the ownership of the National Trust since 1982.

== The house ==
The house at Coleton Fishacre was built as a country home for Rupert D'Oyly Carte and his wife, Lady Dorothy Carte, between 1923 and 1926. The architect was Oswald Milne, a former assistant to Edwin Lutyens, who designed the house with the principles of the Arts and Crafts Movement in mind: simplicity of design and quality of craftsmanship. The influence of this older movement notwithstanding, the house is influenced by its own time, especially in its Art Deco interior. The structure is built of local slate rubble with a Delabole slate roof. The design has been twice featured in Country Life magazine: 31 May 1930 and 25 October 2007, the latter of which shows full colour photos of the house (exterior and interior) and the gardens. The property runs down to the sea, where there are some outbuildings.

Although built as a country home, Lady Dorothy lived in the house as her primary residence by the later 1920s. After the Cartes' divorce in 1941, their daughter, Bridget D'Oyly Carte, took over the house, which her father, who lived in London, would visit for long weekends. She sold the house in 1949, after his death, to Rowland Smith, owner of the Palace Hotel in Torquay. Smith and his wife Freda kept up the property until his death in 1979. The house is a Grade II listed building.

== The garden ==
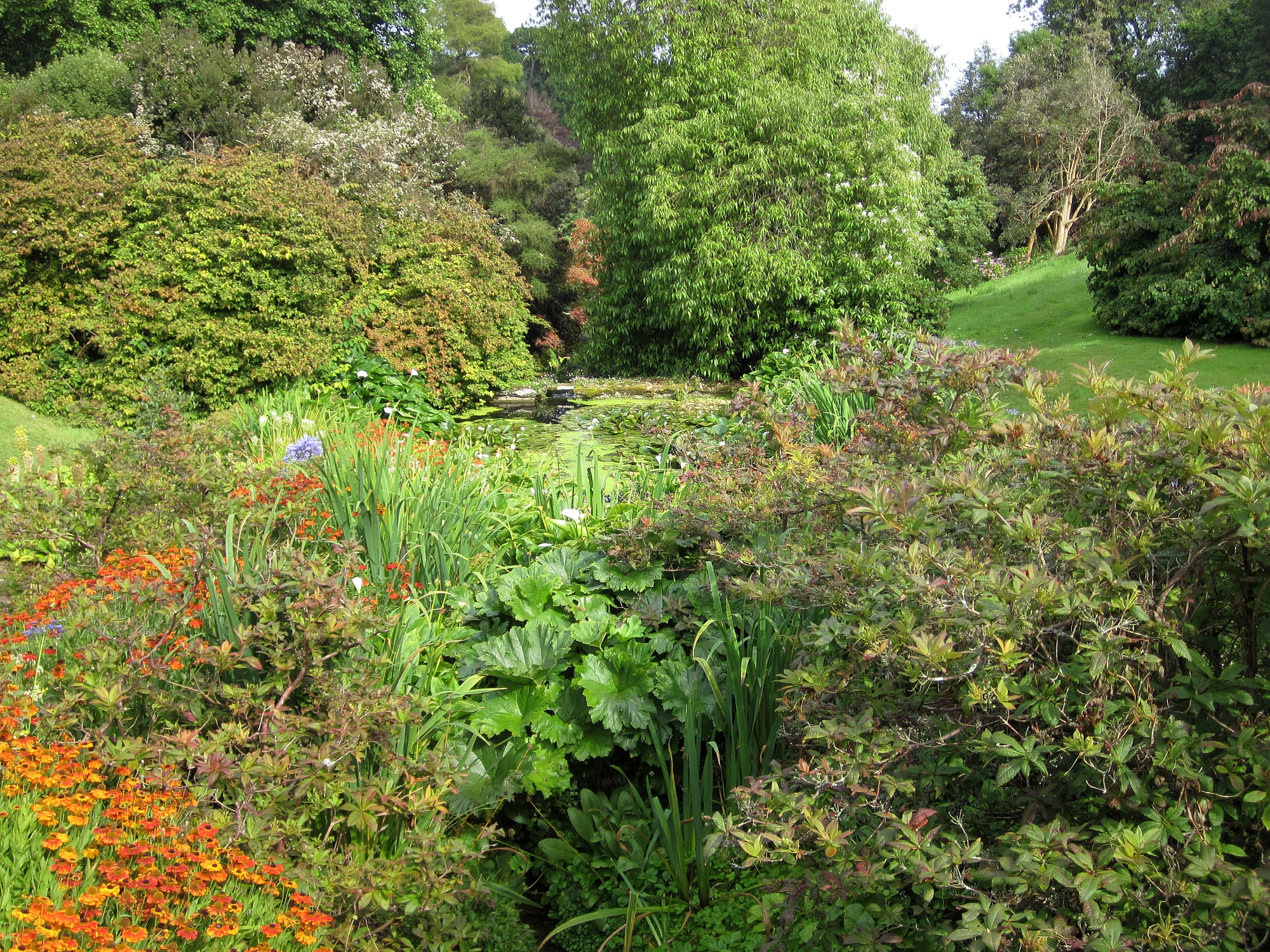
Garden at Coleton Fishacre

The garden at Coleton Fishacre runs down a narrow combe from the house to the sea at Pudcombe Cove. It was originally planted by Lady Dorothy and features rare and exotic plants, some of which are unusual in their ability to grow outside a subtropical climate due to the proximity of the Gulf Stream to this part of the coast of Devon. Lady Dorothy was noted for retrieving exotic plant species for the garden during her journeys abroad. The Cartes employed a staff of six to maintain the garden, compared with a staff of four to run the house. The garden is Grade II* listed in the National Register of Historic Parks and Gardens.

== National Trust ==
Coleton Fishacre was acquired by the National Trust in 1982 as part of its Project Neptune, with an eye to completing the South West Coast Path in that area. The garden was opened to the public immediately, while the house was let to tenants. The Trust finally opened the house to the public in 1999.

== See also ==
- D'Oyly Carte Opera Company
- Gilbert and Sullivan
