= Pencaer =

Coordinates: 52.0160°N 5.0148°W

- Community
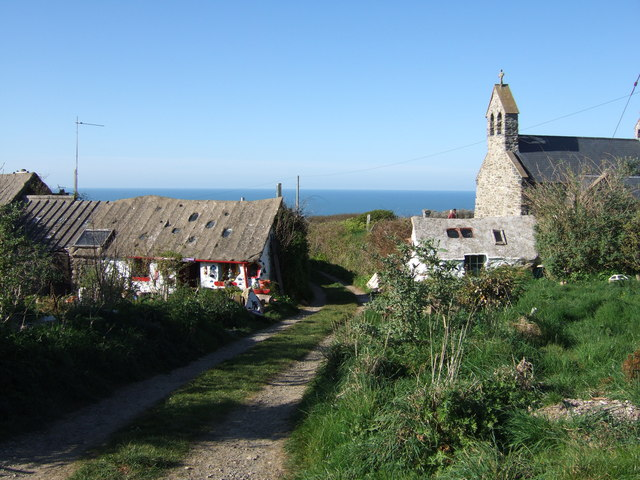
- Llanwnda, the largest village in the community

- Location within Pembrokeshire
- Principal area: Pembrokeshire
- Country: Wales
- Sovereign state: United Kingdom
- Police: Dyfed-Powys
- Fire: Mid and West Wales
- Ambulance: Welsh
- List of places UK Wales Pembrokeshire Map of the community

Pencaer is a community which covers an area of dispersed settlement in Pembrokeshire, Wales, on the peninsula of Pen Caer and comprises the village of Llanwnda and the smaller settlements of Granston, Llangloffan, St Nicholas (Tremarchog) and Trefasser. The population of the community taken at the 2011 census was 474.

== Features ==
=== Rocky coastline ===
Strumble Head lies within the community, as does part of the Pembrokeshire Coast National Park and a stretch of the Pembrokeshire Coast Path. Much of the community lies at 100 metres (330 ft) above sea level, and the coastline is largely rock cliff with caves and inshore islands. There are numerous sites indicating prehistoric occupation.

=== Pwll Deri ===
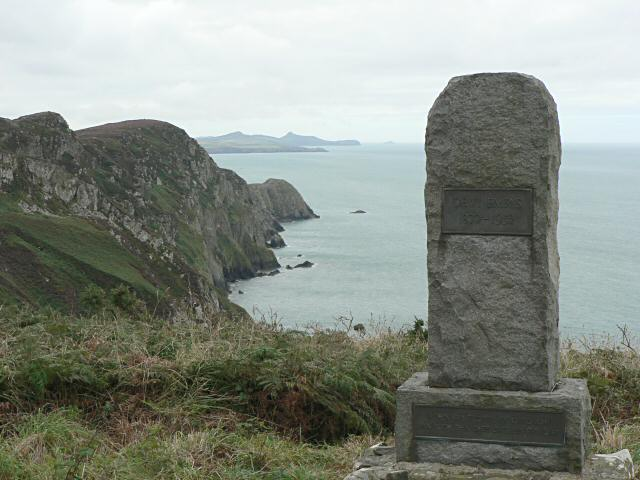
Memorial stone to Dewi Emrys

Pwll Deri is on the west Pencaer coast about 4 miles (6.4 km) from Goodwick (Welsh: Wdig) along the Pembrokeshire Coast Path. It sits on 400 feet (120 m) cliffs overlooking the bay (Pwll Deri in English is Pool of Oaks) to the west and has views of the Pembrokeshire Coast to as far away as St. David's. There is a Youth Hostel at Pwll Deri and a memorial to the poet Dewi Emrys who was inspired by Pwll Deri.

=== Listed buildings ===
There are 46 listed buildings in the community, three Grade II* and the remainder Grade II. Tregwynt Woollen Mill (Grade II) is in the southwest of the community; dating from 1819, its original purpose was to mill corn.

== Economy ==
Livestock farming predominates, particularly sheep, and cattle for milk production, as well as some cereals and potatoes, though production of early potatoes has all but ceased.

== Governance ==
Pencaer has a community council with six elected councillors: three for Llanwnda Ward (in the north) and three for St Nicholas Ward (in the south). The latter includes Granston. There are 11 monthly meetings (August excluded).

=== History ===
Prior to the abolition of parish councils in 1974, the area was governed by Llanwnda Parish Council, and the Granston and St Nicholas Parish Council; the latter's records are now held by Pembrokeshire County Council. These parish councils became communities, and in 1987 the two were combined to form Pencaer community.
