= Hubert William Lewis =

Recipient of the Victoria Cross

- Hubert William Lewis VC
- Born: 1 May 1896; Milford Haven, Pembrokeshire, Wales
- Died: 22 February 1977 (aged 80); Milford Haven, Pembrokeshire, Wales
- Burial place: Milford Haven Cemetery, Milford Haven
- Military career
- Allegiance: United Kingdom
- Branch: British Army
- Service years: 1914−
- Rank: Lance Corporal
- Nickname: Stokey
- Service number: 16224
- Units: Welch Regiment; Home Guard
- Conflicts: World War I
- Awards: Victoria Cross; Médaille militaire

Lance Corporal Hubert William Lewis VC (1 May 1896 – 22 February 1977) was a Welsh soldier and recipient of the Victoria Cross, the highest and most prestigious award for gallantry in the face of the enemy that can be awarded to British and Commonwealth forces.

Born in Milford Haven, he left school at 13 to work in a local fish market. He enlisted in the Welsh Regiment in 1914 and, after serving briefly in France, he was reposted to the Macedonian front of the First World War. During a night raid on German trenches, despite being wounded twice, he single-handedly captured three enemy soldiers before carrying a wounded officer back to safety under artillery fire. For his actions he was awarded the Victoria Cross, becoming the youngest Welsh recipient of the award. He later performed a similar feat when carrying a captain to safety in 1918 during an assault on an enemy position.

After the war, he returned to Milford Haven where he married and raised three children. He continued working in the local fish market, first as a trader before becoming the foreman for an ice company at the site for over 40 years. He served in the Home Guard during the Second World War. Prior to his death in 1977, he was the last surviving Welsh Victoria Cross recipient from the First World War.

== Early life ==
Lewis was born on 1 May 1896 in Robert Street in the coastal town of Milford Haven, Pembrokeshire. He was the second of four children born to Adrian Lewis, a brass moulder and fitter at Milford Haven docks, and his wife Sarah (née Broome). His father was known as "Stokey" Lewis and Hubert became known as "Young Stokey" as a child before taking on the original nickname as he grew older. The family later moved to 27 Dartmouth Gardens and Lewis attended Milford Haven National School as well as a Wesleyan Sunday School. After leaving school at the age of 13, Lewis went to work as a packer in the town's fish market for local businessman George Bradbury. A local newspaper reporter described him as an "unpredictable prankster" and recounted incidents where Lewis lightly nicked the reporter with a fish knife and where he once "swiped" the editor of the Western Telegraph with a hake. He also played amateur football for local side Milford Haven Stars.

== First World War ==
In early September 1914, 18-year old Lewis attended a recruitment meeting organised by a Major Birt, who was also his father's employer, which drew crowds of 2000–3000 people before enlisting in the 11th (Service) Battalion of the Welsh Regiment which had been formed little over a month before as the Cardiff Commercial Battalion, a pals unit. At 10 a.m. the next day, Lewis, was one of 75 local volunteers who left Milford Haven before being split into smaller groups with Lewis and 45 others travelling to Maindy Barracks in Cardiff, the rest joining the Royal Engineers or the Royal Artillery. Two days later, his unit was moved to Lewes as part of the 67th Brigade, part of the 22nd Division. He also underwent training at Eastbourne, Hastings, Aldershot and Seaford. It was at Aldershot where Lewis and his battalion were visited by King George V and Lord Kitchener. On 5 September 1915, just over a year after enlisting, Lewis and his unit sailed to Boulogne, France from Southampton. Several days after his arrival, he was attached to the 9th (Service) Battalion, Border Regiment, the 22nd Division's pioneer battalion, as a machine gunner.

=== Victoria Cross ===
Soon after, Bulgaria, which had been neutral since the war began, entered the war on the German side. Lewis's division was one of several that were removed from the Western Front and posted to Greece to prepare for a possible attack by enemy forces on the Macedonian front under the command of Lieutenant-General Bryan Mahon of the British Salonika Army. The force initially entrenched themselves in the Thessaloniki area in preparation for an attack but the decision was eventually made to launch an offensive against the enemy forces. On 17 October 1916, the order was given for Lewis' battalion to launch a raid on German trenches near Dorsale. However, bad weather delayed the attack for several days before it was eventually launched at 9 p.m. on 22 October. The battalion was split into four parties with Lewis assigned to "D" Party. During the initial rush, D Party was spotted by a German sentry after crossing only 300 yards (270 m) of ground, allowing the enemy forces to open fire with machine guns and artillery. They were targeted by "intense" shelling for 40 minutes during which Lewis received a wound to his arm. However, he turned away medical assistance after seeing more badly wounded men needing attention.

During a brief respite in the shelling, Captain Guthrie Morgan led a charge of around 150 men, including Lewis, into the German trenches where they were able to gain control after a period of hand-to-hand combat. During the fighting, Lewis received a second wound as the Germans attempted to counterattack but refused treatment for a second time. He continued through the enemy trench where he came across three German soldiers. Using his rifle butt and bayonet, Lewis briefly fought with the men before they surrendered to him, in an incident witnessed by Captain Morgan and another soldier.

The German forces launched another counterattack, this time successful, and Lewis and his battalion were ordered to retreat. In the descent back to their lines, Lewis heard the cries of a wounded officer, Lieutenant Turner, who was lying on the fire step of a trench, and, despite suffering from two wounds himself, carried the wounded man over his shoulder the rest of the way through enemy artillery fire. They reached safety at 4:30 a.m. the following morning at which point Lewis let down Turner before collapsing through exhaustion.

For his actions, Lewis was awarded for the Victoria Cross (VC). His award was announced on 15 December 1916 in The London Gazette, the citation reading:

For most conspicuous bravery and devotion to duty during a raid.

On reaching the enemy trenches Private Lewis was twice wounded, but refused to be attended to, and showed great gallantry in searching enemy dug-outs. He was again wounded and again refused attendance. At this point three of the enemy were observed to be approaching, and Private Lewis immediately attacked them single-handed, capturing all.

Subsequently, during the retirement, he went to the assistance of a wounded man, and under heavy shell and rifle fire brought him to our lines, on reaching which he collapsed.

Private Lewis showed throughout a brilliant example of courage, endurance and devotion to duty.

— The London Gazette, 15 December 1916"

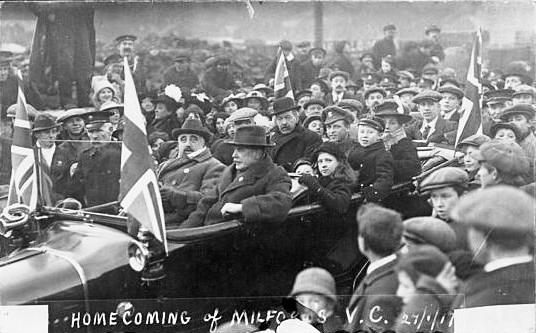
Lewis returning to Milford Haven

Lewis returned home in January 1917, attending a press conference at The Grand Hotel in Cardiff where he stated "I joined The Welsh Regiment as a raw recruit, and I am proud of the fact that I have not disgraced the honour and proud record of the regiment." He also corrected errors in the reporting of his actions, including the number of wounds he had received which had initially been reported as three. He later returned to his hometown Milford Haven, where he was given a gold watch, before receiving his VC from King George V at Buckingham Palace on 5 February 1917. At the age of 20, he was the youngest Welsh recipient of the award.

=== Later actions ===
Only ten days after being awarded his VC, Lewis returned to the front lines of the Balkans campaign. In June 1918, Lewis again received praise for his bravery under fire when he rescued Captain Morgan during an assault near Salonika. After seeing his captain fall, he rushed to his aid despite suffering the effects of poisonous gas and fighting off nearby Bulgarian troops. He then carried Morgan back to safety. Morgan later wrote to Lewis and stated "It is impossible for me to express how grateful I am to you for saving my life…You certainly deserve a Bar to your Victoria Cross." However, he was not put forward for the award, only one other soldier (Noel Godfrey Chavasse) received a second VC during the First World War. He was also awarded the Médaille militaire by France in July 1917. He was promoted to lance corporal on 16 April 1919.

== Later life ==
At the end of the hostilities, Lewis returned to his hometown Milford Haven and continued work at the fish market where he worked as a merchant before his employer went out of business during the 1920s. He took several jobs in order to earn a living before again returning to the fish market to work for the Milford Haven Ice Company, unloading delivery lorries. He eventually became the foreman for the company at the site where he worked for a further 43 years and was locally known by the nickname "VC Lewis".

Lewis married his fiancée, Edith Eveline Etherington, in Haverfordwest on 9 October 1920 and the couple had three sons, Edward, Vernon and Arthur. In 1921 he was asked to unveil the County of Pembroke War Memorial in Haverfordwest.

During the Second World War he served in the Home Guard and was given a Certificate of Good Service. One of his sons, Vernon, a flight sergeant in the RAF, was killed in a nighttime bombing raid over Germany in August 1943 at the age of 22; his Avro Lancaster was shot down by an enemy night fighter. Lewis subsequently received his son's posthumous Distinguished Flying Medal from King George VI in May 1946. He also suffered further loss during the 1960s when his grandson was accidentally killed by a reversing bus.

Lewis became active in the veteran community and was the vice-president of the Milford Haven branch of The Royal British Legion. He became friends with fellow VC recipient Ivor Rees. In 1964, the pair, along with another VC recipient, Edward Thomas Chapman, attended the film premiere of Zulu where they dined with Michael Caine. His wife Edith died in 1969. Lewis died eight years later in his hometown of Milford Haven on 22 February 1977 at the age of 80. He was buried in Milford Haven Cemetery with his wife. Prior to his death, he was the last surviving Welsh recipient of the Victoria Cross from the First World War.

Lewis's medals, including his VC, were sold at a Sotheby's auction in 1993 for £26,450. They were later bought by Lord Ashcroft in 1999 and his VC is on display in the Lord Ashcroft Gallery at the Imperial War Museum, London.

== Bibliography ==
- Ashcroft, Michael (2007) [2006]. Victoria Cross Heroes. London: Headline Review. ISBN 978-0-7553-1633-5.
- Buzzell, Nora, ed. (1997). The Register of the Victoria Cross. Cheltenham, Gloucestershire: This England Alma House. ISBN 0-906324-27-0.
- Gliddon, Gerald (2005). The Sideshows. VCs of the First World War. Gloucestershire: Sutton Publishing. ISBN 978-0-7509-2084-1.
