= Dilys Cadwaladr =

Welsh poet (1902–1979)

Dilys Cadwaladr (19 March 1902 – January 1979) was a Welsh-language poet and fiction writer. Her work also gained readers in English translation.

== First female crowned bard ==
Dilys Cadwaladr is notable for being the first woman to win the Crown at the National Eisteddfod of Wales. This she achieved in 1953 at Rhyl.

Her story "The Foolish Maid" appears in English translation in the collection My Heart on My Sleeve (Honno Welsh Women's Press, Aberystwyth, 2013), which remained in print in 2020. Earlier, her story "The Divorce" had appeared in English in 1928 in the periodical "The Welsh Outlook".

== Personal life ==
Cadwaladr had a close relationship with the elderly poet Dewi Emrys (1881–1952), by whom she had a daughter in 1930. Dilys Cadwaladr lived on Bardsey Island for several years in the 1940s, as a farmer and as the schoolteacher to the island's children.
