= Carew Cross =

Celtic cross in Pembrokeshire, Wales

- Croes Caeriw
- Interactive map of Carew Cross
- Location: Carew, Pembrokeshire
- Coordinates: 51.698034°N 4.827801°W
- Type: Celtic cross
- Material: Stone
- Height: 4 metres (13 ft)
- Completion date: 11th century

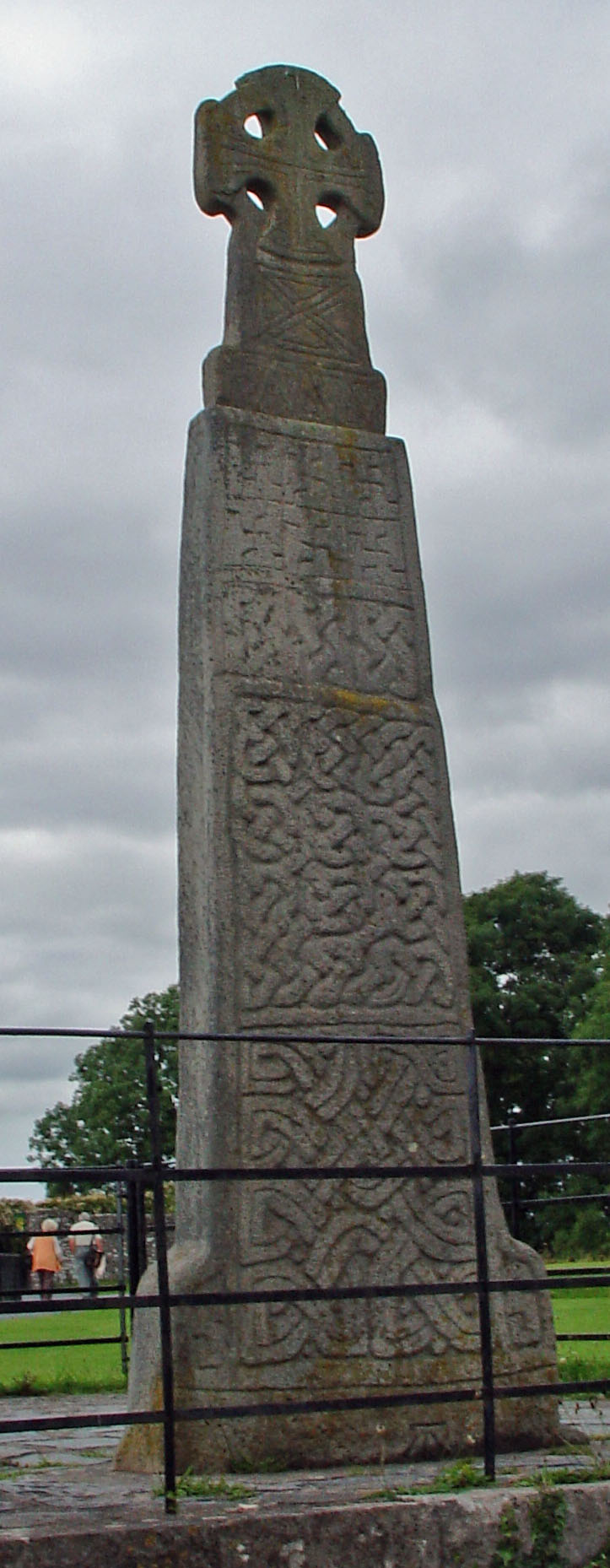
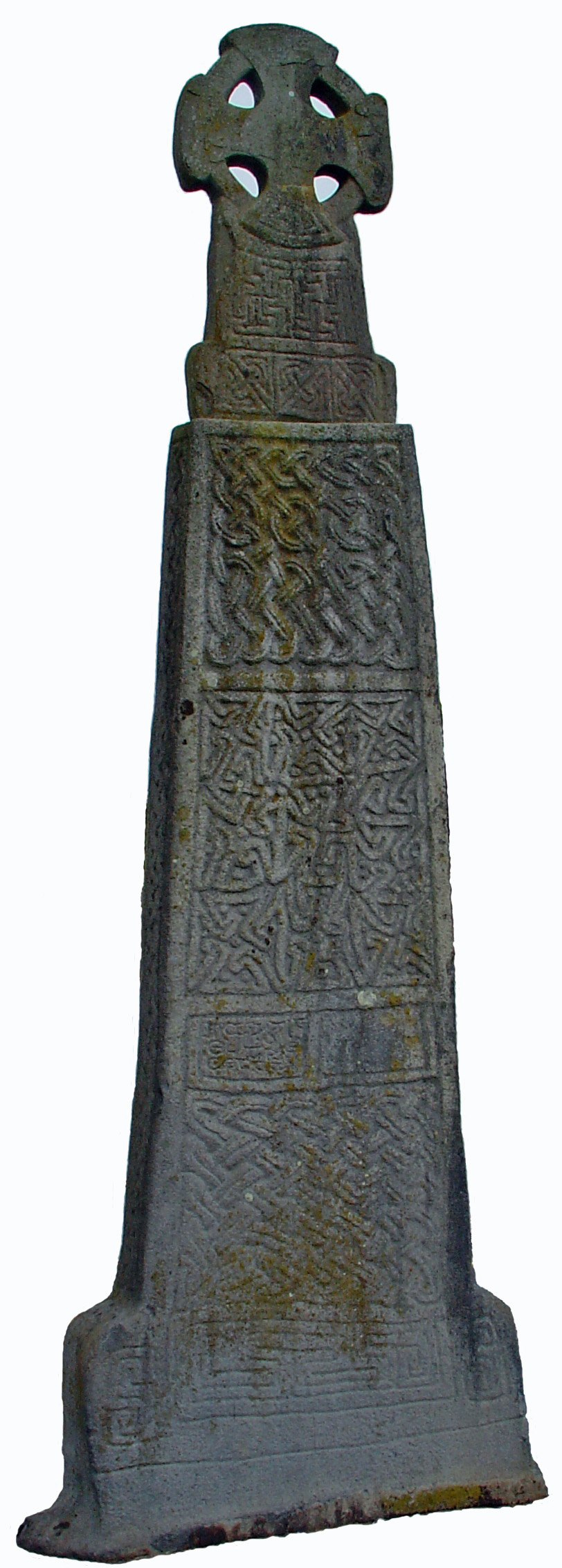
The Carew Cross east face (left) and west face (right)

Carew Cross (Welsh: Croes Caeriw) is an 11th-century Grade I listed monument in the village of Carew, Pembrokeshire, Wales.

== History ==
The cross is an important example of an 11th-century memorial Celtic cross and is believed to commemorate the brother of Hywel ab Edwin, Maredudd ab Edwin of Deheubarth, who died in 1035. The brothers were joint rulers of Deheubarth, and the cross is thought to date from around the time of Maredudd's death. It was first known to be placed in Carew, Pembrokeshire, from around 1690. The previous location for the stone is unknown. It is suspected that when it was moved to Carew, it was as ornamentation for nearby Carew Castle. The damage to the cross, where part of the stone has flaked away, occurred prior to 1690.

In 1811, the cross stood on a low plinth. The plinth was altered around 15 years later to align it with the newly lowered road. The top stone became dislodged in 1844, and it was re-set in the slot with lead. The cross was moved away from the road in 1925, and again during the Second World War, when it was relocated to the nearby castle for protection. Following the war, it was placed back by the roadside, but on at a new position.

The monument was Grade I listed on 14 May 1970; the reason description given was "Listed grade I as a characteristically Welsh composite cross and one of the finest early Christian monuments in Wales." It was the Carew Cross that inspired the symbol of Cadw.

== Description ==
It is similar in design to the cross at Nevern. It is inscribed, on the west face "MARGIT EUT REX ETG [uin] FILIUS" and otherwise decorated in abstract patterns. The cross is 4 metres (13 ft) tall and is in two parts, joined by a tenon joint. The top is Carmarthenshire sandstone and the lower portion is igneous-type stone from Preseli.

== See also ==
- Archaeology of Wales
- Wales in the Middle Ages
- St Brynach Cross
- Maen Achwyfan Cross
