= Dewi Emrys =

Welsh poet (1881–1952)

Dewi Emrys was the pen-name of the West Wales poet David Emrys James (28 May 1881 – 20 September 1952), who wrote in the Welsh language.

He was born at Majorca House in New Quay, Cardiganshire. His father, Thomas Emrys James, was a minister of the Congregational denomination at Llandudno, and Dewi's mother, Ellen (née Jones), was the daughter of a sea captain. The family moved to Fishguard, where the Reverend James took on another church, and Dewi Emrys attended a local county school. He became apprenticed to a local newspaper, the County Echo, and continued his training at The Carmarthen Journal when his family moved there in 1896; he soon became editor of its Welsh-language content. In 1903, he moved on to study at the Presbyterian College in Carmarthen and duly followed his father into the ministry.

For a time, he was minister at the Welsh Free Church, Liverpool, then moved to take over churches in Dowlais, Buckley, and Pontypridd. In July 1908, he married Cissie Jenkins, and they subsequently had two sons. In 1915, he became the minister of Finsbury Park church in London. However, he enlisted in the armed forces in 1917 during the First World War.

He won the crown at the National Eisteddfod of Wales in 1926. In 1929, he won the chair at the National, the first of an unequalled four wins, and he continued to win chairs in local eisteddfodau. Having abandoned the ministry, he lived a peripatetic life; one of his bardic chairs was left at the Eagle public house in Llanfihangel-ar-Arth, where he is said to have left it as payment for his bill. In 1936, he returned to journalism, writing for Y Cymro.

In later life, he was associated with two female Welsh-language poets, Dilys Cadwaladr and Eluned Phillips; the latter wrote a biography of Dewi Emrys. In 1930, Dilys had a daughter, Dwynwen ("Nina"), by Dewi. In the early 1940s he went to live with his daughter, in Talgarreg, Cardiganshire, joined the local Congregational church and began preaching again, although he did not return to the ministry.

A drama-documentary about the life of Dewi Emrys, Dewi Emrys: Cythraul yr Awen, was shown on S4C in 2014. A memorial to him can be seen near Pwllderi in Pencaer, Pembrokeshire, a place that was the inspiration for one of his best-known poems.
