= Oswald Milne =

British architect

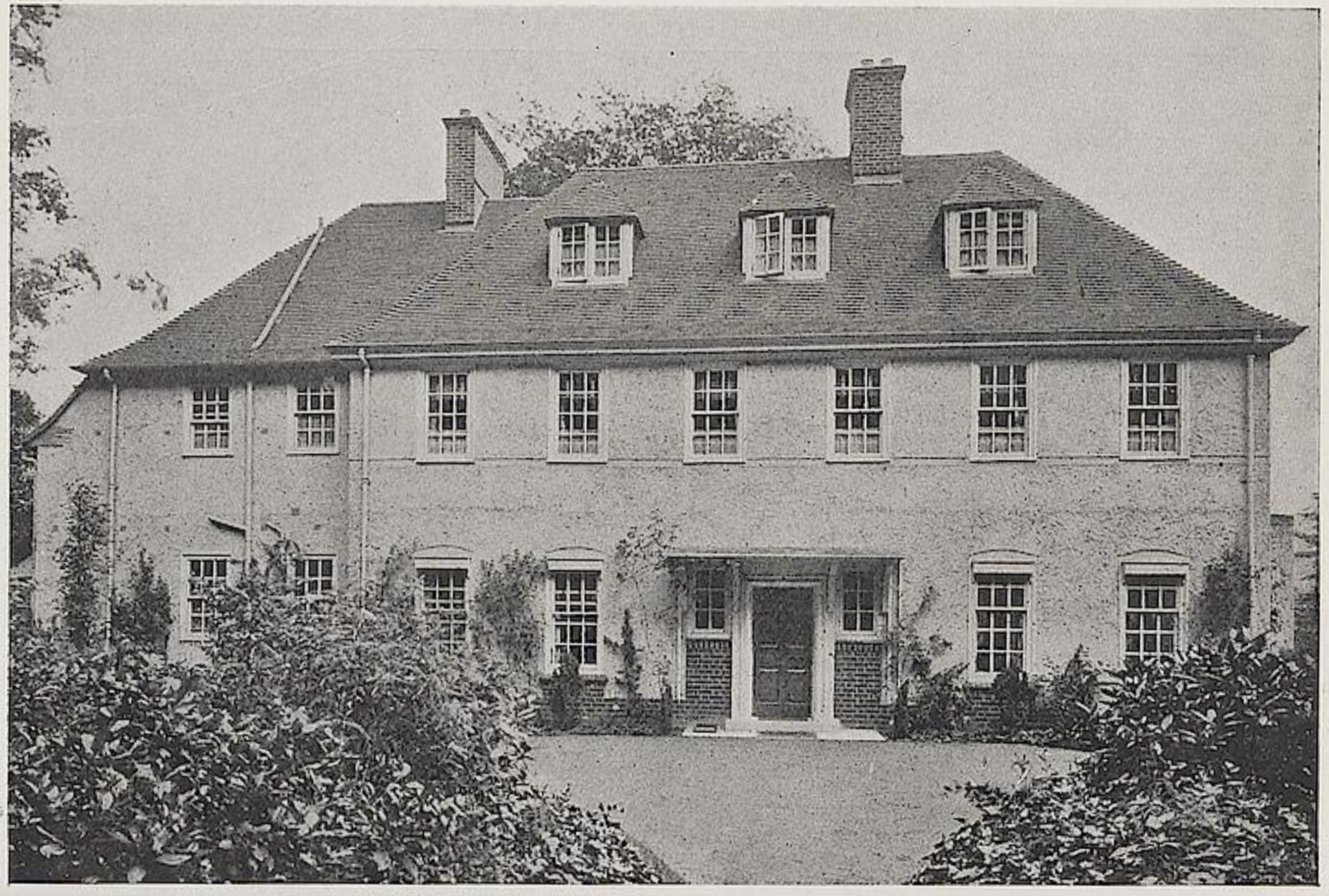
Alstonfield, Esher

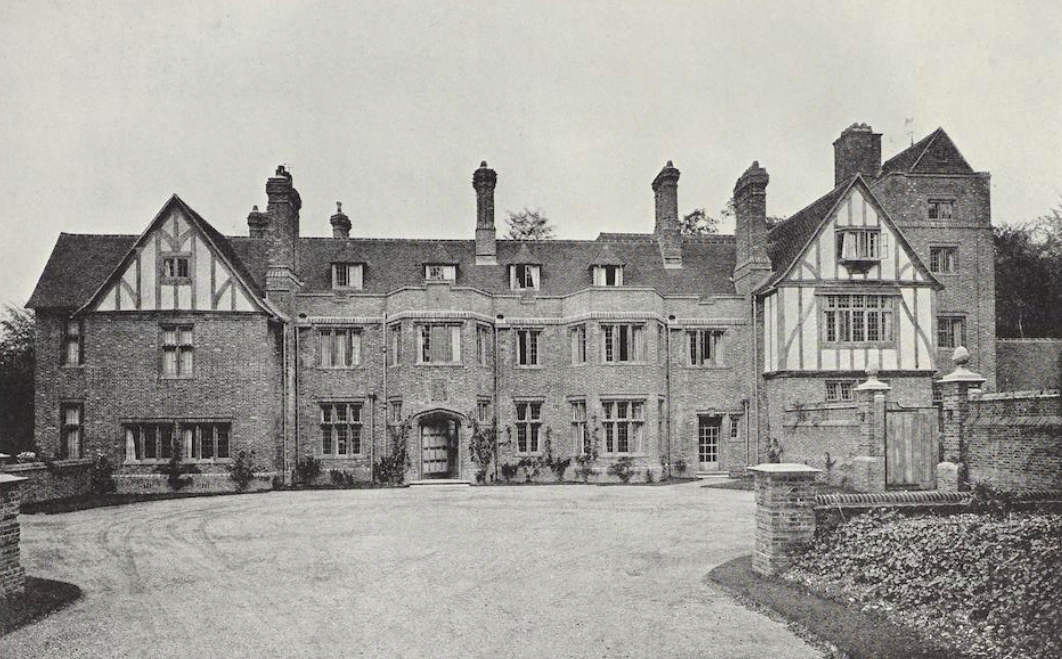
Huntercombe Place, Oxfordshire

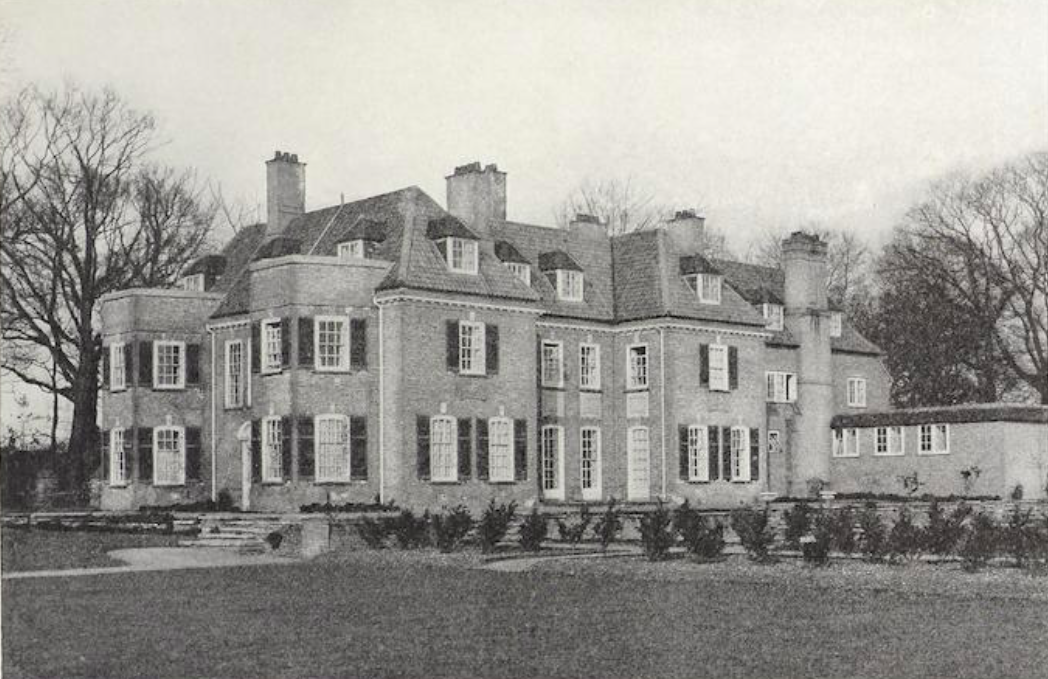
Sprowston Court, Norwich

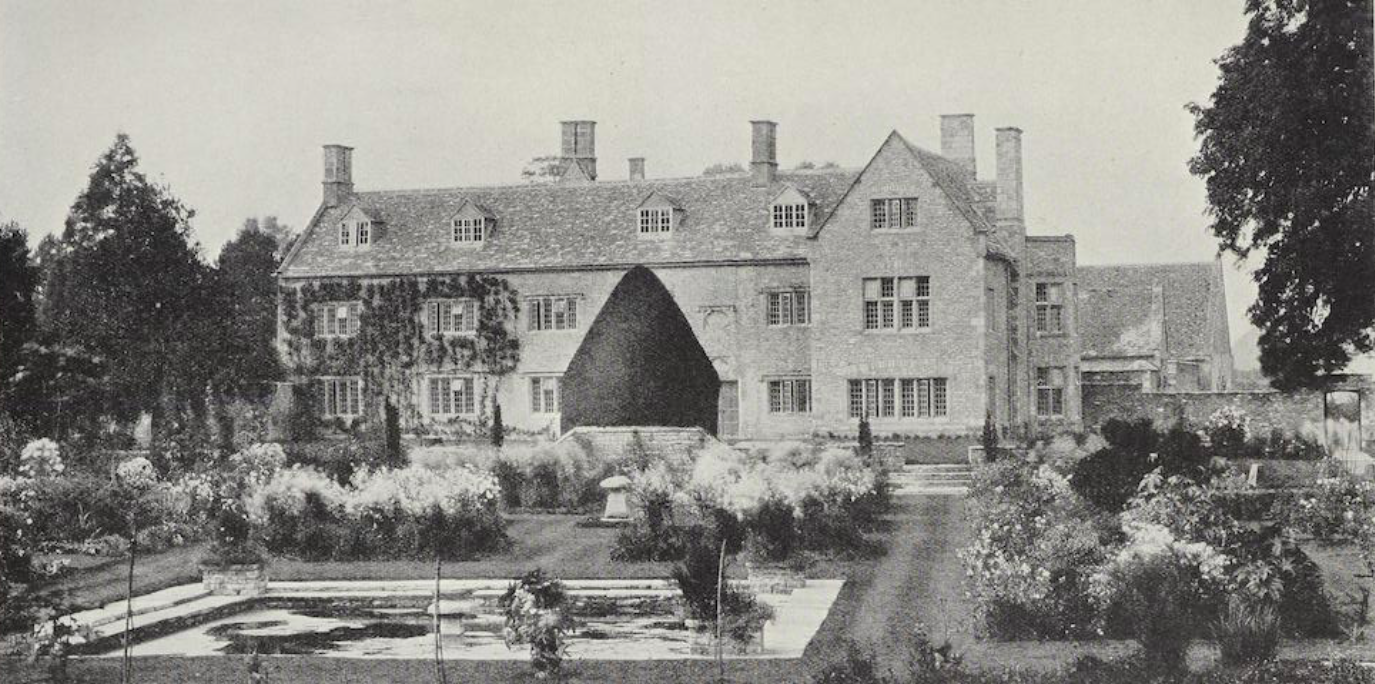
The Parsonage Farm, Shipton-under-Wychwood

Oswald Partridge Milne FRSA FRIBA (February 1881 – 15 January 1968) was a British architect.

== Biography ==
Born in Balham, London, in February 1881, Milne was the son of the architect William Oswald Milne (1847-1927), who was a partner with Thomas E Champion and Edward Morgan Llewelyn Forster (father of the novelist) at 39 Great Marlborough Street, Middlesex FRIBA. His family subsequently moved to Enfield, Middlesex.

Educated at Bedford School, Milne began his architectural training in 1898 when he was articled to Sir Arthur Blomfield. In 1902 he joined the office of Sir Edwin Lutyens. In 1904 he set up his own practice and in 1919 formed a partnership with Paul Phipps.

He was Vice-President of the Royal Society of Arts between 1959 and 1961.

During the First World War he served as a major in the Royal Army Service Corps and during the Second World War as a captain in the Home Guard.

He became a resident of Hampstead, north London, and between 1937 and 1953 served on Hampstead Borough Council as a councillor and alderman. He was Mayor of Hampstead between 1947 and 1949.

He died on 15 January 1968, aged 86.

== Works ==
Amongst Milne's commissions in London were the interior of Claridge's Hotel and the Eleventh Church of Christ Scientist, Baker Street. He was responsible for buildings at Bedford School, Blundell's School, Cheltenham College, Christ's Hospital, Dame Alice Harpur School and Highgate School.

Milne and Phipps designed the County of Pembroke War Memorial in Haverfordwest, erected in 1921.

He was the architect of Coleton Fishacre, which was built in 1925–1926.
