= Lulu Gribbin =

American shark attack survivor and advocate (born 2008)

Lulu Ann Gribbin
- Born: October 3, 2008 (age 18); Colorado
- Education: Mountain Brook High School, Mountain Brook, Alabama
- Known for: Surviving a shark attack and advocating for amputees
- Website: https://www.lulustrong.com

Lulu Gribbin (born October 3, 2008) is a para-athlete and youth advocate who founded the Lulu Strong Foundation in 2025, a program to assist amputees. She survived a shark attack in 2024 which led to the loss of her left hand and almost her entire right leg. She has also advocated for a bill that would allow emergency alerts following a shark attack.

== Shark attack ==
Lulu Gribbin was attacked by a bull shark on June 7, 2024 at Seacrest Beach while on vacation in Florida. According to Gribbin's account, she lost her left hand first, then part of her right leg, but another portion of it also had to be amputated. She spent 77 days in the Ascension Sacred Heart Hospital Emerald Coast for her recovery.

== Activism ==
=== Lulu's Law ===
Lulu's Law was introduced in Alabama on July 8, 2024, then the United States House of Representatives on August 16 of that same year. That law would require Wireless Emergency Alerts to be issued in the event of a shark attack. Gribbin's attack followed the attack of another woman 90 minutes prior, and a few miles away. The bill would have originally allowed for an emergency alert to be issued if there was an "imminent danger" caused by sharks. It was updated to allow for alerts only if there had been an unprovoked attack, after community members worried that it might lead to excessive alerts. It was signed into law by the president on June 26, 2026.

=== Lulu Strong Foundation (2025–present) ===
Lulu Strong Foundation logo

She created the Lulu Strong Foundation to support to help amputees receive lighter-weight prosthetics faster. She stated, "I would love to have kids be able to experience what I've experienced and have just an amazing life an amputee". Gribbin states that the mission of the foundation is to fund research in prosthetics.

The board of her project consists of her mom, Ann Blair Gribbin, who helped co-found, Davis Butler, a shareholder in Baker Donelson's Atlanta office, who specializes in mergers and acquisitions, corporate governance, and strategic advisory work. Stephen Faust, CEO of Dash Solutions, and a financial technology specialist, also helped co-found the project. David Jones, a forearm amputee, is also part of the board.

The organization issued its first grant to help amputees recover from phantom limb pain with virtual reality therapy, specifically targeted brain rehabilitation and the newest prosthetics by donating $100,000 USD to Axolo Health. The upper limb device is registered as a Class II software medical device by the FDA. The lower limb device is yet to be certified. She used it in her recovery.

== Sports ==
=== Golf ===
Gribbin started playing golf three months after she was attacked. She started swinging with her remaining hand, until she started to use a custom-made golf prosthesis attachment made from PVC. She took the design and put it through a 3D printer.

She walked the thirteenth hole with Justin Thomas at a Waste Management Phoenix Open practice round, sinking in a birdie putt. She also played the sixteenth hole with Rickie Fowler.

=== Other sports ===
Aside from golf, she does water skiing or running on the side.

== Awards ==
She was given the Southern Living Southerner of the Year award in 2025.
