= Llanwnda, Pembrokeshire =

Village and parish in Pembrokeshire, Wales

Coordinates: 52.0134°N 5.0147°W

Llanwnda
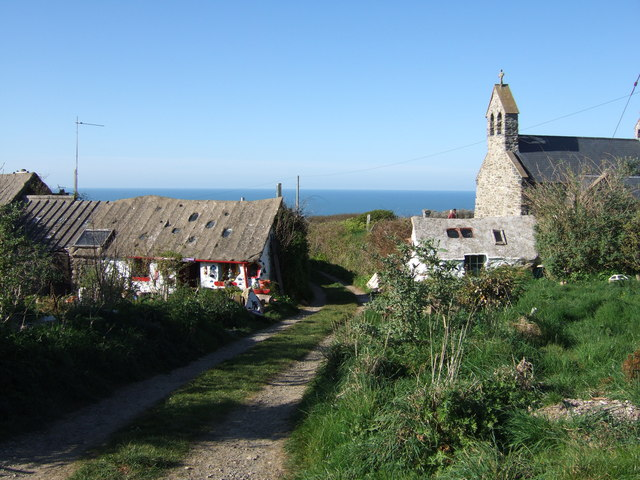
- Llanwnda

- Location within Pembrokeshire
- OS grid reference: SM932395
- Community: Pencaer
- Principal area: Pembrokeshire
- Preserved county: Dyfed
- Country: Wales
- Sovereign state: United Kingdom
- Post town: GOODWICK
- Postcode district: SA64
- Dialling code: 01348
- Police: Dyfed-Powys
- Fire: Mid and West Wales
- Ambulance: Welsh
- UK Parliament: Preseli Pembrokeshire
- Senedd Cymru – Welsh Parliament: Preseli Pembrokeshire

Llanwnda is a rural village and parish to the north of the Welsh county of Pembrokeshire and part of the community of Pencaer. It lies some two miles northwest of the port of Fishguard and is inside the boundaries of the Pembrokeshire Coast National Park.

== History ==
Ancient and ritualistic remains are scattered about the area of the parish, indicating occupation from prehistoric times.

The hamlet of Trefasser, according to topographer Samuel Lewis, was stated to be the birthplace of Asser, the biographer of the 9th-century king of Wessex, Alfred the Great. In about 1076, forces of north and south Wales met in battle, with the north Welsh victorious. Lewis also noted that the historian Gerald of Wales was incumbent in the parish for a time in the 12th century.

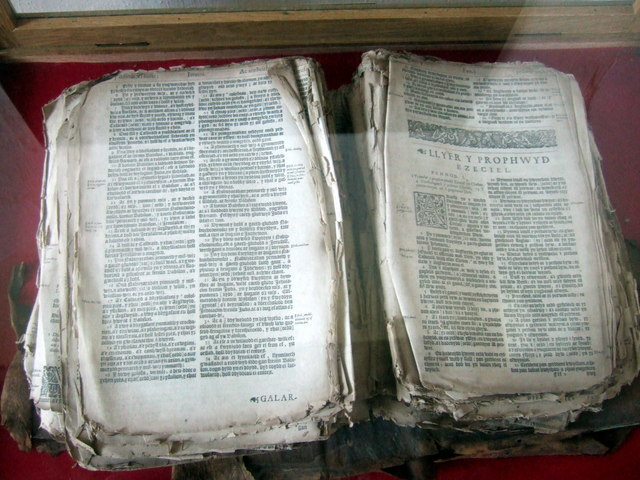
1620 Welsh Bible

To the north of the village is the rocky outcrop of Garnwnda, which was the site of a French soldiers' camp during the Battle of Fishguard in 1797. A tattered Welsh Bible of 1620, in Llanwnda church, is said to have been rescued from the hands of the French invaders.

On the north side of Garnwnda is a prominent cromlech excavated by John Fenton in 1847.

== Parish ==
The coastal parish of Llanwnda (as Llanunda) appears on a 1578 parish map of Pembrokeshire. Included in the parish are numerous small settlements and the town of Goodwick as well as the village of Llanwnda. The most northerly point is Strumble Head.

Lewis, in his 1833 Topographical Dictionary of Wales, noted the population of the parish as 1,046.

The parish church of St Gwyndaf, situated in a walled churchyard, has mediaeval origins and was extensively restored in the 19th century. It is a Grade II* listed building.

== Governance ==
Llanwnda is the name of a community electoral ward to Pencaer Community Council, electing 3 of the 6 members of the council.

== In popular culture ==
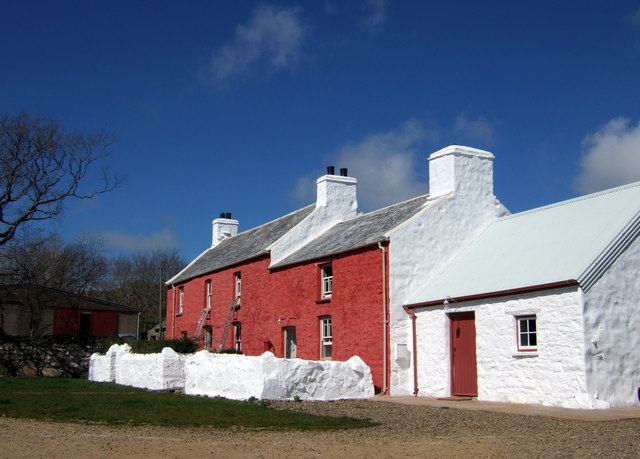
Trehilyn farmhouse

Llanwnda came to a degree of national prominence in the summer of 2007 following the purchase of a semi-derelict farmhouse (Trehilyn) by the broadcaster Griff Rhys Jones and the ensuing BBC television documentary, A Pembrokeshire Farm, which recorded its restoration. A second series followed, and both series were repeated in 2023.
