= Strumble Head =

Headland in Pembrokeshire, Wales

Coordinates: 52.029°N 5.074°W

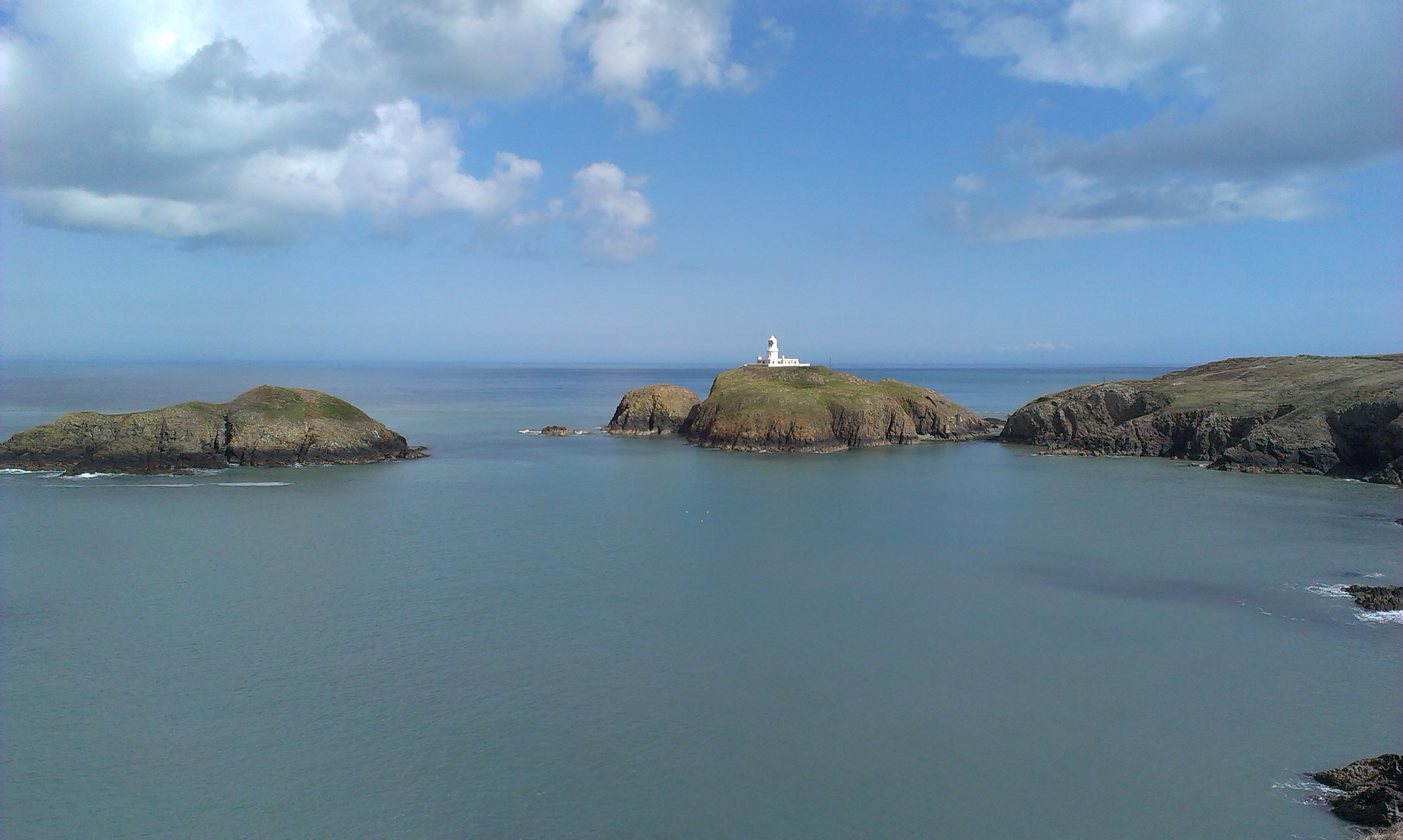
View across Carreg Onnen Bay with Ynys Onnen to the left of the lighthouse

Map of Strumble Head, at north-west corner of the Pen Caer Peninsula. Three offshore islands are Ynys Meicel, Ynys Onnen and Carreg Onnen

Strumble Head (Welsh: Pen Caer, Trwyn-câr, Pen Strwmbl) is a rocky headland in the community of Pencaer in Pembrokeshire, Wales, within the Pembrokeshire Coast National Park. It marks the southern limit of Cardigan Bay. Three islands lie off the head: Ynys Meicel – 112 feet (34 m) – Ynys Onnen and Carreg Onnen.

== Headland ==
Strumble Head, which is on the Pembrokeshire Coast Path, comprises part of the Strumble Head - Llechdafad Cliffs Site of Special Scientific Interest and is one of the best sites in Britain to view cetaceans, particularly the porpoise which can be spotted in the tidal races around the headland with modest binoculars. Public cetacean watches are frequently organized by the Goodwick-based local marine wildlife conservationist Sea Trust. Seals can often be spotted. A wartime experimental microwave transmitter site was converted as a shelter for wildlife fans and was opened by Bill Oddie in 1988. As well as marine mammals, the headland is a particularly good place to observe the passage of migrating birds, especially during the period from the end of July through to November.

The adjacent coast has been the site of numerous shipwrecks. In 2003, a French shipwreck, possibly from the battle of Fishguard, was found nearby. The Bardse of the Pile of Fowdrey was wrecked off Strumble Head on 3 October 1763 laden with a cargo of iron and copper from Wicklow bound for Chepstow. In 1915, the barque Calburga, one of Canada's last square rigged sailing ships, was lost. The crew were able to get to safety on their lifeboat, leaving a dispersed area of wreckage, which remains off the coast 1 mile (1500 metres) south-west of the lighthouse.

The headland gives its name to Strumble Head Lighthouse on the island of Ynys Meicel, and Strumble VOR, a way-point in many transatlantic flights.
