= Melin Tregwynt =

Grade II listed building in Pembrokeshire, Wales

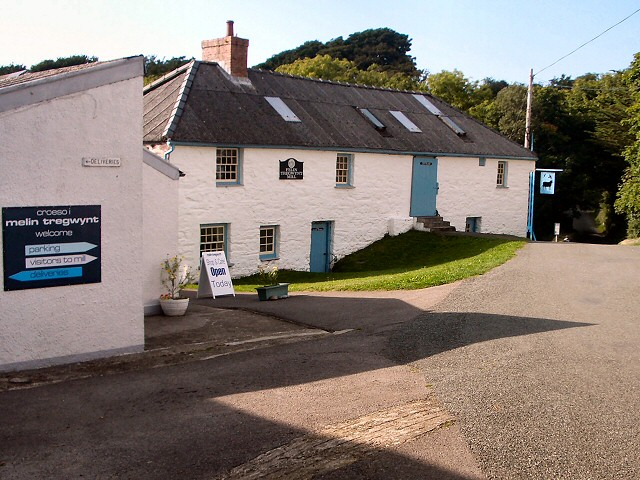
- Mill in September 2005

- Location within Pembrokeshire
- Built: 17th century
- Location: Tregwynt, Granston parish, Pencaer, Pembrokeshire, Wales
- Coordinates: 51°58′19″N 5°04′03″W
- Industry: Woollen industry in Wales
- Products: Woven wool
- Employees: c. 30

Melin Tregwynt (Tregwynt Mill) is a woollen mill in the hamlet of Tregwynt in the parish of Granston, Pembrokeshire, Wales. A mill has stood on this site since 1819 taking fleeces from the sheep farms of the area, carding and spinning them into woollen yarn and then weaving the yarn into cloth and blankets. Today, the mill makes a line of upmarket blankets, cushions, clothing, and accessories.

== History ==
Tregwynt woollen mill (Melin Tregwynt) lies in an isolated valley on the coast of Pembrokeshire. It is about 0.75 miles (1.21 km) from the Pembrokeshire Coast Path. The hipped and whitewashed rubble stone building has the date of July 1819 on a roof truss. It was originally a corn mill, and was converted to a woollen mill later in the 19th century. The mill was part of the Tregwynt estate. On the 1841 tithe map, it was called Dyffryn Bach, owned by G. J. Harries and occupied by David Evans.

The local farmers would sell their fleeces to the mill, which would wash, card, comb, and spin the wool into yarn and then weave it into blankets. The mill was powered by water from the local stream. In an unusual design, the water wheel is inside the building. The large iron overshot wheel probably dates to the later part of the 19th century. The water wheel drove hammers that beat the woven cloth to clean and soften it. Later the water wheel drove leather belts that powered the carding engines and looms. This equipment has been preserved in the old section of the mill.

The present owner's grandfather bought the mill for £760 in May 1912 and operated it with his son. During World War II the mill devoted most of its capacity to making knitting wool, which was not rationed. In the 1950s the owners opened a shop at the mill and in St Davids and Fishguard, and started to develop Melin Tregwynt as a brand. The business thrived in the 1960s and 1970s and survived the recession in the 1980s that forced many other Welsh mills to close. The founder's grandson entered the business and started to develop foreign markets.

== Recent years ==
As of 1997 the mill was weaving 2 miles (3.2 km) of cloth each month. Melin Tregwynt now outsources some processes, including carding and spinning. The mill's water wheel still functions but is no longer used to power the machinery. The 2008 Guinness Book of Records noted that the mill had woven the world's largest picnic blanket for Waitrose. In 2012, the mill celebrated 100 years as a family business, now weaving for a global market. The looms are still manually warped, the knots are tied by hand and the blankets are finished by hand. Melin Tregwynt operates a cafe at the mill as well as the shop.

In September 2012, Melin Tregwynt was featured at Heal's in London during the London Design Festival. In 2012 the Welsh fashion designer Jayne Pierson created a line of bespoke women's wear for Melin Tregwynt. The mill featured in a BBC Two Wales Made in Wales episode in December 2012. The mill's products have been featured on various TV shows including Big Brother and Doctor Who. In 2013, the mill exhibited at the Milan Furniture Fair. In 2015, a design by Melin Tregwynt was used as the pattern for a dance choreographed by Angharad Harrop to be performed in the National Theatre Wales and Theatr Genedlaethol Cymru.

As of 2016, the mill employed about 30 people. It is a Grade II listed building.

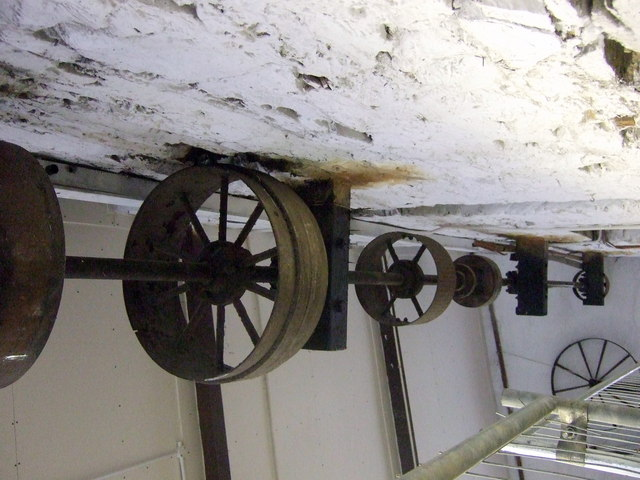
Gear shaft

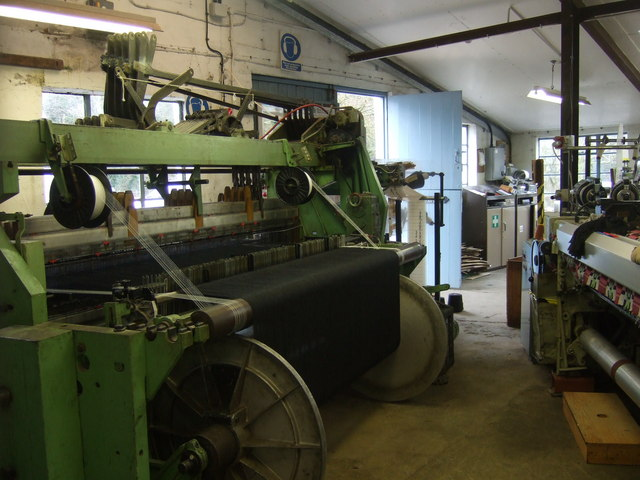
Loom

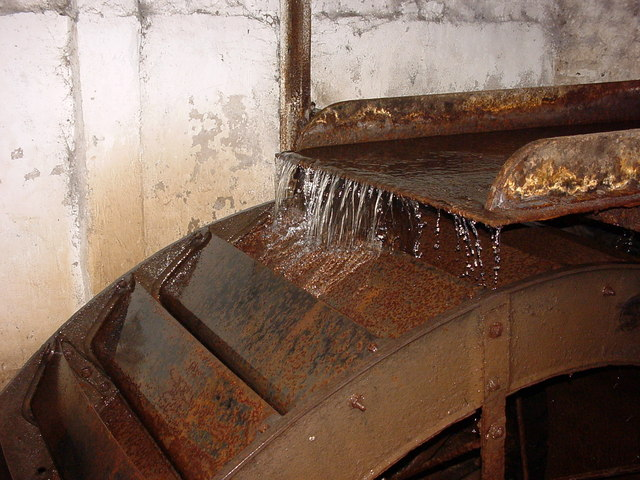
Water wheel

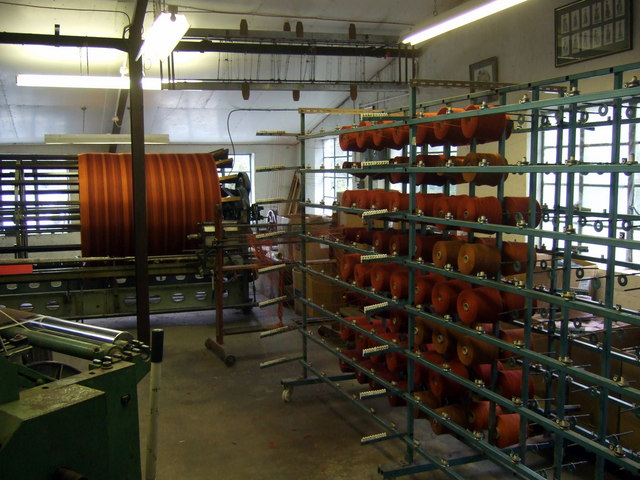
Racks of wool

== Sources ==
- a little about us…, Melin Tregwynt, archived from the original on 2015-04-19
- Country Life, Country Life, Limited, 1997
- Dragicevich, Peter; O'Carroll, Etain; Smith, Helena (2013-11-01), "Melin Tregwynt", Lonely Planet Wales, Lonely Planet Publications, ISBN 978-1-74321-816-7
- Katie (Sheepskin), A visit to Melin Tregwynt, Welsh blanket makers
- Kelsall, Dennis; Kelsall, Jan (2016-03-21), The Pembrokeshire Coast Path, Cicerone Press Limited, ISBN 978-1-78362-326-6
- Lloyd, Thomas; Orbach, Julian; Scourfield, Robert (2004), Pembrokeshire, Yale University Press, ISBN 978-0-300-10178-2
- McCrum, Kirstie (22 September 2012), "100 years of Welsh weavers Melin Tregwynt", Wales online, Media Wales
- "Melin Tregwynt", Made in Wales, BBC, 6 December 2012
- Melin Tregwynt, Rume
- "Melin Tregwynt", Visit Pembrokeshire
- Melin Tregwynt, Welsh Mills Society – Cymdeithas Melinau Cymru
- Misstear, Rachael (6 April 2013), "Woollen revival boosts Melin Tregwynt mill as it heads to Milan", Wales Online
- Nelson, Daniel (11 April 2013), "100 Years of Melin Tregwynt", ateliertally.com
- "Patagonia 150 inspires new design from Melin Tregwynt mill", Patagonia 150, 2015-08-06
- Rees, Claire (21 February 2012), "WM Wool Is Back; Designer Jayne Pierson, Pictured, Has Collaborated with Iconic Welsh Woollen Mill Melin Tregwynt and the Results Are a Fusion of Heritage, Nature and Cutting-Edge Fashion", Western Mail (Wales), Cardiff, Wales: MGN Ltd. – via TheFreeLibrary
- "Tregwynt Woollen Mill", Historic Wales
