= Tregwynt Hoard =

Hoard found in Wales

Coordinates: 51°58′11″N 5°4′25″W

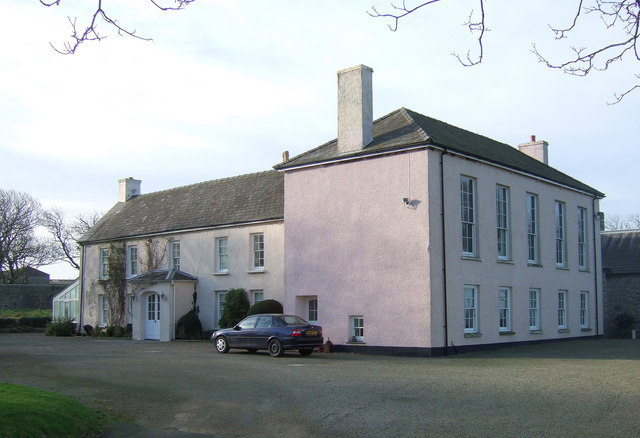
- The mansion where the hoard was found.
- Material: Gold, silver, pottery and lead.
- Created: est. 1648
- Period/culture: English Civil War
- Discovered: Tregwynt Mansion, Nr Fishguard, in 1996

The Tregwynt Hoard is a mid-17th-century hoard of coins found at Tregwynt Mansion near Fishguard in Pembrokeshire, Wales, in 1996. The hoard is now in National Museum Wales. The treasure consisted of 33 gold coins, 467 silver coins and a gold ring. This was the first English Civil War hoard found in Pembrokeshire.

== Local history ==
This mansion had been the scene where the invasion of the French was first reported to Colonel Thomas Knox who was at a dance there on 23 February 1797. Knox, who had been appointed by his father William Knox went into a strategic withdrawal to Haverfordwest which is inland. The retreat of the Fishguard Fencibles was halted by Lord Cawdor who persuaded Knox to advance. The Fencibles who were local volunteers saw off the force of 1200 French convicts. It was reported the local population assisted in seeing off the "last invasion of British soil". The BBC reported that there was a local story that the guests at the dance hid their valuables and that when a hoard was discovered it was thought initially to have confirmed the tale.

== The hoard ==
The hoard can be dated from the date of the last coin that was included in the hoard and this came from 1647 or 1648. This date is at the end of English Civil War and these troubles are the probable reason for the hoard being deposited. There are over 200 hoards that date from the time of the civil war. This was the first civil war hoard found in Pembrokeshire. These goods were hidden by an outbuilding of the Tregwynt Mansion. They were discovered in 1996 as a result of building work resulting from the construction of a tennis court. Because a few coins had been found, the ground was searched by a metal detector and Roy Lewis discovered many more coins. By the end, a JCB digger was involved and in addition to the coins they also found lead sheeting which is thought to have covered the hoard and a ring with a motto inside it. The inscription reads "Better death than false of faith" (spelling updated).

The hoard was probably hidden at the time that Oliver Cromwell came to Pembrokeshire to settle the local Royalists who were in rebellion. The value at the time was over 50 pounds and this would have been over four years' wages for an average soldier. The money may have been saved by Llewellin Harries who lived at the mansion at the time with his twelve children.

== Artefacts ==
The treasure consisted of 33 gold coins, 467 silver coins and a gold Posie ring. Amongst the coins were:

- The latest coin is a 1647 or 1648 shilling bearing a sceptre
- A Scottish 1602 coin of James VI of Scotland
- A Charles I of England one pound gold coin
- A Charles I silver half-crown struck at an emergency mint in Shrewsbury in 1642

== See also ==
- List of hoards in Britain
