= List of Roman-to-modern scheduled monuments in Pembrokeshire =

Pembrokeshire is the fifth-largest county in Wales, but has more scheduled monuments (526) than any other local authority area except Powys. This gives it an extremely high density of monuments, with 33.4 per 100km2. (Only the urban authority areas of Newport and Merthyr Tydfil have a higher density). With three-quarters of its boundary being coastline, Pembrokeshire occupies the western end of the West Wales peninsular, terminating with the tiny cathedral city of St David's. It is a historic county in its own right but between 1975 and 1996 it joined with Carmarthenshire and Cardiganshire to form Dyfed.

Over two-thirds of Pembrokeshire's scheduled monuments (346) date to pre-historic times. Even this is too many entries to conveniently show in one list, so the list is subdivided into three, with all the Roman to modern entries on this list, and subdividing the prehistoric sites along the lines of the former local districts of Preseli Pembrokeshire, (the northern half) and South Pembrokeshire. The two lists of prehistoric sites include hill forts, promontory forts on both coastal headlands and inland locations. They also include a variety of enclosures, hut sites and Raths, a wide range of burial sites and other ritual and religious sites listed as barrows and chambered tombs, stone circles and standing stones.

The county's 182 Roman, medieval and post-medieval sites include only three sites from Roman times, but from the Early Medieval period there are many inscribed stones, stone crosses, and holy wells. Also scheduled are many Medieval castles, mottes and baileys, priories, chapels and churches, houses, town walls and a Bishop's palace, along with a wide variety of post-medieval sites from coalmines, kilns and dovecotes through to 19th and 20th century coastal defenses.

Scheduled monuments have statutory protection. The compilation of the list is undertaken by Cadw Welsh Historic Monuments, which is an executive agency of the National Assembly of Wales. The list of scheduled monuments below is supplied by Cadw with additional material from RCAHMW and Dyfed Archaeological Trust.

== Roman to modern scheduled monuments in Pembrokeshire ==
The list is sorted by period, and then by Community so that sites of similar age and locality are placed near each other. Clicking on one of the heading arrows will sort the list by that information.

Image	Name	Site type	Community	Location	Details	Period	SAM No & Refs
	Castle Flemish	Farmstead or villa	Ambleston	51.904°N 4.8981°W, SN007267	A four-sided low bank encloses an area some 80m across. Excavated in 1922 by Mortimer Wheeler and now thought to have been a late first-century farmstead or villa. It is also known as Castell. Nineteenth century rumours of a 'golden table' being found here remain unsubstantiated. A public road, which is also the Ambelston/Puncheston boundary, runs through the middle.	Roman	PE058
	Roman Road 300m East of Bryn Farm	Roman Road	Llanddewi Velfrey	51.8326°N 4.6786°W, SN155182	Identified in the early 19th century, this 200 meter stretch of Roman road across boggy ground preserves good construction details and remains as a raised ager, 10 meters wide. Small test excavation in 1993 confirmed two phase construction. The line of the road has been traced a further 700m NE. Scheduled in 1996.	Roman	PE472
Gateholm Island	Hut Groups on Gateholm Island	Hut settlement	Marloes and St Brides	51.7192°N 5.23°W, SM769072	Tidal island with over 100 rectangular huts probably of Romano-British or early post-Roman date, possibly as a Christian monastic settlement. It was studied in 1910, 1930, 1971 and most recently in 2011 by a Timeteam investigation. None have established anything conclusive.	Roman	PE180
Stone lined graves at West Angle Bay	West Angle Bay Early Medieval Settlement	Cemetery	Angle	51.6848°N 5.109°W, SM851030	St Anthony's Chapel churchyard	Early Medieval	PE554
	Maen Colman	Cross-marked stone	Boncath	52.0138°N 4.6006°W, SN216382		Early Medieval	PE203
	Carew Cross	Cross	Carew	51.698°N 4.8278°W, SN047037	4 metres (13 ft) high, spectacular cross commemorating Maredudd ab Edwin, 11th century King of Deheubarth	Early Medieval	PE009
	Inscribed Pillar Stone in Bridell Churchyard	Inscribed stone	Cilgerran	52.0469°N 4.6604°W, SN176420		Early Medieval	PE143
	Inscribed Stone in Cilgerran churchyard	Inscribed stone	Cilgerran	52.0563°N 4.6404°W, SN190430		Early Medieval	PE144
	Inscribed Stone near Glan-Dwr Independent Chapel	Inscribed stone	Crymych	51.9263°N 4.6324°W, SN190285		Early Medieval	PE147
	Rhyd-y-Gath Pillar Cross	Cross-marked stone	Crymych	51.951°N 4.5988°W, SN215312		Early Medieval	PE233
Pillar stone, Llanychllwydog Church	Five Pillar-Crosses in Llanychllwydog Churchyard	Cross-marked stone	Cwm Gwaun	51.9723°N 4.8955°W, SN012343		Early Medieval	PE227
Llanllawer Holy Well and the issuing stream	Llanllawer Holy Well	Holy Well	Cwm Gwaun	51.986°N 4.9326°W, SM987360		Early Medieval	PE229
Pillar stone, Llanychaer churchyard	Pillar Cross in Llanychaer Churchyard	Cross	Cwm Gwaun	51.9731°N 4.9255°W, SM991345		Early Medieval	PE230
Gatepost Cross at Llanllawer Church	Two Pillar-Crosses in Llanllawer Churchyard	Cross-marked stone	Cwm Gwaun	51.9855°N 4.9331°W, SM986359		Early Medieval	PE228
Pontfaen church with pillar stones	Two Pillar-Crosses in Pontfaen Churchyard	Cross	Cwm Gwaun	51.9698°N 4.8812°W, SN021340		Early Medieval	PE226
	Inscribed Stone 130m E of Penwaun	Cross	Dinas Cross	51.9981°N 4.9382°W, SM983373		Early Medieval	PE485
	Pillar Stone in Penparke	Cross	Eglwyswrw	51.9839°N 4.7788°W, SN093354		Early Medieval	PE448
	Tre-Bwlch Pillar Crosses	Cross-marked stone	Eglwyswrw	51.9819°N 4.7882°W, SN086351		Early Medieval	PE234
	Inscribed Stone in outer face of wall of St Michael's Church (now in Llandissilio Church)	Cross-marked stone	Llandissilio West	51.8628°N 4.7329°W, SN119218		Early Medieval	CM068
	Mesur-y-Dorth Cross-Incised Stone	Cross-marked stone	Llanrhian	51.9323°N 5.1456°W, SM839307		Early Medieval	PE047
	Drim Camp	Ringwork	Llawhaden	51.8415°N 4.8114°W, SN064196		Early Medieval	PE107
	Inscribed Stones outside Ruined Church of St Teilo (now in Maenclochog Church).	Cross-marked stone	Maenclochog	51.9119°N 4.7883°W, SN083273		Early Medieval	PE146
	Martin's Haven Early Christian Inscribed Cross	Cross-marked stone	Marloes and St Brides	51.7351°N 5.2449°W, SM760090		Early Medieval	PE431
	Two Pre-Norman Gravestones in Mathry Churchyard	Cross-marked stone	Mathry	51.9459°N 5.0875°W, SM879319		Early Medieval	PE150
	Castell Pen-Gawsai	Earthwork (unclassified)	Mynachlog-Ddu	51.9188°N 4.7493°W, SN110280		Early Medieval	PE289
	Cilgwyn, Cross Inscribed Stone at Cilfair	Cross-marked stone	Nervern	51.9887°N 4.8019°W, SN077359		Early Medieval	PE560
	High Cross in Nevern Churchyard	Cross	Nevern	52.0254°N 4.7951°W, SN083400		Early Medieval	PE164
Vitalinus stone, Nevern	Inscribed Stone in Nevern Churchyard	Inscribed stone	Nevern	52.0254°N 4.7952°W, SN083400		Early Medieval	PE151
	Velindre Pillar-Cross	Cross-marked stone	New Moat	51.8967°N 4.8437°W, SN044258		Early Medieval	PE236
	Pillar Cross 140m SE of Newport Church	Cross-marked stone	Newport, Pembrokeshire	52.014°N 4.8302°W, SN059388		Early Medieval	PE305
	Pillar Cross in Newport Churchyard	Cross-marked stone	Newport, Pembrokeshire	52.0151°N 4.8318°W, SN058389		Early Medieval	PE304
	Incised Cross at Cemetery Cross Roads	Cross-marked stone	Pencaer	52.0127°N 5.0078°W, SM937392		Early Medieval	PE258
	Llanwnwr Cross-Slab	Cross-marked stone	Pencaer	52.0228°N 5.0692°W, SM895405		Early Medieval	PE072
	Tal-y-Gaer Corbelled Hut	Corbelled hut	Pencaer	52.0079°N 5.0709°W, SM893388		Early Medieval	PE210
Stone in Morvil churchyard	Two Early Christian Crosses in Morvil Churchyard	Cross	Puncheston	51.9402°N 4.8574°W, SN036307		Early Medieval	PE235
	Inscribed Stone at Llangwarran Farm	Inscribed stone	Scleddau	51.9428°N 5.0135°W, SM929314		Early Medieval	PE145
	St Justinian's Chapel	Chapel	St Davids and the Cathedral Close	51.8793°N 5.3087°W, SM723252		Early Medieval	PE014
	St Non's Chapel	Chapel	St Davids and the Cathedral Close	51.8722°N 5.2689°W, SM750243		Early Medieval	PE013
	St Patrick's Chapel	Chapel	St Davids and the Cathedral Close	51.8974°N 5.2955°W, SM734272		Early Medieval	PE012
St Govans' chapel	St Govan's Chapel and Well	Chapel	Stackpole and Castlemartin	51.5986°N 4.9367°W, SR967929		Early Medieval	PE321
	Hang Stone Davey Near Lamber Smithy	Cross-marked stone	The Havens	51.7909°N 5.0524°W, SM895146		Early Medieval	PE078
	Inscribed Stone in Churchyard	Inscribed stone	Wolfscastle	51.9133°N 4.9548°W, SM968279	Inscribed stone, known as the HOGTIVIS STONE or OGTENLO STONE, probably 5th or 6th century, with inscriptions in Latin and Ogam. It now stands in the churchyard of St Dogwell's Church, having been moved there in the early 20th century, from a farmhouse at Little Treffgarne, where it was discovered in 1875 in use as a gatepost.	Early Medieval	PE152
	Angle Castle (or Hall)	Building (Unclassified)	Angle	51.6838°N 5.0891°W, SM865028	Variously assigned as Almshouse, Nunnery and castle remains, it is a late medieval hall, now in ruins, south of Angle village street.	Medieval	PE069
	Angle Dovecot	Dovecote	Angle	51.6858°N 5.0885°W, SM866031		Medieval	PE067
	Remains of East Blockhouse N of Rat Island	Blockhouse	Angle	51.6821°N 5.1242°W, SM841027		Medieval	PE398
Pele Tower, Angle	Pele Tower, Angle	Tower	Angle	51.6851°N 5.0884°W, SM866030	Part of a medieval moated mansion, which was later used as a Rectory, alongside Castle Farm.	Medieval	PE068
	Pointz Castle Mound	Motte	Brawdy	51.8699°N 5.1531°W, SM830237		Medieval	PE272
	Camrose Mound & Bailey Castle	Motte & Bailey	Camrose	51.8394°N 5.0109°W, SM926199		Medieval	PE217
	Carew Bridge	Bridge	Carew	51.6991°N 4.8267°W, SN047038		Medieval	PE083
	Carew Castle	Motte & Bailey	Carew	51.6985°N 4.83°W, SN046037		Medieval	PE001
	Castell Pen-yr-Allt	Castle	Cilgerran	52.0461°N 4.6877°W, SN157420		Medieval	PE169
Cilgerran Castle	Cilgerran Castle	Castle	Cilgerran	52.0569°N 4.6342°W, SN194431		Medieval	PE002
	Cilgerran Castle Additional Area	Castle	Cilgerran	52.0566°N 4.6346°W, SN195430		Medieval	PE384
	Castell Crychydd	Motte & Bailey	Clydey	51.9841°N 4.5332°W, SN261347		Medieval	PE205
	Castell Dyffrynmawr	Motte	Crymych	51.985°N 4.6593°W, SN175352		Medieval	PE208
	Castle Mound, Llanfyrnach	Motte	Crymych	51.951°N 4.5921°W, SN219312		Medieval	PE097
	Chapel and Burial Ground near Tre-Henry	Chapel	Crymych	51.9429°N 4.6006°W, SN213303		Medieval	PE098
Motte and bailey castle, Eglwyswrw	Castell Eglwyswrw	Motte & Bailey	Eglwyswrw	52.0127°N 4.7132°W, SN139383		Medieval	PE171
	Castell Llain-Fawr	Motte	Eglwyswrw	52.0039°N 4.6954°W, SN150373		Medieval	PE209
	Court Moated Site	Moated Site	Eglwyswrw	52.0218°N 4.7189°W, SN135394		Medieval	PE303
The castle from Hill Lane	Haverfordwest Castle	Castle	Haverfordwest	51.8028°N 4.9698°W, SM953157		Medieval	PE366
Monastic garden at Haverfordwest priory	Haverfordwest Priory	Priory	Haverfordwest	51.7976°N 4.9643°W, SM956151		Medieval	PE017
The Crypt at the bottom of Market Street	Medieval Crypt, Haverfordwest	House (domestic)	Haverfordwest	51.8011°N 4.9713°W, SM952155	Medieval Crypt at the corner of Market Street and High Street	Medieval	PE079
Motte at Cas-lai-Hayscastle	Hayscastle Motte	Motte	Hayscastle	51.8899°N 5.0599°W, SM895257		Medieval	PE221
	Eastington Manor House	Manor	Hundleton	51.6822°N 5.038°W, SM901025		Medieval	PE263
	Castell	Ringwork	Lampeter Velfrey	51.7996°N 4.6772°W, SN154146		Medieval	PE177
	Llangwathan Castle Mound	Motte	Lampeter Velfrey	51.8051°N 4.7078°W, SN134153		Medieval	PE434
	Hodgeston Moated Site	Moated Site	Lamphey	51.6592°N 4.8509°W, SS029995		Medieval	PE246
Part of Lamphey Bishop's Palace	Lamphey Bishop's Palace	Palace	Lamphey	51.672°N 4.8668°W, SN018009		Medieval	PE003
	Pengawse Medieval House Site	Manor	Llanddewi Velfrey	51.8207°N 4.6471°W, SN176168		Medieval	PE389
	Dingstopple Castle Mound	Motte	Llawhaden	51.8321°N 4.8156°W, SN060185		Medieval	PE183
Llawhaden Bridge	Llawhaden Bridge	Bridge	Llawhaden	51.8207°N 4.7951°W, SN074173		Medieval	PE023
The hall range and the well, Llawhaden Castle	Llawhaden Castle	Castle	Llawhaden	51.8223°N 4.7976°W, SN073175		Medieval	PE024
	Llawhaden Hospital	Hospital	Llawhaden	51.8207°N 4.8063°W, SN067173		Medieval	PE162
	St Teilo's Church & Churchyard	Church	Maenclochog	51.9083°N 4.7644°W, SN099269		Medieval	PE165
Manorbier Castle	Manorbier Castle	Castle	Manorbier	51.6457°N 4.7993°W, SS064978		Medieval	PE004
	Manorbier Dovecot	Dovecote	Manorbier	51.646°N 4.8016°W, SS062978		Medieval	PE459
	The Old Palace, Lydstep	Palace	Manorbier	51.6515°N 4.7677°W, SS086983		Medieval	PE403
	Castell Coch	House (domestic)	Martletwy	51.7884°N 4.7979°W, SN072136		Medieval	PE053
Cresswell Castle	Cresswell Castle	House (domestic)	Martletwy	51.7281°N 4.826°W, SN049070		Medieval	PE396
	Minwear Ringwork	Ringwork	Martletwy	51.7863°N 4.8116°W, SN062135		Medieval	PE433
The Sisters' House at Minwear	Sister's House	Building (Unclassified)	Martletwy	51.786°N 4.854°W, SN032135		Medieval	PE302
Pill priory chancel	Pill Priory	Priory	Milford Haven	51.7246°N 5.0382°W, SM902075	Late 12th century priory of the Tironensian Order. Daughter church of St Dogmaels Abbey.	Medieval	PE070
	Clyn Pattel Motte & Bailey	Motte	Narberth, Pembrokeshire	51.7949°N 4.7156°W, SN128142		Medieval	PE412
Narberth Castle ruins	Narberth Castle	Castle	Narberth, Pembrokeshire	51.7962°N 4.7424°W, SN109143		Medieval	PE040
	Castell Nanhyfer	Motte & Bailey	Nevern	52.0267°N 4.7969°W, SN082401		Medieval	PE160
Pilgrims' cross, Nevern	Rock Hewn Cross 220m West of Nevern Church	Cross	Nevern	52.0252°N 4.7986°W, SN081400		Medieval	PE161
	Castell-y-Fran	Motte	New Moat	51.8651°N 4.789°W, SN088222		Medieval	PE185
	New Moat Castle Mound	Motte & Bailey	New Moat	51.8929°N 4.8158°W, SN063253		Medieval	PE241
	Medieval Pottery Kiln, Newport Memorial Hall	Pottery kiln	Newport, Pembrokeshire	52.0158°N 4.8377°W, SN053390		Medieval	PE437
Castell Trefdraeth - Newport Castle from the churchyard	Newport Castle (Unoccupied parts)	Castle	Newport, Pembrokeshire	52.0141°N 4.8327°W, SN057388		Medieval	PE087
	The Old Castle, Newport	Ringwork	Newport, Pembrokeshire	52.02°N 4.8309°W, SN058395		Medieval	PE404
Martello Tower (disused)	Paterchurch Tower, Pembroke Dock	Tower	Pembroke Dock	51.6935°N 4.9565°W, SM957035		Medieval	PE380
	Medieval Building at Kingston Farm	Building (Unclassified)	Pembroke	51.6582°N 4.9007°W, SR994995		Medieval	PE401
	Monkton Priory Dovecot	Dovecote	Pembroke	51.678°N 4.9282°W, SM976017		Medieval	PE415
Pembroke castle from the tidal millpond	Pembroke Castle	Castle	Pembroke	51.6769°N 4.9205°W, SM981016		Medieval	PE005
	Pembroke town walls	Town wall	Pembroke	51.6753°N 4.9088°W, SM989014		Medieval	PE015
	Carswell Medieval House	House (domestic)	Penally	51.676°N 4.7523°W, SN098010		Medieval	PE373
	Sculptured Stone Cross in Penally Church	Cross	Penally	51.6597°N 4.7228°W, SS117992		Medieval	PE142
The watchtower, Caldey Island	The Watchtower, Penally	Beacon	Penally	51.6674°N 4.7163°W, SN122000		Medieval	PE439
	West Tarr Vaulted Hall House	House (domestic)	Penally	51.6734°N 4.765°W, SN089008		Medieval	PE423
	Whitewell Medieval house	House (domestic)	Penally	51.6578°N 4.7558°W, SS096990		Medieval	PE137
	Castell Hendre	Motte	Puncheston	51.9122°N 4.8445°W, SN044275		Medieval	PE240
	Castell Mael	Ringwork	Puncheston	51.9306°N 4.8963°W, SN009297		Medieval	PE232
Motte at Castlebythe	Castell Mound, Castlebythe	Motte	Puncheston	51.9242°N 4.8788°W, SN021290		Medieval	PE238
	Deserted Medieval Site at New Inn	Deserted Rural Settlement	Puncheston	51.9378°N 4.8276°W, SN057303		Medieval	PE402
Trackway alongside the motte	Rudbaxton Motte	Motte	Rudbaxton	51.846°N 4.9618°W, SM961205		Medieval	PE432
Tidal Island, Slebech	Mounds on the Island, Slebech	Mound	Slebech	51.7903°N 4.8528°W, SN033140		Medieval	PE276
Picton Motte, Dungledi	Picton Castle Mound	Motte	Slebech	51.7851°N 4.8775°W, SN016135	Castle mound in the grounds of Picton Castle. Also known as the Belvedere or Dungledi	Medieval	PE277
St John's, Slebech	Slebech Old Church	Church	Slebech	51.7893°N 4.8547°W, SN032139	Ruined Church of St John, between Slebech Hall and the estuary shore	Medieval	PE275
	Remains of Medieval Farmhouse with Round Chimney at Croftufty	Farmstead	Solva	51.8817°N 5.2153°W, SM788252		Medieval	PE395
	Parc y Castell Mound and Bailey Castle	Castle	St Davids and the Cathedral Close	51.8796°N 5.2785°W, SM745252		Medieval	PE108
StDavids Bishop's Palace facade	St Davids Bishop's Palace	Palace	St Davids and the Cathedral Close	51.8821°N 5.2708°W, SM750254		Medieval	PE006
	St Davids Cathedral Close: Archdeacon of Cardigans Ground	House (domestic)	St Davids and the Cathedral Close	51.883°N 5.2684°W, SM751255		Medieval	PE443
	St Davids Cathedral Close: Chanter's Orchard	House (domestic)	St Davids and the Cathedral Close	51.8814°N 5.2701°W, SM750255		Medieval	PE440
	St Davids Cathedral Close: Cloister Hall (Undercroft only)	Undercroft	St Davids and the Cathedral Close	51.8825°N 5.2682°W, SM751254		Medieval	PE445
Medieval West Wall of the Cathedral Close	St Davids Cathedral Close: Close Wall and Sites of Former Gateways	Wall	St Davids and the Cathedral Close	51.8831°N 5.2705°W, SM750255		Medieval	PE018
	St Davids Cathedral Close: The Free School	School	St Davids and the Cathedral Close	51.8818°N 5.2693°W, SM750254		Medieval	PE442
	St Davids Cathedral Close: Vicar's College	Religious house	St Davids and the Cathedral Close	51.8826°N 5.2674°W, SM752255		Medieval	PE441
	St Davids Cathedral Mill Leat	Leat	St Davids and the Cathedral Close	51.8803°N 5.2758°W, SM746242		Medieval	PE457
TheCity Cross in Cross Square, St Davids	The City Cross	Cross	St Davids and the Cathedral Close	51.8811°N 5.2656°W, SM753253		Medieval	PE094
	Whitewell	Hospital	St Davids and the Cathedral Close	51.8792°N 5.269°W, SM751251		Medieval	PE482
St Dogmaels Abbey Remains	St Dogmaels Abbey and Coach House	Abbey	St Dogmaels	52.0806°N 4.6806°W, SN164458		Medieval	PE073
Motte north of St Ishmaels	St Ishmael's Castle Mound	Motte	St Ishmael's	51.7254°N 5.1361°W, SM835076		Medieval	PE196
	Scotsborough House Ruins	Country House	St Mary Out Liberty	51.6769°N 4.7245°W, SN117010		Medieval	PE547
	Flimston Farmhouse	Farmstead	Stackpole and Castlemartin	51.6213°N 5°W, SR924956		Medieval	PE447
	Linney Deserted Medieval Village	Deserted Medieval Village	Stackpole and Castlemartin	51.6297°N 5.0422°W, SR895967		Medieval	PE469
	Pricaston Farmhouse	Farmstead	Stackpole and Castlemartin	51.6285°N 5.01°W, SR917964		Medieval	PE451
	Sentence Castle Mound	Motte	Templeton	51.7715°N 4.7398°W, SN110116		Medieval	PE110
Castle Hill, Tenby	Tenby Castle	Castle	Tenby	51.6726°N 4.6947°W, SN137005		Medieval	PE163
Tenby Market Cross	Tenby Market Cross	Market cross	Tenby	51.677°N 4.7046°W, SN131010		Medieval	PE420
Town Walls and The Imperial Hotel, Tenby	Tenby town walls	Town wall	Tenby	51.6711°N 4.7006°W, SN133004		Medieval	PE007
	Higgons Well	Holy Well	Uzmaston and Boulston	51.797°N 4.9575°W, SM961151		Medieval	PE430
	House Platforms N of St. Mary's Churchyard	House platform	Wiston	51.8257°N 4.8715°W, SN022180		Medieval	PE461
	Moat NW of Merryborough Farm	Moated Site	Wiston	51.8165°N 4.9097°W, SM995170		Medieval	PE465
Wiston Castle	Wiston Castle	Motte & Bailey	Wiston	51.8268°N 4.8711°W, SN022181		Medieval	PE077
Wolfscastle motte	Wolfscastle Castle Mound	Motte & Bailey	Wolfscastle	51.8996°N 4.9698°W, SM957265		Medieval	PE254
	Corn Drying Kiln 130m E of Mirianog-Ganol	Corn-drying kiln	Eglwyswrw	51.9769°N 4.7109°W, SN139344		Post-Medieval/Modern	PE466
	Tafarn-y-bwlch Deserted Rural Settlement	Rectangular hut	Eglwyswrw	51.9696°N 4.7972°W, SN079338		Post-Medieval/Modern	PE490
	Underhill Wood Primitive Coal Workings	Coal mine	Jeffreyston	51.7269°N 4.7674°W, SN089067		Post-Medieval/Modern	PE463
Grove Colliery, Stepaside	Grove Colliery	Engine house	Kilgetty/Begelly	51.7319°N 4.6961°W, SN139071		Post-Medieval/Modern	PE489
Kilgetty Ironworks	Stepaside/Kilgetty Ironworks	Limekiln	Kilgetty/Begelly	51.7345°N 4.694°W, SN140074		Post-Medieval/Modern	PE418
Old wreck at Hook Colliery Quay	Hook Quay	Quay	Llangwm	51.767°N 4.9337°W, SM976116		Post-Medieval/Modern	PE529
Water mill at Aber Draw	Aberfelin Mill	Mill	Llanrhian	51.9482°N 5.1528°W, SM834324		Post-Medieval/Modern	PE376
	Moated Site 100m East of Caeforiog Bridge	Moated Site	Llanrhian	51.8976°N 5.1836°W, SM810269		Post-Medieval/Modern	PE449
Porthgain Harbour	Porthgain Quarry and Harbour	Industrial building	Llanrhian	51.9483°N 5.183°W, SM813325		Post-Medieval/Modern	PE382
	Castle Malgwyn Bridge	Bridge	Manordeifi	52.0615°N 4.6011°W, SN217435		Post-Medieval/Modern	PE383
The Llechryd Bridge over the River Teifi	Llechryd Bridge	Bridge	Manordeifi, (also Llangoedmor), (see also Ceredigion)	52.0623°N 4.601°W, SN218436		Post-Medieval/Modern	CD002
	Hut Groups, Cairns & Cliff Castle on Skomer Island	Limekiln	Marloes and St Brides	51.7408°N 5.2988°W, SM723098		Post-Medieval/Modern	PE181
	Blackpool Iron Furnace	Ironworks	Martletwy	51.7953°N 4.8066°W, SN065144		Post-Medieval/Modern	PE484
Coedcanlas Farm	Garden Earthworks at Coedcanlas Farm	Garden	Martletwy	51.7414°N 4.8859°W, SN008087		Post-Medieval/Modern	PE455
"Big House" at Landshipping	Landshipping House Garden Remains	Garden	Martletwy	51.7632°N 4.8695°W, SN020110		Post-Medieval/Modern	PE454
	Newton North Church	Church	Martletwy	51.7851°N 4.8056°W, SN065134		Post-Medieval/Modern	PE270
Haroldston House ruins	Haroldston House and Gardens	House (domestic)	Merlin's Bridge	51.7923°N 4.9628°W, SM957145		Post-Medieval/Modern	PE438
Old fort, Castle Point, Fishguard	Castle Point Old Fort	Fort	Fishguard and Goodwick	52.0013°N 4.9705°W, SM961378		Post-Medieval/Modern (18th century)	PE096
	American War of Independence Redan at Bath House	Artillery battery	Neyland	51.7044°N 4.9467°W, SM964047	Five-sided artillery battery dating to before 1763	Post-Medieval/Modern (18th century)	PE452
	Defensible Barracks, Pembroke Dock	Barracks	Pembroke Dock	51.6894°N 4.9518°W, SM960030		Post-Medieval/Modern (18th century)	PE379
Lime kiln, Kiln Park, Penally	Black Rock Quarry Lime Kilns	Kiln	Penally	51.6684°N 4.7192°W, SN121001		Post-Medieval/Modern (18th century)	PE436
	Rosemarket Dovecot	Dovecote	Rosemarket	51.7354°N 4.9646°W, SM954083		Post-Medieval/Modern (18th century)	PE224
	Lime Kilns	Kiln	Solva	51.8726°N 5.1905°W, SM804241		Post-Medieval/Modern (18th century)	PE378
	Cottage, Mill and Lime Kiln at Caerbwdy	Mill	St Davids and the Cathedral Close	51.8745°N 5.2452°W, SM767245		Post-Medieval/Modern (18th century)	PE429
Chapel Bay Fort	Chapel Bay Fort	Fort	Angle	51.6906°N 5.0992°W, SM858037		Post-Medieval/Modern (19th century)	PE333
Popton Fort	Fort Popton (Curtain Walls and Gun Emplacements only)	Fort	Angle	51.6937°N 5.0496°W, SM893038		Post-Medieval/Modern (19th century)	PE446
Dale Point Fort	Dale Point Fort (Unoccupied Parts)	Fort	Dale	51.7028°N 5.151°W, SM823052		Post-Medieval/Modern (19th century)	PE336
West Blockhouse Fort	West Blockhouse Fort	Fort	Dale	51.6883°N 5.1579°W, SM818035		Post-Medieval/Modern (19th century)	PE335
	South Hook Fort	Fort	Herbrandston	51.7075°N 5.0838°W, SM870054		Post-Medieval/Modern (19th century)	PE337
	Stack Rock Fort	Fort	Herbrandston	51.7025°N 5.0921°W, SM864049		Post-Medieval/Modern (19th century)	PE334
The sealed entrance to Scoveston Fort	Scoveston Fort	Fort	Llanstadwell	51.7206°N 4.9777°W, SM944066		Post-Medieval/Modern (19th century)	PE339
Hubberston Fort ramparts	Fort Hubberston	Fort	Milford Haven	51.7082°N 5.0548°W, SM890054	Mid-19th century fort which was in use in both world wars.	Post-Medieval/Modern (19th century)	PE338
Hakin observatory	Hakin Observatory	Observatory	Milford Haven	51.7126°N 5.0525°W, SM892059	Early 19th century observatory, part of an abortive attempt to set up a mathematical and technical college, now a housing estate near Milford Haven.	Post-Medieval/Modern (19th century)	PE387
Martello Tower, Pembroke Dock	South West Dockyard Tower, Pembroke Dock	Tower	Pembroke Dock	51.6939°N 4.9601°W, SM964038		Post-Medieval/Modern (19th century)	PE332
	Tramroad Incline at Saundersfoot	Incline Drumhouse	Saundersfoot	51.7135°N 4.7106°W, SN127052		Post-Medieval/Modern (19th century)	PE479
Footpath at Rhode Wood	Rhode Wood Shaft Mounds	Shaft Mounds	St Mary Out Liberty	51.705°N 4.6967°W, SN137043		Post-Medieval/Modern (19th century)	PE458
St Catherines Island and Fort from Castle Beach, Tenby	Fort St Catherine	Fort	Tenby	51.6707°N 4.692°W, SN139003		Post-Medieval/Modern (19th century)	PE450
	Gravel Bay anti-aircraft battery	Artillery battery	Angle	51.6657°N 5.0635°W, SM882007		Post-Medieval/Modern (20th century)	PE494
	Burton Beach Overlord Hard	Hard	Burton	51.7057°N 4.9188°W, SM984048		Post-Medieval/Modern (20th century)	PE531
Dale airfield runway	Dale Airfield	Airfield	Dale, (also Marloes and St Brides)	51.7166°N 5.1943°W, SM794068		Post-Medieval/Modern (20th century)	PE566
	Radar Station, Old Castle Head	Radar station	Manorbier	51.6363°N 4.7856°W, SS073967		Post-Medieval/Modern (20th century)	PE493
	First World War Practice Trenches, Penally Range	Practice trenches	Penally	51.6538°N 4.7304°W, SS112985		Post-Medieval/Modern (20th century)	PE483
	Chain Home Low Radar Station, Strumble Head	Radar station	Pencaer	52.0137°N 5.0806°W, SM886395		Post Medieval/Modern (20th century)	PE530
	Linney Tobruk Shelters	Coastal battery	Stackpole and Castlemartin	51.635°N 5.0513°W, SR889973		Post-Medieval/Modern (20th century)	PE534
	Trevallen Downs Tank Range	Firing range	Stackpole and Castlemartin	51.5998°N 4.9341°W, SR969930		Post-Medieval/Modern (20th century)	PE533

Scheduled Monuments in Pembrokeshire, Wales.
=Prehistoric =Roman =Early Medieval =Medieval =Post-Medieval/Modern

== See also ==
- List of Cadw properties
- List of castles in Wales
- List of hill forts in Wales
- Historic houses in Wales
- List of monastic houses in Wales
- List of museums in Wales
- List of Roman villas in Wales

== Notes ==
- Coflein is the online database of RCAHMW: Royal Commission on the Ancient and Historical Monuments of Wales, DAT is the Dyfed Archaeological Trust, Cadw is the Welsh Historic Monuments Agency
