= Flemish settlement in Pembrokeshire =

12th-century plantation in Wales

The Flemish settlement in Pembrokeshire was a movement of Flemish settlers in England to Little England beyond Wales, mostly in south Pembrokeshire in southwest Wales. This was a systematic plantation by Henry I, as a way to displace troublesome Flemish refugees and to influence Welsh affairs. Although it is believed that they created space for the English language to predominate over Welsh in the area, there is no known influence on language in the area.

== William of Normandy ==
Although Saxons were among the first foreign settlers in England, establishing the English language, quite a few Flemings also arrived after the Norman conquest of England. William of Normandy had been married to Matilda of Flanders and quite a number of Flemish nobles and soldiers had joined William in 1066.

== The Settlement: 1105-11 ==
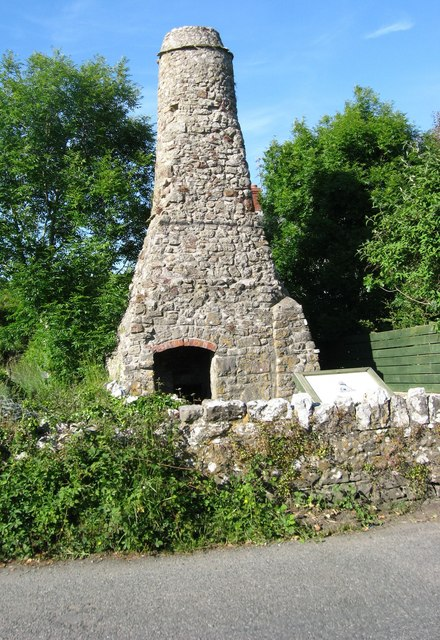
Carew Chimney (Flemish chimney)

In Henry I's reign in the early 12th century a wave of Flemish refugees arrived in England, escaping damage from floods that affected the coast of Flanders. At first they were given land on the eastern side of the Tweed before Henry I systematically planted the Flemish settlers in south Pembrokeshire.

Early documentary evidence of Flemish immigration from England, rather than directly from Flanders, is given by contemporary William of Malmesbury (1095–1143), who wrote:

King Henry removed all the Flemings in England into Wales. England contained so many of these Flemings...that the country was overburthened with them. Wherefore with the two-fold intent of clearing the land, and repressing the brutal audacity of the foe, he settled them with all their property and goods in Ros, a Welsh province.

The fact that they came via England, and that at that time the Flemish language was not markedly different from Old English, was likely to have influenced the English language becoming, and remaining, the dominant language of the area. According to Brut y Saeson:

When Christ was 1105 years old the Flemish from Flanders first came to King Henry to ask him for a place for them to live in; and told him that storms had come from the sea to their land and that it had destroyed the corn and the fruit and had swept it out to sea. And for that reason they could not live in that stormy land. And then they were sent to Rhos. And they completely seized that land. And Dyfed up to Milford Haven. And completely drove out the poor and needy people of that country.

A sixteenth-century writer, David Powel, who spuriously attributed his account to Caradoc of Llancarfan (fl. 1135), was more explicit:

In the year 1108 the rage of the sea did overflow and drowne a great part of the lowe countrie of Flanders in such sort that the inhabitants were driven to seek themselves other dwelling places, who came to King Henrie and desired him to give them some void place to remain in, who being verie liberall of that which was not his owne, gave them the land of Ros in Dyvet, or West Wales, where Pembroke, Tenby and Haverford are now built, and where they remaine to this daie, as may well be perceived by their speach and condition farre differing from the rest of the countrie.

As an increasing number of "foreigners" settled, the original inhabitants were driven away. It has been called a "process of ethnical cleansing". The Flemings showed a real zest for settling elsewhere, discarding the social fabric that was in place: they were "a brave and robust people, but very hostile to the Welsh and in a perpetual state of conflict with them".

== Henry II ==
According to George Owen, writing in 1603, under the orders of the new King Henry II, a second wave of Flemings, mainly soldiers and mercenaries, were sent to Pembrokeshire, next to Rhys ap Gruffydd's West Wales territories in 1155 , but this was mainly driven by the desire to have the warmongering Flemings (the "Flemish wolves") out of his way.

== High Middle Ages ==
What followed, starting with the reign of Edward I in the late 13th century, was 100 years of peace, particularly in "Little England", marked by the Edwardian conquest of Wales, which must have compounded the tendency of Welsh to become a minor language in the region.

During and after Owain Glyndŵr's revolt in the early 15th century, in which fighting took place in "Little England", came punitive laws affecting Wales, though these were, for reasons historians have not been able to ascertain, applied less rigorously here than elsewhere in Wales.

== Local influence ==
Haverfordwest and Tenby consequently grew as important settlements for the Flemish settlers. In Tenby, a castle and a church was erected for the Flemish colonists.

The Flemish were experts in the woollen trade, and this flourished in the area.

The Normans and the Flemings built a line of over 50 castles – most of them earthworks – to protect south Pembrokeshire. This line of castles is known as the Landsker (old Norse for 'divide') and stretched from Newgale on the west coast to Amroth on the south east coast. The Landsker line represented a divide in language and custom in Pembrokeshire that remains tangible today.

== Rise of English ==
The Flemish language did not survive in the local dialect. Ranulf Higdon in his Polychronicon (1327) stated that Flemish was by his time extinct in southwest Wales, and George Owen in 1603 was adamant that Flemish was long extinct.

Although the initial planting of Flemish was a move by Norman rulers, the influx of Flemings into south Pembrokeshire appeared to be so significant that Flemish allowed for English to become the dominant language in the region.

== Sources ==
- Fenton, Richard (1811). A historical tour through Pembrokeshire. Longman, Hurst, Rees, Orme & co. pp. 149–151.
- Laws, Edward (1888). The History of Little England Beyond Wales. Bell, London. pp. 107–119.
- Owen, George (1892). The Description of Pembrokeshire. Chas. J. Clark.
