= Llawhaden Bridge =

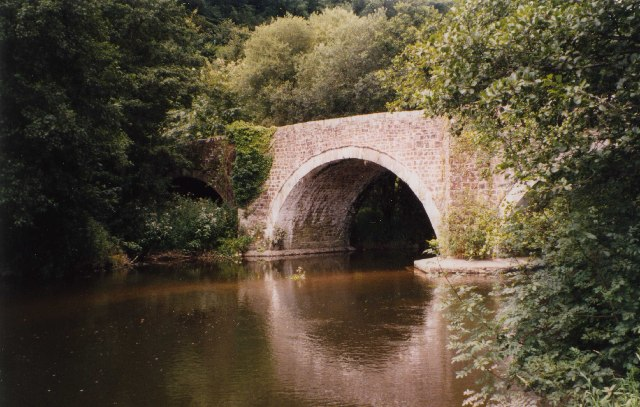
- Llawhaden Bridge in 1998
- Coordinates: 51.8202°N 4.7938°W
- Crosses: Eastern Cleddau
- Locale: Llawhaden, West Wales
- Heritage status: Grade II*

Characteristics
- Design: Arch bridge

Llawhaden Bridge is a Grade II* listed medieval stone arch bridge spanning the Eastern Cleddau river near Llawhaden village in Pembrokeshire, Wales, in the community of Llawhaden and about 1 mile (1.6 km) upstream of the river's tidal limit at Canaston Bridge. It is a scheduled ancient monument.

== Location ==
The bridge carries a minor road indirectly from the village of Llawhaden across the river towards Clynderwen and Narberth. The bridge is on the Landsker Borderlands Trail.

== History ==
The present structure dates from the mid-18th century. The Royal Commission states that the bridge dates from the 18th century, but says this is disputed. The earliest known illustration of a bridge below the castle is 1740.

The original bridge was probably altered or rebuilt by the Skyrme family of Llawhaden House when they established a corn mill and a new left-bank road in 1765.

The bridge fell into decay over the rest of the 18th century and John Rees (another reliable source says James) of Nevern was contracted to repair it in 1809. His contract for £190 included maintenance for seven years, and part of the works included new parapets and river walls. The west arch, originally over the tail-race of the mill, became a land arch when the race dried up following the mill's falling out of use.

Other remedial work was carried out subsequently.

== Structure ==
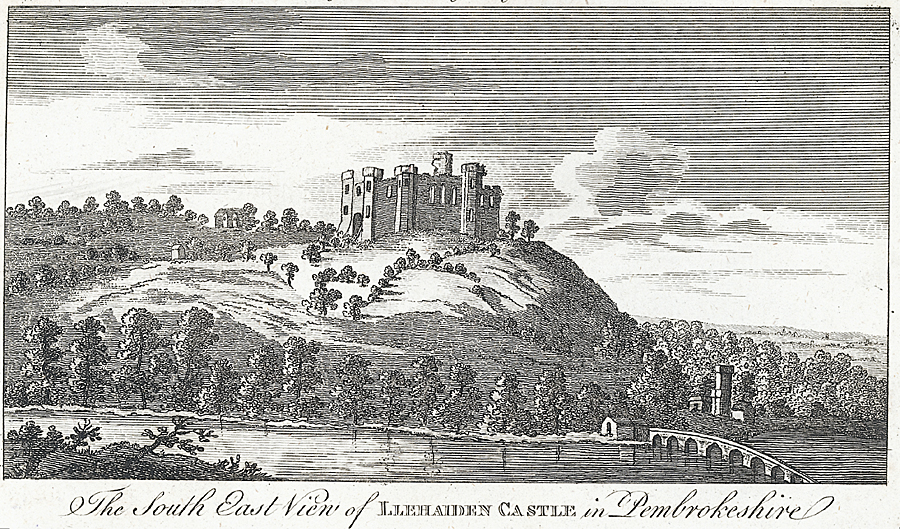
1769 engraving showing part of the bridge

A 1740 engraving of Llawhaden Castle shows the bridge with five arches and another in 1769 shows the bridge with possibly more than seven. The listing includes the river bank wall. The bridge was not named on a pre-1850 parish map, but is marked as an ancient monument on modern maps.

The 1809 reconstruction reduced the bridge to three semicircular arches. The central arch spans about 10 metres (33 ft), with the other two arches slightly smaller. The carriageway is 4.5 metres (15 ft) wide. The two piers have cutwaters, which rise to pedestrian refuges. The east pier, and the only one now standing permanently in water, has had modern protective work. The east parapet extends some way beyond the bridge.

The main arches are constructed of ashlar limestone, and the parapets are rubble stone.
