= Ambleston =

Village, parish and community in Pembrokeshire, Wales

Ambleston: Welsh: Treamlod
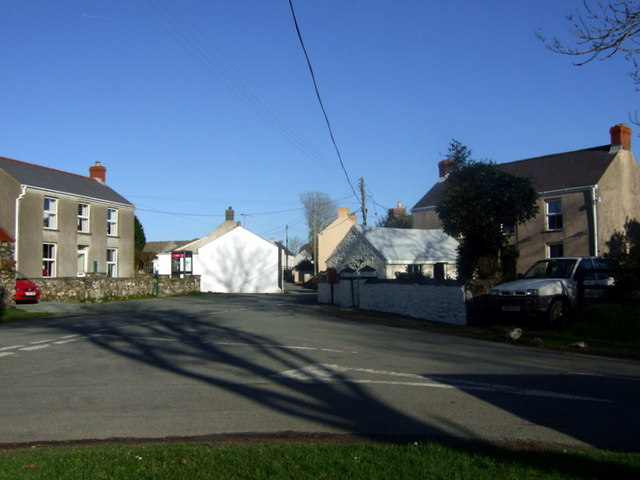

- Location within Pembrokeshire
- Population: 382 (2011)
- OS grid reference: SN000257
- Principal area: Pembrokeshire
- Country: Wales
- Sovereign state: United Kingdom
- Post town: HAVERFORDWEST
- Postcode district: SA62
- Post town: CLARBESTON ROAD
- Postcode district: SA63
- Police: Dyfed-Powys
- Fire: Mid and West Wales
- Ambulance: Welsh
- UK Parliament: Preseli Pembrokeshire
- Senedd Cymru – Welsh Parliament: Ceredigion Penfro
- List of places UK Wales Pembrokeshire 51.8948°N 4.9067°W Map of the community

Ambleston (Welsh: Treamlod) is a village, parish, and community in Pembrokeshire, Wales, lying seven miles (11 km) north-north-east of Haverfordwest. The parish includes the hamlets of Wallis and Woodstock (Welsh: Wstog).

== Name ==
The English and Welsh placenames both mean "Amlot's farm", Amlot being a Norman-French personal name.

== Location and demographics ==
The northern border of the parish is an ancient trackway leading towards St David's, which crosses through a Roman farmstead called "Castell Fflemish". This line is also the northern boundary of the cantref of Daugleddau, and was described by George Owen in 1602 as the language frontier, placing Ambleston in Little England beyond Wales.

Ambleston was one of the parishes Owen described as bilingual, and in modern times it was predominantly Welsh-speaking. The 2011 census showed 34.3 per cent of Ambleston community's population could speak Welsh, a fall from 39.4 per cent in 2001. Historically, the percentage of Welsh speakers was 86 (1891): 79 (1931): 57 (1971).

In 1934, a small part of the parish was transferred to the parish of St Dogmells. The pre-1934 parish had an area of 3,850 acres (1,560 ha). Its census populations were: 421 (1801): 598 (1851): 386 (1901): 358 (1951): 309 (1981).

The community had a population of 367 in 2001 increasing to 382 at the 2011 census.

== Governance ==
With the communities of Spittal and Wiston, it makes up the Pembrokeshire electoral ward of Wiston.

== Archaeology and history ==
A kilometer north of the village is a four-sided low bank enclosing an area some 80m across, at 51.904°N 4.8981°W, SN007267. The feature had been presumed to relate to Roman military activity, and became known as Castle Flemish, or Castell Ffleming. It also came to be associated with the name 'Ad Vigessimum', a fort described by Richard of Cirencester, but this is now thought spurious. An excavation in 1922 by Mortimer Wheeler found Roman brick and flue tiles, along with various Roman ceramics and roof tiles. These indicate a compound including a bathhouse and living area, and is considered to be a late first-century farmstead or villa. In the nineteenth century there were rumours of a 'golden table' being found here but these remain unsubstantiated. The site is a Scheduled ancient monument.

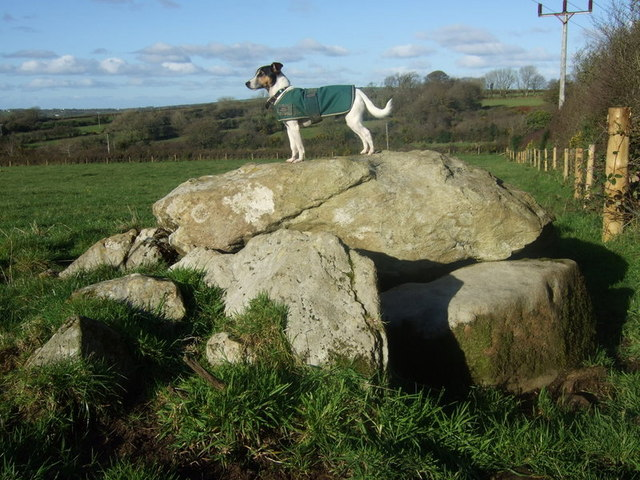
Parc-y-Llyn burial chamber

A second ancient monument is also in Ambleston Community. Parc-y-Llyn Burial Chamber is at 51.9012°N 4.9343°W, SM982265. Potentially a Neolithic chambered tomb, this feature has a capstone 2.0 m across resting on four low uprights. It was first noted in 1871 and scheduled in 1938, and a Neolithic origin would date it to 4400 to 2900 BC. However an absence of substantiating finds mean questions have been raised about its authenticity.

A 1578 map in the British Library shows the parish.

There are seven listed buildings and other structures in the community.

== See also ==
- List of Scheduled Roman to modern Monuments in Pembrokeshire
