= Landsker Borderlands Trail =

60-mile footpath in west Wales

Coordinates: 51.819°N 4.614°W

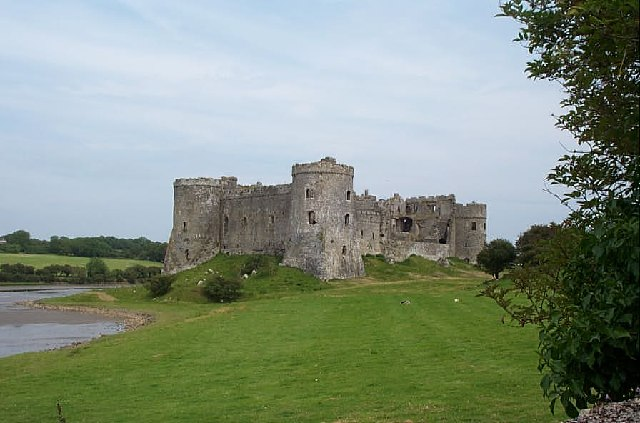
- Carew Castle lies on the trail
- Length: 60 mi (97 km)
- Location: Wales
- Trailheads: Whitland
- Use: Hiking

The Landsker Borderlands Trail is a waymarked circular long distance footpath running through Pembrokeshire and Carmarthenshire in West Wales

== The route ==
The route takes the walker away from the popular tourist locations and explores the Landsker Line between the Welsh language speaking north of Pembrokeshire and the English speaking south Pembrokeshire area - Little England beyond Wales - and includes the land to the east of the River Cleddau estuary, Ogham stones in the walk of Llandissilio parish church; and the Norman castles sited within this region at Llawhaden and Carew Castle as well as prehistoric remains at Llawhaden.

Landsker is a Norse word for borderland. The route was devised by The South Pembrokeshire Action for Rural Communities (SPARC) to attract walkers and tourists away from the well known coastal hot-spots into the lesser known hinterlands.
