= Waldo Williams =

Welsh poet and pacifist (1904–1971)

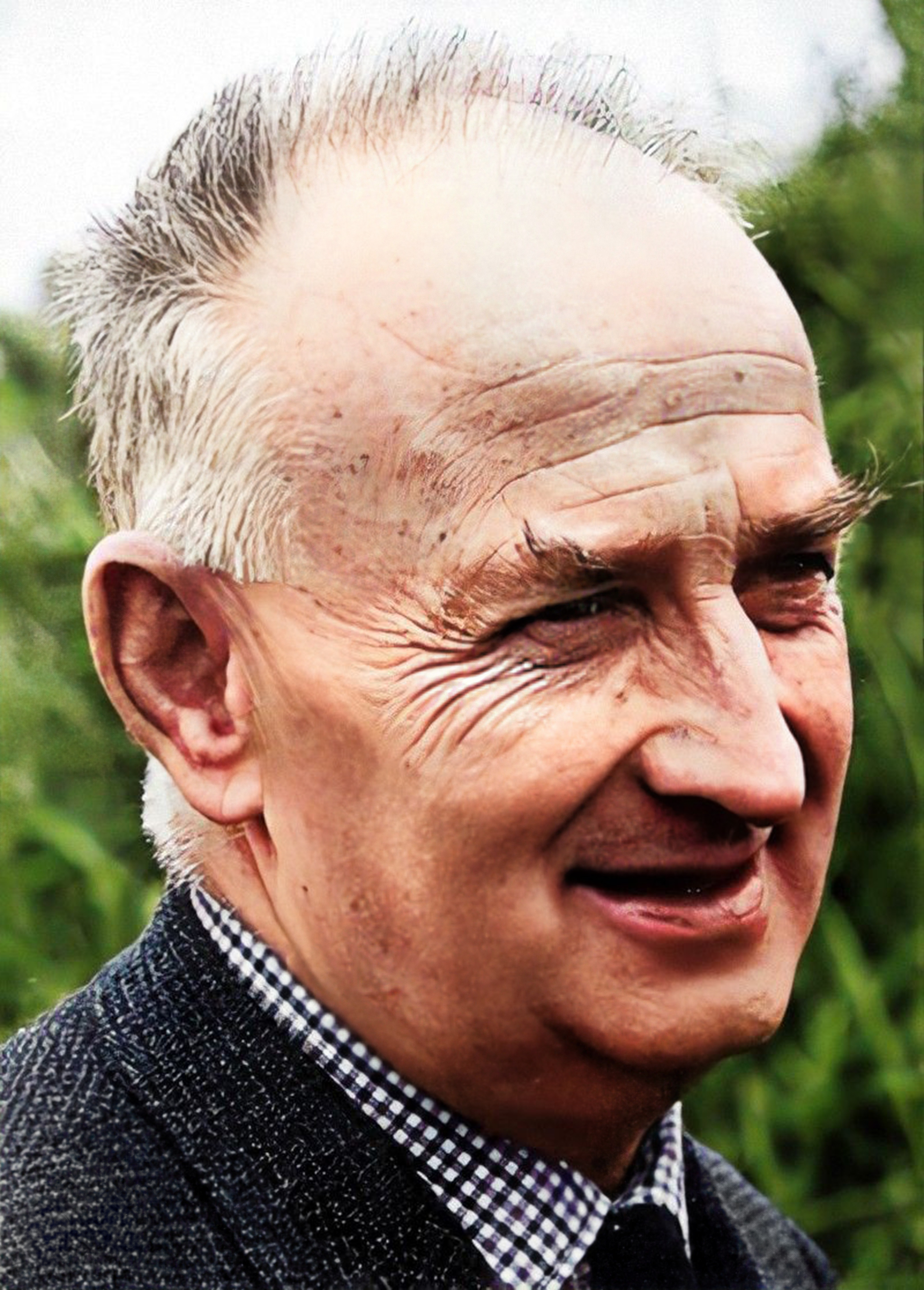
- Waldo Williams in 1960
- Born: 30 September 1904; Haverfordwest, Pembrokeshire, Wales
- Died: 20 May 1971 (aged 66); Haverfordwest, Pembrokeshire, Wales
- Occupations: Poet, teacher and political campaigner
- Known for: Poetry, pacifism

Waldo Goronwy Williams (30 September 1904 – 20 May 1971) was one of the leading Welsh-language poets of the 20th century. He was also a notable Christian pacifist, anti-war campaigner, and Welsh nationalist. He is often referred to by his first name only.

== Life ==
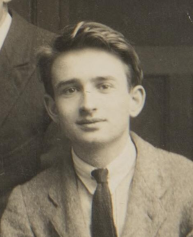
Waldo Williams in the Aberystwyth Students Union Committee circa 1925

Waldo Goronwy Williams was born in Haverfordwest, Pembrokeshire, the third child of John Edwal Williams (1863–1934), headmaster of Prendergast primary school in Haverfordwest, and his wife Angharad Williams (1875–1932). His father spoke both Welsh and English, but his mother only spoke English, as did Waldo himself in his early years.

In 1911 Waldo's father was appointed head of the primary school at Mynachlog-ddu, Pembrokeshire. There Waldo learnt to speak Welsh. In 1915 his father moved again, to be head of Brynconin School, the primary school at Llandissilio, Pembrokeshire. Waldo was raised as a Baptist and baptised as a member of Blaenconin Baptist Chapel in 1921 at the age of 16.

After attending the grammar school at Narberth, Pembrokeshire, Waldo studied at the University College of Wales, Aberystwyth, where he graduated in English in 1926. He then trained as a teacher: he taught in various schools in Pembrokeshire and the rest of Wales and England, including Kimbolton School, Huntingdonshire. He also taught night classes for the Department of Extra-Mural Studies at the University College of Wales, Aberystwyth.

In the 1920s and 1930s, Waldo was a friend and supporter of Willie Jenkins (Hoplas), one of the pioneers of the Independent Labour Party (ILP) and the Labour Party in Pembrokeshire. Willie Jenkins was a pacifist, who had been imprisoned as a conscientious objector in the First World War; he stood as Labour candidate for Pembrokeshire in four elections between 1922 and 1935. Waldo's famous poem "Cofio" (Remembering) was written in 1931 during a visit to Willie Jenkins's farm at Hoplas, Rhoscrowther, near Pembroke.

Waldo married Linda Llewellyn in 1941. Her death in 1943 caused him anguish and distress. He never remarried. Later he would describe his two-year marriage as "fy mlynyddoedd mawr" – "my great years".

Waldo was a conscientious objector in the Second World War, which led to his dismissal from a headmastership. During the Korean War (1950–1953) he refused to pay his income tax on pacifist grounds as a protest against the war and forced military conscription – a protest he continued until compulsory military service ended in 1963 and all the conscripted had been released. His goods were sequestrated by bailiffs and he was twice imprisoned in the early 1960s for refusing to pay his income tax.

Meanwhile in the 1950s he joined the Quakers at Milford Haven.

Waldo Williams's volume of poetry Dail Pren (Leaves of the Tree) was published in 1956 by Gwasg Gomer. It has been described as the most outstanding work of Welsh language poetry published since 1945.

By the 1950s, partly influenced by his friend D. J. Williams, Waldo Williams had become a supporter of Plaid Cymru. In the 1959 General Election he stood as a parliamentary candidate for Plaid Cymru in the Pembrokeshire constituency, winning 4.32 per cent (2,253) of the votes.

In the late 1960s, Waldo Williams taught Welsh to children of age 10-11 at the Holy Name Catholic School, Fishguard, Pembrokeshire. He is said described by his students as a passionate and enthusiastic teacher. He often used wooden silhouettes of farm animals with their names painted in Welsh to teach students.

== Death and legacy ==
Waldo Williams died in 1971 at St Thomas's Hospital, Haverfordwest. He was buried at the Blaenconin Baptist Chapel burial ground in Llandissilio, with his parents and his wife Linda. There is a memorial at Rhos-fach, near to his childhood home in Mynachlog-ddu.

In 2019, Waldo Williams Primary School in Haverfordwest was named in his honour.

The Waldo Williams room at Friends House, London, UK is named after him.

Waldo’s lounge is a new eating and drinking establishment opened in late 2024 in Haverfordwest town centre. This is named after the poet himself

== Poetry ==
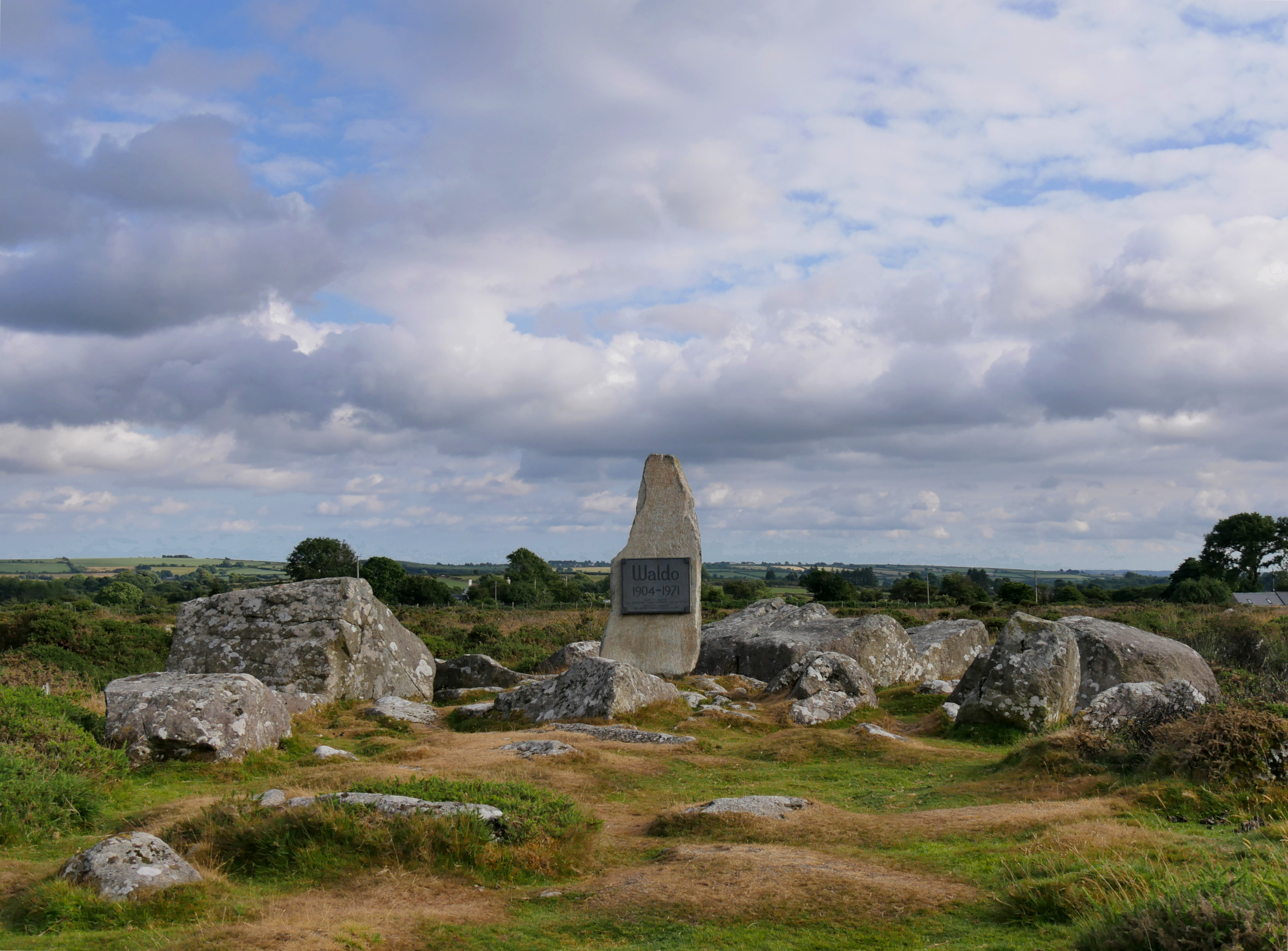
Waldo Williams memorial, Rhos-fach, Mynachlog-ddu

Waldo Williams's poetry shows many influences, ranging from William Wordsworth and Walt Whitman to Welsh hymns and the strict alliterative metres of traditional Welsh poetry, known as cynghanedd.

He was within the Welsh tradition of the bardd gwlad, poets who served a locality by recording its life and people in verse. He took as his moral anchor the cooperative, harmonious living he saw in the farming communities in the Preseli Hills. A mystical revelation about the unity of humankind, which he experienced in his youth, affected him deeply. Belonging to a humane local community, and desiring that people live together in peace, are constant themes in his poetry. This revelation inspired some of his greatest poetry, including "Mewn dau gae" (In two fields, 1956), perhaps his greatest of all. Other well-known poems of his include "Cofio" (Remembering, 1931), "Y tangnefeddwyr" (The peacemakers, 1941), "Preseli" (1946), and "Pa beth yw dyn?" (What is it to be human? 1952).

== Important events in life ==
- 1911 – Moves to Mynachlog-ddu, Pembrokeshire, when his father becomes head of the primary school.
- 1915 – Moves to Llandissilio, Pembrokeshire, when his father is appointed head of the primary school.
- 1917 – Attends grammar school at Narberth.
- 1923 – Begins studies at University College of Wales, Aberystwyth.
- 1926 – Graduates in English and trains as a teacher.
- 1928 – Begins to teach at various primary schools in Pembrokeshire.
- 1931 – "Cofio" (Remembering) – inspired by a visit to the farm of his friend Willie Jenkins at Hoplas, Rhoscrowther
- 1936 – Publication of Cerddi'r plant (Poems for Children) jointly with E Llwyd Williams
- 1938 – "Y Tŵr a'r Graig" (The Tower and the Rock) – a milestone in which Waldo contrasts the independent judgement he valued in a Pembrokeshire community with the militarism of the state
- 1941 – Marries Linda Llewellyn in Blaenconin chapel (April)
- 1941 – "Y tangnefeddwyr" (The peacemakers) – a poem of love for his parents and peacemakers, in response to the horror at the bombing of Swansea
- 1942 – Conscientious objector to military service on pacifist grounds, conditionally exempted by the South Wales Tribunal sitting at Carmarthen (February 1942)
- 1942 – Moves from Pembrokeshire with his wife to the Llŷn Peninsula in north-west Wales, to teach at Botwnnog County School (1 March 1942).
- 1943 – Linda Llewellyn dies of tuberculosis on 1 June 1943. Waldo is grief-stricken.
- 1945 – Leaves Llŷn for England, working in schools in Kimbolton and Lyneham, Wiltshire, 1945–1948.
- 1949 – Returns to Wales as a supply teacher in Builth Wells.
- 1950 – Returns to Pembrokeshire for the rest of his life, teaching in schools and at extramural classes.
- 1950 – The Korean War: Williams resigns from teaching to begin a protest of non-payment of income tax against the war. This continues until the end of compulsory military service in 1963. Bailiffs sequestrated his possessions and ultimately he was imprisoned.
- 1953 – Joins the Religious Society of Friends (Quakers).
- 1956 – Publication of Dail Pren (The Leaves of the Tree)
- 1959 – Stands as Plaid Cymru candidate in the Pembrokeshire constituency at the general election. Receives 2,253 votes (4.3%).
- 1960 – Imprisoned for six weeks in Swansea Prison for non-payment of income tax.
- 1961 – Imprisoned again for non-payment of income tax, in Ashwell Prison, Rutland, in February–March 1961.
- 1963 – Resumes teaching at various primary schools in Pembrokeshire.
- 1971 – Suffers a stroke and dies in St Thomas's Hospital, Haverfordwest.

== Published works ==
- Dail Pren (The Leaves of the Tree, 1956), the only volume of poetry for adults published by Waldo Williams in his lifetime; a new edition was published in 1991 by Gwasg Gomer, with an introduction by Mererid Hopwood
- Cerddi Waldo Williams (The Poems of Waldo Williams) (1992), a selection of his poetry edited by J. E. Caerwyn Williams
- Waldo Williams: rhyddiaith (Waldo Williams: Prose) (2001), edited by Damian Walford Davies – a selection of his prose writings in both Welsh and English
- Cerddi'r plant (Poems for children, 1936), poems by Waldo Williams and by E. Llwyd Williams
- The Old Farmhouse (1961) – Waldo Williams's translation into English of Yr hen dy ffarm by D. J. Williams (1953)
- Waldo Williams: Cerddi 1922–1970 (Poems 1922–1970) (2012), ed. Alan Llwyd and Robert Rhys – a comprehensive collection of Waldo Williams's poetry

== Translations of his work ==
A significant collection of Waldo Williams's poetry has been translated into English by Tony Conran. Work of his has also been translated by the former Archbishop of Canterbury, Rowan Williams and by Joseph P. Clancy.

== See also ==
- List of peace activists
