= Woodstock, Pembrokeshire =

Village in Pembrokeshire, Wales

Coordinates: 51.893°N 4.878°W

Woodstock: Welsh: Wstog
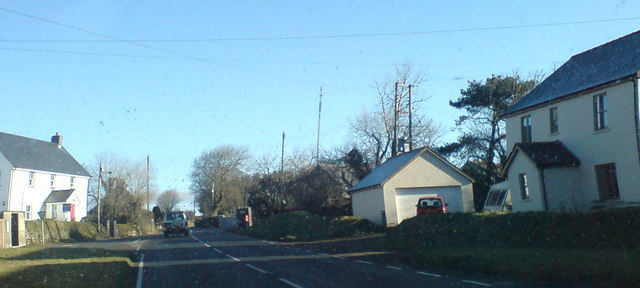
- The main road through the village

- Location within Pembrokeshire
- OS grid reference: SN020255
- Community: Ambleston
- Principal area: Pembrokeshire
- Preserved county: Dyfed
- Country: Wales
- Sovereign state: United Kingdom
- Postcode district: SA
- Police: Dyfed-Powys
- Fire: Mid and West Wales
- Ambulance: Welsh
- UK Parliament: Preseli Pembrokeshire
- Senedd Cymru – Welsh Parliament: Preseli Pembrokeshire

Woodstock (Welsh: Wstog) is a village in the southern foothills of the Preseli Mountains in the community and parish of Ambleston, Pembrokeshire, Wales. There is a built-up area on the B4329 former turnpike, and another down a side-road, close to, but with no road access to Llys y Fran reservoir.

== Name ==
According to a pre-1850 parish map, the area on the B4329 was named Woodstock Slop, and the other just Woodstock. The Welsh name does not appear on parish or Ordnance Survey maps before the 20th century, but the Methodists were using the name in 1913.

== History ==
Close to Woodstock village is Woodstock Ring, a prehistoric earthwork containing the possible traces of a building within, indicating habitation in prehistoric times.

Woodstock has been described as a modern village but the manor of Woodstock (along with that of Ambleston) was bequeathed by Sir James Perrot, son of Sir John Perrot to Francis Perrot, and then in 1642 to his nephew Herbert. In 1761, Herbert's descendant Sir John Perrot sold Woodstock to Admiral Thomas Tucker. The manor is mentioned many times in respect of indentures, grants and tenancies in the 17th and 18th centuries. In 1717, Woodstock mill was leased to yeoman Lewis John.

Richard Fenton, in 1811, recorded passing through Woodstock, stating that the name came from an extensive manor owned in early times by Huko Hywel, whose daughters married Normans, and that the manor eventually came into the possession of the Perrott family.

James Hartley Jones, whose name appears on the Ambleston War Memorial, is recorded as having enlisted at Woodstock (he lived in the nearby hamlet of Wallis) early in World War I.

== Chapel ==
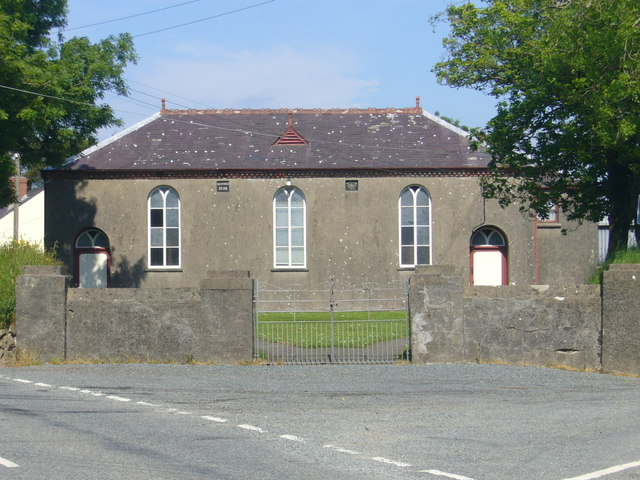
Woodstock C.M. Chapel

Fenton noted that a chapel of ease to Ambleston parish existed in the village, but had long since ceased to exist, and the cemetery had been ploughed.

Woodstock Calvinistic Methodist Chapel was founded by the Reverend Howel Davies. It was built in 1755, the first Methodist chapel in Pembrokeshire, and was rebuilt in 1809 and restored in 1890. The chapel is a Grade II listed building.

== School ==
A school was opened in Woodstock in 1869 and closed in the 1960s. School records are kept by Dyfed Family History Society.
