= Castle Flemish =

Roman farmstead in Ambleston

Castle Flemish or Castell Fflemish is a Roman farmstead in Ambleston. Its name may derive from the Flemish settlement in Pembrokeshire.

It is a kilometer north of Ambleston and is a four-sided low bank enclosing an area some 80m across, at 51.904°N 4.8981°W, SN007267. The feature had been presumed to relate to Roman military activity, and became known as Castle Flemish, or Castell Ffleming. It also came to be associated with the name 'Ad Vigessimum', a fort described by Richard of Cirencester, but this is now thought spurious. An excavation in 1922 by Mortimer Wheeler found Roman brick and flue tiles, along with various Roman ceramics and roof tiles. These indicate a compound including a bathhouse and living area, and is considered to be a late first-century farmstead or villa. In the nineteenth century there were rumours of a 'golden table' being found here but these remain unsubstantiated. The site is a Scheduled ancient monument.

A public road, which is also the Ambelston/Puncheston boundary, runs through the middle.
