= Brut y Saeson =

Welsh-language chronicle

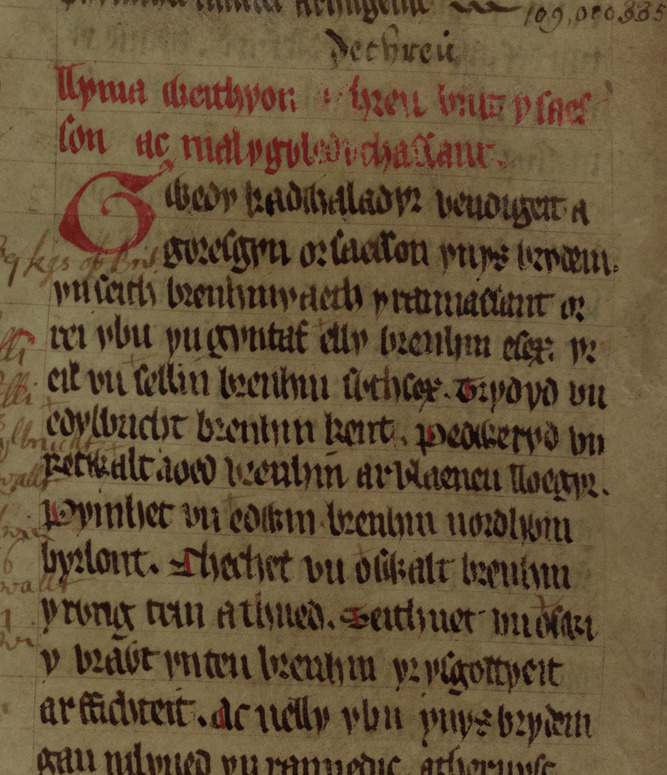
Opening lines of Brut y Saeson (Red Book of Hergest version, Oxford, Jesus MS 111: Llyma weithyon dechreu brut y saesson ac mal y gwledychassant ... ('Here is the beginning of the Chronicle of the English and how they ruled...')

Brut y Saeson (also Brut y Saesson) is a Welsh-language chronicle running from the death of Cadwaladr ap Cadwallon in 682 to the reign of Richard II (1377–99) of England. The name means the brut or chronicle of the English.

It is found in three related manuscripts from the late fourteenth or early fifteenth century, two of which are held by the National Library of Wales in Aberystwyth (Peniarth 19 and Peniarth 32) and one of which is at Oxford (Jesus College 111, 'The Red Book of Hergest'). The version in Peniarth 19 breaks off in AD 979.

It has been described by Professor Huw Pryce as 'a striking witness to how long-established notions in Wales of the Britons' loss of sovereignty over Britain could sustain an interest in English as well as Welsh history'.

== See also ==
- Brut y Brenhinedd ('the Chronicle of the Kings')
- Brut y Tywysogion ('the Chronicle of the Princes')
- Brenhinoedd y Saeson ('the Kings of the English')
- Annales Cambriae ('the Annals of Wales')
