= George Owen Harry =

Welsh antiquarian

- Occupation: Antiquarian

George Owen Harry (fl. 1604) was a Welsh antiquarian.

== Biography ==
Harry was the son of William Owen. He became the rector of Whitchurch, or Eglwys-Wen, in the hundred of Cemmaes, Pembrokeshire. His printed works are: 1. ‘The Genealogy of the high and mighty Monarch James … King of Great Brittayne, with his lineall descent from Noah by divers direct lynes to Brutus; … with a briefe Cronologie of the memorable Acts of the famous men touched in this Genealogie, with many other matters worthy of note,’ London, 1604, 4to. This book, which was composed at the request of Robert Holland, is, when accompanied by all the plates, uncommonly rare. 2. ‘The Well-sprynge of True Nobility.’

He compiled in 1602 a manuscript volume showing the state of Wales at that period (for some extracts see Gent. Mag. for 1823). To Browne Willis's ‘Survey of the Cathedral Church of St. David's,’ 1717, are appended ‘some memoirs relating thereto, and the county adjacent, from a MS. wrote about the latter end of Queen Elizabeth's reign.’ The manuscript is believed to have been written by George Owen Harry for the use of Camden, who acknowledges his assistance in the account of Pembrokeshire in the ‘Britannia.’ Richard Fenton, in his ‘Historical Tour through Pembrokeshire,’ 1811, has liberally quoted from Harry's manuscripts.
