= Little England beyond Wales =

Area in Wales

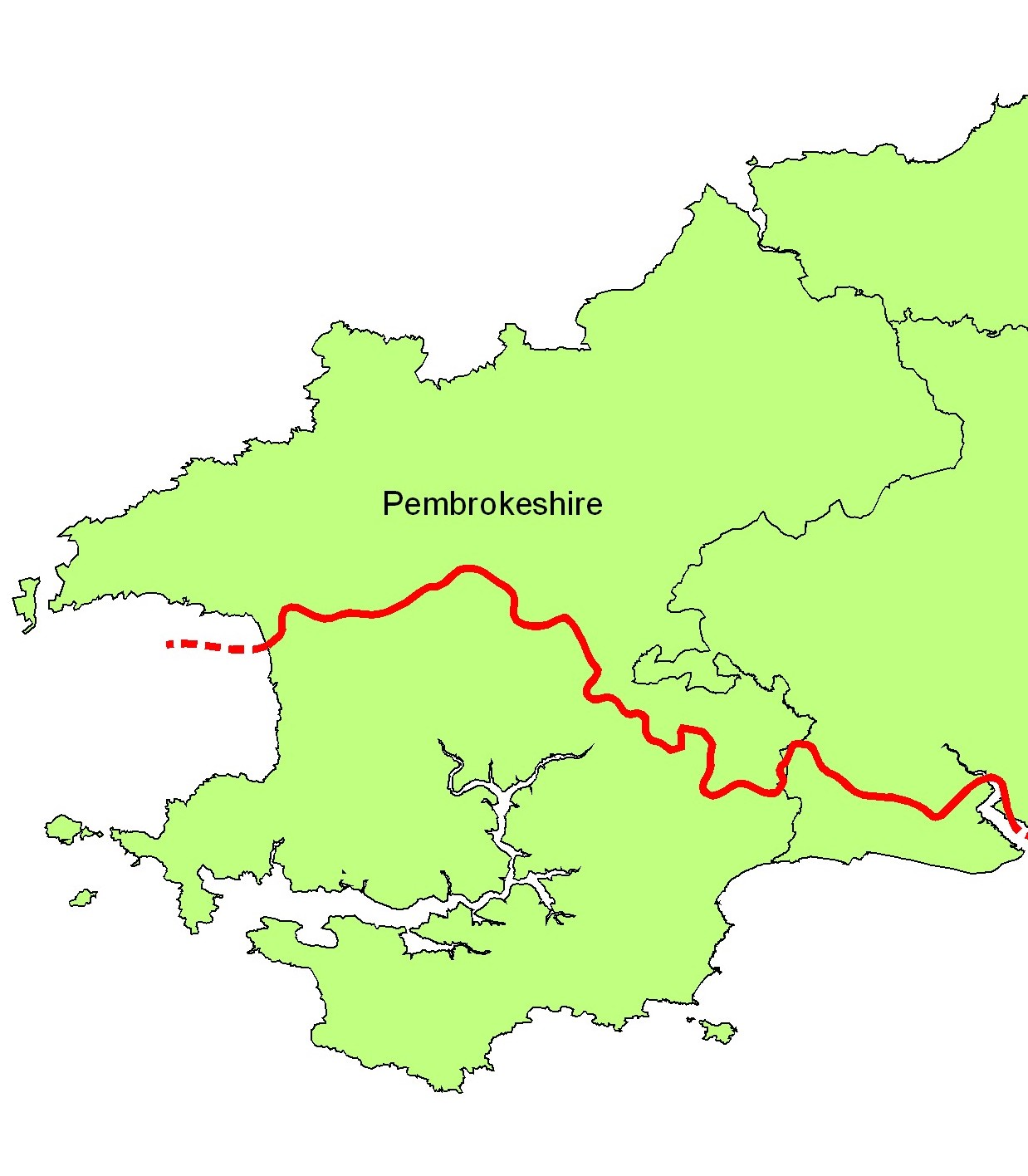
Landsker Line envisaged in 1901

Little England beyond Wales is a name that has been applied to an area of southern Pembrokeshire and southwestern Carmarthenshire in Wales, which has been English rather than Welsh in language and culture for many centuries despite its remoteness from England. Its origins may lie in the Irish, Norse, Norman, Flemish and Saxon settlement that took place in this area more than in other areas of South West Wales. Its northern boundary is known as the Landsker Line.

A number of writers and scholars, ancient and modern, have discussed how and when this difference came about, and why it should persist, with no clear explanation coming to the fore.

== Etymology ==
The language boundary between this region and the area to the north where Welsh is more commonly spoken, sometimes known as the Landsker Line, is noted for its sharpness and resilience. Although it is probably much older, the first known approximation of "Little England beyond Wales" was in the 16th century, when William Camden called the area Anglia Transwalliana.

== History ==
Between 350 and 400, an Irish tribe known as the Déisi settled in the region known to the Romans as Demetae. The Déisi merged with the local Welsh, with the regional name underlying Demetae evolving into Dyfed (410–920), which existed as an independent petty kingdom. The area became part of the kingdom of Deheubarth (920–1197), but it is unclear when it became distinguished from other parts of Wales. Welsh scholar Dr B. G. Charles surveyed the evidence for early non-Welsh settlements in the area. The Norse raided in the 9th and 10th centuries, and some may have settled, as they did in Gwynedd further north. There are scattered Scandinavian placenames in the area, mostly in the Hundred of Roose, north and west of the River Cleddau. The medieval Welsh chronicle Brut y Tywysogion mentions many battles in southwest Wales and sackings of Menevia (St David's) in the pre-Norman period. Sometimes these were stated to be conflicts with Saxons, sometimes with people of unspecified origin. The Saxons influenced the language. John Trevisa, writing in 1387, said:

Both the Flemynges that woneth in the west side of Wales. Nabbeth y left here strange speech, and speketh Saxon lych y now.

=== Arnulf's Rebellion ===
Arnulf de Montgomery the Earl of Pembroke rose in revolt against Henry I and was as a result disinherited. Up to that point Pembroke had been a fairly typical Marcher county, but after the rebellion was put down it became far more like an English shire, with intermediate landholders enjoying more independence.

=== Flemish settlement ===
The Flemish immigration was of Flemish people from England, rather than directly from Flanders, and first started in 1105. A last batch of Flemings were sent to southwest Wales by King Henry in about 1111. Unsurprisingly, then, the Flemish language did not survive in the local dialect.

According to George Owen of Henllys, writing in 1603, in 1155, under the orders of the new King Henry II, another wave of Flemings were sent to Rhys ap Gruffydd's West Wales territories.

Gerald of Wales (c.1146-c.1223) and Brut y Tywysogyon recorded that "Flemings" were settled in south Pembrokeshire soon after the Norman invasion of Wales in the early 12th century. Gerald says this took place specifically in Roose. The Flemish were noted for their skill in the construction of castles, which were built throughout the Norman territories in Pembrokeshire. The previous inhabitants were said to have "lost their land", but this could mean either a total expulsion of the existing population, or merely a replacement of the land-owning class.

=== Castle building and peace ===
The development of Haverfordwest as the castle and borough controlling Roose dates from this period; this plantation occurred under the auspices of the Norman invaders. The Normans placed the whole of southwest Wales under military control, establishing castles over the entire area, as far north as Cardigan.

What followed, starting with the reign of Edward I in the late 13th century, was 100 years of peace, particularly in "Little England", marked by the Edwardian conquest of Wales, which must have compounded the tendency of Welsh to become a minor language in the region. With the failure of Owain Glyndŵr's revolt in the early 15th century, in which no fighting took place in "little England", came punitive laws affecting Wales, though these were, for reasons historians have not been able to ascertain, applied less rigorously here than elsewhere in Wales.

=== Tudor period ===
National awareness of the region was made much of in the 15th century with the birth of Henry Tudor at Pembroke Castle and his eventual accession to the English throne after beginning his campaign in southwest Wales. At the end of the Tudor period, George Owen produced his Description of Penbrokshire (sic), completed in 1603. The work is essentially a geographical analysis of the languages in the county, and his writings provide the vital source for all subsequent commentators. He is the first to emphasize the sharpness of the linguistic boundary. He said:

...yet do these two nations keep each from dealings with the other, as mere strangers, so that the meaner sort of people will not, or do not usually, join together in marriage, although they be in one hundred (and sometimes in the same parish), nor commerce nor buy but in open fairs, so that you shall find in one parish a pathway parting the Welsh and English, and the one side speak all English, the other all Welsh, and differing in tilling and in measuring of their land, and divers other matters.

Of Little England, he added:

(They) keep their language among themselves without receiving the Welsh speech or learning any part thereof, and hold themselves so close to the same that to this day they wonder at a Welshman coming among them, the one neighbour saying to the other "Look there goeth a Welshman".

Owen described the linguistic frontier in some detail, and his 1603 line is shown on the map. His description indicates that some northern parts had been re-colonised by Welsh speakers. The disruptions of the post-Black Death period may account for this.

=== Modern period ===
Proportion of Welsh speakers (2011 census). The "Little England" mentioned is the pale green tip at the southwest, where there are fewer Welsh speakers.

Although Little England is described by several later writers (other than Edward Laws (Note: See further reading, below)), they do little but quote Owen. Richard Fenton in his Historical Tour of 1810 observed that churches in the south of the county were more likely to have spires than those in the north. Quantitative descriptions of the linguistic geography of the area start with that of Ernst Georg Ravenstein, around 1870. This shows a further shrinkage since Owen's time. From 1891 onward, linguistic affiliation in Wales has been assessed in the census. The overall picture is that the boundary has moved to a significant, but small degree. Furthermore, the boundary has always been described as sharp. In 1972, Brian John said of the linguistic boundary that it "is a cultural feature of surprising tenacity; it is quite as discernible, and only a little less strong, than the divide of four centuries ago."

Aspects of the South Pembrokeshire dialect were noted from a talk at the British Library given by Marloes inhabitants in 1976; their dialect showed distinctive similarities to the English spoken in the West Country of England, as opposed to the English spoken in south east Wales.

Prior to the 1997 Welsh devolution referendum, which resulted in the creation of the National Assembly for Wales (now the Senedd), it was reported that Pembrokeshire's vote could be key.

The differences in the proportion of Welsh speakers persist, illustrated by the map derived from the 2011 census, and the name has persisted into the 21st century; in 2015 Tenby was quoted as being "traditionally the heart of Little England beyond Wales".

In 2022, the ice cream maker Upton Farm, based at Pembroke Dock, was criticised for using the phrase "Made for you in little England beyond Wales" in their packaging. The company agreed to remove the reference in future, and replace it "with messaging that more clearly celebrates our Welshness".

== Overview ==
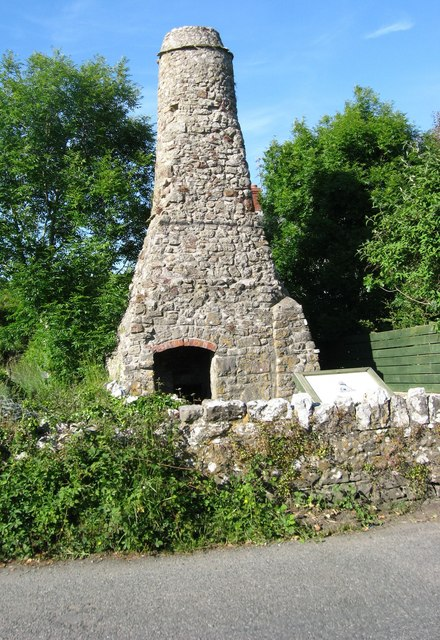
Carew Chimney (Flemish chimney)

As for placenames, the greatest concentration of Anglo-Saxon names is in the former hundred of Roose, which had pre-Norman origins, while there are considerable numbers of Welsh placenames in the rest of Little England, although these areas were certainly English-speaking. Flemish names, Fenton noted, are rarely found in early documents, supporting Owen's statement:

In the swaynes and laborers of the countrey you may often trace a Flemish origin...

but that:

...from the first introduction of foreigners into this country, the greater proportion were Saxon or English, whom the first Norman kings were as desirous of getting rid of as they afterwards were of the Flemish; and to that may be ascribed the predominancy of the English language.

Fenton adds:

No wonder then that such part of this county as was so colonized, and continued to inherit prejudices (not yet fairly eradicated) to keep them a separate people, should be called Little England beyond Wales, and in the eye of the law considered as part of England; for at a time when the maxim was allowed that "Breve domini regis non currit in Walliam"; yet by many records still extant, it is clear that the king's writs did run into what Camden calls "Anglia transwallina", including the jurisdiction of the earldom of Pembroke, which extended only to those parts of it where the English tongue was spoken.

On the Gower Peninsula, the sharp distinction between the English- and Welsh-speaking populations has been referred to as the "Englishry" and the "Welshry". As mentioned by Owen, the cultural differences between Little England and the "Welshry" extend beyond language. Manorial villages are more common in Little England, particularly on the banks of the Daugleddau estuary, while the north has characteristically Welsh scattered settlements. Forms of agriculture are also distinct.

On the other hand, Little England and the Welshry have many similarities. Typical Welsh surnames of patronymic origin (e.g. Edwards, Richards, Phillips etc.) were almost universal in the Welshry in Owen's time, but they also accounted for 40 per cent of names in Little England. According to John, the majority of English-speaking Little England natives today regard themselves as Welsh, as did Gerald, who was born on the south coast at Manorbier in 1146.

Most recently, David Austin labels "Little England" a myth and questions the process by which the language came about, attributing it to a combination of land manipulation and Tudor "aspirant gentry".

== Genetic studies ==
Welsh academic Morgan Watkin claimed that levels of type A blood in South Pembrokeshire were 5–10 per cent higher than in surrounding areas. Watkin suggested that this was due to Viking settlement in the area, rather than the forcible transfer of a colony of Flemish refugees to the area, by King Henry I, in the early 12th century. However, the geneticist Brian Sykes later commented that – while the levels of blood group A in the Low Countries were not particularly high – it was not possible to tell whether the high levels in "Little England" were caused "by rampaging Vikings or by a few cartloads of Belgians". Sykes also commented that, based on the findings of his Oxford Genetic Atlas Project, there was a lack of patrilineal Y-chromosomes from the "Sigurd" clan (haplogroup R1a) in South Wales in general, which was strong evidence against Viking settlement, and meant that Watkin's theory regarding the high frequency of type A blood in "Little England" was wrong.

A 2003 Y-chromosome study in Haverfordwest revealed an Anglo-Celtic population similar to populations in South West England.

Researchers at the Wellcome Trust Centre for Human Genetics reported in 2015 "unexpectedly stark differences between inhabitants in the north and south of the Welsh county of Pembrokeshire" in DNA signatures.

== See also ==
- Landsker Borderlands Trail – a waymarked long-distance footpath through this region.
- Cultural relationship between the Welsh and the English
