= Celtic inscribed stone =

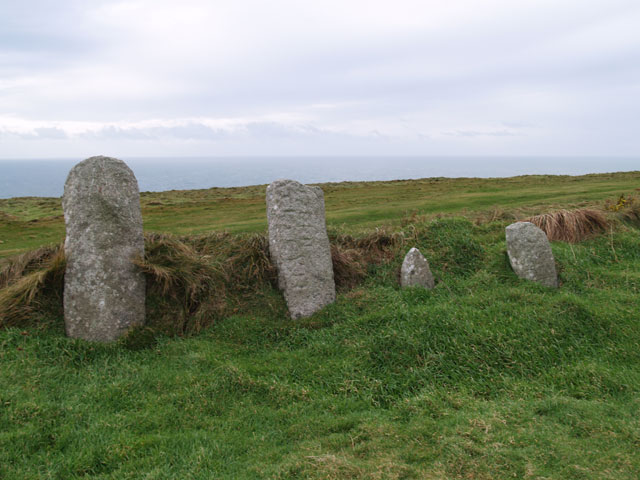
Four Celtic inscribed stones from Beacon Hill cemetery on Lundy

Celtic inscribed stones are stone monuments dating from 400 to 1000 AD which have inscriptions in Celtic or Latin text. These can be written in Ogham or Roman letters. Some stones have both Ogham and Roman inscriptions. The stones are found in Ireland, Scotland, Wales, Brittany, the Isle of Man, and parts of western England (mainly Cornwall, Devon, and Lundy). Most seem to be grave-markers or memorials to a dead individual.

The Celtic Inscribed Stones Project database records over 1,200 such inscriptions, excluding Runic ones. It maintains an online database of them.

They relate to other standing stones with images, such as the Pictish stones of Scotland, or abstract decoration, such as the much earlier Irish Turoe Stone and Castlestrange Stone.

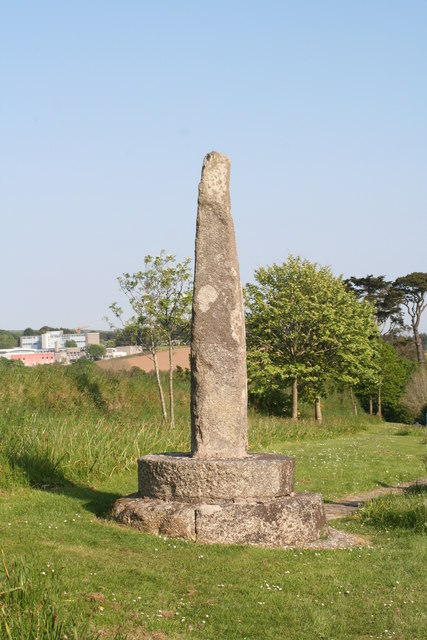
The Tristan Stone in 2008

== Cornwall ==
=== East Cornwall ===
The Tristan Stone, perhaps of c. 550, is near Fowey, having been moved from just above the harbour at Polkerris. It has a Tau cross on one face, and on another the Latin inscription:

DRVSTANVS HIC IACIT
CVNOMORI FILIVS
[Drustanus lies here, son of Cunomorus]

Not far from Worthyvale in the parish of Minster is an inscribed stone (Latini [h]ic iacit filius Macari = Latin son of Macarus lies here). This stone is popularly known as King Arthur's Grave due to the erroneous identification of Slaughter Bridge with the site of Camlann.

=== West Cornwall ===
The Mên Scryfa is also inscribed in Latin, perhaps adding to a much earlier megalith.

The Selus Stone (thought to date from the late 5th or early 6th-centuries); it bears the Latin inscription Selus Ic Iacet (Selus lies here). This is thought to refer to Salomon of Cornwall, otherwise known as Saint Selevan. It is preserved at St Just in Penwith Parish Church.

In the south aisle of Cuby church is an inscribed stone of the 6th or 7th century (Nonnita Ercilini Rigati [...]tris Fili Ercilini).

The churchyard of St Clement contains an inscribed stone cross: the first word of the inscription is perhaps isnioc (later opinion believes ignioc). The inscription is Ignioc Vitali fili Torrici (i.e. Ignioc son of Vitalus son of Torricus) and the dating is 5th to 7th century. Another inscription is in Ogham, perhaps partly in Irish. The inscriptions are both older than the carving of the upper part into a cross.

An inscribed stone, dated from the sixth to eighth centuries, was found imbedded in the walls of the fifteenth-century Cubert parish church. It bears the name of "Cenet[o]cus, son of Tege[r]nomalus".

=== Gallery ===
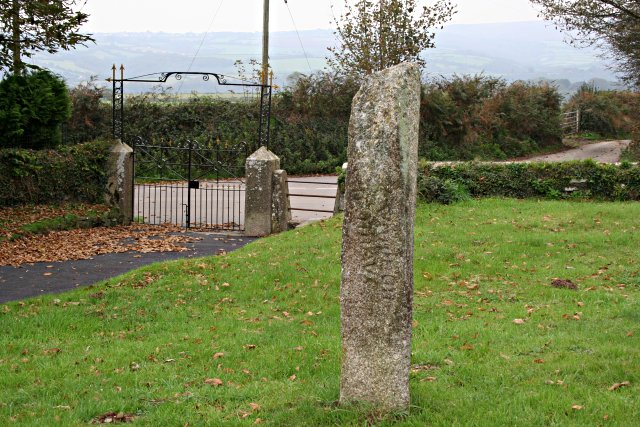
The inscribed stone at South Hill

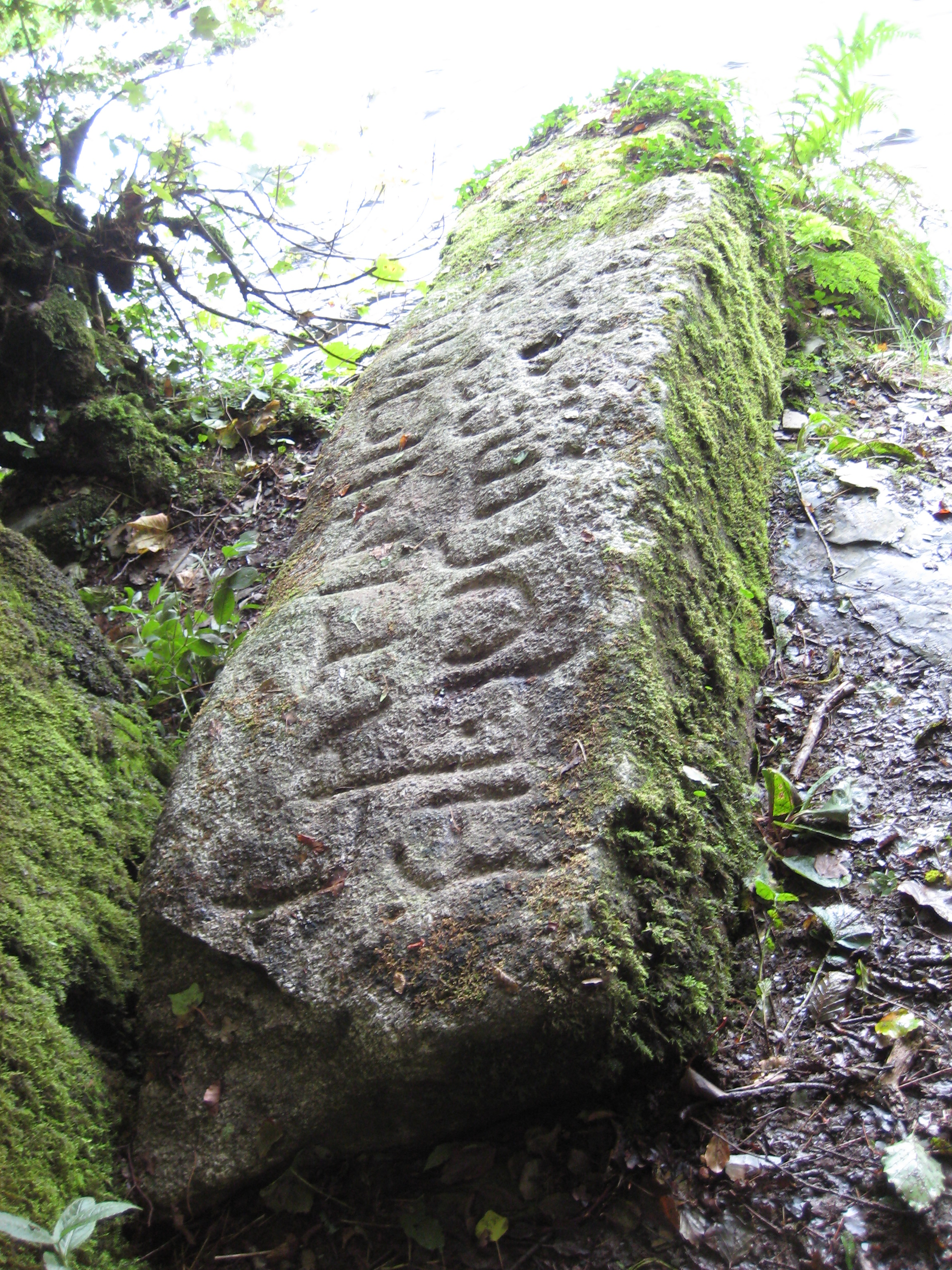
The inscribed stone near Worthyvale

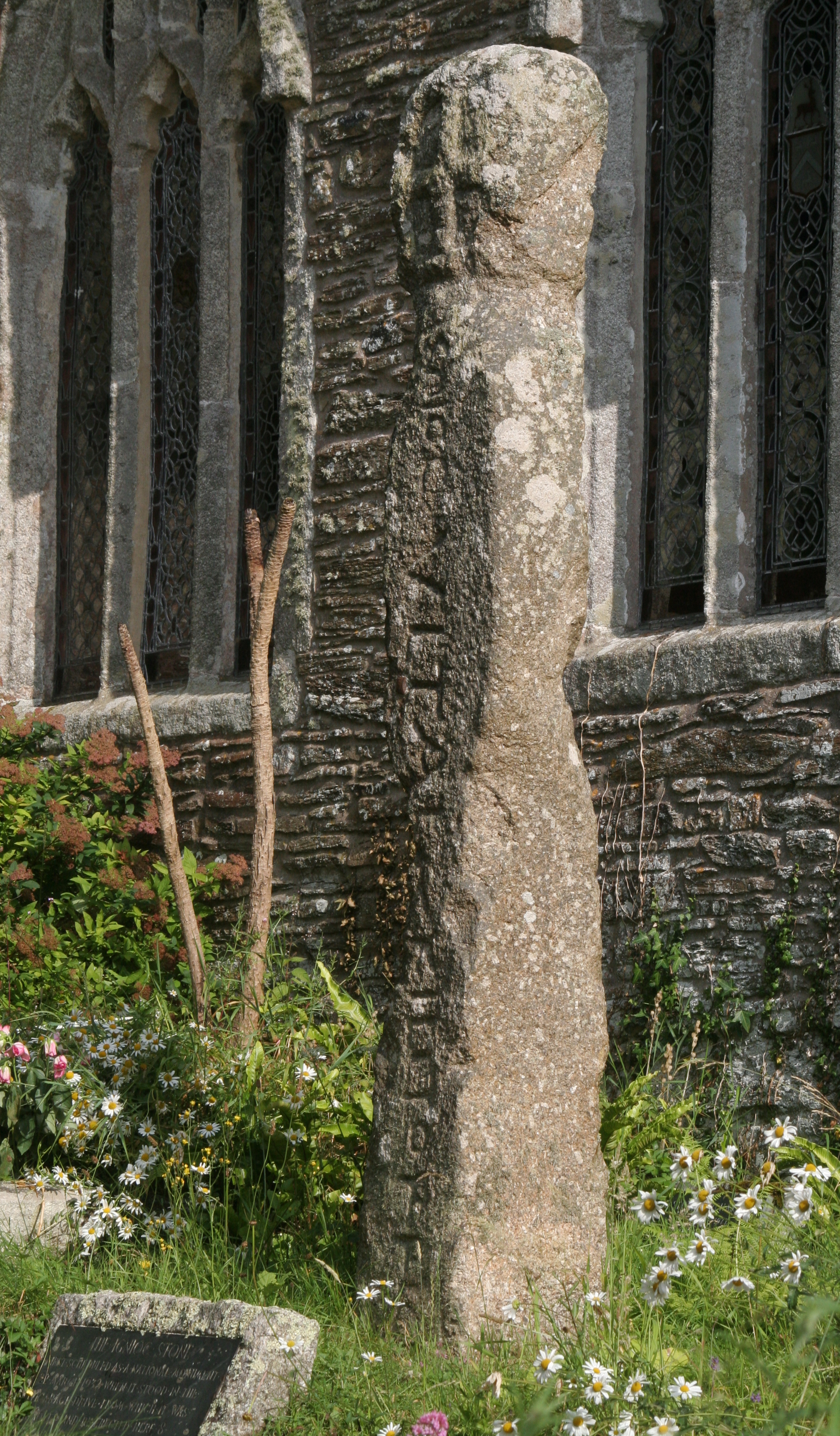
The inscribed cross at St Clement (Ignioc stone)

== Wales ==
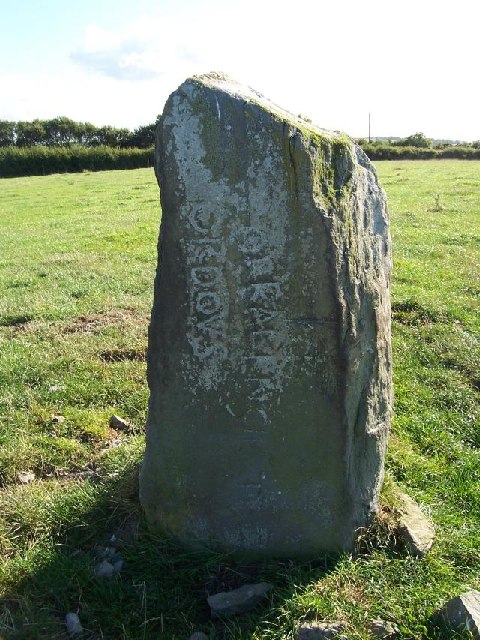
The Corbalengi Stone

Standing in a field between Penbryn and Tresaith (grid reference SN28905137) in Ceredigion is the 6th century Corbalengi Stone. This 1.4 metre high monolith is believed to date from the post-Roman period and carries the inscription "CORBALENGI IACIT ORDOVS". The stone was first noted by Edward Lhywd in 1695 who described it as being in a field near the church. It was originally associated with a cairn of smaller stones beneath which was discovered an urn of ashes and some Roman coins. The final word 'Ordovs' of the inscription (after IACIT, "lies") is believed to refer to the Ordovices tribe of North Wales, with the suggestion that the stone was carved by local tribes in honour of a member of the Ordovices who had settled in the area.

Other readings and interpretations are: "Cor Balenci jacit Ordous", interpreted as: "The Heart of Balengus the Ordovician lies here", and "CORBALENGI LACIT ORDOVS" ("Lacit" = "thrashed", rather than "Iacit" = lies), in which case it would refer to a tribal battle between the Ordovices and the "Corbalengi". Although the Ordovices are reasonably well known, no other record of a Corbalengi tribe is known.
