= Roose Hundred =

Former Hundred of Pembrokeshire, Wales

Coordinates: 51.813°N 4.655°W

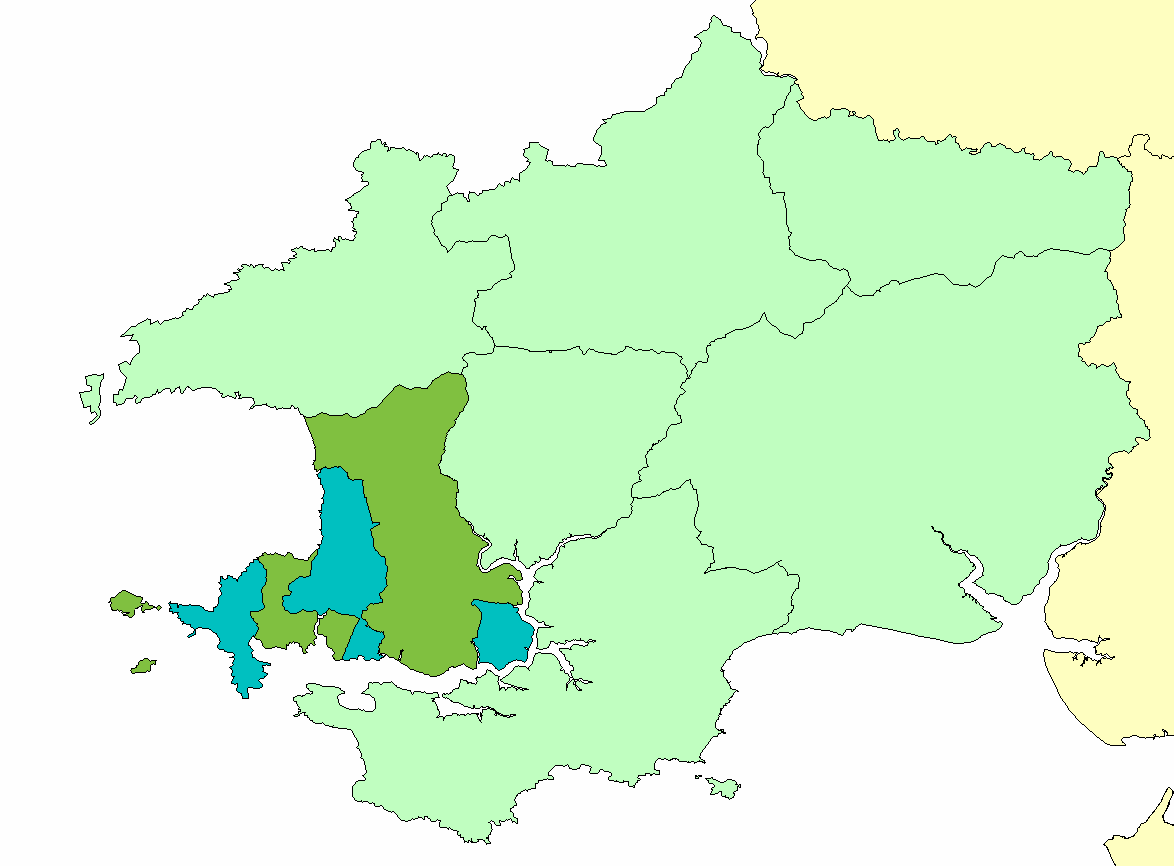
The hundred and cantref of Roose (Rhos) as part of ancient Dyfed. The Lordship of Haverfordwest is shown in green, and the Lordship of Walwyn's Castle in blue

The Hundred of Roose (sometimes called Rowse) was a hundred in Pembrokeshire, Wales. It has its origins in the pre-Norman cantref of Rhos and was formalised as a hundred by the Laws in Wales Acts 1535–1542. Its area was about 102 square miles (260 km^{2}). The area became an English "plantation" in the 12th century, part of the English-speaking Little England beyond Wales.

== Etymology ==
The name Roose is derived from the earlier Welsh name Rhos, describing its position nearly surrounded by water. It is bounded to the east by the tidal Western Cleddau, south by Milford Haven and west by St. Brides Bay. Rhos locally means (among other things) "promontory". The English form is a corruption of the Welsh. The pre-Norman Conquest Cantref of Rhos was a Medieval administrative division, which became the Hundred of Roose and was formalised by the Laws in Wales Acts 1535–1542.

== History ==
The pre-Norman history of the cantref is uncertain, as is the site of its civil headquarters. It had been popularly assumed that the chief town of Haverfordwest does not pre-date the Norman conquest. However archaeological discoveries in Pembrokeshire as early as the 1920s by Sir Mortimer Wheeler at Wolfscastle earlier Iron Age and Roman coinage and artefact discoveries, and recent excavations by the Dyfed Archaeological Trust under the direction of Heather James at Carmarthen (Maridunum) in the 1980s point convincingly to Roman penetration to the westernmost parts of Wales. A Roman road running west of Carmarthen has been identified with the possibility of Roman Fortlets at Whitland and Haverfordwest. The strategic position of Haverfordwest with its defensive bluff overlooking the lowest fordable point on the Western Cleddau accessible to sea traffic suggest a Roman origin probably modest in scale for the town from about 96 AD. The ecclesiastical centre (perhaps the seat of a bishop in the Age of the Saints) was probably one of the several churches of the local St. Ismael, most probably St. Ishmael's.

The hundred, with its capital at Haverfordwest was the original centre of the Norman/English "plantation" in the 12th century, and it has been essentially English-speaking since then, forming the core of Little England beyond Wales.

The cantref was said in the post-Norman period to be divided into two or perhaps three commotes. The Red Book of Hergest mentions Hwlffordd (Haverfordwest) commote and Castell Gwalchmei (Walwyn's Castle) commote. The former is an English name, and the "commotes" correspond to the Norman lordships. The northern part of Hwlffordd commote was sometimes distinguished as Roch commote (a French name). None of these is likely to be a real native Welsh subdivision, and the small Cantref of Rhos was probably not actually divided into commotes. The fragmentary Norman lordships are shown in the map.

== See also ==
- Rhos (North Wales)
