= Llandissilio =

Village and parish in Pembrokeshire, Wales

Llandissilio: Welsh: Llandysilio
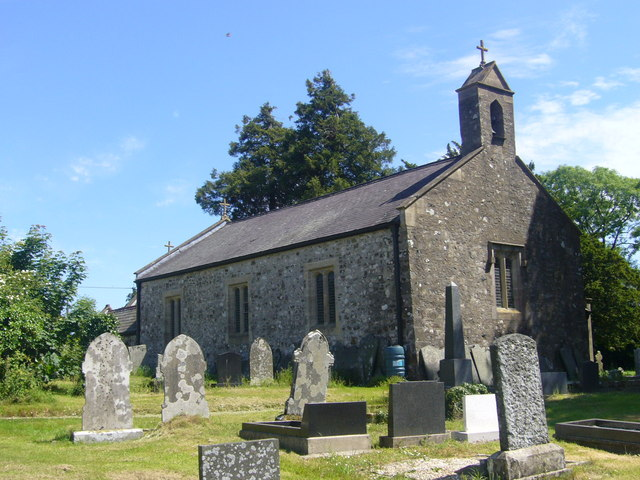
- St Tysilio parish church

- Location within Pembrokeshire
- Community: Llandissilio West
- Principal area: Pembrokeshire
- Country: Wales
- Sovereign state: United Kingdom
- Post town: Clunderwen
- Postcode district: SA66
- Dialling code: 01437
- Police: Dyfed-Powys
- Fire: Mid and West Wales
- Ambulance: Welsh
- UK Parliament: Preseli Pembrokeshire
- Senedd Cymru – Welsh Parliament: Ceredigion Penfro
- List of places UK Wales Pembrokeshire 51.86282°N 4.732757°W Map of the Llandissilio West community

Llandissilio (Welsh: Llandysilio) is a village and parish in the community of Llandissilio West in east Pembrokeshire, Wales on the A478 road between Efailwen to the north and Clunderwen to the south. A largely ribbon development along the main road, the village is surrounded by farmland.

== Name ==
The village takes its name from Tysilio, a 7th-century Welsh saint to whom the parish church is dedicated.

== History ==
Ancient remains indicate that the area that is now the village of Llandissilio has been occupied for many centuries. For part of its history the parish of Llandissilio was in Carmarthenshire.

The parish was originally part of the Hundred of Derllys in Carmarthenshire.

A Visitation of the Archdeaconry of Carmarthen in 1710 found that of about 120 families in the parish, 40 attended church at Easter, 20 at Whitsuntide and 20 at Christmas and noted "the Minister suffers in his reputation for being addicted to drinking and swearing" and "the roof of the north side of the Chancell lies open to the wind & weather."

The population of the parish of Llandissilio West in 1801 was 281. By 1981 the population had grown to 458. In 1891, 97% were Welsh-speaking, and 75% spoke only Welsh; 10 years later those speaking only Welsh had fallen to 29%. By 1981, 70% still spoke Welsh, but only 1% were not English-speaking.

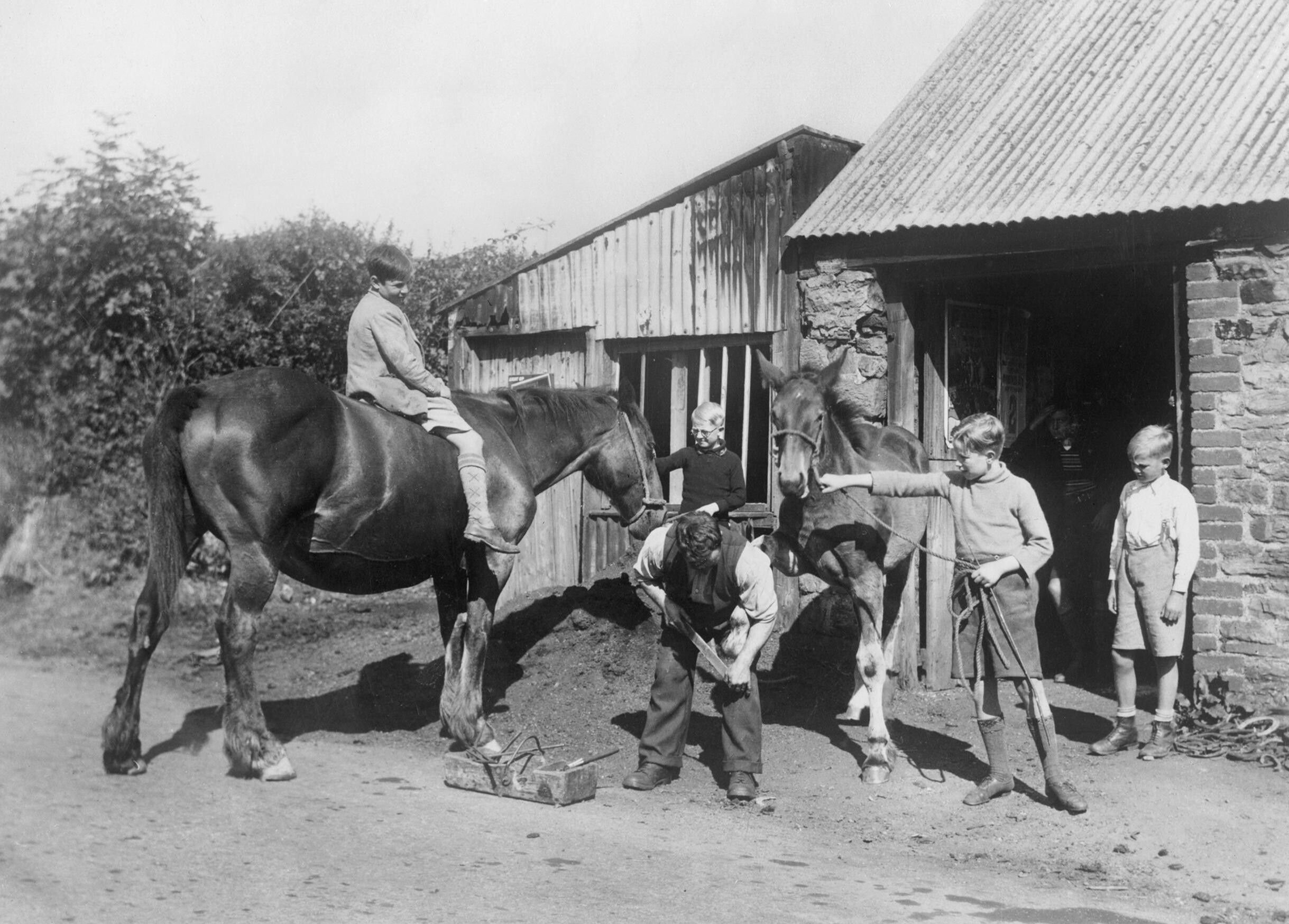
Evacuees, 1940

In 1831 nearly half of men over 20 years were agricultural labourers, and nearly a quarter were farmers employing them. The rest of the male population was engaged in retail or handicrafts.

Slate quarrying and corn milling were carried out in the 19th century.

Boys from Creek Road LCC School, Greenwich, London, were evacuated to Llandissilio during World War 2 (pictured). The War Memorial records the names of ten men of the parish who were killed in World War 1 and World War 2, and the memorial was Grade II listed in 2004.

== Environment ==
Llandissilio is situated on the Landsker Borderlands Trail, a circular waymarked long-distance footpath running through Pembrokeshire and Carmarthenshire. The village is surrounded by farmland with deciduous trees. Near the south of the village is the source of the River Conyn which then flows south-west to meet the Eastern Cleddau.

== Worship ==
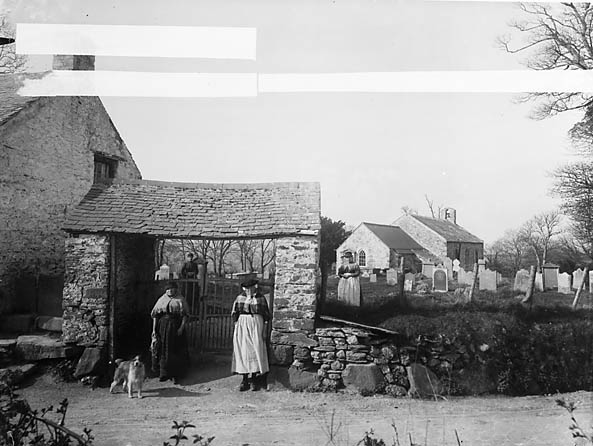
Parish church ca 1885

St Tysilio Parish Church is in the Diocese of St David's. The church was Grade II listed in 1971 under the auspices of Cadw; it has mediaeval origins, and has been restored since.

Blaenconin Baptist Chapel is on the outskirts of the village. Waldo Williams is buried there.

A drawing of Blaenconin chapel by the artist John Piper illustrates John Betjeman's collection of essays on architecture, First and Last Loves (2012). John Piper's photograph of the chapel is held in the Tate collection.

== Education ==
Brynconin Community School (Welsh: Ysgol Brynconin) educates children from 3 to 11 years. Teaching is in English and Welsh languages, and (in 2011) 40% of pupils spoke Welsh at home.

== Amenities ==
The village has a pub (The Angel), hotel, holiday park and retail premises.

== Governance ==
The community of Llandissilio West, in which the village lies, is part of Maenclochog electoral division of Pembrokeshire County Council which elects one county councillor. The community of Llandissilio East is in Carmarthenshire.
