= Landsker Line =

Demarcation in Wales

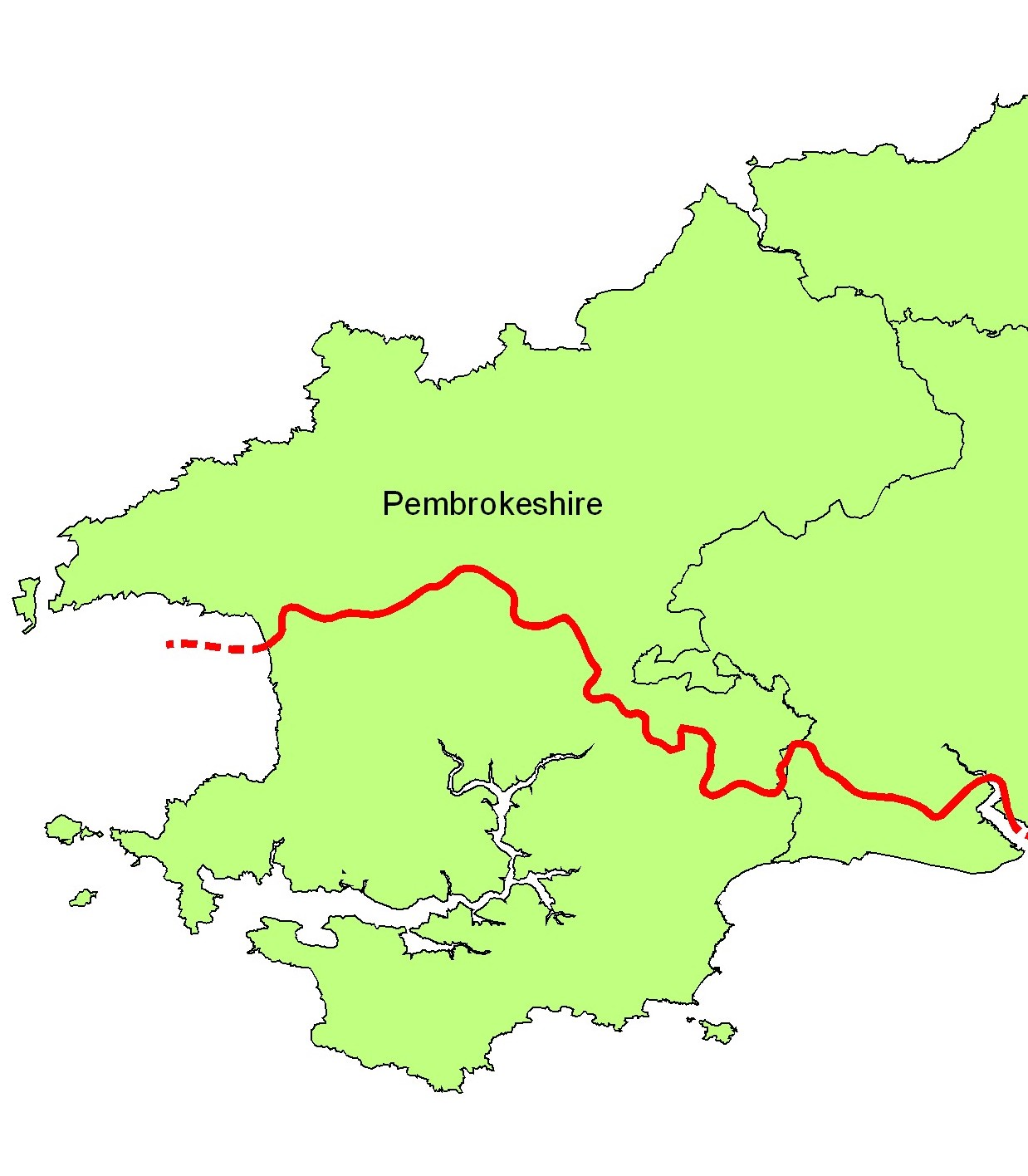
Landsker Line envisaged in 1901

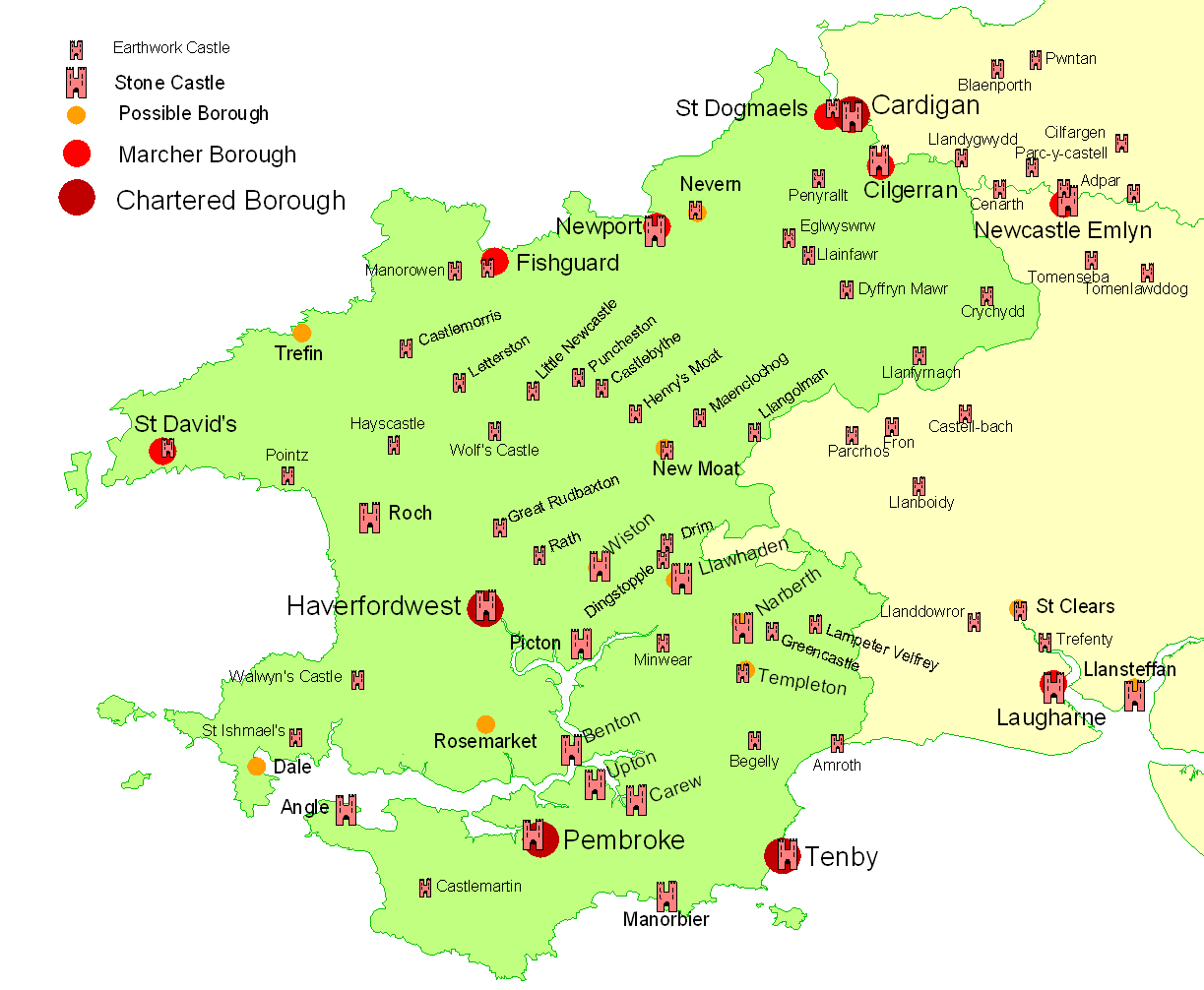
Norman castles and boroughs in southwest Wales

The Landsker Line (Welsh: Ffin ieithyddol Sir Benfro) is a term used for the language border in Wales between the largely Welsh-speaking and largely English-speaking areas in Pembrokeshire and Carmarthenshire. The English-speaking areas, south of the Landsker line and sometimes known as Little England beyond Wales, are notable for having been English linguistically for many centuries despite being far from the England–Wales border.

== History ==
During the 11th and 12th centuries both invaders and defenders built more than fifty castles during a complex period of conflict, effectively to consolidate the line. The southernmost was Laugharne; others included Wiston, Camrose, Narberth, and Roch. These are often referred to as "frontier castles" but they were in fact set back a considerable distance from the frontier itself. In the heart of the Norman-dominated area, the two great fortresses were at Pembroke and Haverfordwest. There were other fortresses within the colonised area as well, including Manorbier, Carew and Tenby.

The Landsker has changed position many times, first moving north into the foothills of Mynydd Preseli during the military campaigns of the Early Middle Ages, and then moving southwards again in more peaceful times, as the English colonists found that farming and feudalism were difficult to maintain on cold acid soils and exposed hillsides.

Proportion of Welsh speakers (2011 census)

When historians began to gain interest in the linguistic divide, they used the term "landsker", or "lansker", for example by Richard Fenton in 1810, though the term had been used much earlier by antiquarian George Owen of Henllys in 1603. It remains in common use. Local people are very aware of the term, and recognise that the language divide stretching from St Bride's Bay to Carmarthen Bay remains very distinct.

== Language and genetic differences ==
The differences in the proportion of Welsh speakers persists in the 21st century and is illustrated by the map derived from the 2011 census.

Researchers at the Wellcome Trust Centre for Human Genetics reported in 2015 "unexpectedly stark differences between inhabitants in the north and south of the Welsh county of Pembrokeshire" in DNA signatures.

== In-depth description ==
The term Landsker is a word of Anglo-Saxon origin used in southwest England and along the anglicised South Wales coast. It signifies a permanent, visible boundary between two tracts of land, and may be a natural feature (e.g. a river) or an artificial feature (e.g. a hedge or a line of marker stones). In Wales, its official use became obsolete at the end of the eighteenth century.

In 1939, the term was first applied to the linguistic frontier in southwest Wales. The linguistic boundary, in general, is neither visible nor permanent. Commentators have taken up the use of the word in this context in the last 50 years, so that in the 21st century it is usually understood to mean the language boundary.

The language boundary is an example of a cultural frontier that has persisted, without legal status, for ten centuries or more. The boundary (with Welsh to the north and east, and English to the south and west) starts on St Bride’s Bay and follows a serpentine course eastwards until it meets the River Taf just north of Laugharne in Carmarthenshire. Traces of a boundary also persist across the Llansteffan peninsula and the country near Kidwelly, and it reappears strongly in the boundary between English and Welsh Gower. The area to the south of the line was referred to in the 16th century as Anglia Transwalliana (Little England beyond Wales).

In 1603, George Owen provided a snapshot description of the language boundary and 'Little England beyond Wales', and provided an antiquarian account of the settlement of English speakers in southwest Wales. This provides the “traditional” view: that the area was cleared of native Welsh by the Norman invaders in the early 12th century, and was planted with Flemings from elsewhere in England. However, Owen pointed out that there was no trace of Flemish custom or language in his time. In fact, traditional Pembrokeshire English is lexically related to the Early English of southwest England, and in all probability the anglicisation of the Welsh coast paralleled the anglicisation of Devon and Cornwall, perhaps concurrently. A 2003 DNA study showed that people in 'Little England' are genetically indistinguishable from the people of southern England.

The frontier was not solely linguistic: there were also differences in customs (notably of inheritance) and in architecture. Owen characterised the cultural frontier in 1602 as both sharp and stable, and subsequent observers (with less local knowledge than Owen) have reiterated his description, and suggested that the line remained close to that described by Owen. The first objective, statistically based description of the frontier was made in the 1960s, and showed a line similar to that described by Owen, although in some places it had moved north, while in others it had moved south. People in the frontier zone did not recognise the term “Landsker”, but were well aware of the location of the boundary. Rather than a sharp line of demarcation, the boundary consists of a corridor of mixed language, typically 2 to 3 miles (3–5 km) wide, in which the direction of language trend varies according to the migration characteristics of the inhabitants. The frontier zone has probably always had these characteristics.

As mentioned above, the frontier moved between 1600 and today. Historic data on personal names also show that it also moved between 1200 and 1600. Attempts to set up a number of Norman/English “planned villages” (e.g. Letterston and New Moat) were made north of the current frontier in the mediæval period. These subsequently failed, and were re-occupied by Welsh speakers in the post Black Death period. In more modern times, the enclosure of commons allowed a substantial southward spread of Welsh speakers, particularly in Carmarthenshire. These are quite rare examples of Welsh-speaking areas expanding at the expense of English-speaking areas; in the central part of Pembrokeshire the shift of the Landsker southwards between 1600 and 1900 was in excess of 6 miles (10 km).

Southwest Wales is very rich in Norman Castles. Some are deep within the Welsh zone (e.g. Newport, Cardigan, Cilgerran, Newcastle Emlyn, Carmarthen), and some are deep in Little England (e.g. Pembroke, Carew, Manorbier, Haverfordwest, Tenby). A number lie close to the language boundary (e.g. Roch, Wiston, Llawhaden, Narberth, Laugharne) and are sometimes referred to as “frontier castles”, but the whole of Dyfed (the territory south of the River Teifi and west of the Towy and Gwili) was in the hands of Norman marcher lords.

The line is noted for being sharp, and for having moved only slightly over the past several centuries. A visible boundary which represents the Landsker line is Brandy Brook which runs through Newgale, remarked upon by Richard Fenton in his Historical Tour of 1810. The first beach north after the brook has the Welsh name Pen-y-Cwm.

== Sources ==
- Fenton, Richard (1811). A historical tour through Pembrokeshire. Longman, Hurst, Rees, Orme & co.
