= Llawhaden Castle =

Ruined castle in Pembrokeshire, Wales

Coordinates: 51.822°N 4.798°W

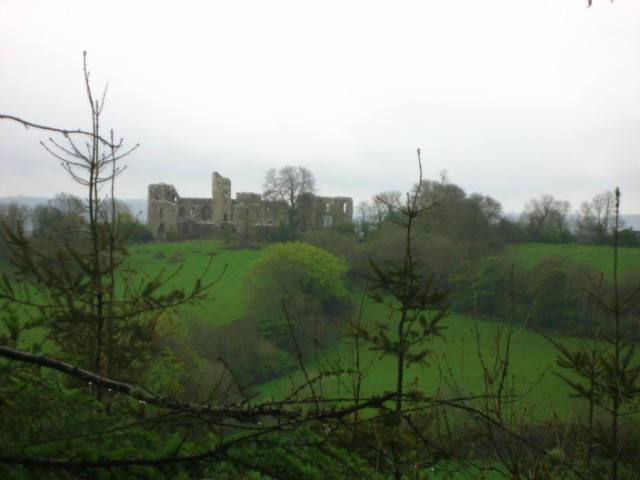
Llawhaden Castle from Drim Wood

Llawhaden Castle (Welsh: Castell Llanhuadain) (grid reference SN 073175) is a ruined castle in Llawhaden, Pembrokeshire, Wales, 10 miles (16 km) east of Haverfordwest. A motte-and-bailey castle is thought to have previously occupied the site and the present structure was built by the bishops of the Diocese of St David in the 13th century. The castle was abandoned in the 16th century and some of the stone was removed for local building projects. The site is privately owned by the Lord of the Manor of Llawhaden and managed by Cadw.

== Description ==
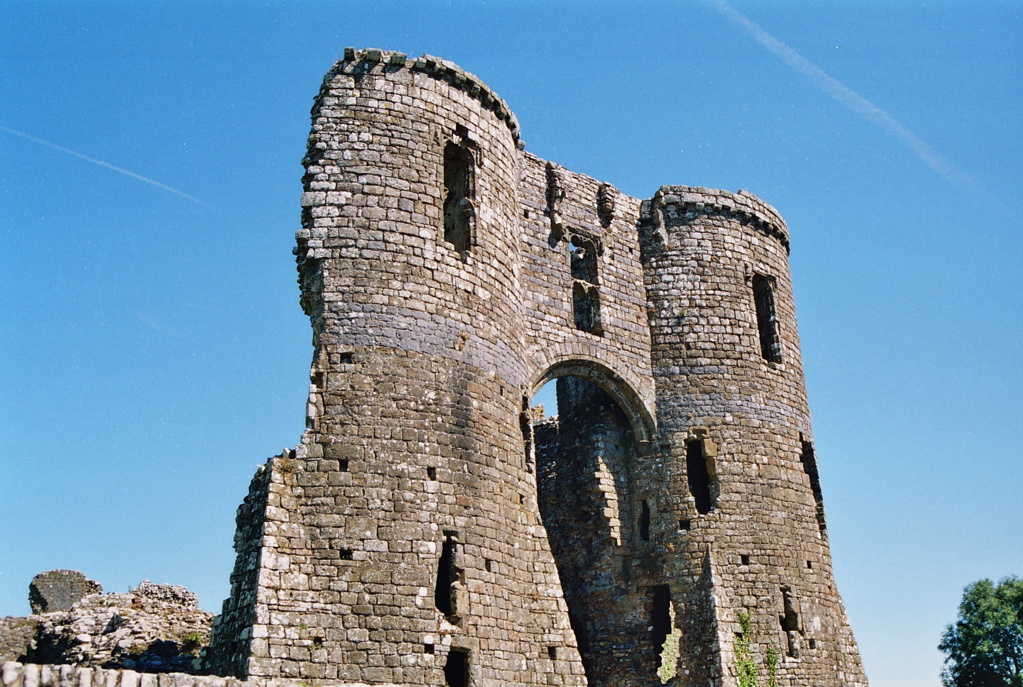
Llawhaden Castle Gatehouse today

The ruins of Llawhaden Castle stands on a hill overlooking the River Cleddau, The remaining ruins date from the early 13th century. It is surrounded by a ditch, which was designed to be only crossable by a drawbridge. The castle is pentagonal in shape and while the north-western and western sides of the castle are no longer present, the other three sides remain. The gatehouse is located on the southern side, which is formed of two drum towers and a gateway. This was also where the drawbridge would have been located to allow entrance to the interior of the castle. The ruins are managed by Cadw, and are open to the public.

== History ==
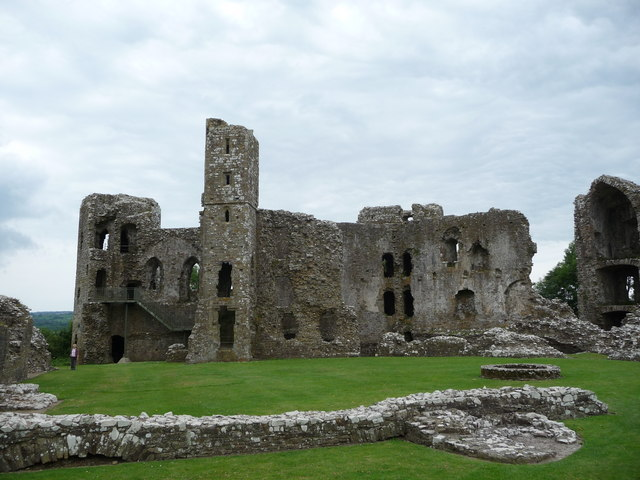
Llawhaden Castle ruins

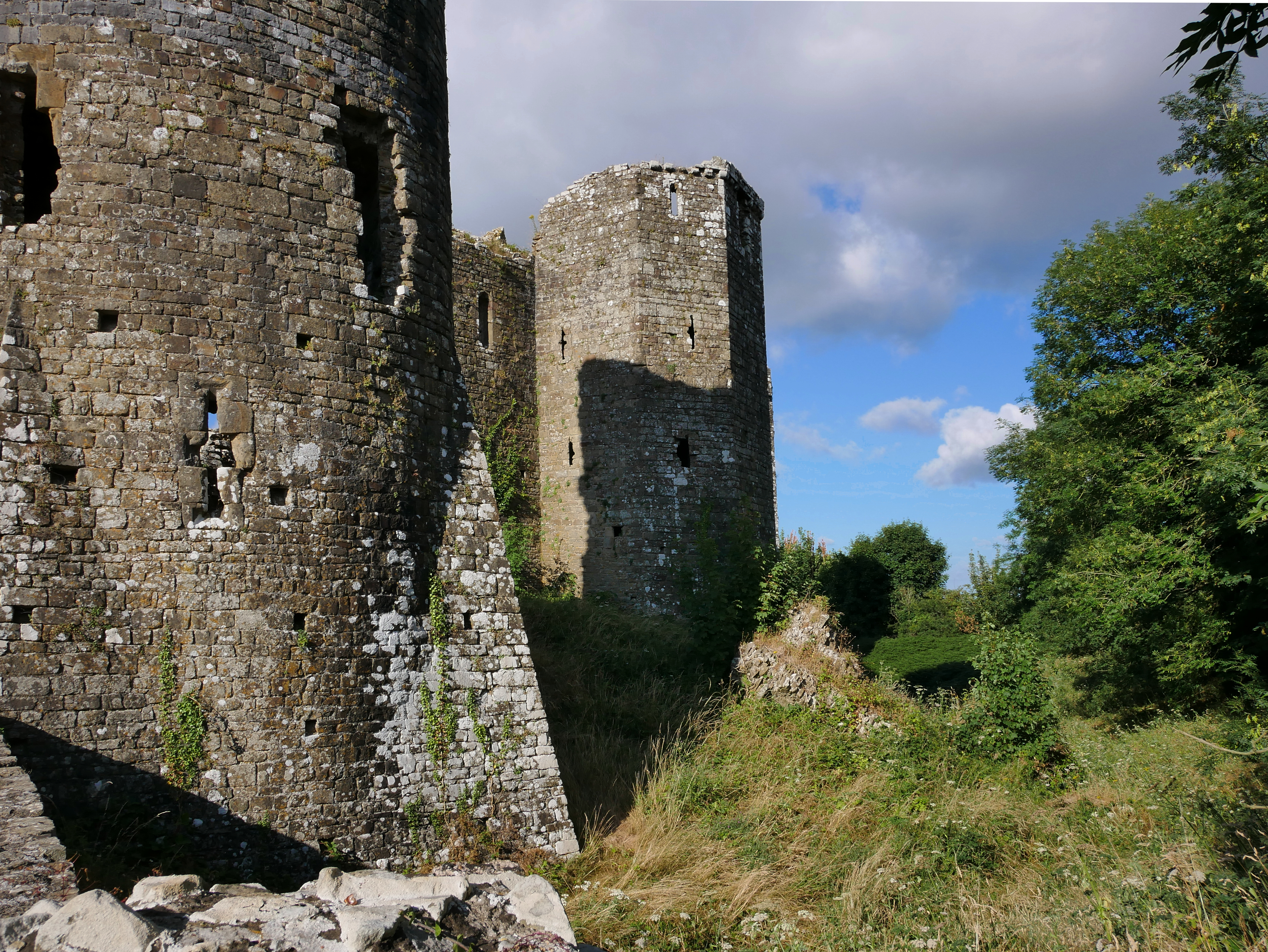
Llawhaden Castle

Llawhaden and its hinterland were lands owned by the Bishopric of the Diocese of St David, since at least the later years of the realm of Deheubarth. Following the Norman conquest of Deheubarth, these lands (of which Llawhaden and its hinterland were a detached part) became the Marcher Lordship of Dewisland, ruled by the Bishops; it was the only ecclesiastically-ruled Marcher Lordship. Marcher Lords had such great authority that they were almost sovereign.

The first Norman Bishop, Bernard, constructed a castle on the site in the year that he was appointed - 1115. Only a moat and an earth bank from this period survive, although it is thought to have been a motte-and-bailey castle. Around 1192, the castle was taken by Lord Rhys, along with Swansea Castle and Wiston Castle. The stone-built building came later; the vast majority of the ruins seen today date from the construction commissioned by Bishop Adam de Houghton between 1362 and 1389. This was much grander, with two suites of residences situated on the first floor. The gatehouse shown in the picture was probably added at a later date. Additions continued to be made to the castle into the early years of the reign of Henry VIII of England.

The building fell into decline under the control of Bishop William Barlow, the first Bishop appointed after Henry's Laws in Wales Acts had abolished Marcher Lordships. Barlow was an ardent Church Reformist, whose appointment had been encouraged by Thomas Cranmer, and who was significantly unenamoured with St. Davids and its traditions. Barlow sold the lead from the castle roof, supposedly to pay for the dowry of one of his daughters, resulting in damage to the rest of the building from which it never recovered. After the dissolution of the monasteries (which met no resistance from Protestant reformists like Barlow), the castle was completely abandoned, falling into disrepair; it was subsequently quarried for building stone.

In 1930, George Lansbury, then First Commissioner of Works in the Parliament of the United Kingdom, organised a party of 1,300 previously unemployed men for six months to do renovation work on several castles. Llawhaden Castle was among those worked on, with several tasks undertaken including digging out moats and ditches, as well as removing ivy and undergrowth.
