= Llawhaden =

Village, parish and community in Pembrokeshire, Wales

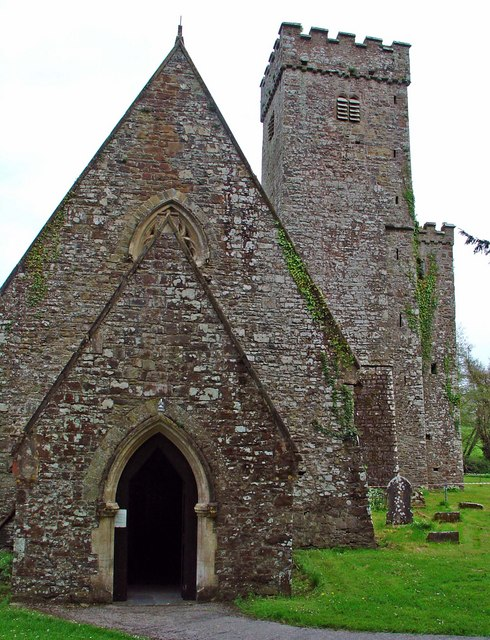
- St Aidan's church

- Location within Pembrokeshire
- Population: 688 (2011)
- OS grid reference: SN072175
- Community: Llawhaden
- Principal area: Pembrokeshire
- Country: Wales
- Sovereign state: United Kingdom
- Post town: Narberth
- Postcode district: SA67 8
- Dialling code: 01437
- Police: Dyfed-Powys
- Fire: Mid and West Wales
- Ambulance: Welsh
- UK Parliament: Mid and South Pembrokeshire
- Senedd Cymru – Welsh Parliament: Ceredigion Penfro
- List of places UK Wales Pembrokeshire 51.82°N 4.798°W Map of the community

Llawhaden (Welsh: Llanhuadain) is a village, parish and community in mid-Pembrokeshire, West Wales, historically in the Hundred of Dungleddy (Welsh: Daugleddyf). The community of Llawhaden includes the parish of Robeston Wathen, part of Narberth and the hamlet of Gelli, and had a population of 634 in 2001, increasing to 688 at the 2011 Census.

== Name ==
The name Llawhaden is an anglicised version of the Welsh form Llanhuadain, and probably means "(monastic) enclosure of St Aidan".

== Description ==
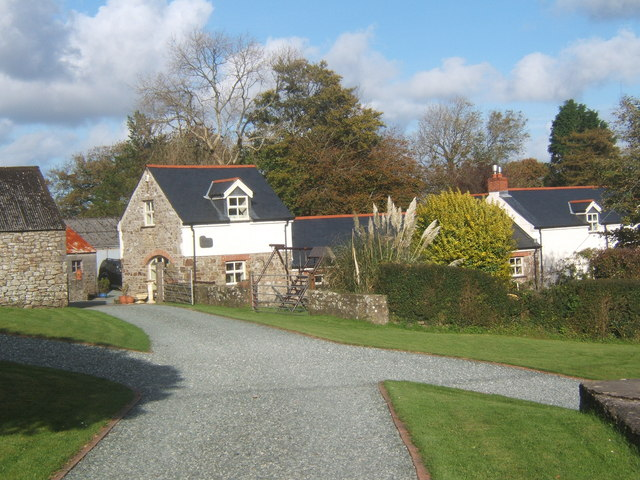
Llawhaden village

The village is in the form of a large medieval planned settlement, although most of the land lots laid out along the main street are now vacant. At the end of the main street, spectacularly overlooking the Cleddau valley, is a substantial castle, Llawhaden Castle. The parish church of St Aidan (of Ferns, a disciple of Saint David) is situated below the village beside the river, at 51.8226°N 4.7944°W.

== History ==
Llawhaden and its larger hinterland (between the Syfynwy/Deepford Brook and Eastern Cleddau) was the property of the Bishops of St Davids in the later years of Deheubarth's existence. The Norman Conquest of Deheubarth left the rights of the Bishops largely unchallenged, creating an effectively independent state under the Bishop's control (since Deheubarth no longer existed around it). In 1115, after Bishop Bernard accepted the king's suzerainty over the land, King Henry I issued a charter formally acknowledging the lands of St. David's as a Marcher Lordship — Dewisland — of which the area around Llawhaden formed an exclave.

As Marcher Lords, the Bishops of St Davids had judicial powers over all offences (except high treason), and could levy tax, issue charters, raise armies, and start wars. Bernard built a castle at Llawhaden to protect the Llawhaden portion of his land, and the village grew up around it. As the chief seat of this exclave of Dewisland, he granted the settlement at Llawhaden the status of a burgh. As the lands north of the Preseli Hills were less fertile, and hence less hospitable, than those to the south, successive bishops came to base their administration at Llawhaden; by the 13th century the exchequer, chancery and court of Dewisland had moved here. Though part of Dewisland, and ruled by the same person (the Bishop of St. Davids), as it was an exclave it was sometimes called the Lordship of Llawhaden, as if it were a distinct Marcher Lordship.

King Henry VIII's 1535 Laws in Wales Acts abolished the powers of Marcher Lordships; Dewisland (including Llawhaden) was merged by the Act with the adjacent Lordship of Pembroke, to form Pembrokeshire. The Llawhaden exclave became a mere barony, and Llawhaden burgh ceased to have any administrative importance. George Owen, in 1603, described Llawhaden as one of nine Pembrokeshire "boroughs in decay". (Here, borough means burgh; the term borough only took its modern meaning (Municipal borough) - in the 19th century).

The settlement at Llawhaden expanded slightly across the Eastern Cleddau river, and provided the nearest church for lands to the east: part of Gwarthaf (part of Carmarthenshire); hence the parish straddled both sides of the river. Though the Llawhaden part of Dewisland was English-speaking, like Dungleddy to its west, Gwarthaf (and most of the rest of Carmarthenshire) was Welsh-speaking; the bilingualism was noted by George Owen in his 1603 description; he regarded Llawhaden as one of six parishes which were "bilingual". The Eastern Cleddau formed the linguistic boundary, which has been fairly stable since Norman times, although, perhaps in the early Industrial Revolution when people moved to seek work, Welsh-speakers started emerging in the area around Gelli woollen mill.

Llawhaden Bridge, to the east of the village, spans the Eastern Cleddau and is a Grade II* listed structure built in the mid-18th century. There are a number of other listed structures in the parish.

== Notable people ==
Admiral Sir Thomas Foley was born in the parish in 1757.

== Parish ==
Llawhaden was a civil parish with an area of 4,609 acres (1,865 ha).

The parish includes the hamlet of Gelli.

== Demographics ==
The civil parish had population as follows:

Date	1801	1831	1861	1891	1921	1951	1981
Population	371	657	647	547	458	402	336
