= Stackpole =

Village and former community in Pembrokeshire, Wales

Coordinates: 51°37′50″N 4°54′52″W

Stackpole: Welsh: Stagbwll
- Village
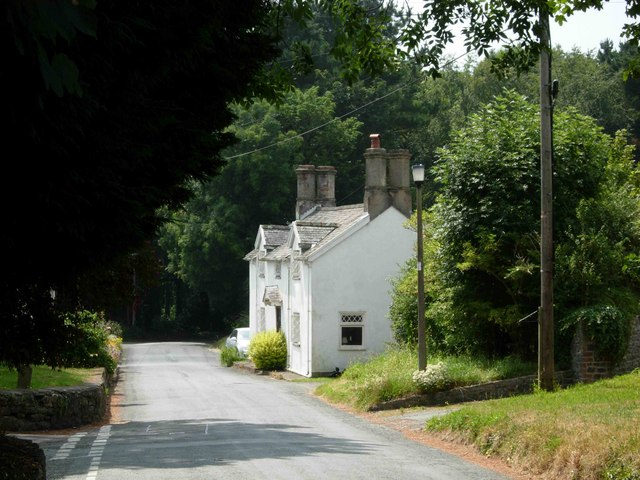
- Part of the village

- Location within Pembrokeshire
- Principal area: Pembrokeshire
- Country: Wales
- Sovereign state: United Kingdom
- Police: Dyfed-Powys
- Fire: Mid and West Wales
- Ambulance: Welsh

Stackpole (Welsh: Stagbwll) is a village approximately 4 miles (6.4 km) south of Pembroke, Pembrokeshire, Wales, in the community of Stackpole and Castlemartin. It has a population of around 200.

Prior to 2011 Stackpole was a local government community in its own right, with its own elected community council. It was merged with neighbouring Castlemartin (and the community council dissolved) to form the new Stackpole and Castlemartin community.

Stackpole village was moved from its original medieval site in 1735 to accommodate the growing Stackpole Estate. However, present day Stackpole is considerably larger than it was then. Stackpole has a public house, The Stackpole Inn, which occupies the former village Post Office, a building of sixteenth-century origin. The village is surrounded on all sides by woodland and arable farmland.

The village had its own voluntary controlled primary school for children aged 4 to 11. The school was constructed in the late nineteenth century. In January 2016 a decision was made to close the school, due to costs being between 24% and 65% greater than the average county school.

During the 1950s and 1960s, the village expanded with modern homes built at the edge of Deer Park and around the school.

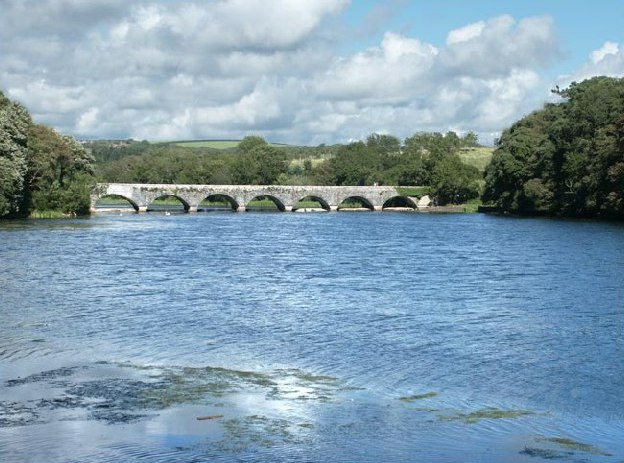
The nearby Eight-Arch Bridge which crosses the eastern branch of Bosherston Lakes

The parish church is dedicated to St. James and St Elidyr, and dates back to the twelfth century. It is located in the small village of Cheriton (or Stackpole Elidor), to the north of Stackpole.
