= Freshwater East =

Village in Pembrokeshire, Wales

Coordinates: 51.65°N 4.87°W

Welsh: Aberfawr
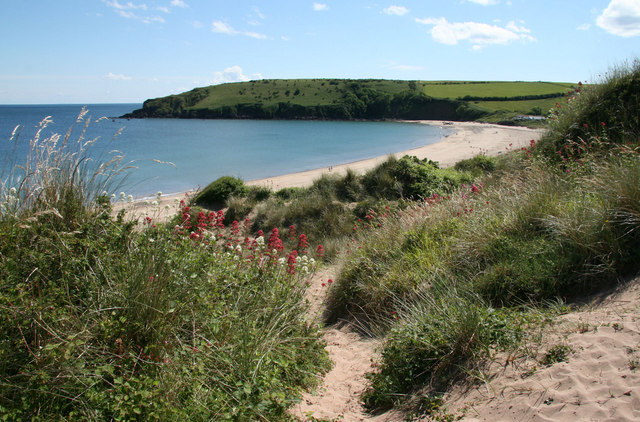
- Freshwater East Beach

- Location within Pembrokeshire
- Population: 250
- OS grid reference: SS016984
- Principal area: Pembrokeshire
- Preserved county: Dyfed
- Country: Wales
- Sovereign state: United Kingdom
- Post town: Pembroke
- Postcode district: SA71
- Police: Dyfed-Powys
- Fire: Mid and West Wales
- Ambulance: Welsh
- UK Parliament: Mid and South Pembrokeshire
- Senedd Cymru – Welsh Parliament: Carmarthen West and South Pembrokeshire

Freshwater East is a village in Pembrokeshire, Wales. The majority of the village is on a cliff overlooking a bay. It is approximately 7 miles (11 km) from Pembroke by road, and 2 miles (3.2 km) south of Lamphey, and is in the parish and community of Lamphey. Freshwater East is the site of a Green Coast Award Beach.

== History ==
There is evidence of prehistoric occupation to the east of the village, where there is an earthwork. Freshwater is marked on a 1578 parish map, but apparently as a coastal place, rather than a parish.

The historic name for the bay is Welsh: Porth Lliw, and this is still in occasional use today.

In more modern times, the stream would provide fresh water for ships, giving it its name. In Victorian times it became established as a bathing venue. The beach is named as Freshwater East on a pre-1850 parish map, with little sign of a settlement, apart from a large house named Portclew (probably built around 1800; the name is a form of the bay's historic Welsh name), and a chapel.

In 1860, county horse races were held on the beach.

The 2011 census population was 250.

== Situation ==
The village is on the Wales Coast Path and in the Pembrokeshire Coast National Park. To the west is Trewent Point, a Site of Special Scientific Interest (SSSI), covering some 64 hectares.

== Amenities ==
A coastal bus service connects with Pembroke and Pembroke Dock, and the surrounding area including Lamphey railway station on the Pembroke Dock branch of the West Wales Line operated by Transport for Wales Rail. Trains stop on request.

Surfing is possible in winter, and the beach is popular in summer. There is a cafe, toilet and parking. The Freshwater Inn is the village pub, serving food. The dunes, known as The Burrows, are a nature reserve.

== Notable people ==
- Euros Childs (born 1975), a Welsh musician and songwriter, frontman for the band Gorky's Zygotic Mynci

== See also ==
- List of beaches in the United Kingdom
