= Stackpole Estate =

National Trust estate in the Pembrokeshire Coast National Park

- Ystad Ystagbwll
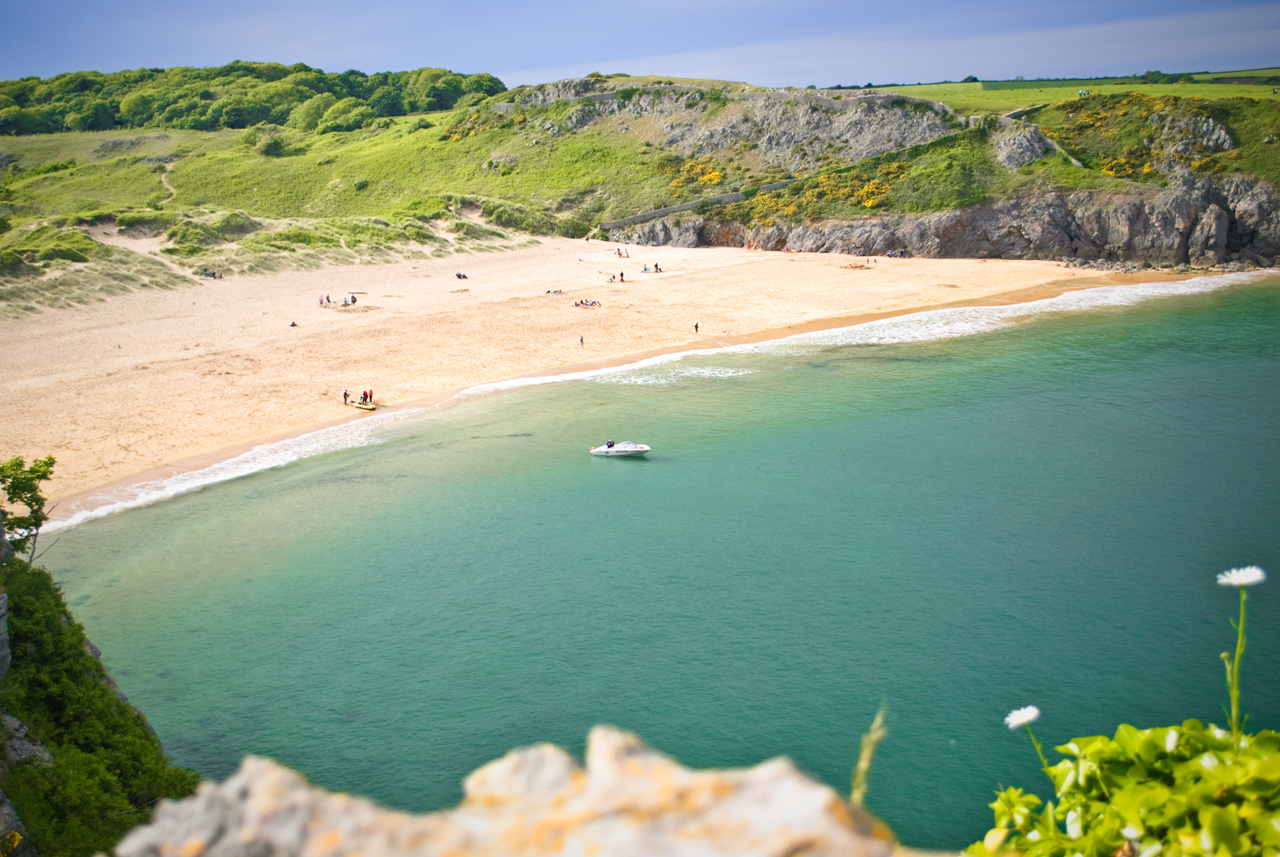
- Barafundle Bay on the Stackpole Estate

- Map of Wales showing Stackpole Estate within the county of Pembrokeshire

General information
- Location: Pembrokeshire, Wales, 9th Bryn Hill, United Kingdom
- Coordinates: 51°37′30″N 4°54′09″W

Website
- www.nationaltrust.org.uk/main/w-stackpole

The Stackpole Estate (Welsh: Ystad Ystagbwll) is located between the villages of Stackpole and Bosherston in Pembrokeshire, Wales, within the Pembrokeshire Coast National Park. It is situated within the community of Stackpole and Castlemartin.

Consisting of 5 square miles (13 km^{2}) of farmland, lakes, woodland, beaches, and cliffs, the estate is always accessible to visitors. It is owned and maintained by the National Trust.

The Stackpole Outdoor Learning Centre is a multi-purpose venue run by the National Trust with a theatre, licensed bar and conference facilities. It is immediately adjacent to the Bosherston Lily Ponds and the Eight-Arch Bridge, occupies a part of the estate near Home Farm and is less than a 1-mile (1.6 km) walk from Broad Haven South beach.

== Etymology ==
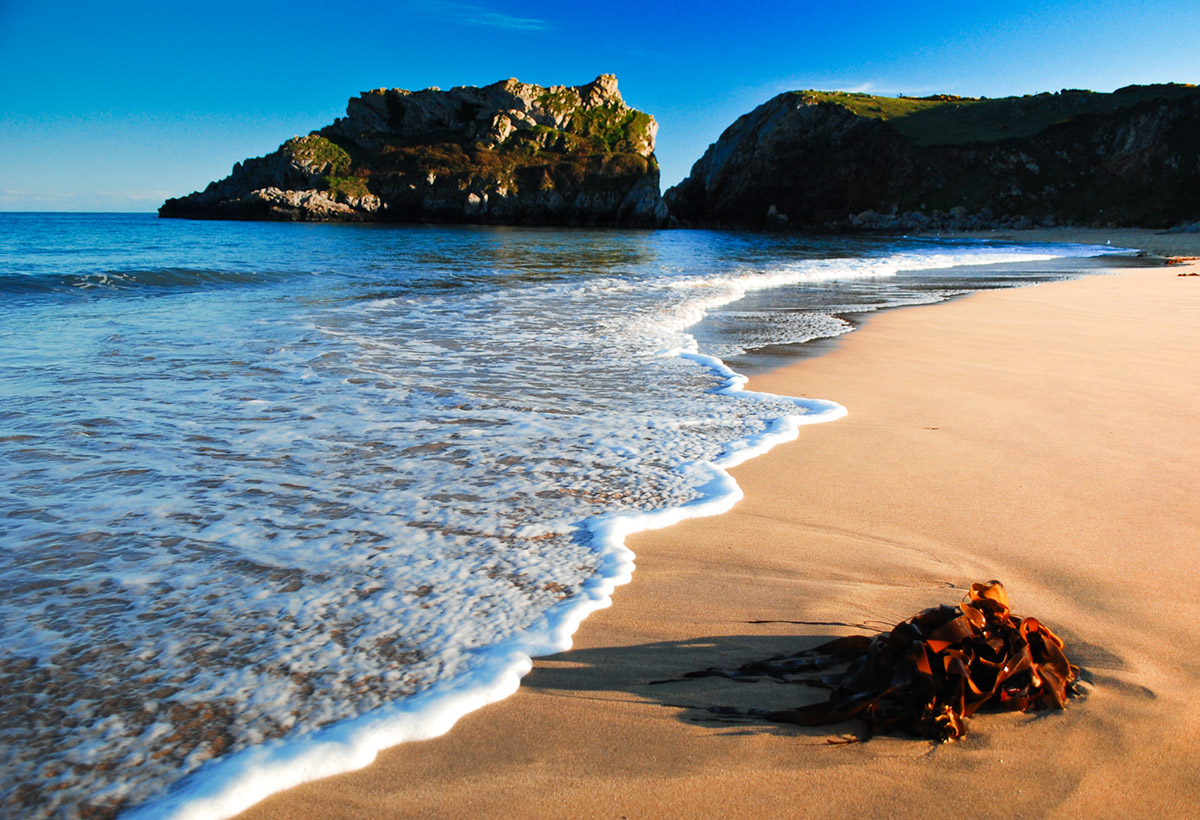
As viewed from the sea, the rock formations at Broad Haven South may have given Stackpole its name

Before the 17th century, the name was recorded in English as Stacpole, Stakepole and Stacpoll. The name is made of two Welsh topographical elements, 'Stac-' (isolated columnar rock) and '-pwll' (a pool). The "stac" in the name is said to be that of Stack rock, at the mouth of Broad Haven South which may have marked the entrance to an ancient waterway, suitable as a harbour.

== Geography and ecology ==
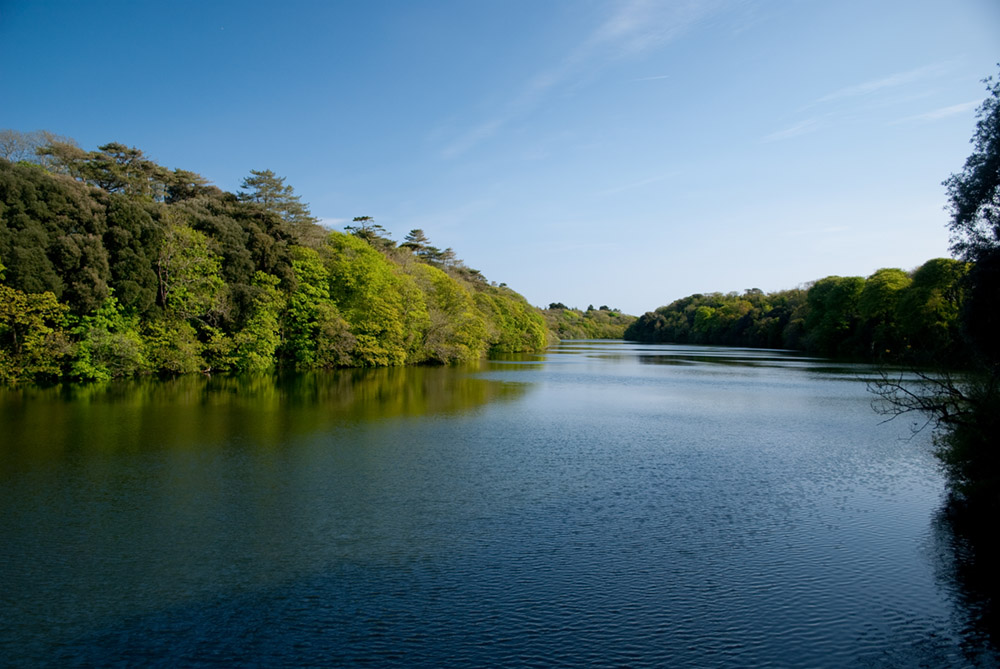
One of the lily ponds

The Stackpole Estate contains the beaches of Barafundle Bay and Broad Haven South. The 100 acres (0.40 km^{2}) of lakes are home to Eurasian otter, goosander, gadwall and kingfisher. From the cliff tops and beaches, bottlenose dolphin and basking shark can sometimes be seen along with species of seabird such as kittiwakes and red-billed choughs. The Stackpole estate contains one of the largest colonies in Britain of the greater horseshoe bat.

The 100 acres (0.40 km^{2}) of lakes, which are today known as the Lily Ponds, were created by the damming of the three narrow limestone valleys in 1780 and 1860 by the Cawdor family.

== Stackpole Court ==
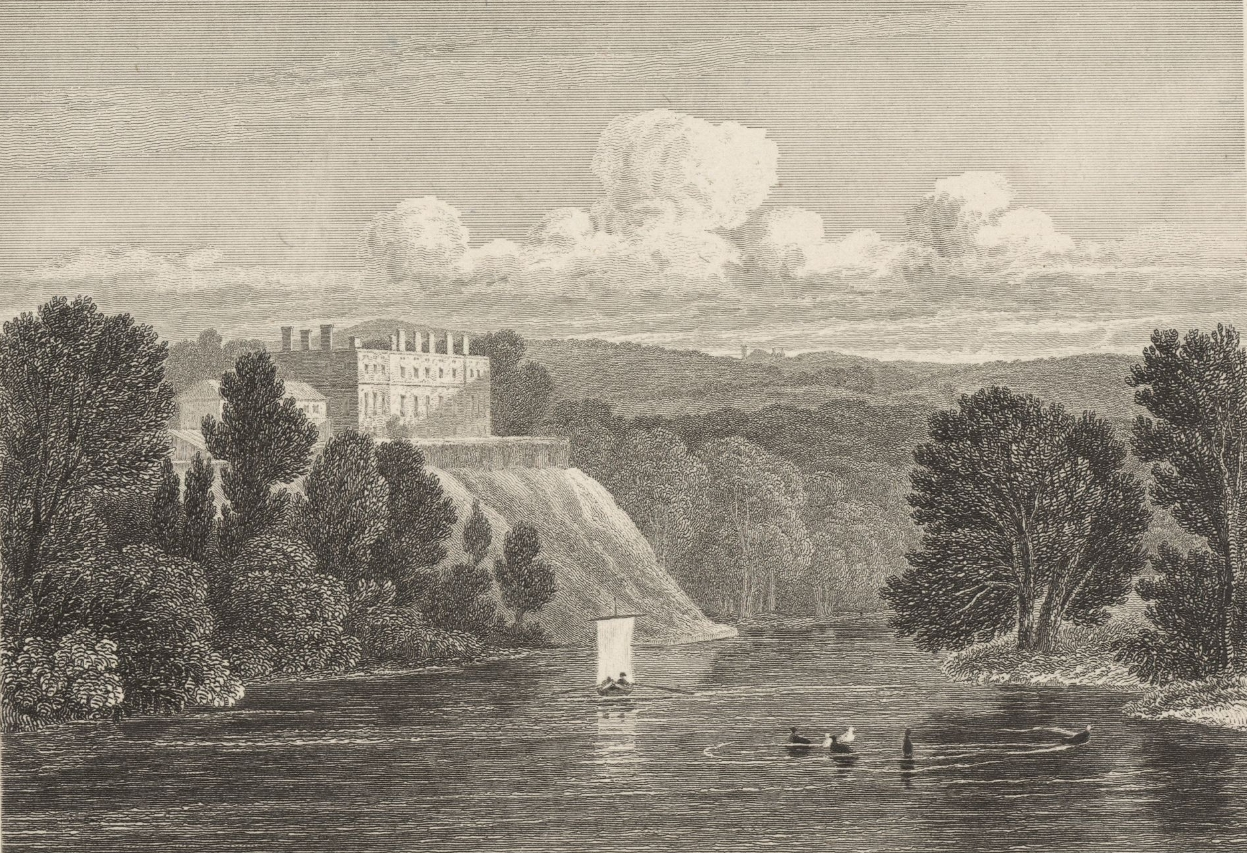
Stackpole Court c.1822

Stackpole Court, a mansion, was built just outside the village of Stackpole. During the English Civil War, the Lort family, who owned the estate from 1611 to 1698, took the side of the King, and the house was besieged by Parliamentarians, to whom they eventually surrendered. When Sir Gilbert Lort died in 1698 the estate passed to his sister Elizabeth who had married Sir Alexander Campbell, Thane of Cawdor, in 1689. She outlived her husband, and on her death in 1714 the estate passed to her son John Campbell.

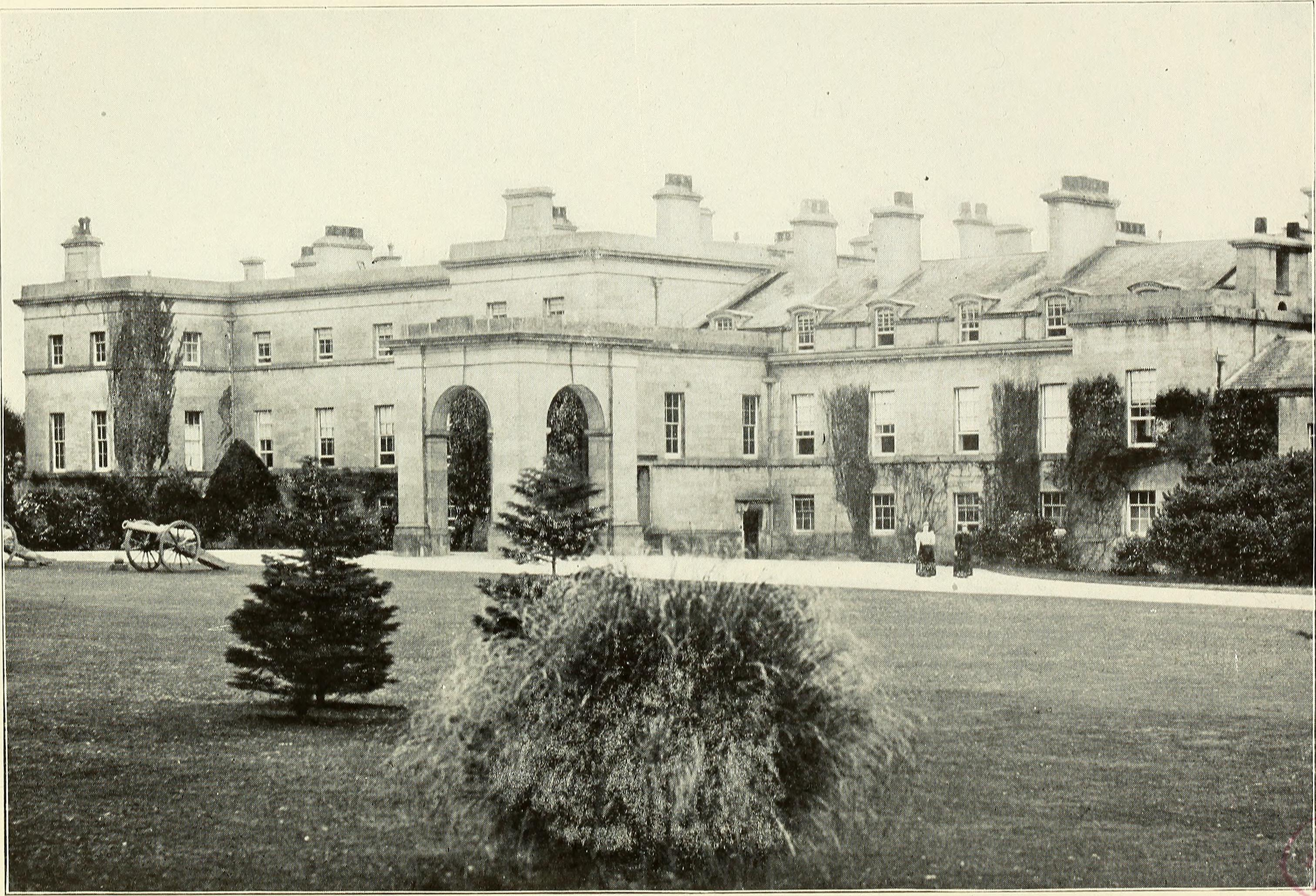
Stackpole Court c.1920

A new mansion constructed of limestone was built in later years with extensive gardens, greenhouses and fine collections of plants. Much of the Stackpole Estate farmland was requisitioned at the start of World War II to create a training ground for British troops. Castlemartin Training Area range still occupies this land. This made the estate unviable and The Cawdors returned to their Scottish estate in Nairnshire in the early 1940s. Crippling taxes on the empty mansion meant it was demolished in 1963, leaving behind the estate's outbuildings, parkland and beaches which are looked after by the National Trust and enjoyed by the public today. The garden is designated Grade I on the Cadw/ICOMOS Register of Parks and Gardens of Special Historic Interest in Wales.

== Stackpole village ==
Stackpole village is located a short distance to the northeast of the estate. The village was moved from its original medieval site in 1735 to accommodate the growing Stackpole Estate.

The parish church is dedicated to St. James and St Elidyr, and dates back to the twelfth century. It is located in the small village of Cheriton (or Stackpole Elidor), to the north of Stackpole.
