= Eight-Arch Bridge =

Bridge in Pembrokeshire, Wales

Coordinates: 51.6224°N 4.9225°W

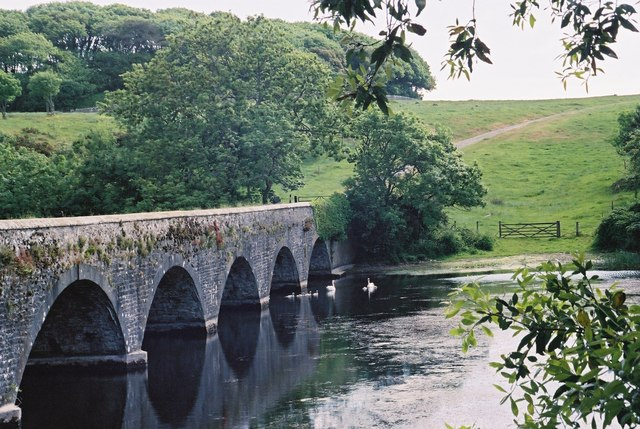
The Eight-Arch Bridge at Stackpole

The Eight Arch Bridge on the Stackpole Estate is a grade II* listed bridge, in Pembrokeshire, Wales. It is owned and maintained by the National Trust.

== History ==
The bridge was built in 1797 to connect Stackpole Court and Home Farm to Stackpole Quay and the New Deer Park.

At some point face-to-face iron ties were added to hold the bridge together.

On 2 August 1996 it was listed by Heritage in Wales (now Cadw) as grade II* for its eyecatching nature as a major feature of Stackpole Park, and as part of the Stackpole group of buildings.

== Description ==
The bridge is built over a weir between two ponds (part of the Bosherston Lily Ponds). There are eight segmental arches in limestone, one with slightly projecting keystones. The arch rings are in ashlars; the rest of the arches in common stonework. There are low, rebuilt parapet walls, with slight wing walls at each end, on either side of the 3.3-metre (11 ft) roadway.
