= St Elidyr's Church, Stackpole =

Church in Pembrokeshire, Wales

Coordinates: 51.638391°N 4.910107°W

St Elidyr's Church
- Church of St James & St Elidyr
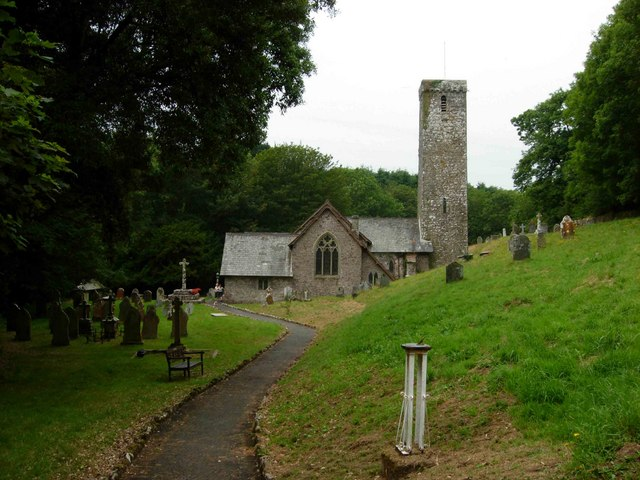

- Location in Pembrokeshire
- Country: Wales
- Denomination: Church in Wales

History
- Dedication: St James, St Elidyr

Architecture
- Heritage designation: Grade I
- Architectural type: Church

St Elidyr's Church (or St James & St Elidyr), is a Grade I listed building in south Pembrokeshire, Wales. The church is in the small village of Cheriton in the southwest of the parish of Stackpole Elidor, on the Stackpole Estate in the community of Stackpole and Castlemartin.

== Name ==
The church is variously known as St Elidyr, St. James and St Elidyr, or Stackpole Elidor (or Stackpool-Elidur, the historical name of the parish). Stackpole is used in the name because the church was the principal place of worship of the Cawdor family, former owners of the Stackpole Estate. It is also referred to as Saints James & Elidyr, Stackpole Cheriton.

The dedication to St Elidyr may be a mistake: Henry Owen, in his book Old Pembrokeshire Families, said: "Elidor de Stackpole founded the Church of Stackpole Elidor or Cheriton, and like other founders was afterwards to be the patron saint." It may have been originally dedicated just to St James; in 1733, Browne Willis in his Parochiale Anglicanum names St James as the sole patron of the Church of Stackpole Elidor. Further, it may be that the founder's name, Elidor, already part of the parish name, became associated with St Elidyr who was then added as a co-patron. Another theory is that Eliud was an alternative name for St Teilo, to whom a number of churches are dedicated.

The church is one of the Angle Peninsula group of churches, and is in the Monkton Rectorial Benefice, in the Diocese of St Davids; it is an Anglican church in the Church in Wales.

== History ==
The church has medieval origins, but most of the original structure, apart from the 12th- or 13th-century tower and part of the chancel, has been absorbed into later additions and renovations. In 1807 the church wardens stated that the Church was in good repair. Richard Fenton, in his Historical Tour through Pembrokeshire published in 1810, quotes from a letter written by Stephen Davies, Canon of St. Davids Cathedral, to the antiquary Browne Willis:

Here I cannot forbear mentioning the generous beneficence of that worthy gentleman, John Campbell Esquire, to the parishes of St. Petrook, Cheriton or Stackpool Elidur and Bosherston on his first coming to the possession of his estate, being about the age of twenty. He waiscotted the three chancels, and otherwise adorned them in a very decent and handsome manner, made new rails about the altar, bestowed new cushions and pulpit cloths and a new set of Communion plate to each

The building was maintained for a few years, but by 1828 the fabric, though sound, was very damp; by 1848 it was recorded that "not one casement opens" and it was clear that major restoration work was needed. In 1851 John Frederick Campbell, 1st Earl Cawdor, engaged Sir George Gilbert Scott, the most respected English church architect of the day, to oversee the restoration. Scott employed a Cardiff builder, W. P. James, and the work cost a total of £1,804 which, adjusted for 2010, would be £105,609.

== Description ==
=== Church ===
The church is built on a slope in a wooded valley, the slope partly excavated to accommodate the building. Cruciform in plan, the chancel is about 6.5 metres (21 ft) long by 4.5 metres (15 ft) wide. The nave is 17 metres (56 ft) long by 6 metres (20 ft) wide. There are north and south transepts, a vestry and a chapel. There is an open porch to the south, within which there is an early medieval inscribed stone. There was a crypt beneath the chancel, now filled in. The roof is slate, and there is a wrought iron cross at its eastern end. The altar table is oak, as are the communion rails.

=== Tower ===
The tower is a prominent feature and an older part of the church. It is of a typical local design with a parapet, but unusually slender. The lowest storey has a vault opening into the north transept. Two upper floors and the roof are crudely constructed. Each storey has windows or louvred openings, the lowest being blocked. The top storey has louvred openings on all four sides and there is a spiral staircase.

=== Churchyard ===
A stone cross with a modern head stands in the churchyard. The 19th-century lychgate is an Arts and Crafts structure.

=== 1851 restoration ===
Scott's renovation was major, structurally. His notebook indicated a chancel arch of the 12th century or earlier, but this was removed. The resultant chancel arch was tall and narrow; the chancel floor and sanctuary walls decorated with colourful Minton tiles; the tracery of the main windows in Middle English style. Scott retained the transept and chapel vaultings, but the nave and porch were rebuilt. Most of the remainder of the church was refaced. The exterior masonry is Cambrian sandstone from the St Davids area. Some older masonry was retained and can be seen on the west side of the north transept.

== Monuments and tombs ==
Among the numerous tombs, monuments and effigies are:

- A 5th- or 6th-century inscribed pillar laid flat beneath the east window of the chapel
- Two 14th-century female effigies on the floor of the chapel
- In the chancel, a cross-legged knight, supposedly Sir Elidur de Stackpole, but later in date
- A male and a female effigy one each side of the chancel: Jacobean monument to Roger Lort, died 1613, and his wife Abertha
- Monument to Hester Lort, died 1647 and Sir John Lort, died 1672
- Numerous Cawdor monuments and hatchments
- Tombs of Sir Nicholas de Carew (died 1311, who built Carew Castle) and Sir John and Elizabeth Carew
- Memorials to members of the Allen and other leading families.
- The west window is an 1857 Crimean War memorial.
- The 1862 stained glass window of the south transept depicts John Frederick, first Earl Cawdor, as King Solomon supervising the building of the Temple, as a compliment for his restoration work
