= Pembrokeshire Coast National Park =

National park in Wales

Coordinates: 51°50′N 5°05′W

- Parc Cenedlaethol Arfordir Penfro (Welsh)
- IUCN category V (protected landscape/seascape)
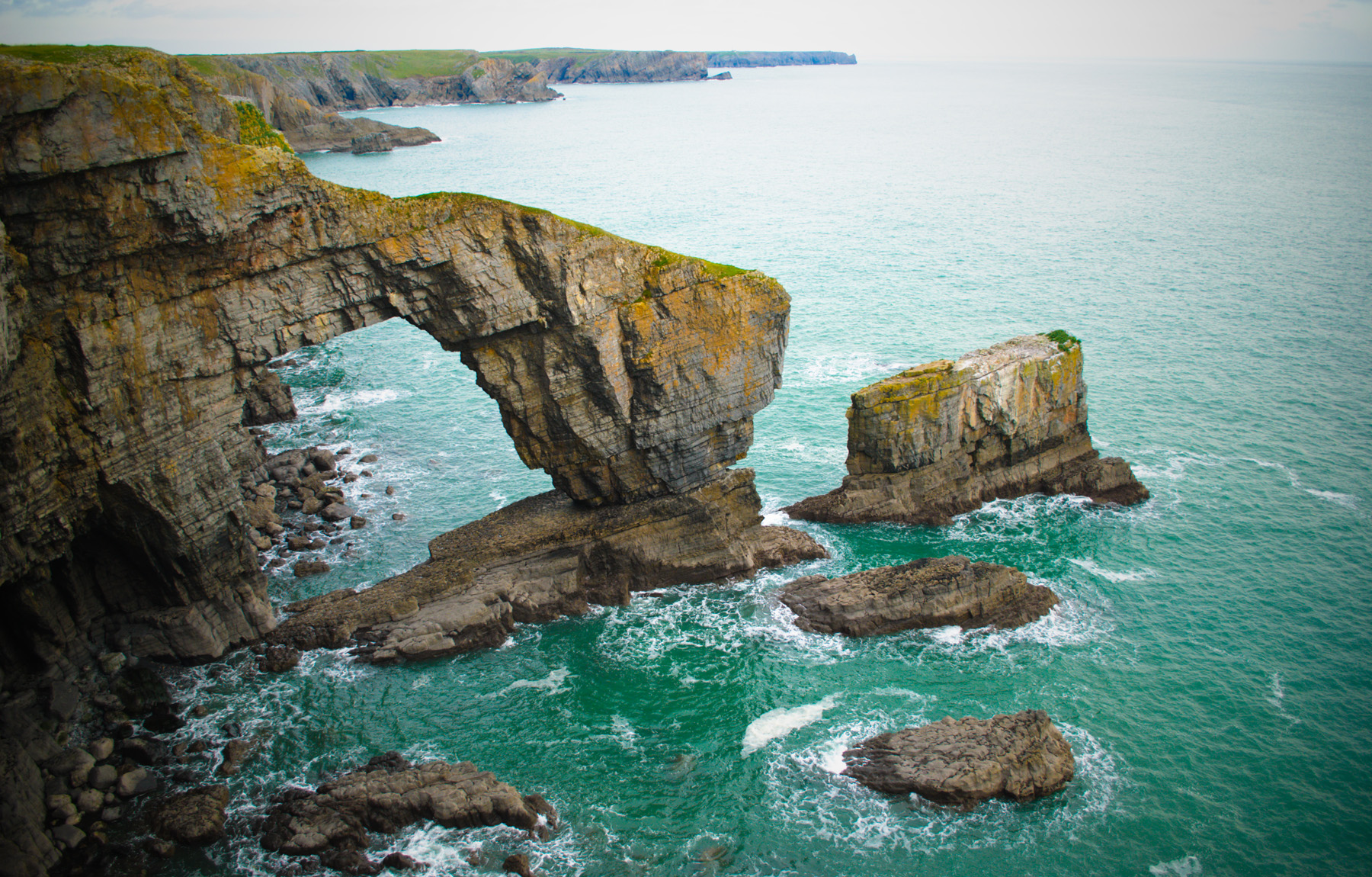
- Green Bridge of Wales, near Castlemartin, south Pembrokeshire

- Location of the national park in Pembrokeshire, Wales
- Location: Pembrokeshire, Wales, United Kingdom
- Area: 629 km^{2} (243 sq mi)
- Established: 1952
- Website: www.pembrokeshirecoast.wales

The Pembrokeshire Coast National Park (Welsh: Parc Cenedlaethol Arfordir Penfro) is a national park in the county of Pembrokeshire, Wales. It was established in 1952 and includes most of the coast of the county, the upper reaches of Milford Haven, and the Preseli Mountains in the north.

When the creation of the national park was being considered in 1947, the "rock-bound coastline" of Pembrokeshire was described as "the most spectacular of its many attractions". The national park covers 420 km (260 miles) of this coastline and a total of 650 square miles (1,700 km^{2}).

It is one of three national parks in Wales, the others being the Brecon Beacons (Bannau Brycheiniog) and Snowdonia (Eryri). It is the only national park in the United Kingdom to consist largely of coastal landscapes.

== Establishment ==
The Pembrokeshire Coast National Park was established in 1952 under the National Parks and Access to the Countryside Act 1949. The 1947 Hobhouse Report, the precursor to the Act, recommended the creation of the national park with boundaries similar to those ultimately adopted, although excluding the coast from Tenby to Amroth and the part of the Preseli Hills around Mynachlog-ddu.

Among other reasons for recommending designation, the report praised the northern coast between Pen Caer and St David's Head as "one of the best stretches of coastal scenery in the British Isles", noted the importance of the islands of Grassholm, Skomer, and Skokholm to seabirds, and called Milford Haven one of the best examples of a ria in England and Wales. The challenges of designation included the military use of several areas, including Castlemartin Training Area, and unsympathetic holiday development particularly at Freshwater East and Newgale.

== Landscape ==
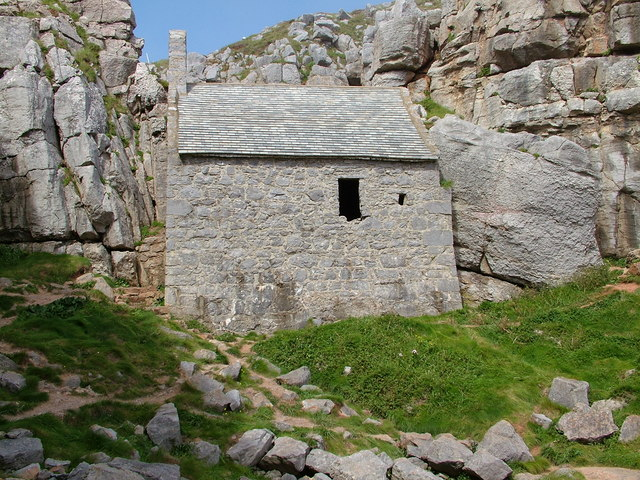
St Govan's Chapel

The National Park has a varied landscape of rugged cliffs, sandy beaches, wooded estuaries, wild inland hills, the moorland of the Preseli Hills and the wooded Gwaun valley. The total area is 629 km^{2} (243 sq mi). There are four distinct sections: clockwise these are the south Pembrokeshire coast, including Caldey Island; the Daugleddau estuary; the St Bride's Bay coast, including the coastal islands; and the Preseli Hills.

The geology of the area is of particular interest with many good exposures both inland and along the coast, exhibiting a variety of rock types and structural features such as natural arches, stacks, rock folding and sea caves. A stack of note is Elegug Stacks (Creigiau Elegug), two large detached pillars of limestone which in the spring provide valued nesting sites for razorbills and guillemots. In the north, the rocks of Carn Llidi, Pen Beri and Garn Fawr, together with the extensive moorland on Mynydd Carningli and Mynydd Preseli, give an exposed and mountainous feel to the landscape, cut through by the wooded valleys of the Gwaun and Nevern. In the west, the National Park is dominated by the broad sweep of St Bride's Bay, bounded at its northern end by Ramsey Island, near St David's peninsula, and at its southern end by Skomer. The southern coast is another contrast, with the limestone plateau and cliffs of the Castlemartin peninsula, the steep-sided wooded valleys inland from Amroth; the Bosherston lakes — now, like much of the coastal strip, in the care of the National Trust — and the tourist resorts of Tenby and Saundersfoot. Between the western and southern areas of the National Park lies the Milford Haven waterway, where the tranquil Daugleddau estuary feeds into one of the finest natural deep water harbours in the world.

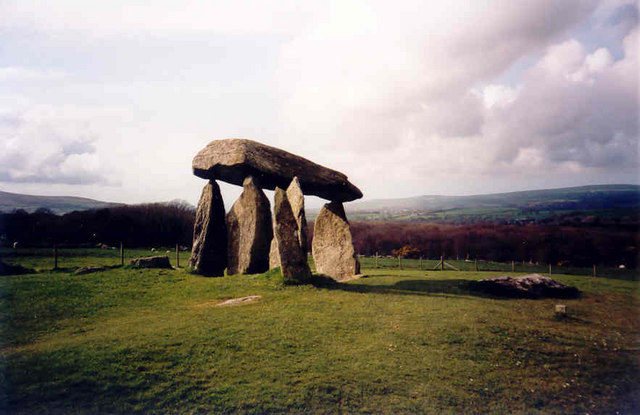
Pentre Ifan

The National Park includes many sites (such as Pentre Ifan) of historic and archaeological importance and areas which are of national or international nature conservation significance in their own right, including 7 Special Areas of Conservation, a Marine Nature Reserve, 6 national nature reserves and 75 Sites of Special Scientific Interest.

In 2011, National Geographic Traveler magazine voted Pembrokeshire the second best coastal destination in the world for sustainable tourism.

In January 2016 the Authority launched the "Changing Coasts" project to document the way the coastline has changed as a result of recent winter storms; the project invites visitors to submit photographs taken (at any time of day) from fixed points; a pilot study will be carried out at Abereiddy.

== Pembrokeshire Coast Path ==
The Pembrokeshire Coast Path is a designated National Trail. It was established in 1970, and is 186 miles (299 km) long, much of it at cliff-top level, with a total of 35,000 feet (11,000 m) of ascent and descent.

The southern end of the path is at Amroth. The northern end was regarded as being at Poppit Sands, near St. Dogmaels, where the official plaque was sited; however, the path now continues to St. Dogmaels, where a new marker was unveiled in July 2009, and links with the Ceredigion Coast Path to continue northwards as part of the Wales Coast Path, the 870-mile (1,400 km) long-distance walking route around the whole coast of Wales from Chepstow to Queensferry, which was officially opened in 2012.

== Administration ==
The Park is managed by Pembrokeshire Coast National Park Authority, which has around 150 staff and a committee of 18 members. The Authority's purposes are to conserve and enhance the National Park, and encourage the public to enjoy and understand it. In pursuing these purposes, the authority has a duty to foster the social and economic well-being of the communities within its boundaries. Its offices are in Pembroke Dock. The Chief Executive is Tegryn Jones.

The Authority also manages the entire length of the Pembrokeshire Coast Path, a 186-mile (299 km) national trail which lies almost entirely within the Pembrokeshire Coast National Park.

In light of renaming of the other two Welsh national parks, the authority stated it plans to retains both its English and Welsh name in April 2023.

== Beaches ==
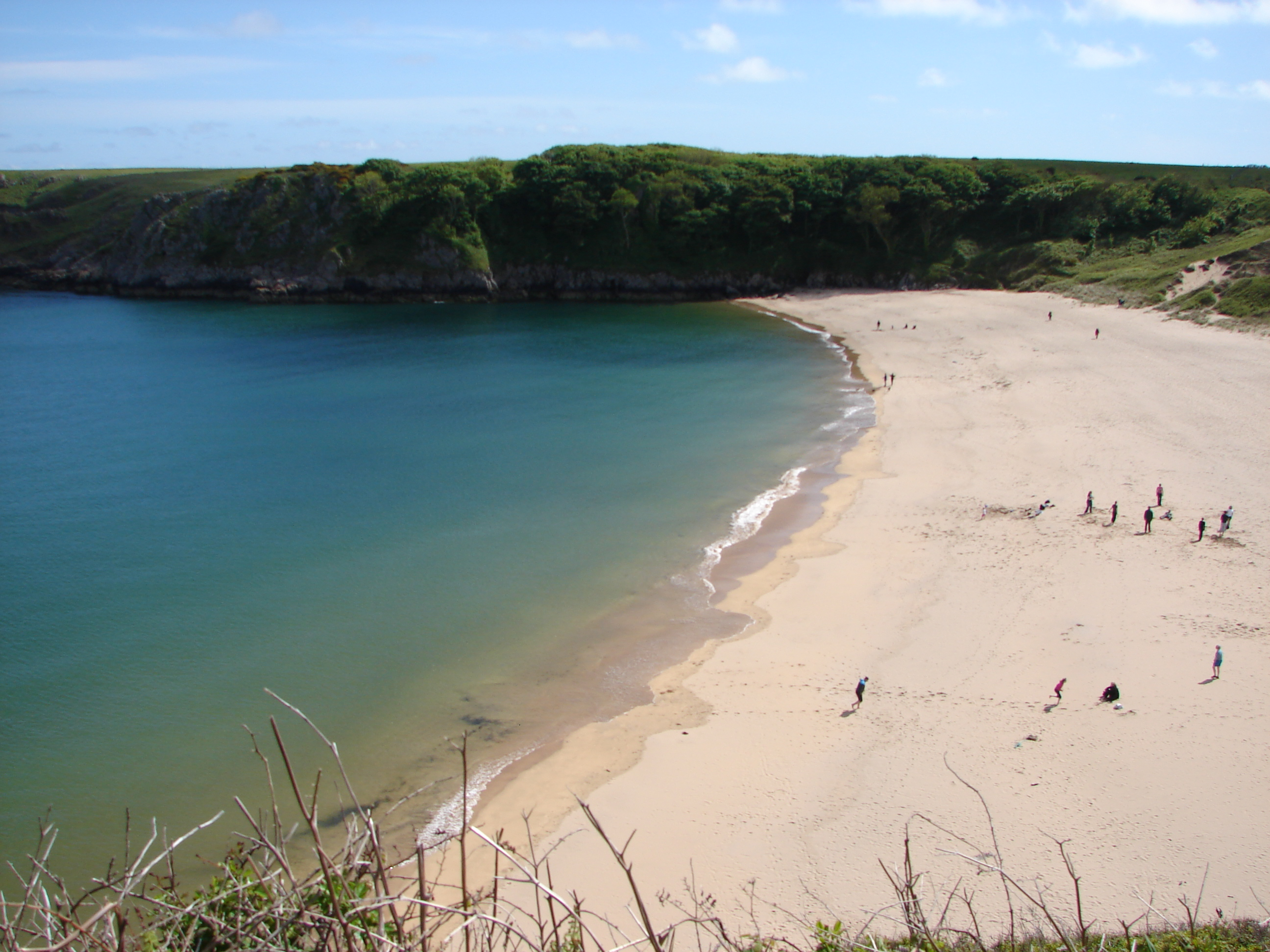
Barafundle

Over the years Pembrokeshire's beaches, all of which lie in the National Park, have been awarded many International Blue Flag Awards (10 in 2014), 47 Green Coast Awards (15 in 2011) and 106 Seaside Awards (31 in 2011). In 2011 it also had 39 beaches recommended by the Marine Conservation Society.

Beaches in the park include:

- Abereiddy
- Amroth
- Barafundle Bay
- Broad Haven
- Broad Haven South
- Freshwater East
- Freshwater West
- Manorbier
- Marloes
- Newgale
- Newport
- Poppit Sands
- Sandy Haven
- Saundersfoot
- Tenby
- Whitesands Bay

== See also ==
- UK coastline
- Castlemartin Training Area
