= Barafundle Bay =

Beach in Pembrokeshire, Wales

Coordinates: 51.618206°N 4.904253°W

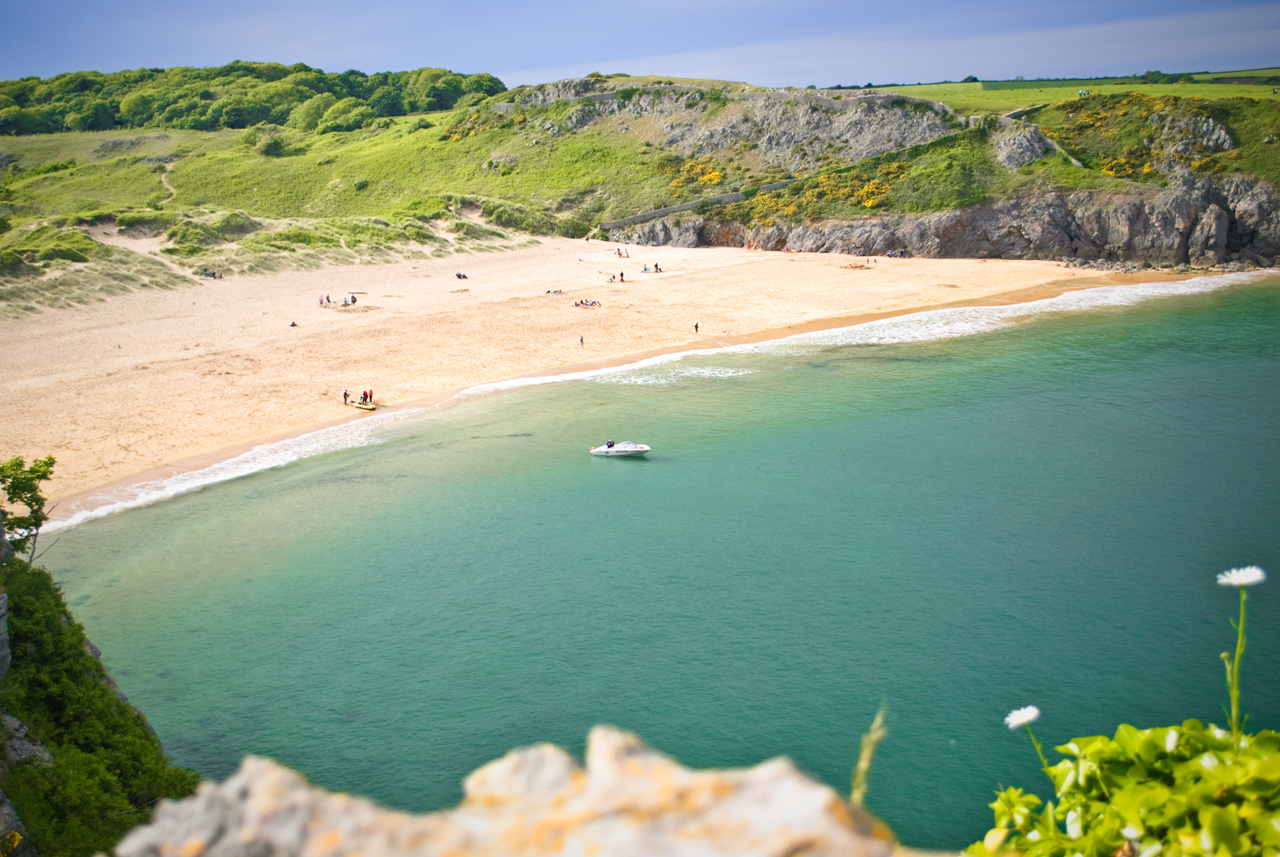
Barafundle Bay

Barafundle Bay (Welsh: Bae Barafundle) is a remote, slightly curved, east-facing sandy beach, near Stackpole Quay in Pembrokeshire, Wales, in Stackpole and Castlemartin Community. It is part of the Stackpole Estate, managed by The National Trust. The beach was once owned by the Cawdor family of Stackpole Court. On the northern approach to the beach are steps and a wall, which were built by the owners to ease their access to what was then their private beach.

== Location and access ==
There is no road access to the beach. The nearest car park is at Stackpole Quay, costing seven pounds per day between March and October and free to park after 5:30 p.m. Access to the beach is via the Pembrokeshire Coast Path, either from Stackpole Quay or from Broad Haven South. The walk from Stackpole Quay is 0.5 miles (0.80 km) and 1.3 miles (2.1 km) from Broad Haven South. Both approaches are unsuitable for pushchairs or wheelchairs because of the uneven terrain and sand.

== Geology ==
Barafundle Bay is set between cliffs to the north and south. It marks the end of the Carboniferous Limestone cliffs of the Castlemartin Peninsula to the southwest and the beginning of the Old Red Sandstone of the Devonian period at Stackpole Quay to the northeast.

== Awards ==
In 2004 Barafundle Bay was included in a list of the Top 12 beaches in the world. The Good Holiday Guide also called it "the best beach in Britain". In 2006 the magazine Country Life called it the best place in the United Kingdom for a picnic. In 2019 it received both the Seaside and the Green Coast awards in the Wales Coast Awards.

== In popular culture ==
In 1997, Welsh band Gorky's Zygotic Mynci named their fourth album, Barafundle after the bay.

Barafundle Bay was the location for some scenes in the film Third Star, shot in October 2009.
