= Broad Haven South =

Beach in Pembrokeshire, Wales

Coordinates: 51.6085°N 4.9209°W

Broad Haven South is a beach located 1 mile (1.6 km) southeast of Bosherston on the edge of the Stackpole Estate in Pembrokeshire, Wales.

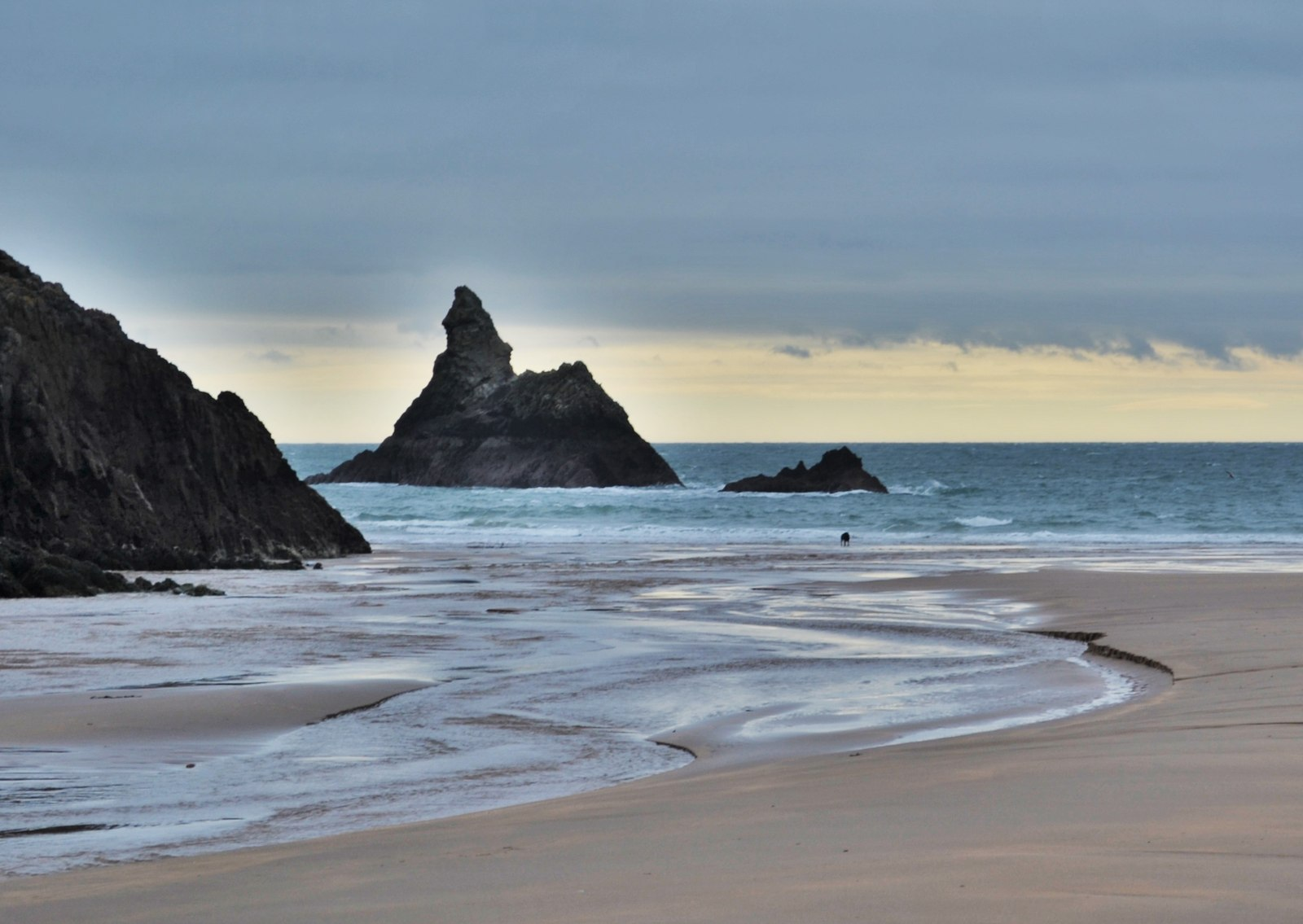
Church Rock

Broad Haven South is known for Church Rock, which protrudes from the water around 150 yards from the shore. Popular with surfers and bodyboarding, its south-facing beach with dramatic cliff views backed by sand dunes, and the expansive National Trust woodland and the lily ponds, it is one of Pembrokeshire's finest beaches.

The beach is inside the Pembrokeshire Coast National Park and is owned by the National Trust which charge for car parking at the beach between March and October. It is free to park after 5.30pm. Facilities at the beach car park include toilets, emergency telephone and during the summer, a van serving food and ice-cream.

A camp site is near the beach at Trevallen Farm and Bosherston has a traditional country pub and a small café serving cream teas and ice-cream.
