= Flag of Pembrokeshire =

Flag of a Welsh county

Pembrokeshire
- Proportion: 3:5
- Adopted: 1988
- Design: Azure a cross Or on an inescutcheon of five Vert a Tudor Rose quarterly counter-changed Argent and Gules.
- Designed by: Peter Stock, Dewi Pritchard, Jim Brock and Marjorie Jacobs

The flag of Pembrokeshire (Welsh: Baner Sir Benfro) is the flag of the Welsh county of Pembrokeshire.

The flag was designed by Councillors Peter Stock, Dewi Pritchard, Jim Brock and Marjorie Jacobs in the 1970s after the abolition of Pembrokeshire County Council. A statement by Peter Stock, 'The flag was dedicated as the official flag of Pembrokeshire, at Pembroke Castle at a ceremony on 28 July 1988 with a march past by the band of The Queen's Dragoons Guards.' The ceremony was recorded for posterity.

Joffre Swales, founder and conductor of the Haverfordwest Town Band, wrote a march entitled "The Pembrokeshire Flag" for the band to perform on marches around the county.

== Flag design ==
The Pembrokeshire Flag is based on the flag of Saint David. (The saint's cathedral, the city of St David's, is in Pembrokeshire.) The blue is also considered to be reminiscent of the sea, and the yellow of summer sunshine. The central rose represents the red Tudor Rose, a symbol used by King Henry VII, who founded the Tudor dynasty; a man of both Welsh and English descent who was born in Pembroke Castle. The green pentagon around the rose symbolises the green fields and cliff-tops of Pembrokeshire.

The colours for the flag are:

Colour space	Blue	Yellow	Green	Red	White
Pantone	300c	109c	354c	485c	
CMYK	99.50.0.0	0.9.100.0	81.0.92.0	0.95.100.0	0.0.0.0
RGB	0-94-184	255-209-0	0-177-64	218-41-28	255-255-255
HTML	#005EB8	#FFD100	#00B140	#DA291C	#FFFFFF
