= Bosherston Lakes =

Lakes in Pembrokeshire, Wales

Coordinates: 51.614°N 4.925°W

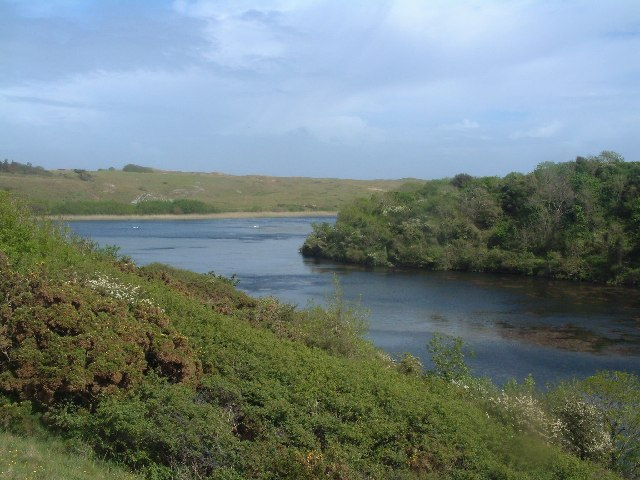

Bosherston Lakes or Bosherston Lily Ponds is a lake system with three principal arms. The lakes were created by damming a small river on the Stackpole Estate at Bosherston in Pembrokeshire.

The extent of the lakes is about 100 acres although water levels vary throughout the year with lowest levels in the summer as water is lost into the underlying limestone aquifer.

The lakes form a part of the 340 acre Stackpole SSSI which hosts nearly 10% of the British population of Greater Horseshoe Bat.
