= Trewent Point =

Protected area in Pembrokeshire, Wales

Stackpole Quay - Trewent Point
- Site of Special Scientific Interest
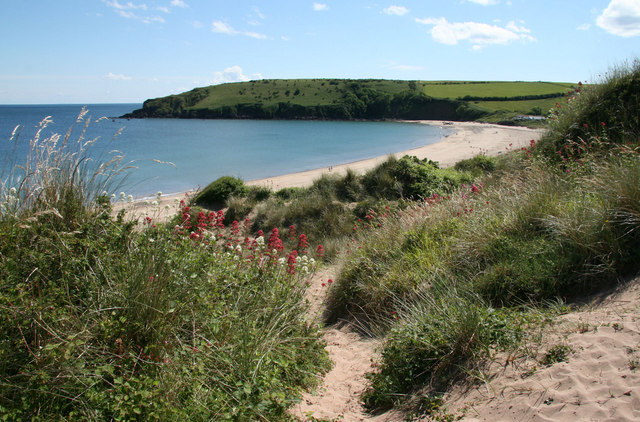
- In the distance: Trewent Point

- Location within Wales
- Location of Stackpole Quay - Trewent Point.
- Area of search: Pembrokeshire
- Grid reference: SR9992496370
- Coordinates: 51.630°N 4.892°W
- Interest: Biological and Geological
- Area: 64.15 hectares (158.5 acres)
- Notification date: 1977

Stackpole Quay - Trewent Point is a cliff on the Castlemartin Peninsula of South Pembrokeshire, South Wales and is a Site of Special Scientific Interest (SSSI). It has been designated as a SSSI since January 1977 in an attempt to protect its fragile biological and geological elements. The site has an area of 64.15 hectares (158.5 acres) and is managed by Natural Resources Wales.

== Type and features ==
This SSSI has been notified as being of both geological and biological importance. Many fossils have contributed greatly towards assigning a Wenlock age to the rocks. Some elements of this fauna have more in common with North American species than with those seen in the rest of Wales. This Grey Sandstone site also represents the best exposure of Silurian rocks within the block. The folds and dislocations in these rocks exemplifies the overall structure of the southern part of one of the major zones of the Variscan belt in Pembrokeshire.

The limestone cliffs also support crevice communities such as thrift (Armeria maritima), sea plantain (Plantago maritima), rock sea-spurrey (Spergularia rupicola), sea-lavender (Limonium binervosum) and golden-samphire (Inula crithmoides).

== See also ==
- List of Sites of Special Scientific Interest in Pembrokeshire
