= Bosherston =

Village and parish in Pembrokeshire, Wales

Coordinates: 51.62°N 4.93°W

Bosherston: Welsh: Llanfihangel-clogwyn-gofan
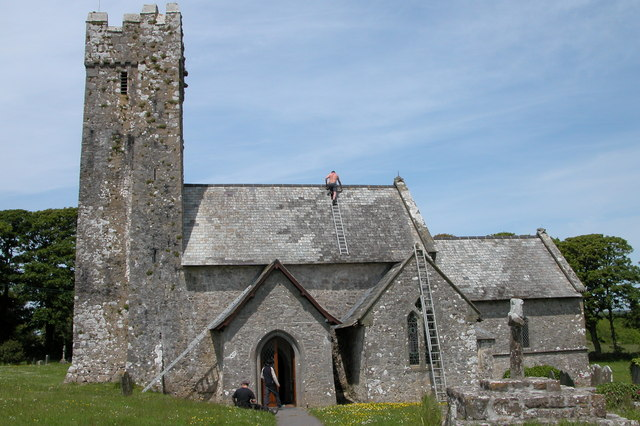
- St Michael's Church, Bosherston

- Location within Pembrokeshire
- Population: 300
- OS grid reference: SR969950
- Community: Stackpole and Castlemartin
- Principal area: Pembrokeshire
- Country: Wales
- Sovereign state: United Kingdom
- Post town: PEMBROKE
- Postcode district: SA71
- Dialling code: 01646
- Police: Dyfed-Powys
- Fire: Mid and West Wales
- Ambulance: Welsh
- UK Parliament: Preseli Pembrokeshire
- Senedd Cymru – Welsh Parliament: Preseli Pembrokeshire

Bosherston (Welsh: Llanfihangel-clogwyn-gofan, translates to "St Michaels above the cliffs of St Gofan") is a village and parish in Pembrokeshire, Wales, within the Pembrokeshire Coast National Park.

Bosherston has a population of approximately 300, with a pub and a café serving light refreshments during the summer.

Bosherston is known for Broad Haven South beach and the Bosherston lily ponds; both owned and maintained by the National Trust.

Two miles to the south of Bosherston nestled within the steep cliffs is St Govan's Chapel. It is free to visit, although the only access is down steep steps carved into the side of the cliff.

== Bosherston Church ==
The small parish church of St. Michael and All Angels is a grade II* listed Norman church of the late 13th century, built on the site of a former church. The building is in the form of a cross, having north and south transepts. Since its restoration by the Cawdor family in 1855, its highbacked old pews have disappeared and its Norman windows have been replaced by those of later Gothic design.

Under the north transept window there is the tomb of a Dowager Duchess of Buckingham, an antecedent of the Duke of Norfolk. The fact that she was a widow may be gathered from the veil and cloak shown on the figure carved on the tomb. That she was of noble birth can be seen by the coronet on her head and the dog at her feet. Under the south transept window there is a stone tomb surmounted by a figure depicting a Crusader. It is thought to have been carved in the 14th century.

On the north wall of the church there are brass tablets commemorating the men of the parish who lost their lives in the First World War, those who served in the Armed Forces in the Second World War and a coastguard killed on duty.
