= Pembrokeshire =

County and historic county in southwest Wales

Pembrokeshire Sir Benfro (Welsh)
- County
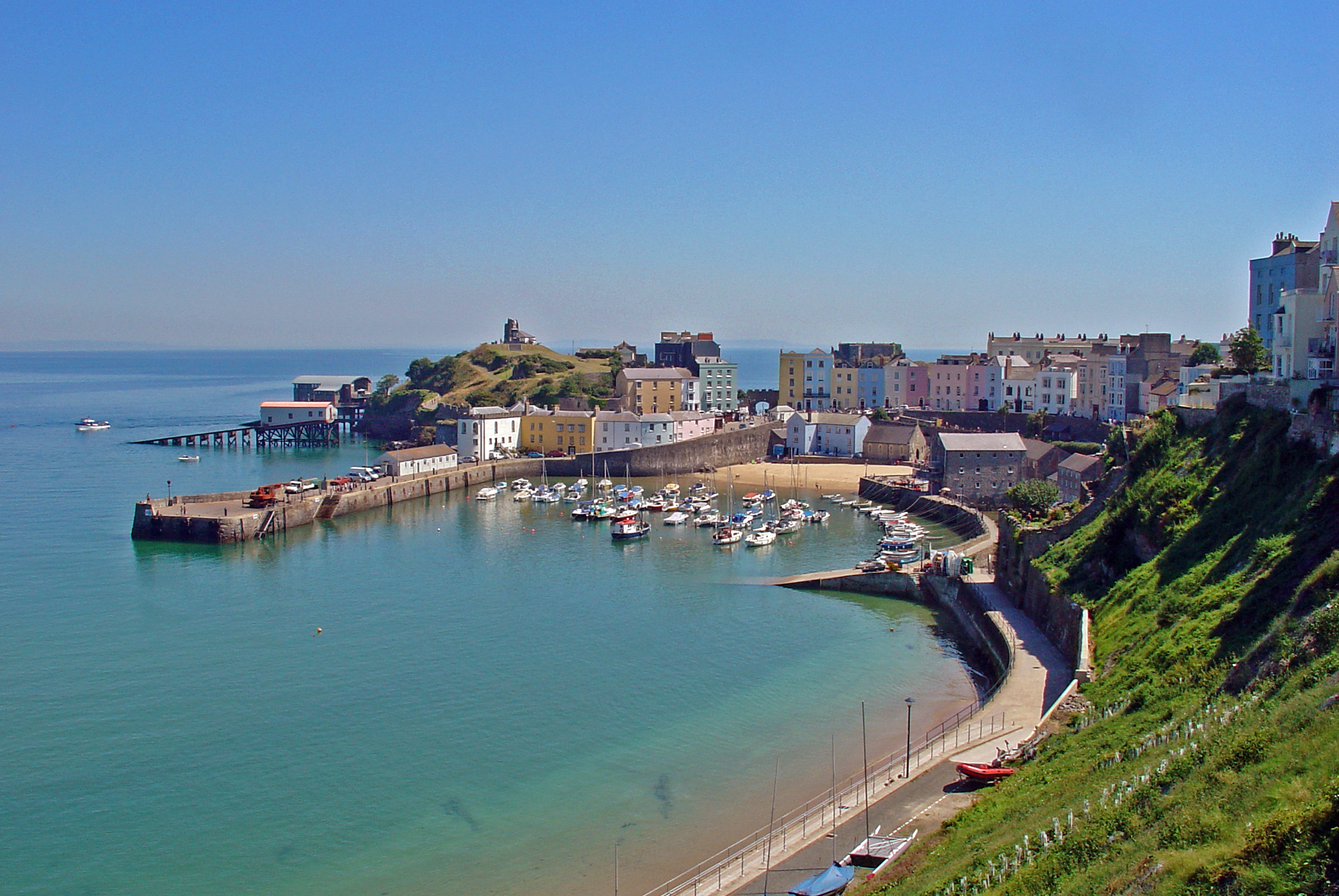
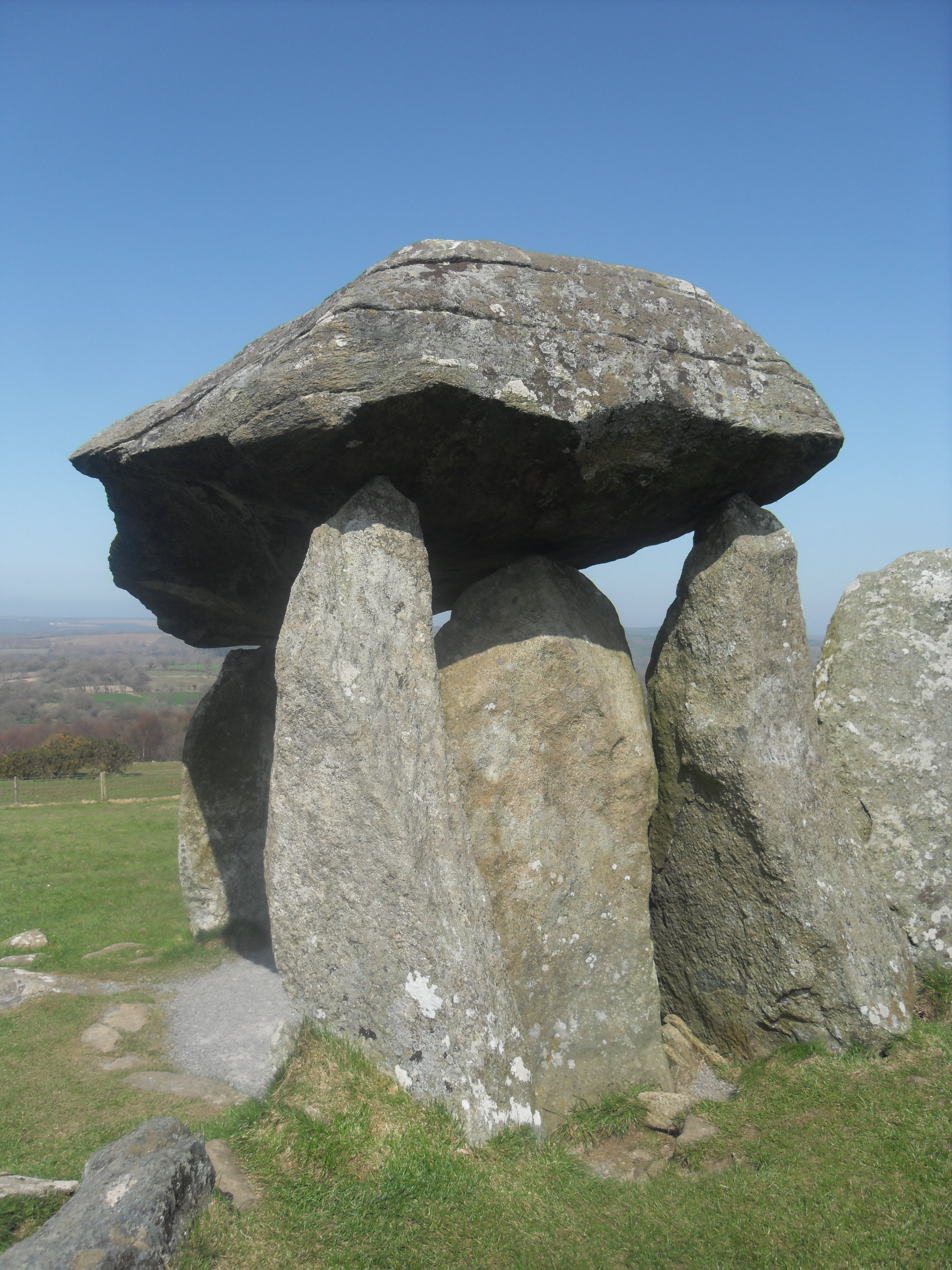
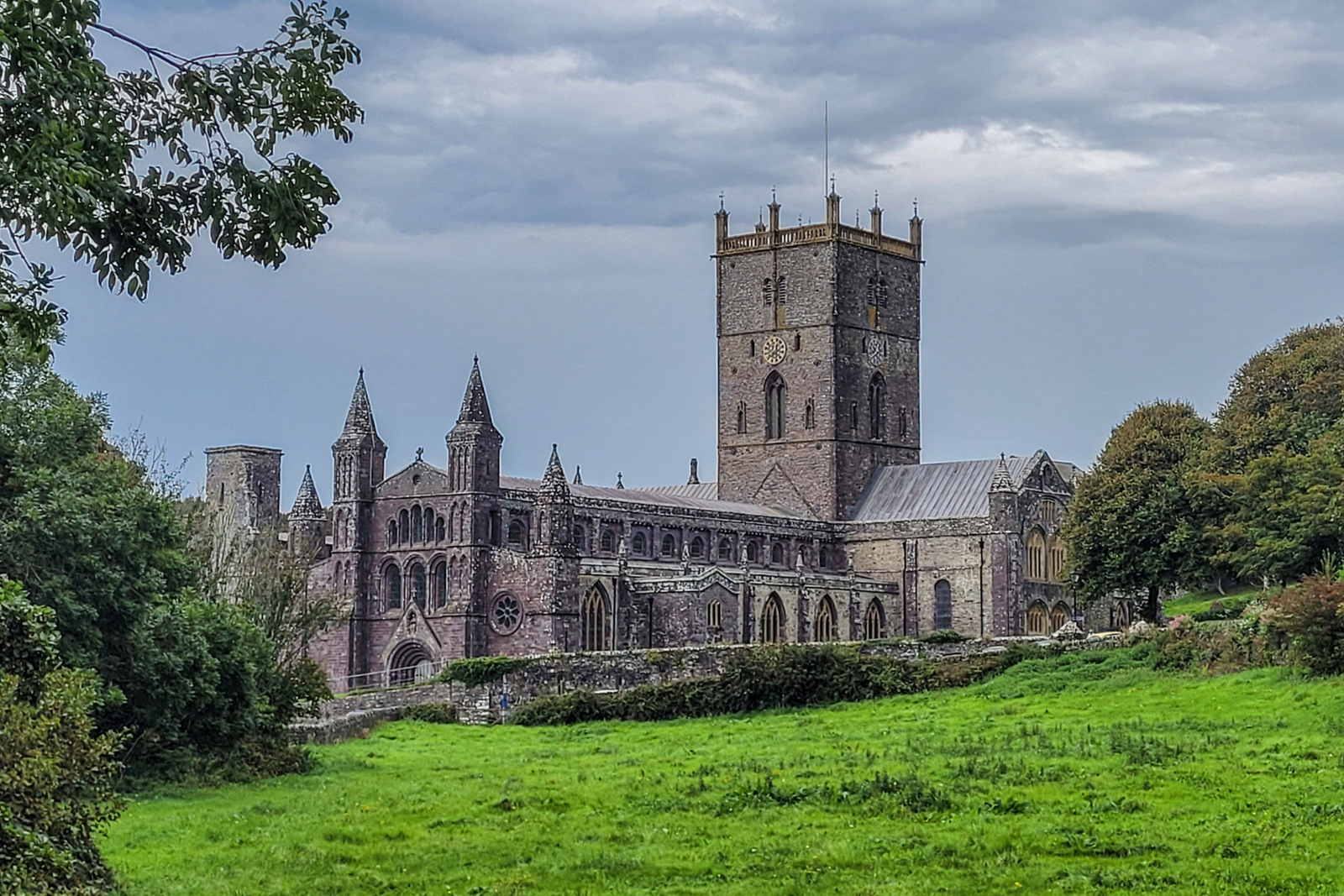
- Clockwise from top: Tenby; St Davids Cathedral; Pentre Ifan burial chamber

- Flag

- Pembrokeshire shown within Wales
- Coordinates: 51°50′42″N 4°50′32″W
- Sovereign state: United Kingdom
- Country: Wales
- Preserved county: Dyfed
- Incorporated: 1 April 1996
- Administrative HQ: Haverfordwest

Government
  - Type: Principal council
  - Body: Pembrokeshire County Council
  - Control: No overall control
  - MPs: 2 MPs: Ben Lake (PC); Henry Tufnell (L)
  - MSs: 6 in Ceredigion Penfro

Area
  - Total: 625 sq mi (1,618 km^{2})
  - Rank: 5th

Population (2025)
  - Total: 125,849
  - Rank: 13th
  - Density: 200/sq mi (78/km^{2})

Welsh language (2021)
  - Speakers: 17.2%
  - Rank: 8th
- Time zone: UTC+0 (GMT)
  - Summer (DST): UTC+1 (BST)
- ISO 3166 code: GB-PEM
- GSS code: W06000009
- Website: pembrokeshire.gov.uk

Pembrokeshire (/ˈpɛmbrʊkʃɪər, -ʃər/ PEM-bruuk-sheer, -shər; Welsh: Sir Benfro [siːr ˈbɛnvrɔ]) is a county in the south-west of Wales. It is bordered by Ceredigion to the north-east, Carmarthenshire to the east, and otherwise by the sea. (Note: Clockwise from Carmarthen Bay: Bristol Channel, Celtic Sea/Atlantic Ocean, St George's Channel/Irish Sea. There are no clearly-defined boundaries between these bodies of water.) Haverfordwest is the largest town and the administrative headquarters of Pembrokeshire County Council.

The county is generally sparsely populated and rural, with an area of 610 square miles (1,600 km^{2}) and an estimated population of 125,849 in 2025. Haverfordwest is near the centre of the county, the port of Fishguard in the north, the seaside resort of Tenby in the south-east. The city of St Davids, on a peninsula in the north-west, is the smallest city by population in the United Kingdom. Milford Haven, the large ria in the south of the county, gives its name to the town of Milford Haven on its north shore; Pembroke Dock is on the south shore, and Pembroke a short distance further inland. Welsh is spoken by 17.2 percent of the population; for historic reasons the language is more widely spoken in the north of the county than in the south. Pembrokeshire is part of the preserved county of Dyfed.

Pembrokeshire's coast is its most dramatic geographic feature, created by the complex geology of the area. It is a varied landscape which includes high sea cliffs, wide sandy beaches, Milford Haven, and offshore islands including Ramsey, Skomer, and Caldey which are home to seabird colonies. The interior of Pembrokeshire is relatively flat and gently undulating, with the exception of the Preseli Mountains in the north. Most of the coast, the Preselis, and the upper reaches of Milford Haven are protected by the Pembrokeshire Coast National Park. The coast can be walked using the 190-mile (310 km) Pembrokeshire Coast Path.

There are many prehistoric sites in Pembrokeshire, particularly in the Preseli Mountains. During the Middle Ages several castles were built by the Normans, such as Pembroke and Cilgerran, and St David's Cathedral became an important pilgrimage site. During the Industrial Revolution the county remained relatively rural, with the exception of Milford Haven, which was developed as a port and Royal Navy dockyard. It is now the UK's third-largest port, primarily because of its two liquefied natural gas terminals. The economy of the county is now focused on agriculture, oil and gas, and tourism.

== Settlements ==
See List of places in Pembrokeshire for a comprehensive list of settlements in Pembrokeshire.

The county town is Haverfordwest. Other towns include Pembroke, Pembroke Dock, Milford Haven, Fishguard, Tenby, Narberth, Neyland and Newport. In the west of the county, St Davids is the United Kingdom's smallest city in terms of both size and population (1,841 in 2011). Saundersfoot is the most populous village (more than 2,500 inhabitants) in Pembrokeshire. Less than 4 per cent of the county, according to CORINE, is built-on or green urban.

== Geography ==
=== Climate ===
Milford Haven

Climate chart (precipitation, max. and min. temperature)
J	F	M	A	M	J	J	A	S	O	N	D
115 9 3	90 8 3	87 10 4	61 12 5	52 15 7	67 17 10	53 20 12	93 19 12	102 17 10	131 14 8	130 11 5	126 10 5
- █ Average max. and min. temperatures in °C
- █ Precipitation totals in mm
- Source: The Met Office
Imperial conversion
J	F	M	A	M	J	J	A	S	O	N	D
4.5 47 38	3.5 46 37	3.4 49 39	2.4 54 41	2 59 45	2.6 63 50	2.1 68 54	3.7 66 54	4 63 50	5.2 57 46	5.1 52 42	5 49 41
- █ Average max. and min. temperatures in °F
- █ Precipitation totals in inches

There are three weather stations in Pembrokeshire: at Tenby, Milford Haven and Penycwm, all on the coast. Milford Haven enjoys a mild climate and Tenby shows a similar range of temperatures throughout the year, while at Penycwm, on the west coast and 100m above sea level, temperatures are slightly lower.

The county has on average the highest coastal winter temperatures in Wales due to its proximity to the relatively warm Atlantic Ocean. Inland, average temperatures tend to fall 0.5 °C for each 100 metres increase in height.

The air pollution rating of Pembrokeshire is "Good", the lowest rating.

=== Geology ===
The rocks in the county were formed between 600 and 290 million years ago. More recent rock formations were eroded when sea levels rose 80 million years ago, at the end of the Cretaceous Period. Around 60 million years ago, the Pembrokeshire landmass emerged through a combination of uplift and falling sea levels; the youngest rocks, from the Carboniferous Period, contain the Pembrokeshire Coalfield. The landscape was subject to considerable change as a result of ice ages; about 20,000 years ago the area was scraped clean of soil and vegetation by the ice sheet; subsequently, meltwater deepened the existing river valleys. While Pembrokeshire is not usually a seismically active area, in August 1892 there was a series of pronounced activities (maximum intensity: 7) over a six-day period.

=== Coastline and landscape ===
Pembrokeshire Coast National Park shown in green

The Pembrokeshire coastline includes numerous bays and sandy beaches. The Pembrokeshire Coast National Park, the only park in the UK established primarily because of its coastline, occupies more than a third of the county. The park contains the Pembrokeshire Coast Path, a near-continuous 186-mile (299 km) long-distance trail from Amroth, by the Carmarthenshire border in the southeast, to St Dogmaels just down the River Teifi estuary from Cardigan, Ceredigion, in the north. The National Trust owns 60 miles (97 km) of Pembrokeshire's coast. Nowhere in the county is more than 10 miles (16 km) from tidal water. The large estuary and natural harbour of Milford Haven cuts deep into the coast; this inlet is formed by the confluence of the Western Cleddau (which flows through Haverfordwest), the Eastern Cleddau, and rivers Cresswell and Carew. Since 1975, the estuary has been bridged by the Cleddau Bridge, a toll bridge carrying the A477 between Neyland and Pembroke Dock. Large bays are Newport Bay, Fishguard Bay, St Bride's Bay and western Carmarthen Bay. There are several small islands off the Pembrokeshire coast, the largest of which are Ramsey, Grassholm, Skokholm, Skomer and Caldey. The seas around Skomer and Skokholm, and some other areas off the Pembrokeshire coast are Marine protected areas.

There are many known shipwrecks off the Pembrokeshire coast with many more undiscovered. A Viking wreck off The Smalls has protected status. The county has five lifeboat stations, the earliest of which, at Fishguard, was established in 1822; in 2015 a quarter of all Royal National Lifeboat Institution Welsh rescues took place off the Pembrokeshire coast.

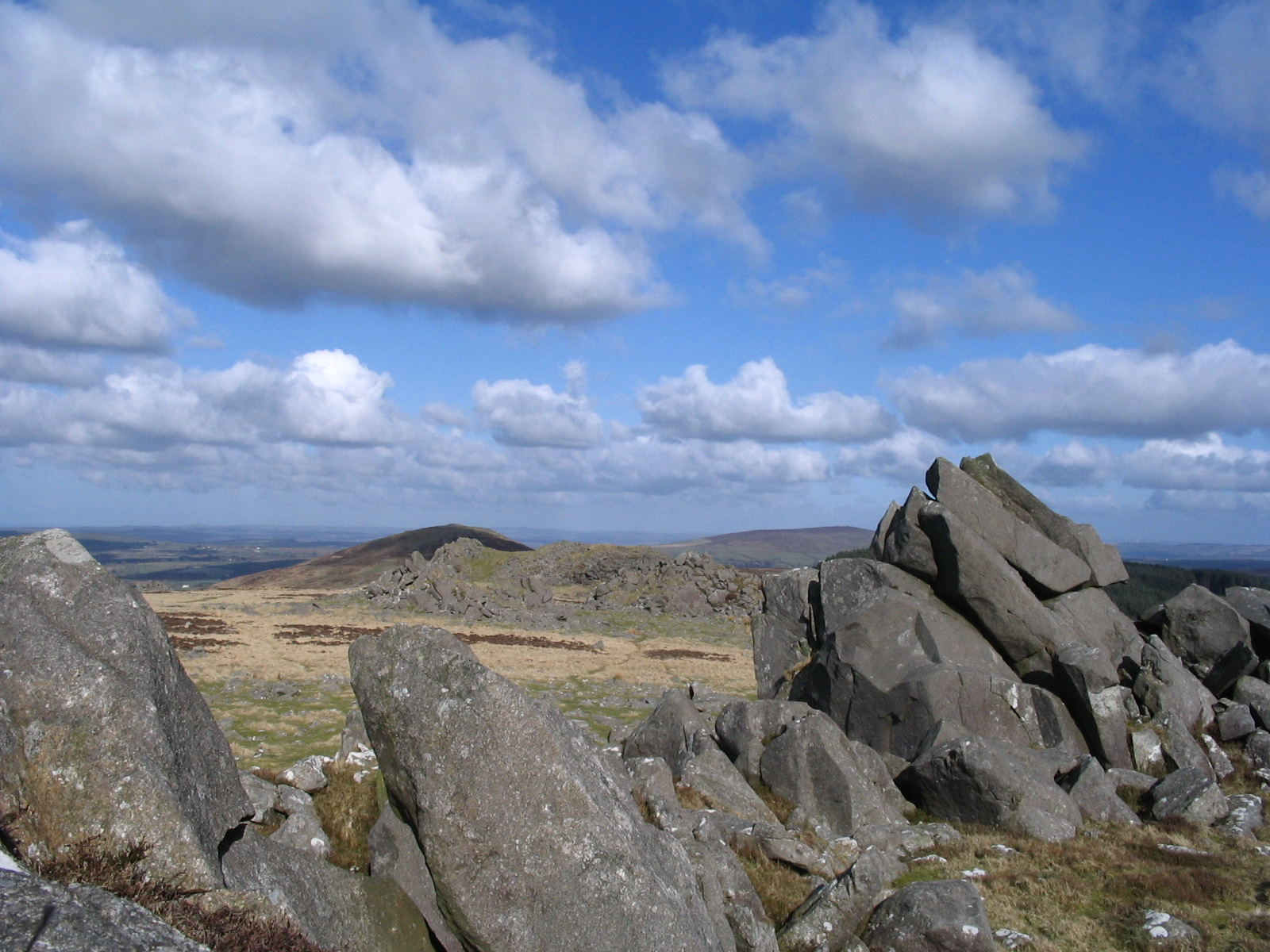
View from the bluestone quarry to other peaks in the Preselis

Pembrokeshire's diverse range of geological features was a key factor in the establishment of the Pembrokeshire Coast National Park and a number of sites of special scientific interest (SSSIs). In the north of the county are the Preseli Mountains, a wide stretch of high moorland supporting sheep farming and some forestry, with many prehistoric sites and the probable source of the bluestones used in the construction of the inner circle of Stonehenge in England. The highest point is Foel Cwmcerwyn at 1,759 feet (536 m), which is also the highest point in Pembrokeshire. Elsewhere in the county most of the land (86 per cent according to CORINE) is used for farming, compared with 60 per cent for Wales as a whole.

=== Biodiversity ===
Pembrokeshire's wildlife is diverse, with marine, estuary, woodland, moorland and farmland habitats. The county has a number of seasonal seabird breeding sites, including for razorbill, guillemot and Manx shearwater, and rare endemic species such as the red-billed chough; Grassholm has a large gannet colony, and the island of Skomer is one of the most important puffin colonies in Britain with more than 43,000 birds. Seals, several species of whales (including rare humpback whale and fin whale sightings), dolphins and porpoises can be seen off the Pembrokeshire coast; whale-watching boat trips are frequent, particularly during the summer months, and a rare visit by a walrus occurred in the spring of 2021. An appeal for otter sightings in 2014 yielded more than 100 responses.

Pembrokeshire is one of the few places in the UK that is home to the rare Southern damselfly, Coenagrion mercuriale, which is found at several locations in the county, and whose numbers have been boosted by conservation work over a number of years.

Ancient woodland still exists, such as Tŷ Canol Wood, where biofluorescence, seen under ultraviolet light under the dark sky, is a feature that has led to the wood being described as "...one of the most magical and special woodlands in the UK."

The Wildlife Trust of South and West Wales is in the process of restoring a lost temperate rainforest, also known as a Celtic forest, in Trellwyn Fach, near the town of Fishguard. Although temperate rainforests once covered much of western Britain's coasts, they were destroyed over centuries and only remain in fragments. The 59-hectare (150-acre) site will connect with remnants of the remaining rainforest in the Gwaun valley. The project is part of a larger, 100-year Atlantic rainforest recovery programme.

== History ==
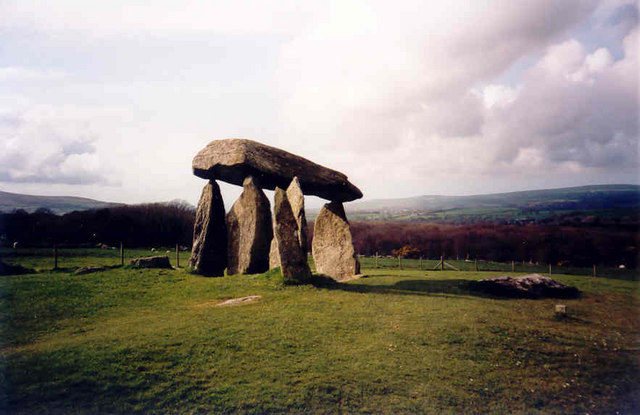
Pentre Ifan neolithic burial chamber

Human habitation in what is now Pembrokeshire dates back to between 125,000 and 70,000 years ago, with prominent prehistoric sites including Pentre Ifan and other Neolithic remains. Aerial surveys during the 2018 heatwave revealed many previously unrecorded sites, and in the same year, Wales's first known Celtic chariot burial was discovered in Llanstadwell. Roman influence was limited; although a few forts, coins, and roads have been found, much of the area remained beyond sustained Roman control. In the sub-Roman period, the Irish Déisi settled and merged with local populations, forming the Kingdom of Dyfed, which became part of Deheubarth in the 10th century. The region saw Viking raids and limited settlement.

Normans and Flemings arrived between 1067 and 1111, building castles such as Pembroke Castle and transforming Dyfed into the county of Pembroke. Although Norman control was contested by Welsh rulers including The Lord Rhys and Llywelyn the Great, it endured in many parts of the region. Pembrokeshire was declared a county palatine in 1138 and saw a wave of Flemish settlement. In 1485, Henry Tudor had launched his campaign from Pembroke, ultimately becoming Henry VII of England. The Laws in Wales Acts 1535 and 1542 later reorganised it into seven hundreds, aligning it with the English shire system. The county supported Parliament in the English Civil Wars, with Oliver Cromwell besieging Pembroke in 1648 following a local mutiny.

In the 18th and 19th centuries, Pembrokeshire remained largely agricultural, with modest urban centres and limited industrial growth. The Battle of Fishguard in 1797 marked the last invasion of Britain, ending in French surrender. Poor relief and infrastructure remained key concerns, with water supply improved only later in the century. In the 20th century, military use of the county intensified, particularly during the world wars: a naval base at Milford Haven, multiple airfields, D-Day training by U.S. forces, and accommodation of German POWs all featured. Pembrokeshire's wartime casualties are commemorated at the County of Pembroke War Memorial. After 1945, modern development included the construction of the Llys y Fran reservoir (1972), with the local economy later benefiting from tourism, agriculture, and energy infrastructure.

In February 1996, the Pembrokeshire coast suffered the UK's (then) third worst oil spill when the Sea Empress ran aground at the entrance to Milford Haven.

== Demography ==
Proportion of Welsh speakers (Wales 2011 census) in Pembrokeshire (county border shown by white line)

=== Population ===
Pembrokeshire's population was 122,439 at the 2011 census, increasing marginally to 123,400 at the 2021 census. 66.4 per cent of residents were born in Wales, while 27.5 per cent were born in England.

=== Language ===
The 2021 census recorded that Welsh is spoken by 17.2 per cent of the population, a fall from 19.2 per cent in 2011. As a result of differential immigration over hundreds of years, such as the influx of Flemish people, the south of the county has fewer Welsh-speaking inhabitants (about 15 per cent) than the north (about 50 per cent). The rough line that can be drawn between the two regions, illustrated by the map, is known as the Landsker Line, and the area south of the line has been termed "Little England beyond Wales". The first objective, statistically based description of this demarcation was made in the 1960s, but the distinction was remarked upon as early as 1603 by George Owen of Henllys. A 21st century introduction of Welsh place names for villages which had previously been known locally only by their English names has caused some controversy.

=== Religion ===
In 1851, a religious census of Pembrokeshire showed that of 70 per cent of the population, 53 per cent were nonconformists and 17 per cent Church of England (now Church in Wales, in the Diocese of St Davids). The 2001 census for Preseli Pembrokeshire constituency showed that 74 per cent were Christian and 25 per cent of no religion (or not stated), with other religions totalling less than 1 per cent. This approximated to the figures for the whole of Wales. By 2021, 43 per cent reported "no religion", while 48.8 per cent described themselves as Christian. 6.6 per cent did not state their religion, and the remainder represented a number of other religions combined.

=== Ethnicity ===
In 2001, Preseli Pembrokeshire constituency was 99 per cent white European, marginally lower than in 1991, compared with 98 per cent for the whole of Wales. 71 per cent identified their place of birth as Wales and 26 per cent as from elsewhere in the UK. In 2021, 52.7 per cent of residents identified as "Welsh only", a slight decrease since 2011.

== Governance, politics and public services ==
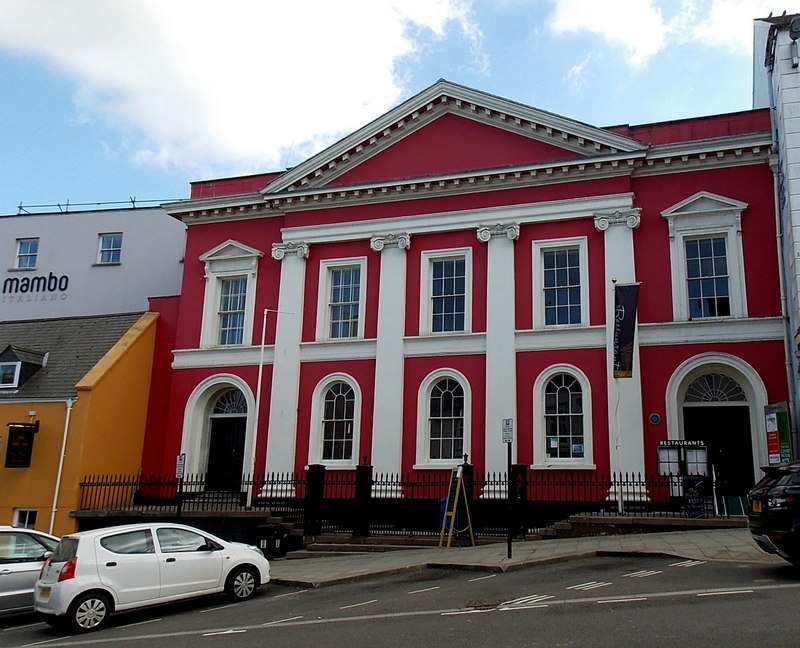
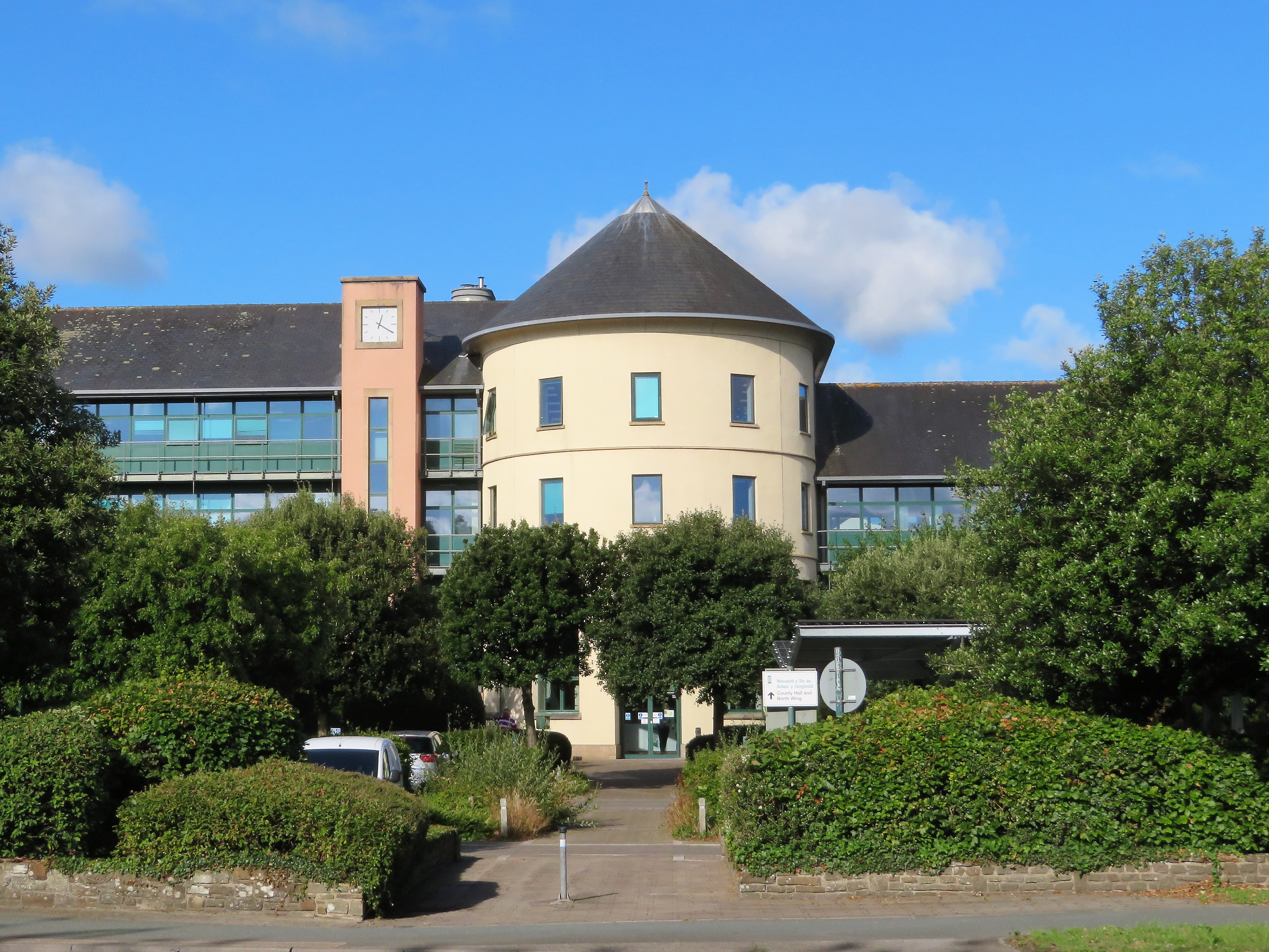
The Shire Hall, Haverfordwest (left) and County Hall, Haverfordwest (right).

Under the Local Government Act 1888, an elected county council was set up to take over the functions of the Pembrokeshire Quarter Sessions. It was based at the Shire Hall, Haverfordwest. This and the administrative county of Pembrokeshire were abolished under the Local Government Act 1972, with Pembrokeshire forming two districts of the new county of Dyfed: South Pembrokeshire and Preseli – the split being made at the request of local authorities in the area. Under the same Act, civil parishes were replaced by communities across the whole of Wales. In 1996, under the Local Government (Wales) Act 1994, the county of Dyfed was broken up into its constituent parts, and Pembrokeshire has been a unitary authority since then. A new County Hall was built in 1999 in Haverfordwest and serves as the county council's headquarters. In 2017 Pembrokeshire County Council had 60 members and no political party in overall control; there were 34 independent councillors.

In 2009, the question of county names and Royal Mail postal addresses was raised in the Westminster parliament; it was argued that Royal Mail's continued use of the county address Dyfed was causing concern and confusion in the Pembrokeshire business community. The Royal Mail subsequently ceased requiring county names to be used in postal addresses.

In 2018, Pembrokeshire County Council increased council tax by 12.5 per cent, the largest increase since 2004, but the county's council tax remains the lowest in Wales. In 2023 the council published its corporate strategy document for 2023-28.

The Pembrokeshire (Communities) Order 2011 established the most recent arrangement of communities (the successors to civil parishes) in the county which have their own councils; see the foot of this page for a list of communities.

From 2010 to 2024, Pembrokeshire returned two Conservative MPs to the Parliament of the United Kingdom at Westminster: Stephen Crabb for Preseli Pembrokeshire and Simon Hart for South Pembrokeshire which is represented jointly with West Carmarthenshire. The corresponding Members of the Senedd (MSs) returned to the Senedd (Welsh Parliament) in Cardiff until 2026 were Paul Davies and Samuel Kurtz respectively, both Conservatives.

The two UK parliament constituencies covering Pembrokeshire (in pink) from 2024. 1 = Mid and South Pembrokeshire, 2 = Ceredigion Preseli.

Since 2024, Pembrokeshire is represented by the new UK Parliament constituencies Ceredigion Preseli and Mid and South Pembrokeshire which, in the 2024 General Election, returned Ben Lake (Plaid Cymru) and Henry Tufnell (Labour) respectively. Since 2026, the county is part of the Ceredigion Penfro Senedd constituency together with the county of Ceredigion to the north, with the constituency having elected three MSs for Plaid Cymru, two for Reform UK and one Conservative.

Pembrokeshire is served by the Mid and West Wales Fire and Rescue Service and Dyfed-Powys Police.

== Transport ==
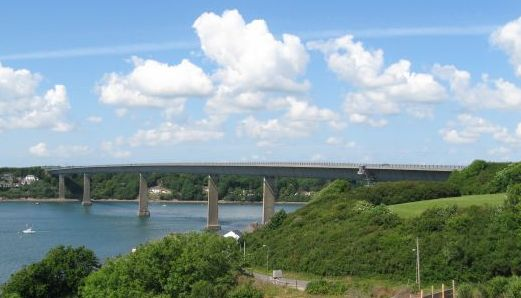
Cleddau Bridge

There are no motorways in Pembrokeshire; the nearest is the M4 motorway from London which terminates at the Pont Abraham services in Carmarthenshire some 46 miles (74 km) from Haverfordwest. The A40 crosses Pembrokeshire from the border with Carmarthenshire westwards to Haverfordwest, then northwards to Fishguard. The A477 from St. Clears to Pembroke Dock is 24 miles (39 km) long, of which only 2 miles (3.2 km) are dual carriageway. The Cleddau Bridge, toll-free from 28 March 2019, carries the A477 across the Cleddau Estuary. The A478 traverses eastern Pembrokeshire from Tenby in the south to Cardigan, Ceredigion in the north, a distance of 30 miles (48 km). The A487 is the other major route, running northwest from Haverfordwest to St Davids, then northeast following the coast, through Fishguard and Newport, to the boundary with Ceredigion at Cardigan. Owing to length restrictions in Fishguard, some freight vehicles are not permitted to travel northeast from Fishguard but must take a longer route via Haverfordwest and Narberth. The B4329 former turnpike runs from Eglwyswrw in the north to Haverfordwest across the Preselis.

The main towns in the county are covered by regular bus and train services operated by First Cymru (under their "Western Welsh" livery), Transport for Wales Rail and sometimes Great Western Railway respectively, and many villages by local bus services, or community or education transport.

Pembrokeshire is served by rail via the West Wales Lines from Swansea. Direct trains from Milford Haven run to Manchester Piccadilly. Branch lines terminate at Pembroke Dock, Milford Haven and Fishguard, linking with ferries to Ireland from Pembroke Dock and Fishguard. Seasonal ferry services operate from Tenby to Caldey Island, from St Justinians (St Davids) to Ramsey Island and Grassholm Island, and from Martin's Haven to Skomer Island. Haverfordwest (Withybush) Airport provides general aviation services.

== Economy ==
Pembrokeshire's economy now relies heavily on tourism; agriculture, once its most important industry with associated activities such as milling, is still significant. Mining of slate and coal had largely ceased by the 20th century. Since the 1950s, petrochemical and liquid natural gas industries have developed along the Milford Haven Waterway and the county has attracted other major ventures. In 2016, Stephen Crabb, then Welsh Secretary, commented in a government press release: "...with a buoyant local economy, Pembrokeshire is punching above its weight across the UK."

In August 2019, the Pembrokeshire County Show celebrated 60 years at Haverfordwest Showground. The organisers anticipated 100,000 visitors, the largest three-day such event in Wales at the time. It showcased agriculture, food and drink, a rugby club, entertainment, with the star attraction a motorcycle display team.

=== Agriculture ===
Until the 12th century, a great extent of Pembrokeshire was virgin woodland. Clearance in the lowland south began under Anglo-Flemish colonisation and under mediaeval tenancies in other areas. Such was the extent of development that by the 16th century there was a shortage of timber in the county. Little is known about mediaeval farming methods, but much arable land was continuously cropped and only occasionally ploughed. By the 18th century, many of the centuries-old open field systems had been enclosed, and much of the land was arable or rough pasture in a ratio of about 1:3.

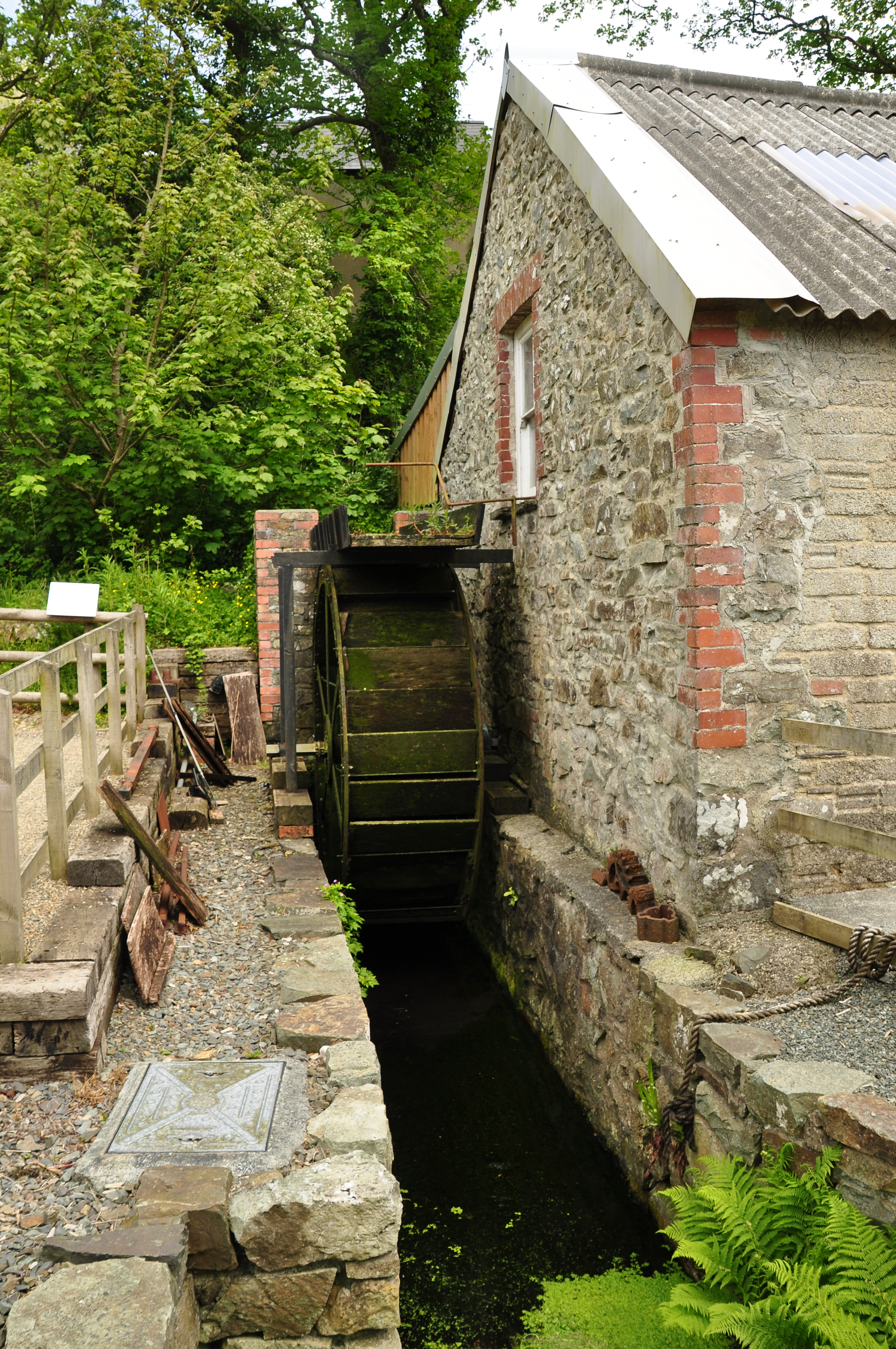
Solva Woollen Mill

Kelly's Directory of 1910 gave a snapshot of the agriculture of Pembrokeshire: 57,343 acres (23,206 ha) were cropped (almost half under oats and a quarter barley), there were 37,535 acres (15,190 ha) of grass and clover and 213,387 acres (86,355 ha) of permanent pasture (of which a third was for hay). There were 128,865 acres (52,150 ha) of mountain or heathland used for grazing, with 10,000 acres (4,000 ha) of managed or unmanaged woodland. Estimates of livestock included 17,810 horses, 92,386 cattle, 157,973 sheep and 31,673 pigs. Of 5,981 agricultural holdings, more than half were between 5 and 50 acres.

Pembrokeshire had a flourishing wool industry. There are still working woollen mills at Solva and Tregwynt. One of the last few watermills in Wales producing flour is in St Dogmaels.

Pembrokeshire has good soil and benefits from the Gulf Stream, which provides a mild climate and a longer growing season than other parts of Wales. Pembrokeshire's mild climate means that crops such as its new potatoes (which have protected geographical status under European law) often arrive in British shops earlier in the year than produce from other parts of the UK. Other principal arable crops are oilseed rape, wheat and barley, while the main non-arable activities are dairy farming for milk and cheese, beef production and sheep farming.

The county lends its name to the Pembroke Welsh Corgi, a herding dog whose lineage can be traced back to the 12th century, but which in 2015 was designated as a "vulnerable" breed.

Since 2006, Pembrokeshire Local Action Network for Enterprise and Development (PLANED) has provided a forum to promote an integrated approach to rural development, in which communities, public sector and voluntary partners and specialist interest groups come together to influence policy and promote projects aimed at sustainable agriculture. Sub-groups include promoting food and farming in schools and shortening supply chains.

=== Fishing ===
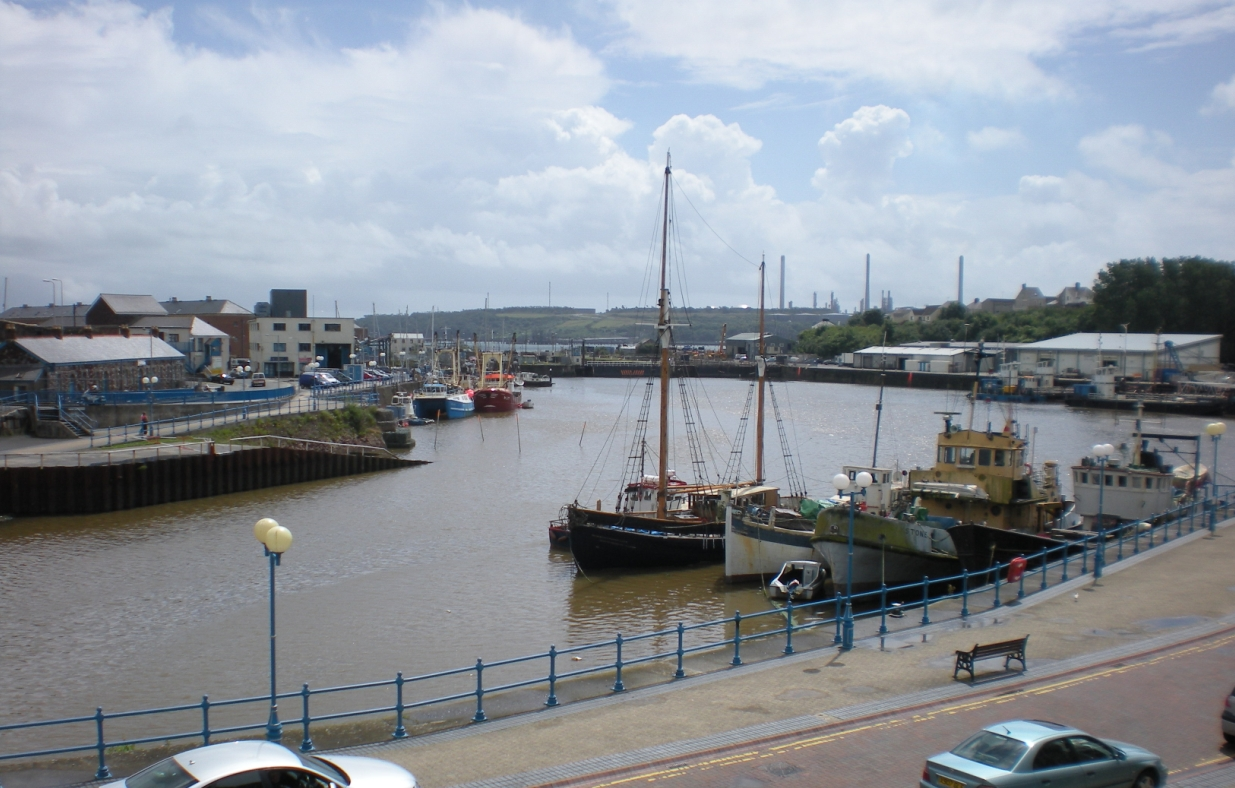
Milford Haven dock, 2009

With Pembrokeshire's extensive coastal areas and tidal river estuaries, fishing was an important industry at least from the 16th century. Many ports and villages were dependent on the fishing. The former large sea fishing industry around Milford Haven is now greatly reduced, although limited commercial fishing still takes place. At its peak, Milford was landing over 40,000 tons of fish a year. Pembrokeshire Fish Week is a biennial event which in 2014 attracted 31,000 visitors and generated £3 million for the local economy.

=== Mining ===
Slate quarrying was a significant industry in the 19th and early 20th centuries with quarrying taking place at about 100 locations throughout the county. Over 50 coal workings in the Pembrokeshire Coalfield were in existence between the 14th and 20th centuries, with the last coal mine, at Kilgetty, closing in 1950. Pembrokeshire has 61 disused coal tips; only one of these is in Category C (carrying a potential safety risk), but its location has not been disclosed.

=== Oil, gas and renewable energy ===
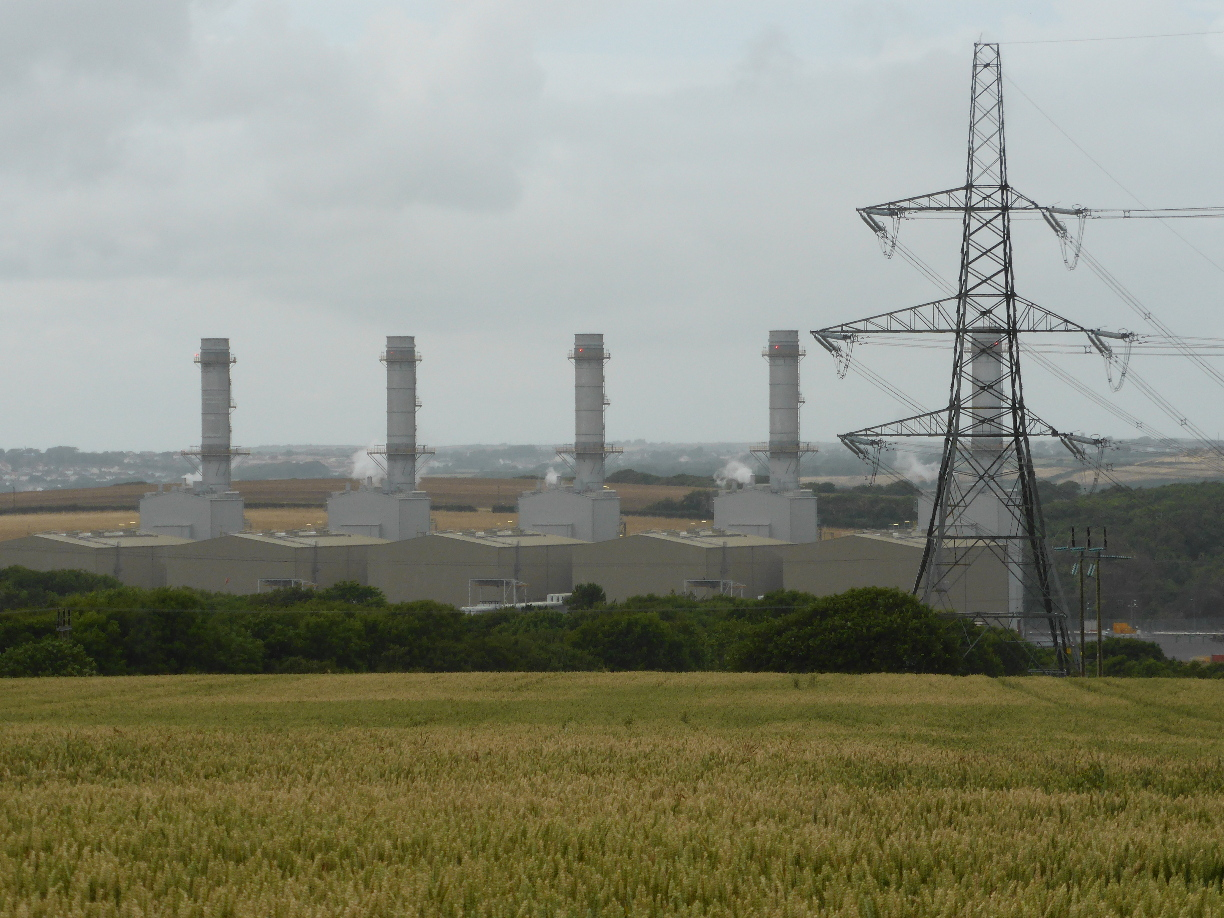
Pembroke Power Station in 2013

There are two oil refineries, two liquified natural gas (LNG) terminals and the 2,000 MW gas-fired Pembroke Power Station (opened in 2012) at Milford Haven. The LNG terminals on the north side of the river, just outside Milford Haven were opened in 2008; a 196-mile (315 km) pipeline connecting Milford Haven to Tirley in Gloucestershire was completed in 2007. The two oil refineries are operated by Chevron (formerly Texaco) producing 214,000 bbl/d (34,000 m^{3}/d) and Murco (formerly Amoco/Elf) producing 108,000 bbl/d (17,200 m^{3}/d); the latter was sold to Puma Energy in 2015 with the intention of converting it to a storage facility. At the peak, there were a total of five refineries served from around the Haven: the Esso refinery operated from 1960 to 1983, was demolished in the late 1980s and the site converted into the South Hook LNG terminal; the Gulf Refinery operated from 1968 to 1997 and the site now incorporates the Dragon LNG terminal; BP had an oil terminal at Angle Bay which served its refinery at Llandarcy and operated between 1961 and 1985.

The Pembrokeshire Coast National Park Authority has identified a number of areas in which renewable energy can be, and has been, generated in the county. Following several years of planning after the initial impact studies begun in 2011, the first submarine turbine of three was installed in Ramsey Sound in December 2015. The cumulative impact of single and multiple wind turbines is not without controversy and was the subject of a comprehensive assessment in 2013. In 2011 the first solar energy farm in Wales was installed at Rhosygilwen, Rhoshill with 10,000 panels in a field of 6 acres (2.4 ha), generating 1 MW.

=== Tourism ===
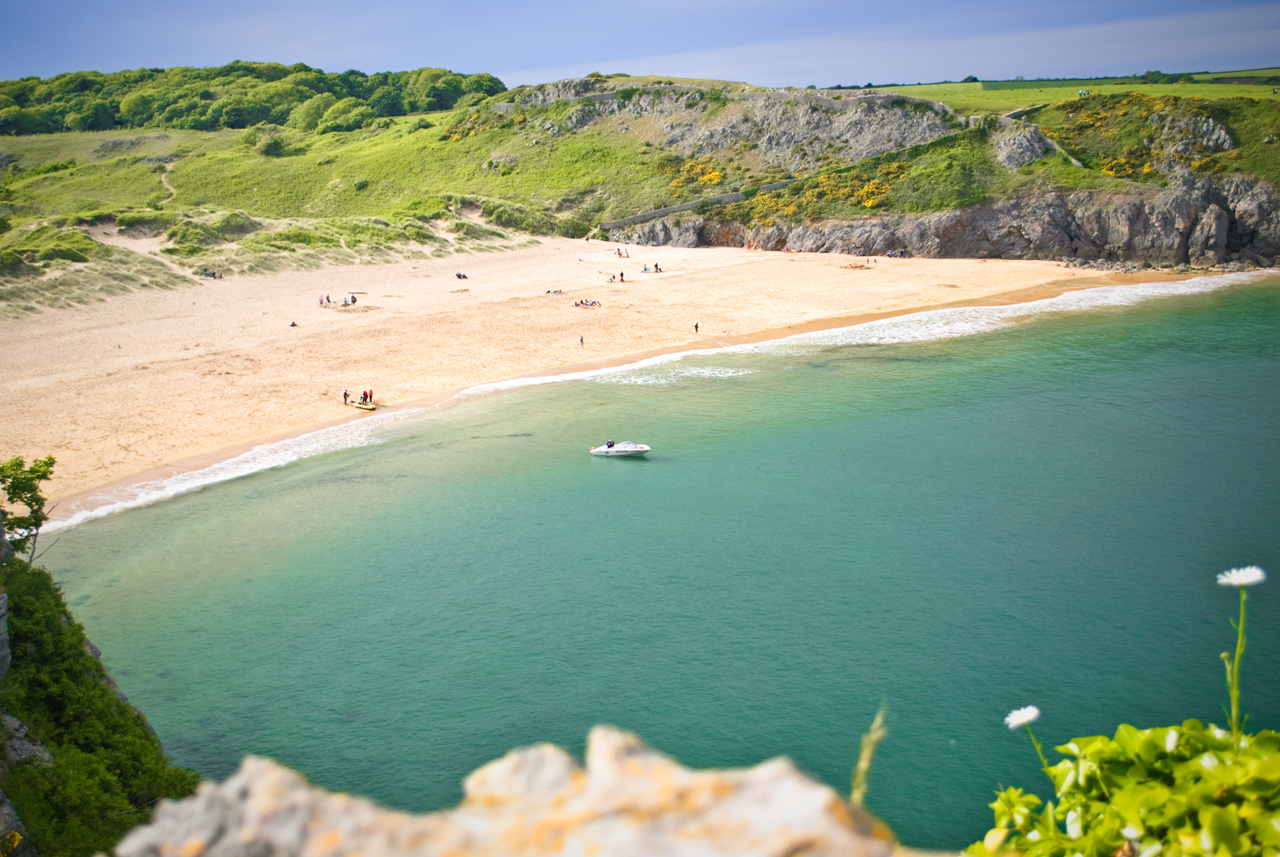
Barafundle Beach, a recipient of both the 2019 Seaside and Green Coastal awards

Pembrokeshire's tourism portal is Visit Pembrokeshire, run by Pembrokeshire County Council. In 2015 4.3 million tourists visited the county, staying for an average of 5.24 days, spending £585 million; the tourism industry supported 11,834 jobs. Many of Pembrokeshire's beaches have won awards, including Poppit Sands and Newport Sands. In 2018, Pembrokeshire received the most coast awards in Wales, with 56 Blue Flag, Green Coast or Seaside Awards. In the 2019 Wales Coast Awards, 39 Pembrokeshire beaches were recognised, including 11 awarded Blue Flag status.

The Pembrokeshire coastline is a major draw to tourists; in 2011 National Geographic Traveller magazine voted the Pembrokeshire Coast the second best in the world and in 2015 the Pembrokeshire Coast National Park was listed among the top five parks in the world by a travel writer for the Huffington Post. Countryfile Magazine readers voted the Pembrokeshire Coast the top UK holiday destination in 2018, and in 2019 Consumers' Association members placed Tenby and St Davids in the top three best value beach destinations in Britain. With few large urban areas, Pembrokeshire is a "dark sky" destination. The many wrecks off the Pembrokeshire coast attract divers. The decade from 2012 saw significant, increasing numbers of Atlantic bluefin tuna, not seen since the 1960s, and now seen by some as an opportunity to encourage tourist sport fishing.

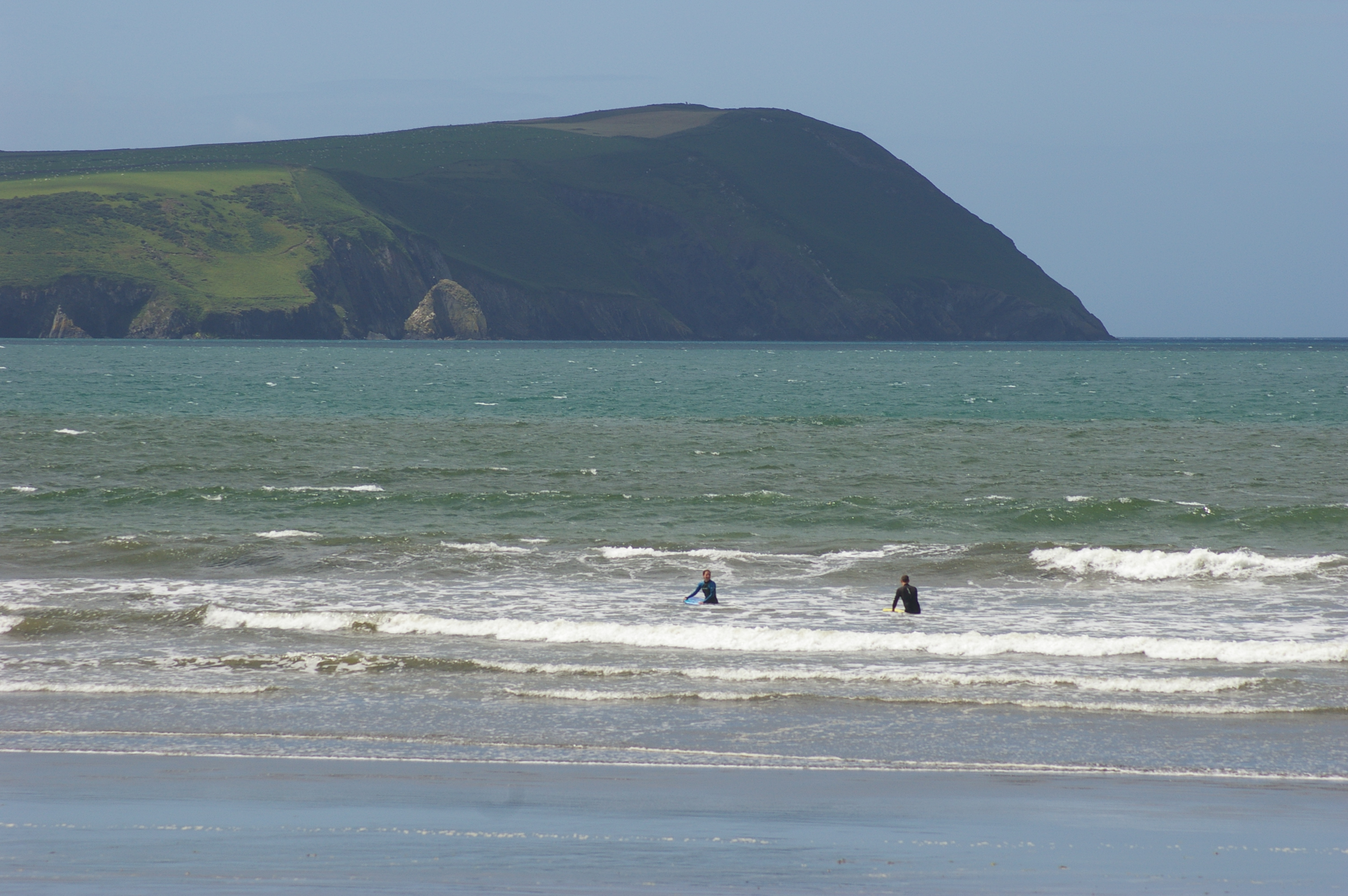
People surfing at a beach in Pembrokeshire

The county has a number of theme and animal parks (examples are Folly Farm Adventure Park and Zoo, Manor House Wildlife Park and Blue Lagoon Water Park), museums and other visitor attractions including Castell Henllys reconstructed Iron Age fort, Tenby Lifeboat Station and Milford Haven's Torch Theatre. There are 21 marked cycle trails around the county.

Pembrokeshire Destination Management Plan for 2020 to 2025 sets out the scope and priorities to grow tourism in Pembrokeshire by increasing its value by 10 per cent in the five years, and to make Pembrokeshire a top five UK destination.

== Culture ==
=== Flag ===
The flag of Pembrokeshire is a yellow cross on a blue field; in the centre of the cross is a green pentagon bearing a red and white Tudor rose, divided quarterly and counterchanged, the inner and outer roses having alternating red and white quarters.

=== Physical heritage ===
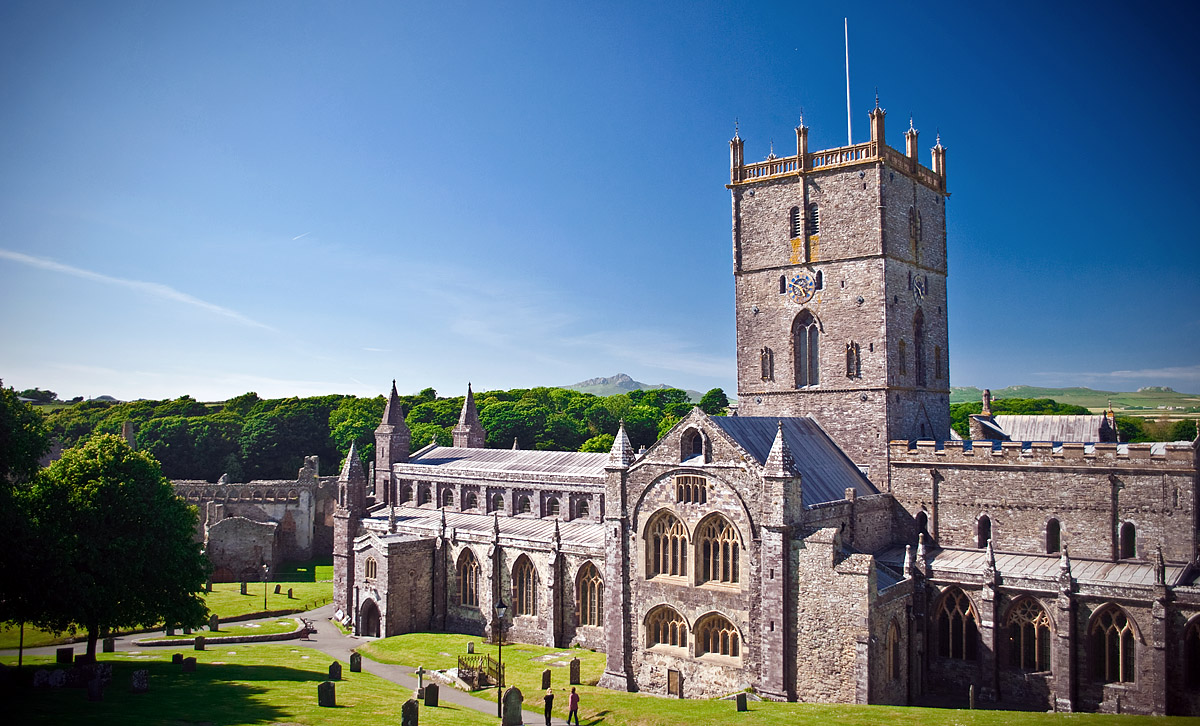
St Davids Cathedral with the Bishops Palace ruins beyond

Pembrokeshire has more than 1,600 listed buildings, ranging from mud huts to castles, and including bridges and other ancient and modern structures, under the auspices of Cadw and the County Council. The National Monuments Record of Wales of the Royal Commission on the Ancient and Historical Monuments of Wales identifies nearly 6,000 sites in Pembrokeshire as worthy of study, preservation and recording, including prehistoric and modern buildings, wrecks and natural features. There are 10 National Trust properties in Pembrokeshire.

=== The arts and media ===
Music festivals in Pembrokeshire include those at St Davids, Fishguard (folk, jazz and the International Music Festival) and Tenby (Blues Festival). Milford Haven's Torch Theatre produces drama, screens films and holds exhibitions of art and crafts, and there is a theatre-cinema in Fishguard (Theatr Gwaun) and a cinema in Haverfordwest. There are museums and art galleries in several locations in the county, including Scolton Manor, Narberth, Tenby, Milford Haven and Fishguard; in Fishguard, the 100 feet (30 m) long Last Invasion Tapestry, commemorating the Battle of Fishguard in 1797, is on display. The Llangwm Literary Festival is a literary festival held in Llangwm.

Pembrokeshire's coastal landscape and wealth of historic buildings has made it a popular location choice for film and television, including Moby Dick at Fishguard, and the final two Harry Potter films at Freshwater West. Others include:

Year	Film title	Location	Ref.
1940	The Thief of Bagdad	Freshwater West	
1956	Moby Dick	Fishguard	
1961	Fury at Smugglers' Bay	Abereiddy	
1968	The Lion in Winter	Pembroke Castle, Marloes Sands, Milford Haven	
1972	Under Milk Wood	Fishguard	
1977	Jabberwocky	Pembroke Castle & Bosherston	
1994	Dragonworld	Manorbier	
1994	The Lifeboat (BBC TV)	Pembrokeshire Coast	
1998	Basil	Tenby, Manorbier, Bosherston	
2003	Baltic Storm	Fishguard	
2003	I Capture The Castle	Manorbier Castle	
2008	The Edge of Love	Tenby & Laugharne	
2010	Harry Potter and the Deathly Hallows – Part 1	Freshwater West	
2010	Robin Hood	Freshwater West	
2010	Third Star	Barafundle Bay, Stackpole Estate	
2011	Harry Potter and the Deathly Hallows – Part 2	Freshwater West	
2012	Snow White and the Huntsman	Marloes Sands	
2015	Under Milk Wood	Solva	
2015	The Bad Education Movie	Pembroke Castle	
2016	Their Finest	Trecwn, Haverfordwest, Cresswell Quay, Freshwater West, Porthgain	
2016	Me Before You	Pembroke, Pembroke Castle	
2020	The Pembrokeshire Murders (TV series)	Goodwick, Fishguard, Freshwater East, coast path	
2021	The Toll	Dale, Preseli Mountains, Rosebush, Scolton Manor	

There are seven local newspapers based in Pembrokeshire: the Western Telegraph (the largest in Pembrokeshire), The Milford Mercury, Tenby Observer, Pembroke Observer, County Echo and The Pembrokeshire Herald (founded 2013. The Milford Mercury (circulation 3,681) and Western Telegraph (circulation 19,582) are part of the Newsquest group. Radio Pembrokeshire, and several other West Wales radio stations, were broadcast from Narberth until 2016, when they were relocated to the Vale of Glamorgan, while retaining satellite offices at Narberth and Milford Marina.

=== Sport ===
As the national sport of Wales, rugby union is widely played throughout the county at both town and village level. Haverfordwest RFC, founded in 1875, is a feeder club for Llanelli Scarlets. Village team Crymych RFC in 2014 plays in WRU Division One West. There are numerous football clubs in the county, playing in five leagues with Haverfordwest County A.F.C. competing in the Cymru Premier.

Triathlon event Ironman Wales has been held in Pembrokeshire since 2011, contributing £3.7 million to the local economy, and the county committed in 2017 to host the event for a further five years. Ras Beca, a mixed road, fell and cross country race attracting UK-wide competitors, has been held in the Preselis annually since 1977. The record of 32 minutes 5 seconds has stood since 1995. Pembrokeshire Harriers athletics club was formed in 2001 by the amalgamation of Cleddau Athletic Club (established 1970) and Preseli Harriers (1989) and is based in Haverfordwest.

The annual Tour of Pembrokeshire road-cycling event takes place over routes of optional length. The 4th Tour, in April 2015, attracted 1,600 riders including Olympic gold medallist Chris Boardman and there were 1,500 entrants to the 2016 event. Part of Route 47 of the Celtic Trail cycle route is in Pembrokeshire. The Llys y Fran Hillclimb is an annual event run by Swansea Motor Club, and there are several other county motoring events held each year.

Abereiddy's Blue Lagoon was the venue for a round of the Red Bull Cliff Diving World Series in 2012, 2013, and 2016; the Welsh Surfing Federation has held the Welsh National Surfing Championships at Freshwater West for several years, and Llys y Fran Country Park hosted the Welsh Dragonboat Championships from 2014 to 2017.

While not at major league level, cricket is played throughout the county and many villages such as Lamphey, Creselly, Llangwm, Llechryd and Crymych field teams in minor leagues under the umbrella of the Cricket Board of Wales.

== Notable people ==
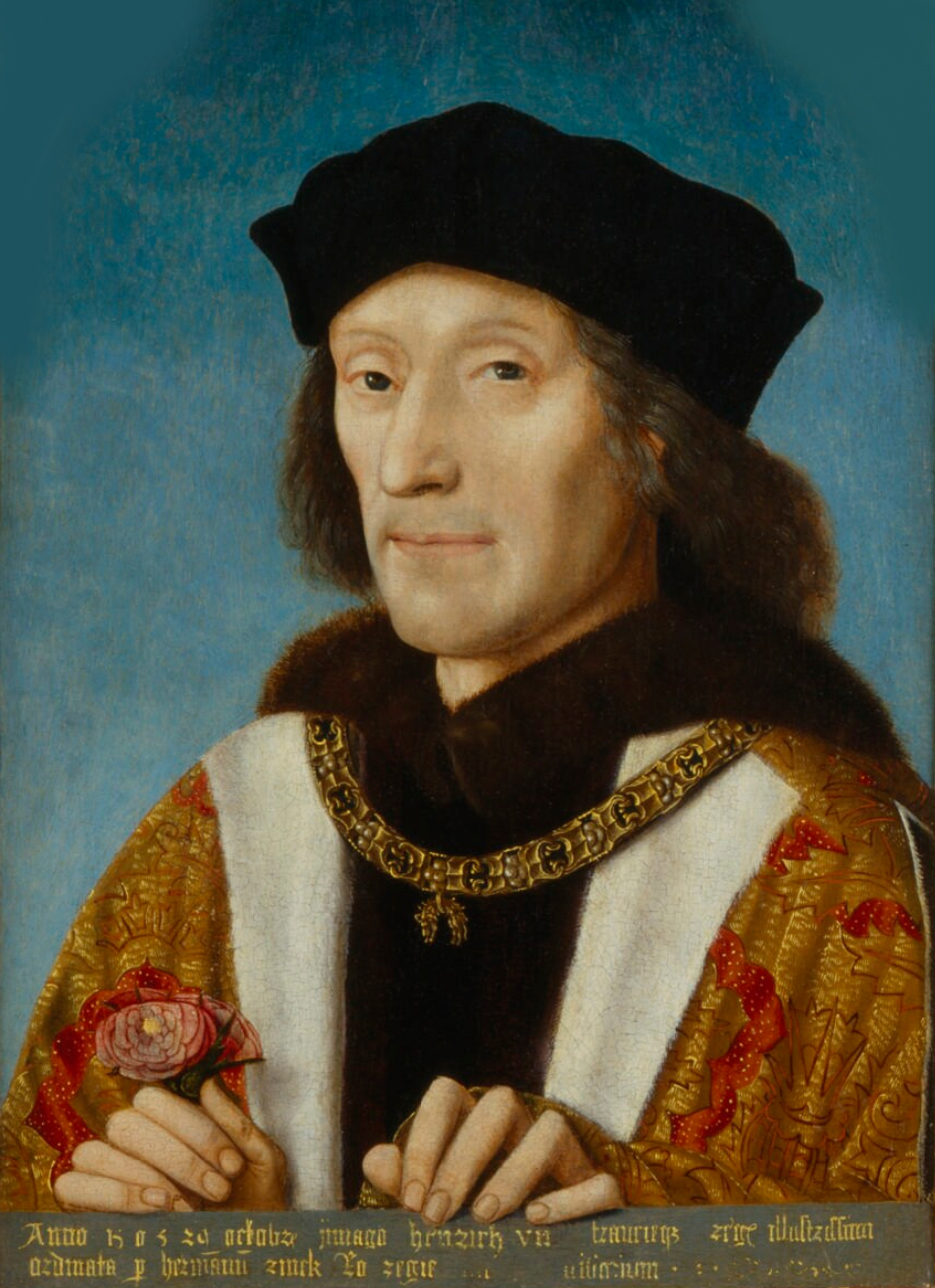
Henry VII (1505)

From mediaeval times, Rhys ap Gruffydd (c. 1132-1197), ruler of the kingdom of Deheubarth, was buried in the Monastery of Saint David, later the Cathedral, and Gerald of Wales was born c. 1146 at Manorbier Castle. Henry Tudor (later Henry VII) was born in 1457 at Pembroke Castle.

Robert Recorde, inventor of the equals sign (=) in mathematics was from Tenby.

The pirate Bartholomew Roberts was born in Casnewydd Bach, between Fishguard and Haverfordwest in 1682.

In later military history, Jemima Nicholas, heroine of the so-called "last invasion of Britain" in 1797, was from Fishguard, Lieutenant General Sir Thomas Picton GCB, born in Haverfordwest, was killed at the Battle of Waterloo in 1815 and Private Thomas Collins is believed to be the only Pembrokeshire man that fought in the Battle of Rorke's Drift in 1879.

In the arts, siblings Gwen and Augustus John were both born in Pembrokeshire, as was the novelist Sarah Waters; singer Connie Fisher grew up in Pembrokeshire. The actor Christian Bale was born in Haverfordwest.

Stephen Crabb, a former Secretary of State for Work and Pensions and Secretary of State for Wales, was brought up in Pembrokeshire and until 2024 was one of the county's two Members of Parliament, the other being Simon Hart, who served as Secretary of State for Wales from 2019 to 2022.

== Education and health ==
A comprehensive review of education in Pembrokeshire was carried out in 2014 with a number of options for discussion in 2015. In 2018 there were 58 primary schools, eight secondary schools (two for ages 3 to 16) and one special school, in all providing education for more than 18,300 pupils. These include 15 Welsh medium primary schools in the county, three dual stream schools and two transition schools; four primary schools are classified as English Welsh schools (English medium schools with significant use of Welsh). In 2017/18, 22 per cent of seven-year-old pupils were educated through the medium of Welsh. This figure was expected to rise to 25 per cent by 2019/20. In 2019, there were two fewer primary schools. The local authority's education budget for 2019/2020 was £88 million, equating to £4,856 per pupil. A February 2020 report by schools' inspection body Estyn, however, considered the local authority's performance in education provision "a significant concern".

Pembrokeshire has had a branch of the University of the Third Age (U3A) since 1991 and has a wide range of groups.

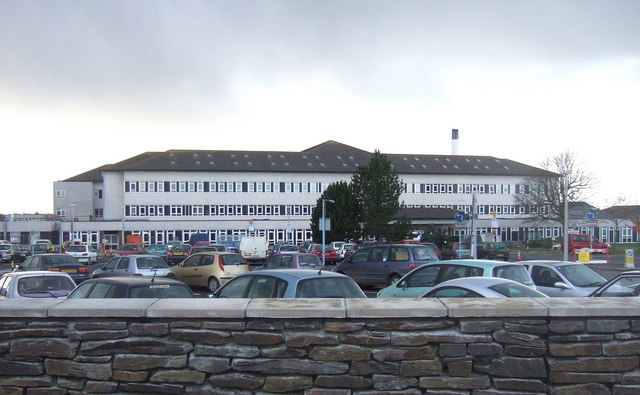
Withybush General Hospital, Haverfordwest

Health services in the county are provided by Hywel Dda University Health Board which also provides for Ceredigion and Carmarthenshire. The county's principal hospital is Withybush General Hospital in Haverfordwest, with local hospitals in Tenby and Pembroke Dock. In November 2018, the health board informed Pembrokeshire's Community Health Council that the county had 38 full-time and 34 part-time GPs.

== See also ==
- List of national parks of England and Wales
- List of castles in Pembrokeshire
- List of Scheduled prehistoric Monuments in north Pembrokeshire
- List of Scheduled prehistoric Monuments in south Pembrokeshire
- List of Scheduled Roman to modern Monuments in Pembrokeshire
- List of Lord Lieutenants of Pembrokeshire
- List of Custodes Rotulorum of Pembrokeshire
- List of High Sheriffs of Pembrokeshire
- List of MPs for the former county of Pembrokeshire
- Cuisine of Pembrokeshire
- Pembroke Welsh Corgi
