= History of Pembrokeshire =

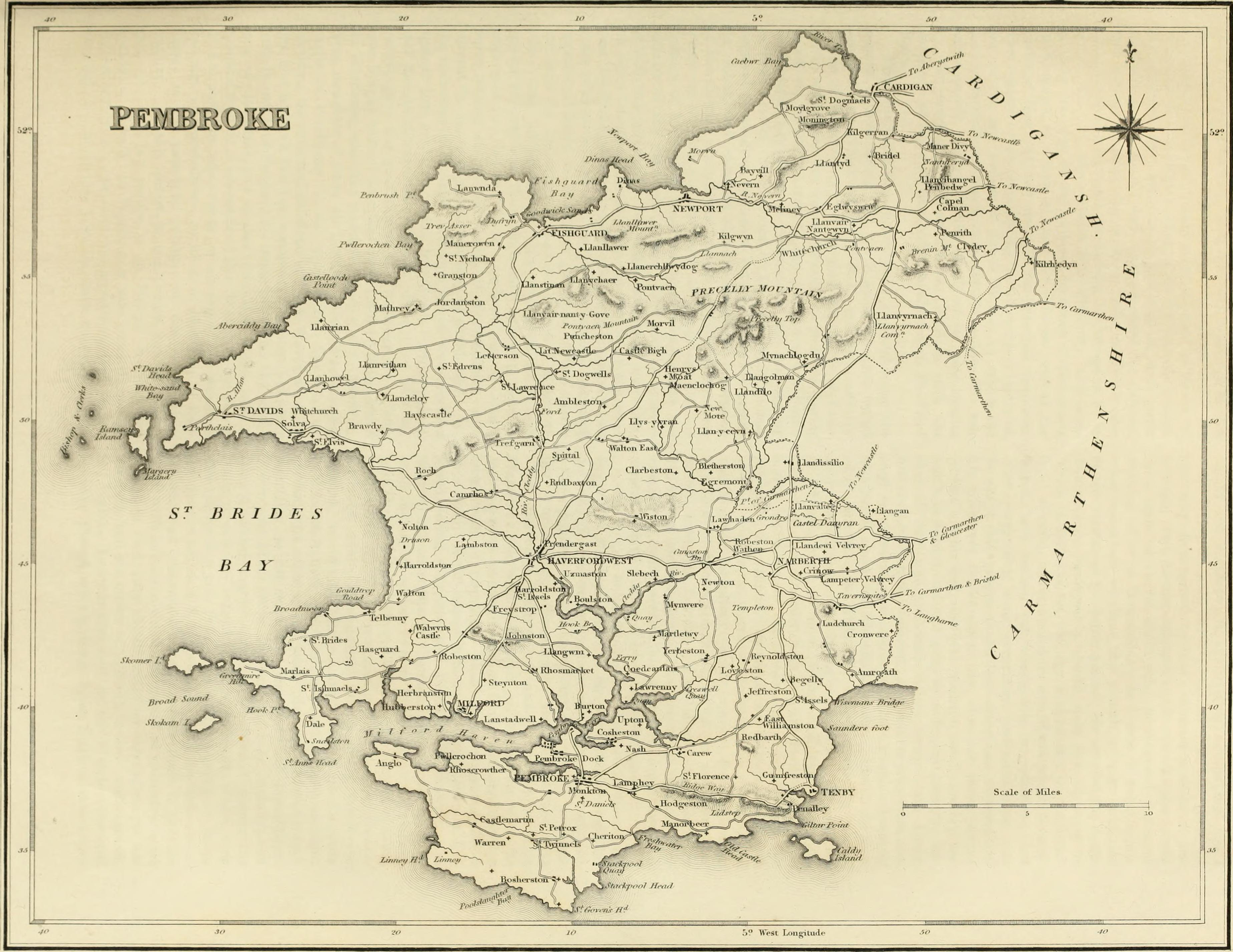
1834 map of Pembrokeshire

The history of Pembrokeshire in southwest Wales, starts in the Paleolithic era with archaeological evidence pointing to human presence in the county dating back at least 70,000 years, with notable prehistoric sites such as Pentre Ifan. Subsequent periods saw settlement by Celtic tribes, a relatively limited Roman presence, and an eventual emergence of a series of Welsh kingdoms. The region experienced Norman and Flemish colonisation during the Middle Ages, with the south later gaining the moniker Little England beyond Wales due to the comparative strength of English culture over Welsh culture, while under the marcher Lordship of the Earls of Pembroke.

Following the incorporation of Wales into the Kingdom of England by the Laws in Wales Acts, Pembrokeshire was reorganised administratively as an English shire with the Elizabethan era seeing growth in agriculture, fishing, and small-scale mining. The woollen industry, once dominant, declined significantly during this period. Unusually for Wales, the county aligned with the Roundheads during the English Civil Wars although Pembrokeshire was the site of a Royalist uprising in 1648, which culminated in the Siege of Pembroke and a decisive defeat by Oliver Cromwell, with Milford Haven serving as a key embarkation point for the Cromwellian conquest of Ireland. In the 18th and 19th centuries, Pembrokeshire remained largely rural. The Battle of Fishguard in 1797 marked the last attempted invasion of Britain, when French troops briefly landed near Goodwick before surrendering.

== Prehistory ==
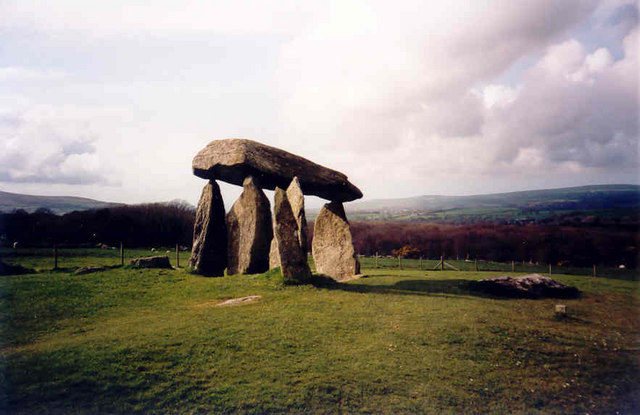
Pentre Ifan neolithic burial chamber

Human habitation of the region that is now Pembrokeshire extends back to between 125,000 and 70,000 years. There are numerous prehistoric sites such as Pentre Ifan, and remains of neolithic barrow graves have been found in the county. Neolithic graves were visible from the air during the 2018 heatwave. It is believed that many of the bluestones in Stonehenge came from the Preseli Mountains in Pembrokeshire. In 2018 a 1st-century Celtic chariot burial was discovered in Llanstadwell, the first such find in Wales. There may have been dairy farming in the Neolithic period.

== Roman period ==
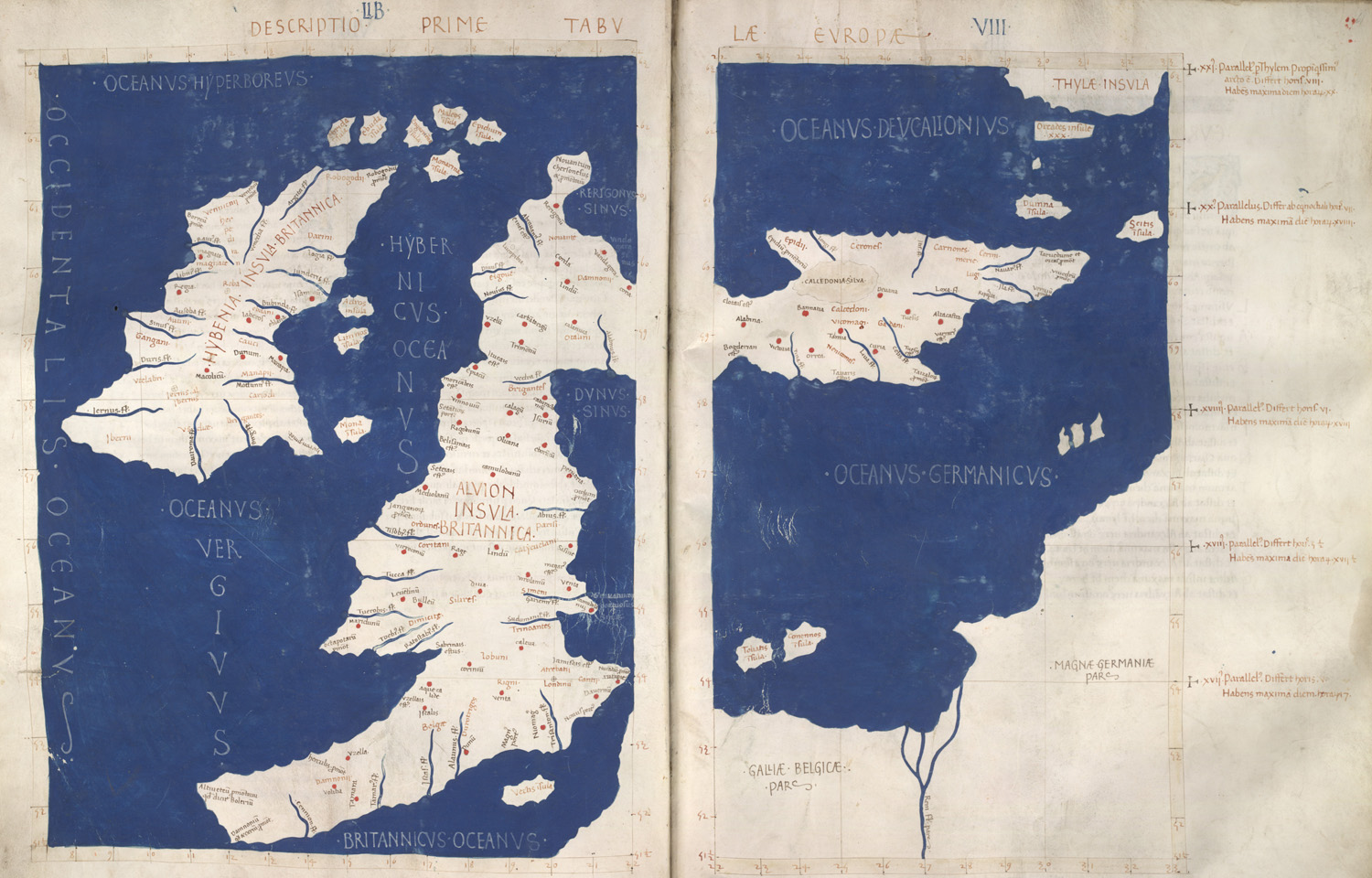
Map dated 1450-75 based on Ptolemy's "Geography" written c. 150

There is little evidence of Roman occupation in what is now Pembrokeshire. Ptolemy's Geography, written c. 150, mentioned some coastal places, two of which have been identified as the River Teifi and what is now St Davids Head; there may have been a Roman settlement near St Davids and a road from Bath, but this comes from a 14th-century writer. Any evidence for villas or Roman building materials reported by mediaeval or later writers has not been verified, though some remains near Dale were tentatively identified as Roman in character by topographer Richard Fenton in his Historical Tour of 1810. Fenton stated that he had "...reason to be of opinion that they had not colonized Pembrokeshire till near the decline of their empire in Britain".

Part of a possible Roman road is noted by CADW near Llanddewi Velfrey, and another near Wiston. Wiston is also the location of the first Roman fort discovered in Pembrokeshire, investigated in 2013. A find in north Pembrokeshire in 2024 of the likely remains of a Roman fort adds to the extent of Roman military presence in the area.

Some artefacts, including coins and weapons, have been found, but it is not clear whether these belonged to Romans or to a Romanised population. Welsh tradition has it that Magnus Maximus founded Haverfordwest, and took a large force of local men on campaign in Gaul in 383 which, together with the reduction of Roman forces in south Wales, left a defensive vacuum which was filled by incomers from Ireland.

== Sub-Roman period ==
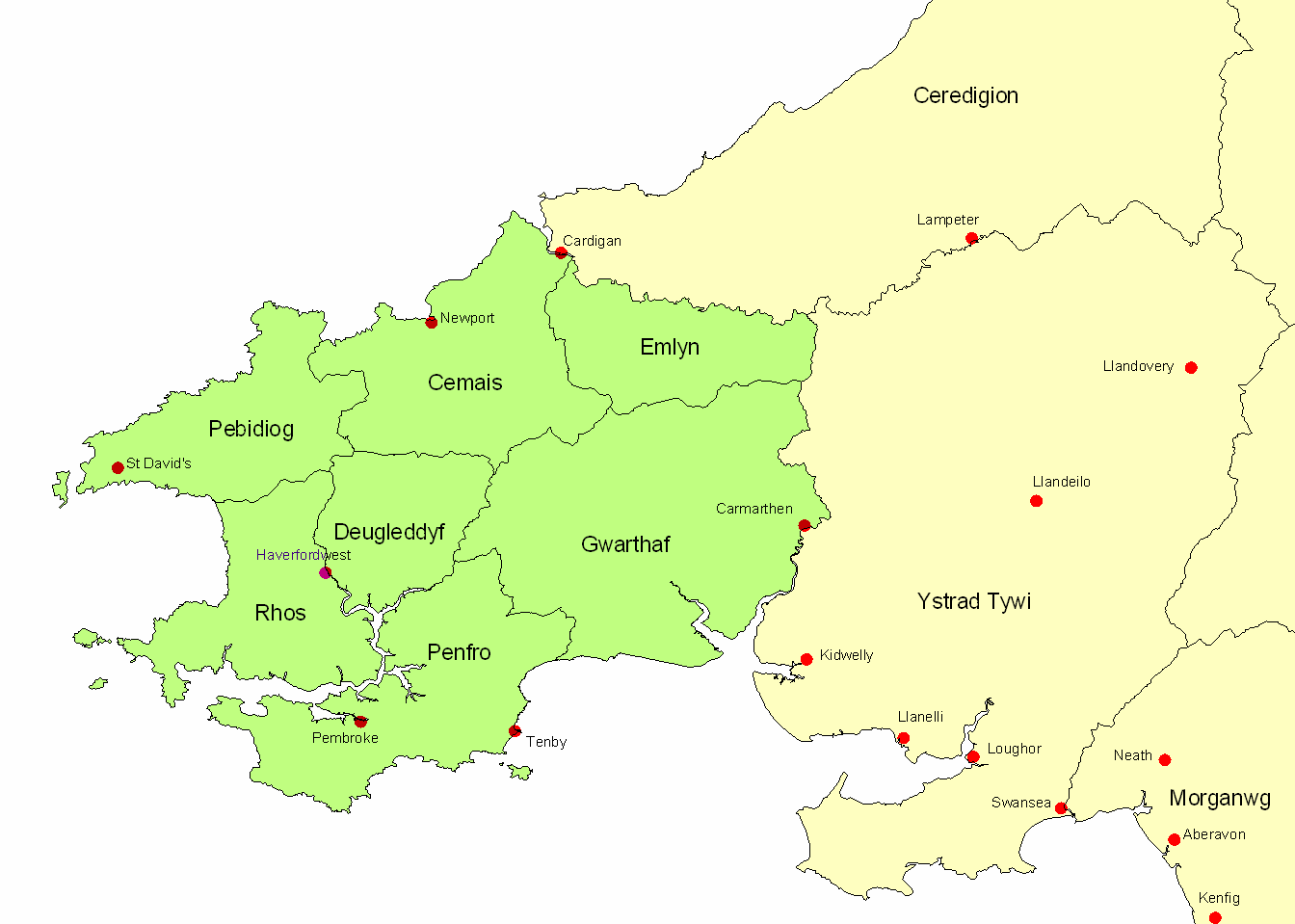
Dyfed, after the late 7th century, showing its seven cantrefi

Between 350 and 400, an Irish tribe known as the Déisi settled in the region known to the Romans as Demetae. The Déisi merged with the local Welsh, with the regional name underlying Demetae evolving into Dyfed, which existed as an independent petty kingdom from the 5th century.

Saint David founded an important monastery in the sixth century. Despite frequent Viking raids it had such a good religious and intellectual reputation that King Alfred requested monks from there to rebuild the Kingdom of Wessex's intellectual life including Asser, the author of the Life of King Alfred.

In 904, Hywel Dda married Elen (died 943), daughter of the king of Dyfed Llywarch ap Hyfaidd, and merged Dyfed with his own maternal inheritance of Seisyllwg, forming the new realm of Deheubarth ("southern district"). Between the Roman and Norman periods, the region was subjected to raids from Vikings, who established settlements and trading posts at Haverfordwest, Fishguard, Caldey Island and elsewhere.

== Norman period and Middle Ages ==
During the early Middle Ages Pembrokeshire was disputed between the Welsh Prince of Deheubarth and the Norman and Angevin Kings of England and their Marcher Lords the Earls of Pembroke. For most of this period both sides controlled some of the present day County, with Pembroke Castle always remaining under English Control even when Deheubarth controlled almost all of the rest of the area.

Dyfed remained an integral province of Deheubarth, but this was contested by invading Normans and Flemings who arrived between 1067 and 1111. The region became known as Pembroke (sometimes archaic "Penbroke"), after the Norman castle built in the cantref of Penfro. As part of this invasion, in 1081 William the Conqueror went on an armed pilgrimage to St Davids on the west coast in 1081 to St Davids in honour of Saint David, although by the end of 1081, William was back on the continent. In 1123, Pope Calixtus II made St Davids a centre of pilgrimage within Western Europe when he decreed that "Two pilgrimages to St Davids is equal to one to Rome, and three pilgrimages to one to Jerusalem".

In 1136, Prince Owain Gwynedd at Crug Mawr near Cardigan met and destroyed a 3,000-strong Norman/Flemish army and incorporated Deheubarth into Gwynedd. Norman/Flemish influence never fully recovered in West Wales, although culturally the relative strength of the English language, culture and loyalties in the south of the County would give it the name Little England beyond Wales. In 1138, the county of Pembrokeshire was named as a county palatine. The Norman invasion of Ireland starting in 1169 involved the locally influential Richard Strongbow who had previously been the second Earl of Pembroke, and Henry II used Pembroke Castle as a base to negotiate with Strongbow and to himself embark for Ireland.

Rhys ap Gruffydd, the son of Owain Gwynedd's daughter Gwenllian, re-established Welsh control over much of the region and threatened to retake all of Pembrokeshire, but died in 1197. After Deheubarth was split by a dynastic feud, Llywelyn the Great almost succeeded in retaking the region of Pembroke between 1216 and his death in 1240. Following the Conquest of Wales by Edward I, in 1284 the Statute of Rhuddlan was enacted to introduce the English common law system to Wales, heralding 100 years of peace, but had little effect on those areas already established under the Marcher Lords, such as Cemais in the north of the county.

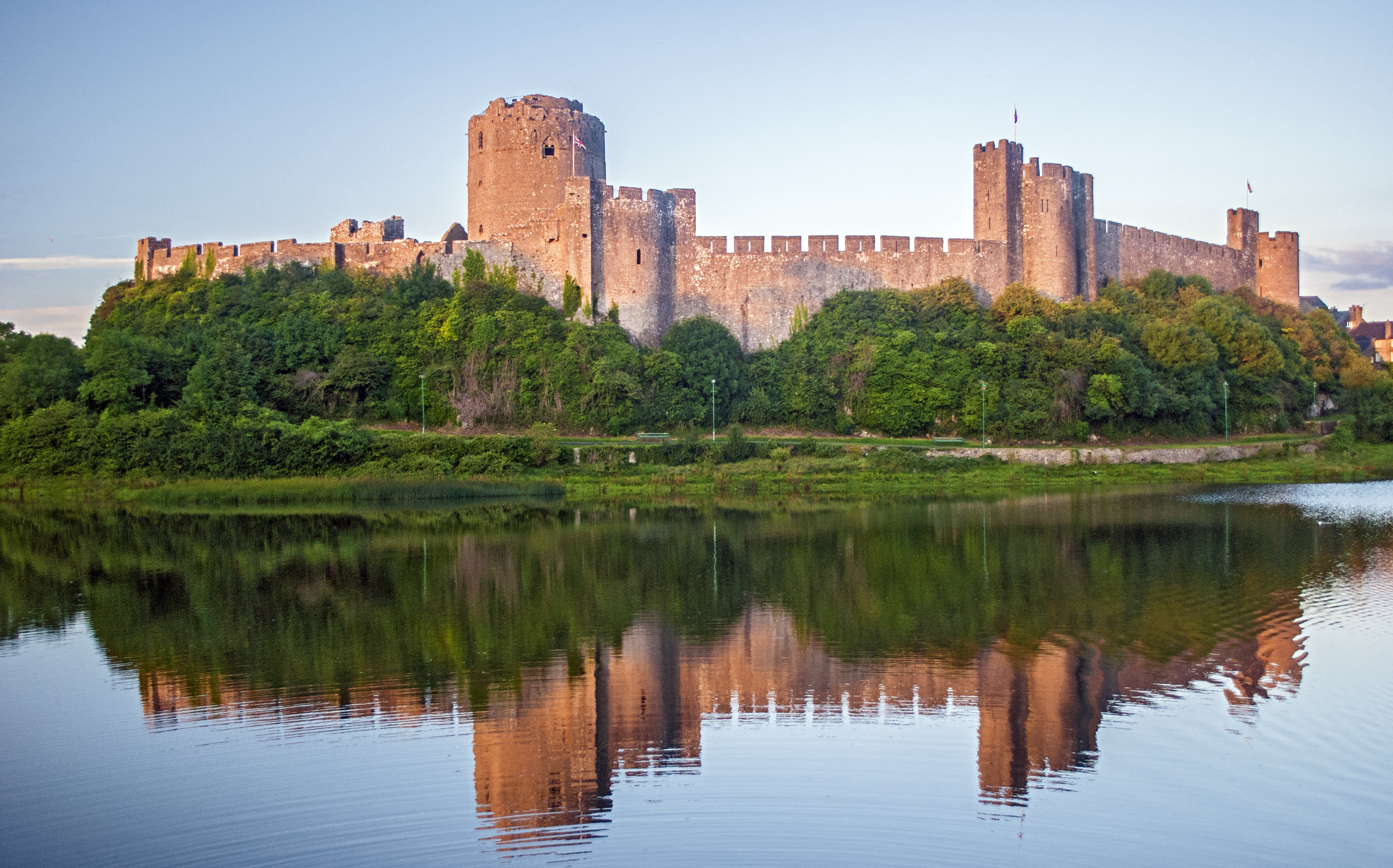
Pembroke Castle, birthplace of Henry VII

Henry Tudor, born at Pembroke Castle in 1457, landed an army in Pembrokeshire in 1485 and marched to Cardigan. Rallying support, he continued to Leicestershire and defeated the larger army of Richard III at the Battle of Bosworth Field. As Henry VII, he became the first monarch of the House of Tudor, which ruled England until 1603.

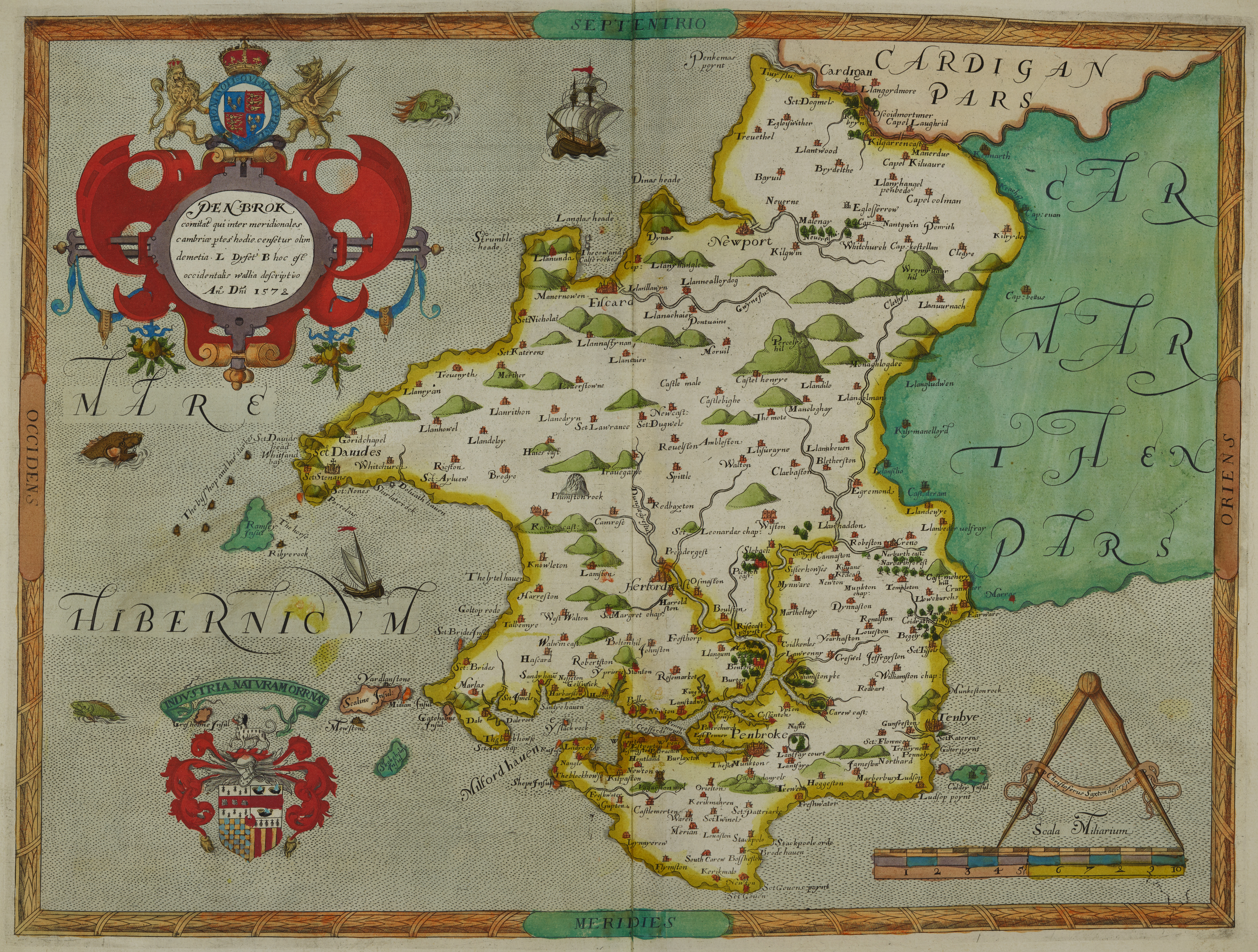
Hand-drawn map of Pembrokeshire by Christopher Saxton from 1577

== Tudor and Stuart periods ==
The Laws in Wales Act 1535 effectively abolished the powers of the Marcher Lords and divided the county into seven hundreds, roughly corresponding to the seven pre-Norman cantrefi of Dyfed. The hundreds were (clockwise from the northeast): Cilgerran, Cemais, Dewisland, Roose, Castlemartin, Narberth and Dungleddy and each was divided into civil parishes; a 1578 map by Christopher Saxton is the earliest known to show parishes and chapelries in Pembrokeshire. (See List of hundreds in Wales#Pembrokeshire for a list of parishes in medieval Pembrokeshire.) The Elizabethan era brought renewed prosperity to the county through an opening up of rural industries, including agriculture, mining and fishing, with exports to England and Ireland, though the formerly staple woollen industry had all but disappeared.

During the First English Civil War (1642–1646) Pembroke and its castle declared for Parliament although the rest of Wales including other parts of Pembrokeshire strongly sided with the King. It was besieged by Royalist troops but was saved after Parliamentary reinforcements arrived by sea from nearby Milford Haven. Parliamentary forces then went on to capture the Royalist castles of Tenby, Haverfordwest and Carew.

In 1648, at the beginning of the Second Civil War, local units of the New Model Army mutinied over pay and then contacted Charles I. Pembroke's commander Colonel John Poyer led a Royalist uprising alongside Colonel Powell, Tenby Castle, and Sir Nicholas Kemoys, Chepstow Castle. Oliver Cromwell came to Pembroke on 24 May 1648 and took the castle after a seven-week siege. Its three leaders were found guilty of treason and Cromwell ordered the castle to be destroyed. Townspeople were even encouraged to disassemble the fortress and re-use its stone for their purposes.

On 13 August 1649, the Cromwellian conquest of Ireland began when New Model Army forces sailed from Milford Haven.

== 18th and 19th centuries ==
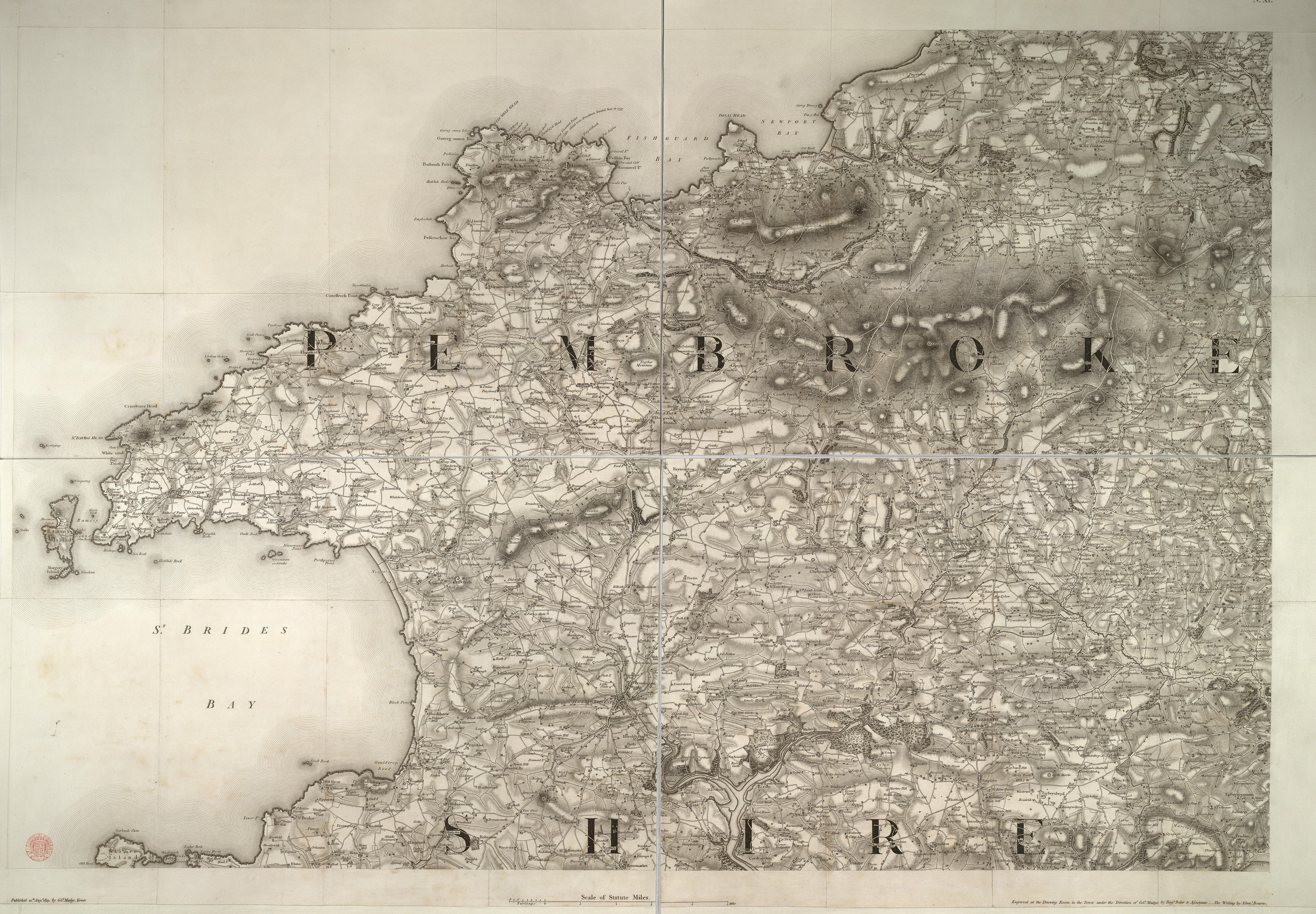
1819 Ordnance Survey map of north and west Pembrokeshire

In 1720, Emmanuel Bowen described Pembrokeshire as having five market towns, 45 parishes and about 4,329 houses, with an area of 420,000 acres (1,700 km^{2}). In 1791 a petition was presented to the House of Commons concerning the poor state of many of the county's roads, pointing out that repairs could not be made compulsory by the law as it stood. The petition was referred to committee. People applying for poor relief were often put to work mending roads. Workhouses were poorly documented. Under the Poor Laws, costs and provisions were kept to a minimum, but the emphasis was often on helping people to be self-employed. While the Poor Laws provided a significant means of support, there were many charitable and benefit societies.

After the Battle of Fishguard, the failed French invasion of 1797, 500 French prisoners were held at Golden Hill Farm, Pembroke. From 1820 to 1878 one of the county's prisons, with a capacity of 86, was in the grounds of Haverfordwest Castle. In 1831, the area of the county was calculated to be 345,600 acres (1,399 km^{2}) with a population of 81,424.

It was not until nearly the end of the 19th century that mains water was provided to rural south Pembrokeshire by means of a reservoir at Rosebush and cast iron water pipes throughout the district.

== 20th century ==
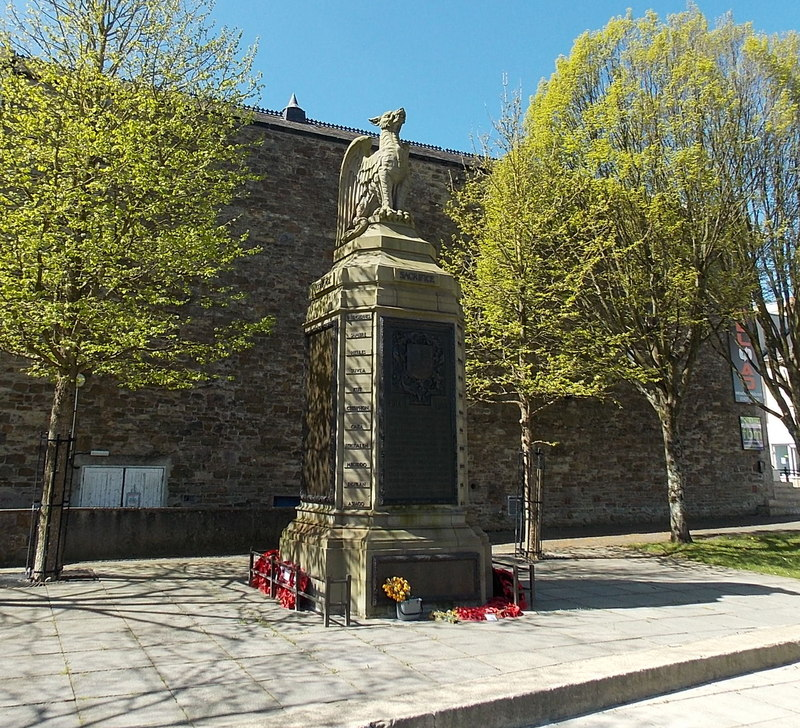
Pembrokeshire County War Memorial, near County Hall, Haverfordwest

Throughout much of the 20th century (1911 to 1961) the population density in the county remained stable while it rose in England and Wales as a whole. There was considerable military activity in Pembrokeshire and offshore in the 20th century: a naval base at Milford Haven because German U-boats were active off the coast in World War I. The County of Pembroke War Memorial in Haverfordwest carries the names of 1,200 of those that perished in World War I. Pembrokeshire saw no direct attack during World War I, yet widespread rumours of German spies, coastal raids and aerial bombardment created what one historian calls an “imagined war.” Local newspapers, drawing on invasion‑story fiction, printed unverified claims of enemy agents, poisoned local water supplies and imminent Zeppelin strikes. The Pembrokeshire War Savings Movement was a local initiative during World War I to encourage county residents to invest in the war effort through the purchase of war bonds and savings certificates. Linking savings with schools was key; schools were the backbone of the 138 war savings associations which were operational in Pembrokeshire in the summer of 1918. The movement continued beyond the end of the war; for the week ending 1 February 1919, some 2,308,810 certificates were sold.

In World War II, there were military exercises in the Preseli Mountains and a number of military airfields established. The wartime increase in air activity saw a number of aircraft accidents and fatalities, often due to unfamiliarity with the terrain. From 1943 to 1944, 5,000 soldiers from the United States Army's 110th Infantry Regiment were based in the county, preparing for D-Day. Military and industrial targets in the county were subjected to bombing during World War II. After the end of the war, German prisoners of war were accommodated in Pembrokeshire, the largest prison being at Haverfordwest, housing 600.

In 1972, a second reservoir for south Pembrokeshire, at Llys y Fran, was completed. In February 1996, the Pembrokeshire coast suffered the UK's (then) third worst oil spill when the Sea Empress ran aground at the entrance to Milford Haven.
