= Castlemartin =

Castlemartin may refer to:

- Castlemartin, Pembrokeshire, a village in Wales
  - Castlemartin (hundred), a former administrative unit in Wales named after the village
  - Castlemartin Training Area, British Army training area
- Castlemartin House and Estate, County Kildare, Ireland
