= Penfro (disambiguation) =

Penfro may refer to:

- the Welsh name of Pembroke, a town and community in Wales
- the cantref of Penfro, one of the seven cantrefi of the Kingdom of Dyfed
- William "Penfro" Rowlands (1860-1937), a Welsh schoolteacher and composer
