= Warren, Pembrokeshire =

Parish in Pembrokeshire, Wales

Coordinates: 51.64°N 04.99°W

Warren
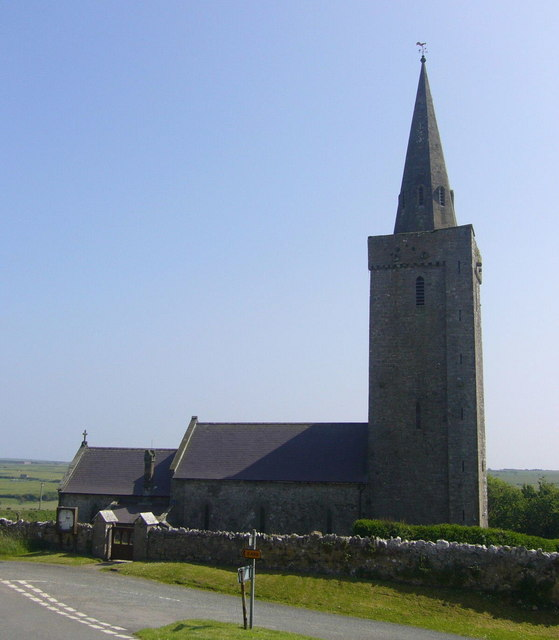
- St Mary's Church

- Location within Pembrokeshire
- Community: Stackpole and Castlemartin
- Principal area: Pembrokeshire
- Country: Wales
- Sovereign state: United Kingdom
- Post town: PEMBROKE
- Postcode district: SA71
- Dialling code: 01646
- Police: Dyfed-Powys
- Fire: Mid and West Wales
- Ambulance: Welsh
- UK Parliament: Preseli Pembrokeshire
- Senedd Cymru – Welsh Parliament: Preseli Pembrokeshire

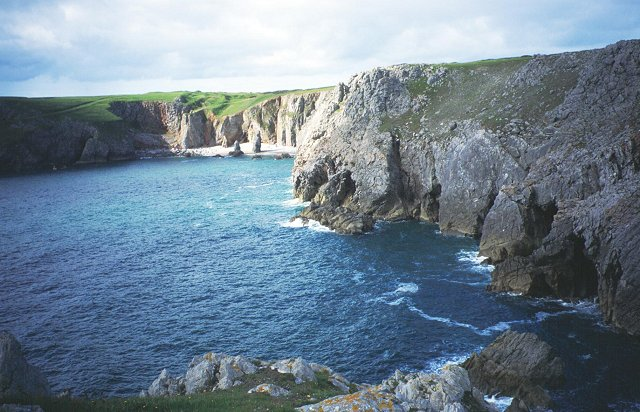
Flimston Bay

Warren is an ancient parish in the community of Stackpole and Castlemartin, in the most southerly part of Pembrokeshire, Wales. Its northern edge is 5 miles (8 km) south of Pembroke and its southern edge reaches the sea at Flimston Bay. It is bordered by Castlemartin to the west, St Twynnells to the east and Monkton to the north.

== History ==
Warren was a parish in the hundred of Castlemartin, which in pre-Norman times was part of the Cantref of Penfro in the Kingdom of Dyfed.

A prominent ridge in the northern part of the parish is crossed by a ridgeway that may be of prehistoric origin.

The origin of the name is obscure, but there is a Warren Farm (a listed building) and an ancient fortification (a scheduled monument) close by. A 1578 map in the British Library shows the parish as Waren.

Merrion Court is a Grade II listed building in the east of the parish, a 19th-century structure built on 18th century ruins. Richard Fenton, in 1811, described the house as a ruin, previously a manor belonging to Lord Cawdor. Merrion Court's Granary Range and Mill are also Grade II listed. Another listed building in the parish is an 18th or early 19th cottage (originally two or three) called Cold Comfort.

Since 1801, the population (then 160) has been sparse and scattered in this agricultural landscape, and fell in most subsequent decades, to a low of 86 in 1961. The number of houses in the parish halved between 1831 and 1961. The religious census of 1851 described the parish as "...a small Parish consisting of Three Farms only with a few cottages tenanted by poor Labourers and families who are mostly Dissenters or Independents whose place of Worship is situated in a Neighbouring Parish although they occasionally attend the Church". The 1872 Imperial Gazetteer gives the parish area as 1,169 acres (473 ha) and a population of 121 in 18 houses, all in one estate.

From 1939 to 1948, the Castlemartin Training Area was established—its main base is at Merrion—absorbing most of Warren parish.

== St Mary's Church ==
The former parish church of St Mary is located in a prominent position on a ridge and is thought to date from the 13th century. It consists of a nave a with a south transept, and a tower topped by a stone spire. The north aisle was removed in 1770. The church was restored in 1855 to designs by Abraham Leach, when a new chancel, chancel arch and south transept arch were added, and the windows were replaced. The church is a Grade II* listed building.

The original wooden spire was replaced with a stone spire in about 1870 with help from the Admiralty. War with France was anticipated, and the Admiralty wanted the church tower to serve as a landmark for shipping.

The churchyard cross was installed in 1925 on a much older three-stepped stone base, which may be medieval.

In a poor state of repair, the church was closed by the Diocese of St Davids in 1970. In 1986 it was decided to use the church as an interdenominational place of worship for British and German troops at the Castlemartin Training Area, and the church was restored. It was reopened by the Archbishop of Wales in 1988, in the presence of Anglican, Roman Catholic and German Lutheran clergy.
