= Freshwater West =

Beach near Castlemartin, Pembrokeshire in West Wales

Coordinates: 51.66°N 5.06°W

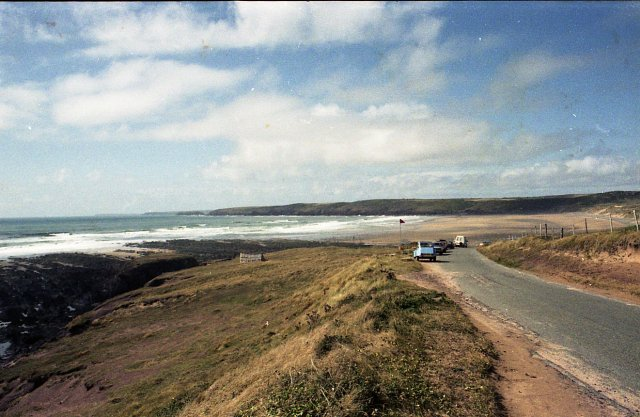
- Freshwater West Beach

- Location within Pembrokeshire
- OS grid reference: SR884997
- Principal area: Pembrokeshire
- Preserved county: Dyfed
- Country: Wales
- Sovereign state: United Kingdom
- Postcode district: SA71
- Police: Dyfed-Powys
- Fire: Mid and West Wales
- Ambulance: Welsh

Freshwater West (also known as Fresh West) is a beach near Castlemartin, Pembrokeshire in West Wales. It lies along the B4319 road and is part of the Pembrokeshire Coast National Park. Freshwater West, noted for its strong waves and currents, is one of Wales' top surfing locations. The Castlemartin MOD firing range is located nearby.

== Geography ==
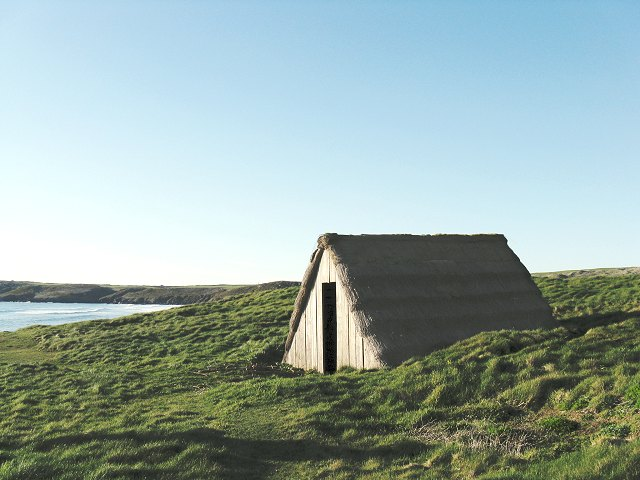
Seaweed-drying hut on Little Furznip

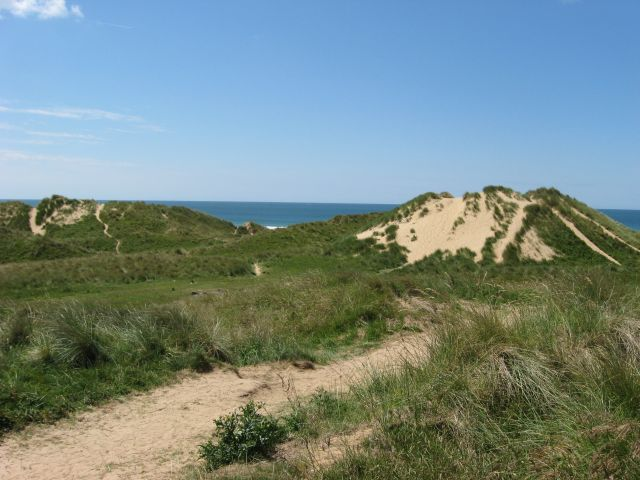
Back of the dunes at Freshwater West

The rocky outcrop at the southern part of the bay near the car park is known as Little Furznip, and has a seaweed-drying hut on the clifftop. Little Furznip divides Freshwater from Frainslake Bay to the south, and beyond that, Linney Head. During historical times the beach was used by smugglers. To the northwest along the coast are Gravel Bay, Black Cave, East Pickard Bay, West Pickard Bay, Guttle Hole, Parsonsquarry Bay and Sheep Island. The headland between Sheep Island in the northwest and Linney Head in the southeast consists primarily of red sandstone, which "form[s] irregular, steep cliffs with fallen rocks at the back of beaches". Towards the centre are older Lower Palaeozoic mudstone and siltstone, and to both the north and the south is Old Red Sandstone. Behind the bays are extensive dune fields such as Broomhill Burrows and Gupton Burrows and a river valley. The low cliffs on the south facing coast reach an elevation of 55 metres (180 ft), rising gently behind to 63 metres (207 ft).

The water at Freshwater West is part of the Pembrokeshire Marine SAC, and it also forms part of the Angle Peninsula Coast SSSI. It is situated within Pembrokeshire Coast National Park. There are strong currents from the northwest and southeast, while the beach has a tidal range of 6.5 metres (21 ft). At almost a mile long, Freshwater West is flanked by extensive sand dunes and rock pools. The land in the area consists of dunes with fens, grassland, reedbeds, purple moor grass, rush pastures, and maritime cliffs, and is inhabited by wildlife such as waders, chough, overwintering northern lapwing, and grey seal. Despite its natural beauty, Freshwater West is unsuitable for bathing due to strong offshore swells and strong currents. There is an abundance of fossils in the area, and in 1921 some 50 were reported to have been discovered here.

== Landmarks and surfing ==
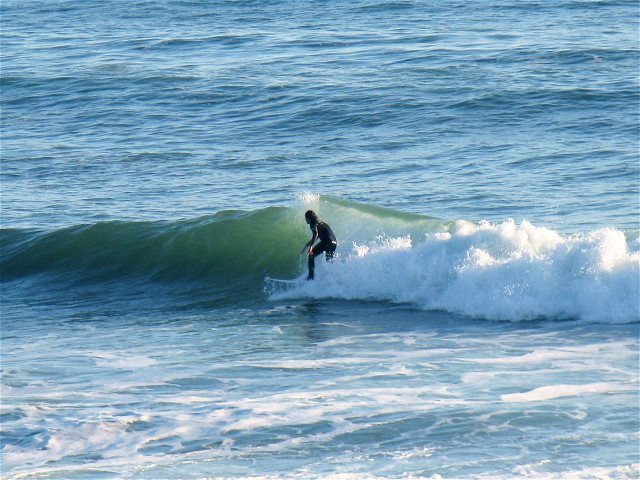
Surfing at Freshwater West

The beach is popular with tourists and locals throughout the year, especially between March and October. Facilities at the beach include toilets, emergency telephone and car parking. From Easter onwards, an ice-cream or hot-dog van is usually in the main car park. There is the Castlemartin MOD firing range in the area which can be alarming and pose a hazard within a 12 miles (19 km) radius during peak firing. Freshwater has a thatched seaweed-drying hut, and there is an Iron Age burial chamber immediately to the north known as the "Devil's Quoit" which is situated in the field left of the main road out of Freshwater.

Freshwater West is one of the top surfing locations in Wales due to its consistent swell and strong waves. The beach regularly hosts surfing tournaments such as the Welsh National Surfing Championships with participants arriving from all over the world. Since 2010 it has had a lifeguard station which is active during the summer months.

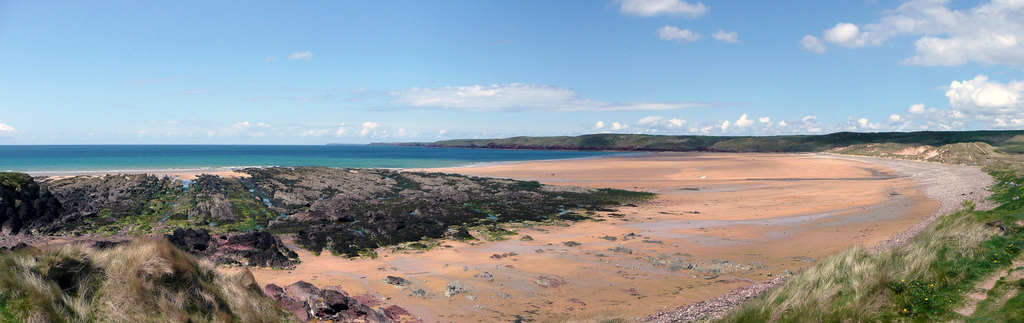
Freshwater West

== Filming location ==
As a filming location, Freshwater West featured extensively in the 2010 film Robin Hood starring Russell Crowe, which depicted the French invasion of southern England. Over 600 extras and 150 horses were used during the filming on the beach. It was also a filming location for the final two Harry Potter films; Harry Potter and the Deathly Hallows – Part 1 and Part 2. The beach scenes with Dobby the elf were filmed on the beach, where he would be eventually buried, and "Shell Cottage" was constructed at the foot of the sand dunes. The cottage was removed after filming. Dobby's "grave" was allowed to be retained by the National Trust for Wales but they asked visitors not to leave painted pebbles or socks as tributes. During its design phase, the Greenlink submarine cable was reportedly rerouted due to concerns from Harry Potter fans that it would disturb Dobby's "grave".

Freshwater West was also used as a filming location in series four of BBC production The Sarah Jane Adventures and the film The Thief of Bagdad.

Freshwater West, Pembrokeshire
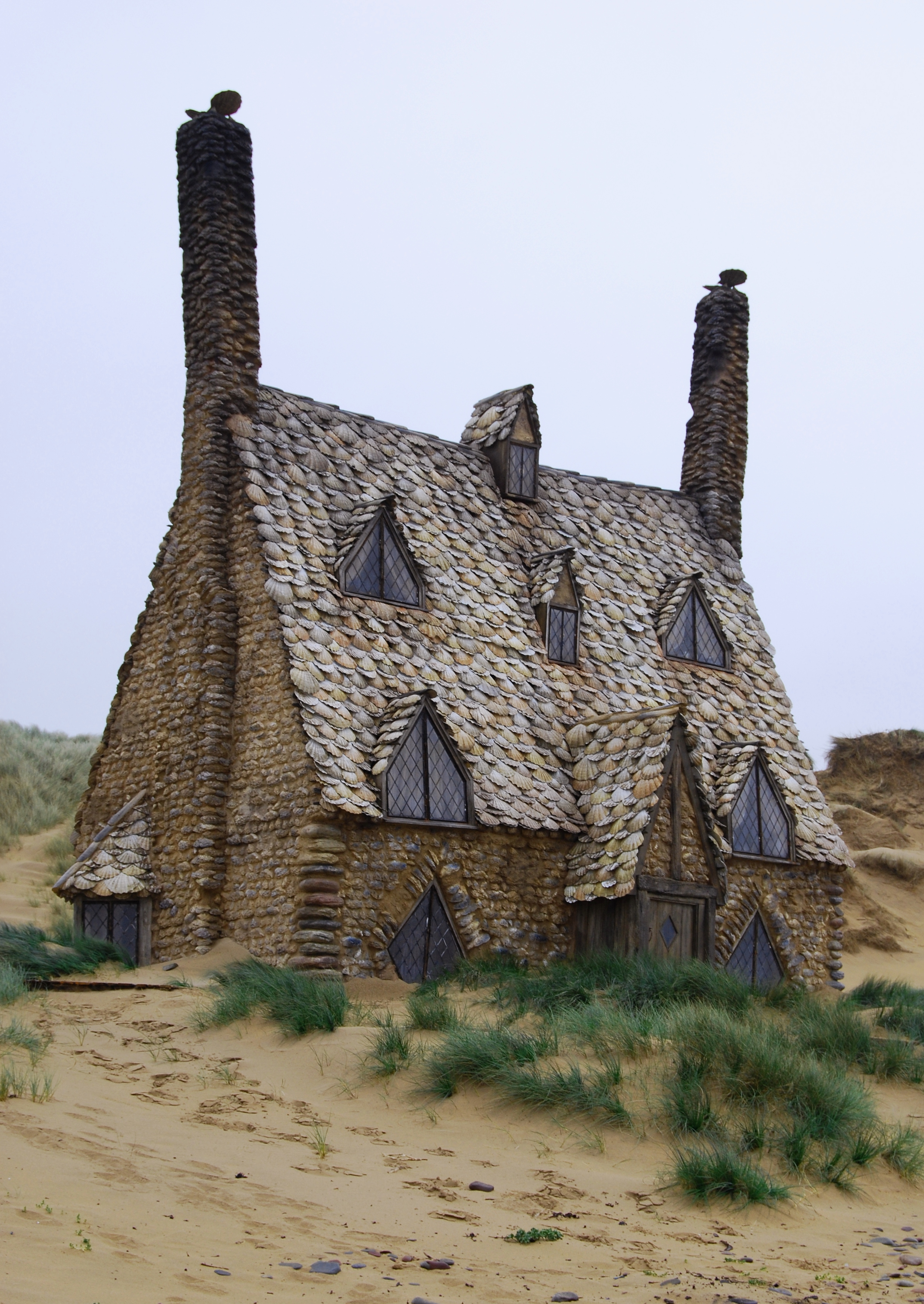
Shell Cottage - while filming Harry Potter

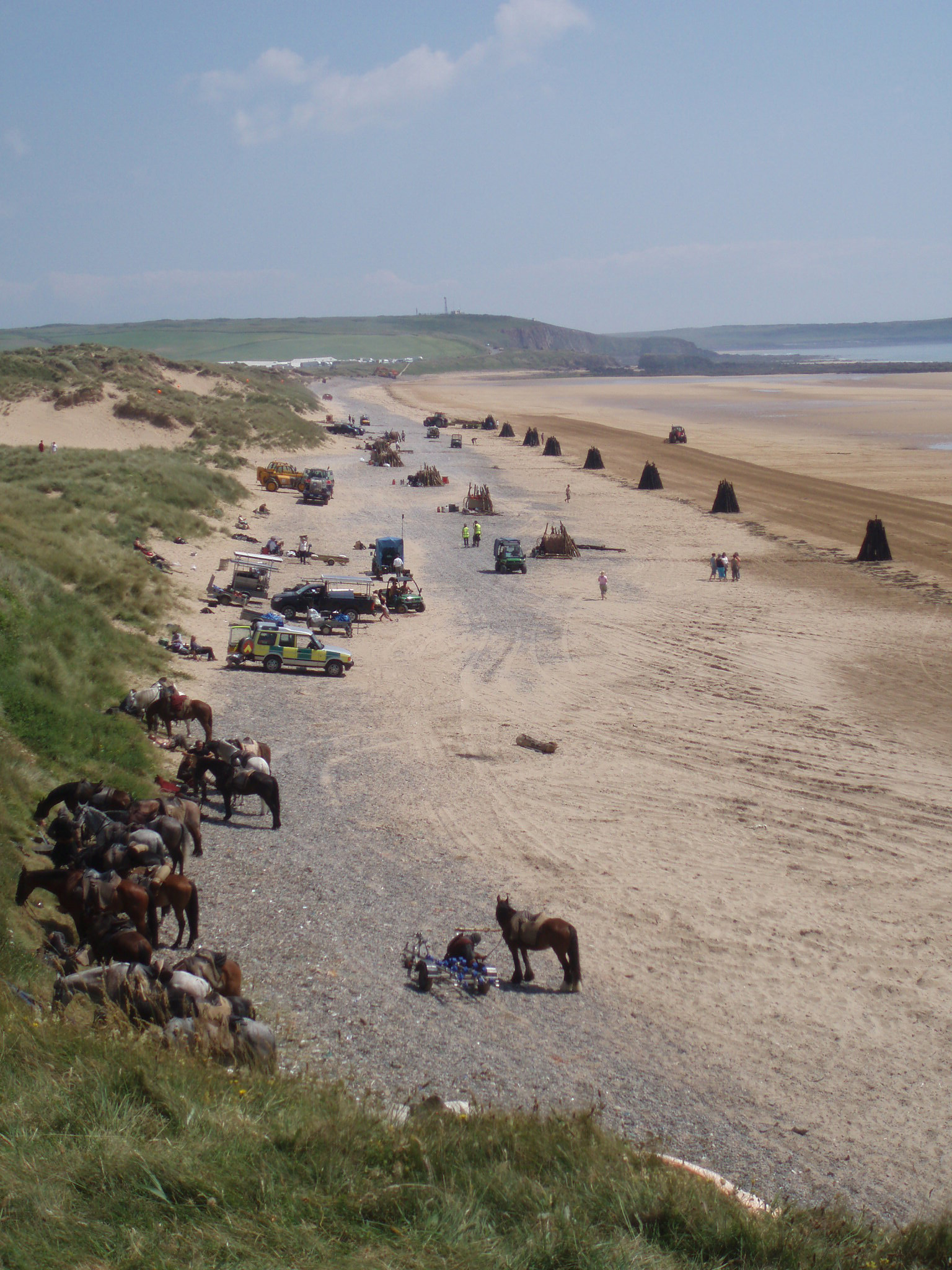
Filming Robin Hood

== See also ==
- Freshwater East
- List of beaches in the United Kingdom
