= B4319 road =

Road in Pembrokeshire, Wales

B4319
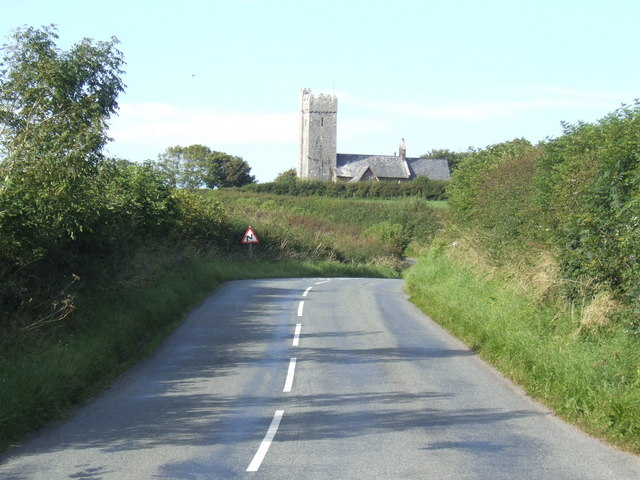

Major junctions
- East end: A4139 road Pembroke
- West end: B4320 road Freshwater West

Location
- Country: United Kingdom

Road network
- Roads in the United Kingdom; Motorways; A and B road zones

h The B4319 is a road in Pembrokeshire in Wales. It starts from the A4139 at 51°40′23″N 4°54′43″W in Pembroke, to continue towards the Stackpole Estate. It heads for Castlemartin, passes Freshwater West and terminates at its junction with the B4320 at 51°40′4″N 5°3′41″W near Angle.

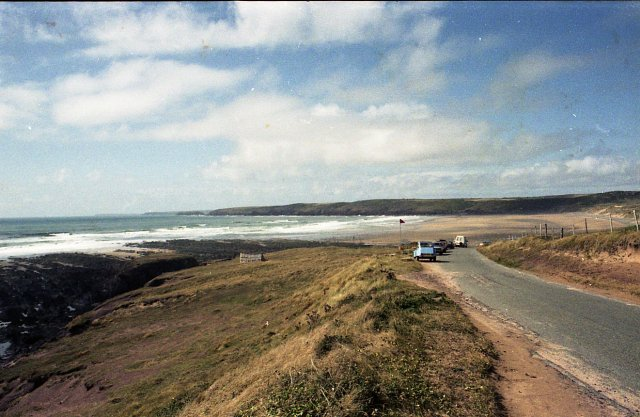
Freshwater West(1984)
