= Church of St Michael and All Angels, Castlemartin, Pembrokeshire =

St Michael's Church, Castlemartin
- Church of St Michael and All Angels, Castlemartin
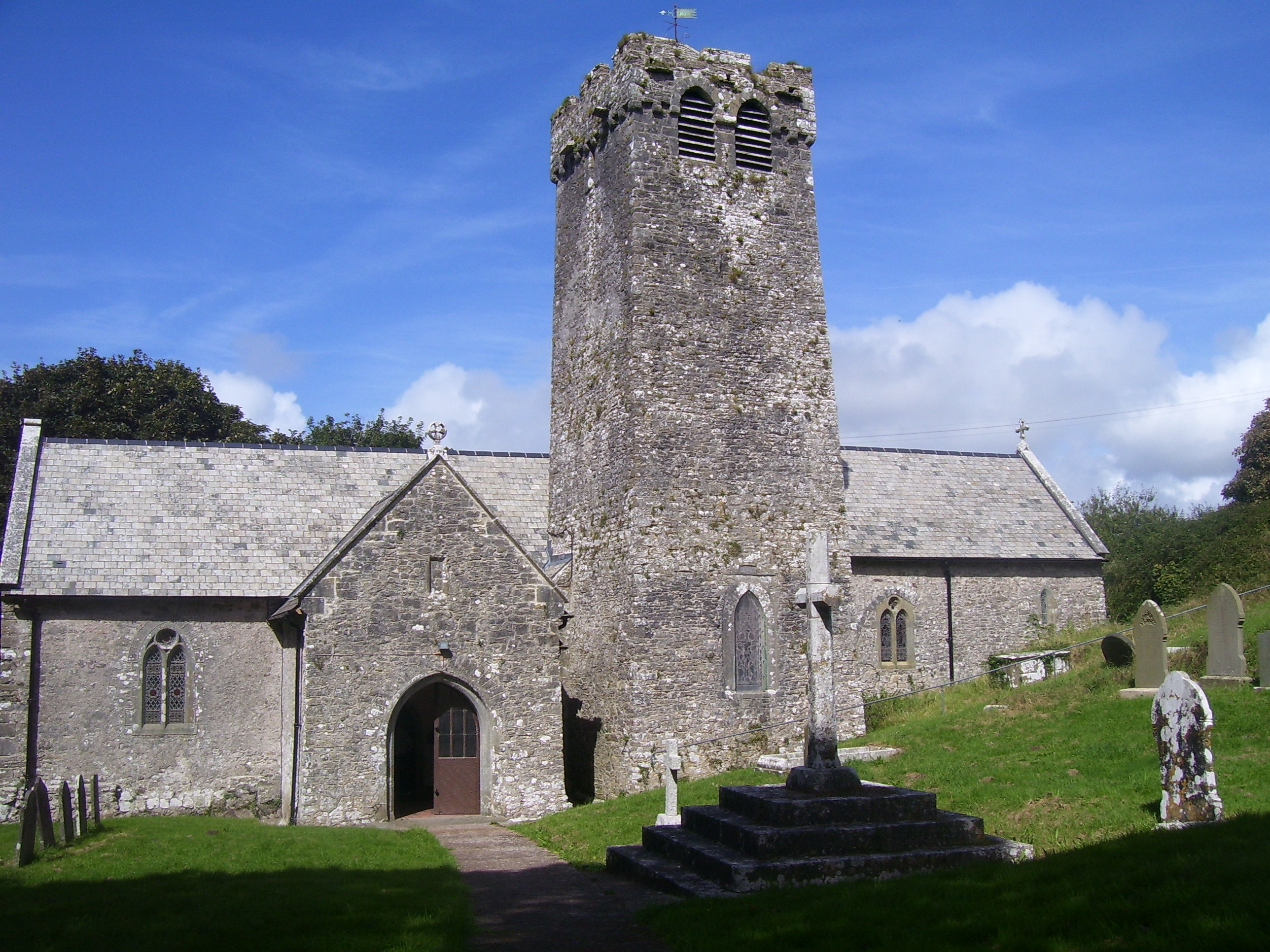

- Location in Pembrokeshire
- 51.6498°N 5.0216°W
- Location: Castlemartin, Pembrokeshire
- Country: Wales
- Denomination: Church in Wales

History
- Status: Redundant
- Founded: 13th century
- Dedication: Saint Michael and All Angels

Architecture
- Heritage designation: Grade I
- Designated: 14 May 1970
- Architectural type: Church

Specifications
- Materials: Stone, slate roof

The Church of St Michael and All Angels, Castlemartin, Pembrokeshire, Wales is a redundant church dating from the 13th century. A Grade I listed building, the church is now in the care of the Friends of Friendless Churches.

== History and description ==
St Michael and All Angels stands outside the village of Castlemartin, adjacent to two holy wells which may indicate the site held religious significance in pre-historic times. A cross, dating from the 7th–9th centuries, was discovered embedded in the church wall in 1922, but has subsequently been lost. The main body of the current building dates from the 13th century, although the centrally-placed tower is later, of the 14th or 15th centuries. The church was restored, firstly in the early 19th century, and again in 1858. The architect of the latter restoration was David Brandon, and the patron the 2nd Earl Cawdor. The church has some notable Victorian stained glass from the studios of Hardman & Co. and Heaton, Butler and Bayne. A Hardman window of the Crucifixion, to a design by Augustus Pugin, has been described as the best example of Pugin's work of any church in Wales. The church contains a First World War memorial commemorating three men from Castlemartin who were killed in the conflict. The church was declared redundant in the early 21st century and is now in the care of the Friends of Friendless Churches.

St Michael's is a Grade I listed building. The adjacent vicarage, now derelict, and a mounting block in the churchyard have their own listings, the vicarage at Grade II* and the mounting block at Grade II.

== Sources ==
- Lloyd, Thomas; Orbach, Julian; Scourfield, Robert (2004). Pembrokeshire. The Buildings of Wales. New Haven, US and London: Yale University Press. ISBN 0300101783. OCLC 978065767.
