= Crow Rock =

Island in Pembrokeshire, Wales, United Kingdom

Coordinates: 51.612°N 5.055°W

Crow Rock is a rock located off of Linney Head, Pembrokeshire, in west Wales. The area is considered to be a good diving location because of its marine life and shipwrecks. Crow Rock is not more than 20 feet wide. The rock lies south of Stackpole and Castlemartin community, the most southerly in Pembrokeshire.

== Wrecks ==
Crow Rock has been the site of numerous reports of shipwreck, but only one has been confirmed by remains.

=== Confirmed by evidence ===
- Norwegian motor ferry Balholm, 26 February 1979. Lifeboat and lifejackets recovered. Location of wreck confirmed by divers.

=== Unconfirmed precise location ===
The following losses took place at or near Crow Rock, but evidence of the wrecks has not been confirmed by diving:

- Sailing vessel Berkeley Castle, 8 May 1824. The crew were saved. Location not confirmed.
- Wooden sailing vessel Elizabeth and Hannah, 7 March 1827. Crew saved. Location not confirmed.
- Schooner Catherine, 18 May 1873. Location not confirmed.
- Steamship Amelia, 28 October 1874. The Angle lifeboat rescued crew. Location not confirmed.
- SS Tormes, 30 October 1894. Location not confirmed.

== Marine life ==
The area around Crow Rock has exposed limestone reefs with rocky outcrops and gullies. Surveys in the 2010s reported the shallows to be covered in kelp and red algae and on the rock faces more than 20 species of sea squirt and 20 species of sea sponge were recorded. In 2016, a 'pink' candy striped flatworm (Prostheceraeus roseus) was spotted, the first to be the recorded in the UK, and in 2019 a curled octopus (Eledone cirrhosa) was recorded.
