= Stackpole and Castlemartin =

Community in Pembrokeshire, Wales

Coordinates: 51.63°N 4.98°W

- Community
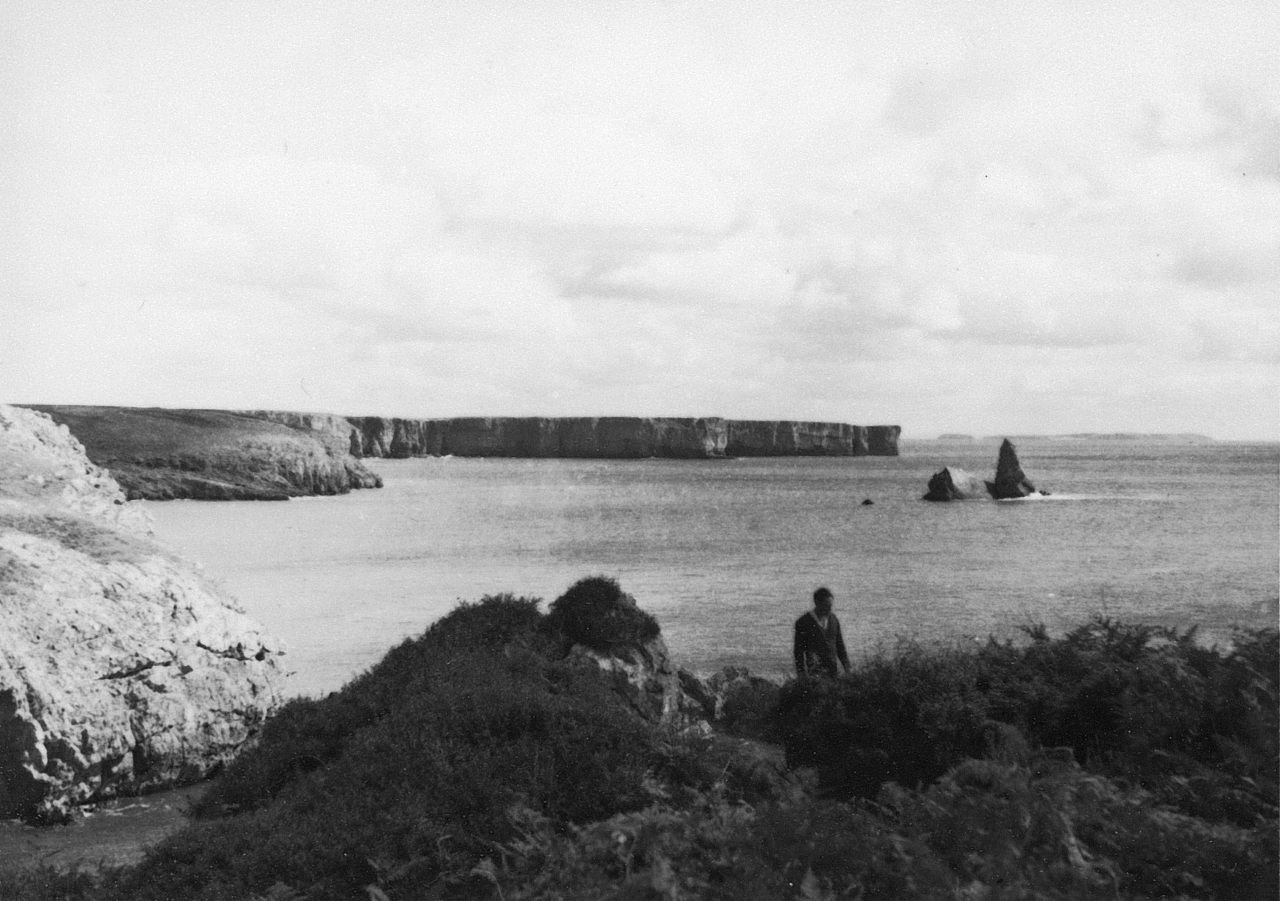
- View from near St Govan's Head in 1953

- Location within Pembrokeshire
- Principal area: Pembrokeshire
- Country: Wales
- Sovereign state: United Kingdom
- Police: Dyfed-Powys
- Fire: Mid and West Wales
- Ambulance: Welsh
- List of places UK Wales Pembrokeshire Map of the community

Stackpole and Castlemartin is a community in Pembrokeshire, Wales, 4 miles (6.4 km) south of Pembroke.

== History ==
Stackpole and Castlemartin Community was formed in 2011 by the amalgamation of the existing communities of Stackpole and Castlemartin, and includes a number of other smaller villages and ancient parishes in the area.

== Demographics ==
The population of the community in 2011 was 632, including Bosherston, Warren and St Twynnels. By the 2021 census this had fallen to 559.

== Features ==
=== Geography ===
The community lies mostly within the Pembrokeshire Coast National Park. Crow Rock, south of Linney Head, has been the site of numerous reports of shipwreck, at least two of which have been confirmed by remains. The coastal area between Castlemartin and Stackpole Warren features sand dunes that have covered Bronze Age and Iron Age remains, as well as limestone cliffs on which prehistoric fortifications were raised. These features have benefitted from protection by military activity in the area. The Stackpole coastal area was the subject of a seascape character assessment in 2020 in relation to proposed wind turbine constructions. The coast is popular for walking and climbing.

=== Military training ===
The community is the most southerly in Pembrokeshire, and includes the military Castlemartin Training Area for armoured fighting vehicles. The Pembrokeshire Coast Path diverts inland to avoid the area.

=== Listed buildings ===
There are 74 listed buildings in the community, including religious, agricultural and other buildings and structures.
