= Narberth Hundred =

Former Hundred in Pembrokeshire, Wales

Coordinates: 51.798°N 4.743°W

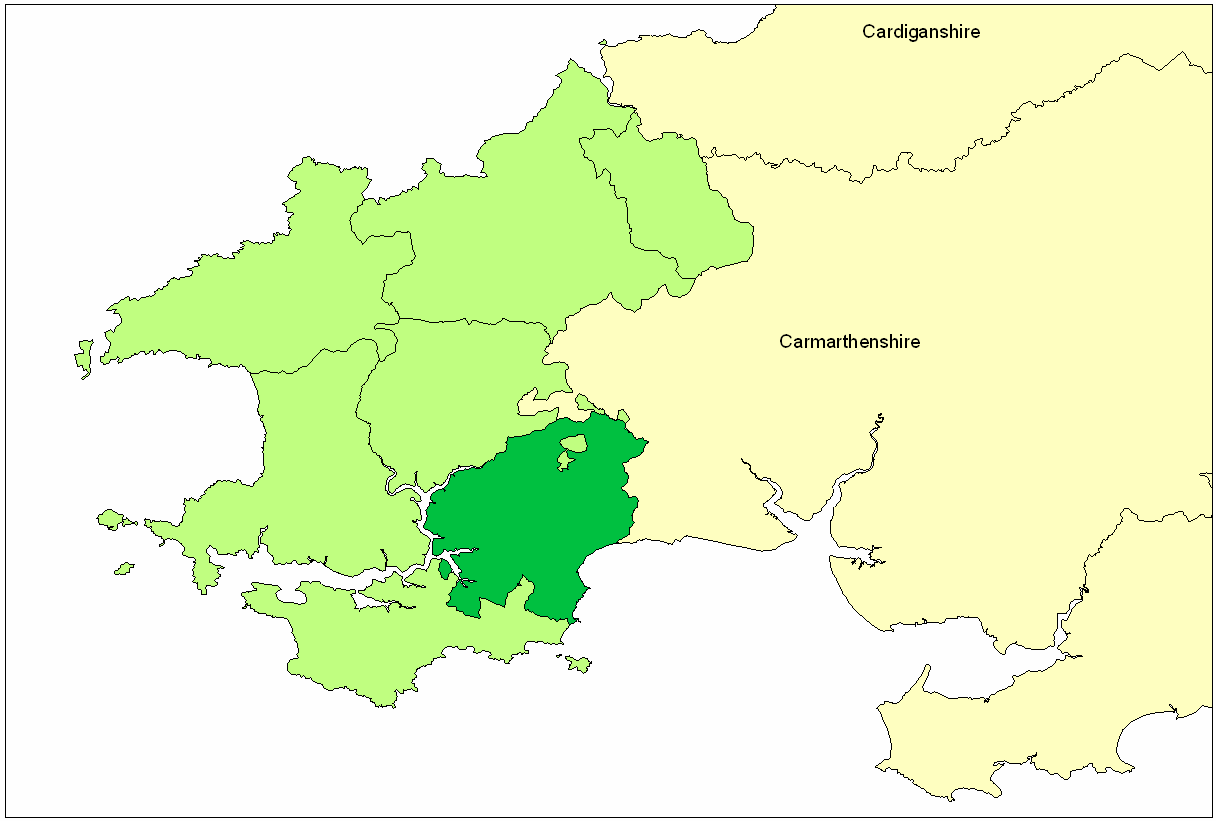
Pembrokeshire showing Narberth Hundred

The Hundred of Narberth was a hundred in Pembrokeshire, Wales. An administrative and legal division, it was formed by the Act of Union of 1536 from parts of the pre-Norman cantrefs of Penfro (the commote of Coedrath) and Cantref Gwarthaf (the commote of Efelfre).

== Name ==
It derived its Welsh name, Arberth, from the town and district of the same name, which means "(district) by the wood" (i.e. the forest of Coedrath), and which was the headquarters of the hundred.

== Region ==
The hundred spanned the linguistic boundary, with the parishes of Velfrey being identified by George Owen as Welsh-speaking, and the southern coastal part being English-speaking, part of Little England beyond Wales. The area in 1887 was 55,813 acres (22,587 ha).

== Demographics ==
The hundred incorporated twenty two parishes. The parliamentary election polling book for 1812 is held at the National Library of Wales. The 1821 census provided detailed demographics for the hundred. The total population was 11,321, living in 2,249 properties. At the 1831 census, the hundred had a population of 11,942 in 2,343 houses. The population was quoted as 11,469 in an 1887 gazetteer.

Land tax assessments for 1857 to 1949 are held at Pembrokeshire Archives.

== Discontinuation ==
The hundred courts declined from the 17th century, and most of their powers were extinguished with the establishment of county courts in 1867. Until 1974 Wales was divided into civil parishes, which to some extent coincided with ecclesiastical parishes, and in 1975 it was divided into communities. The jurisdiction of hundred courts was finally curtailed by the Administration of Justice Act 1977.
