= Penfro (cantref) =

Welsh medieval cantref

Coordinates: 51.674°N 4.908°W

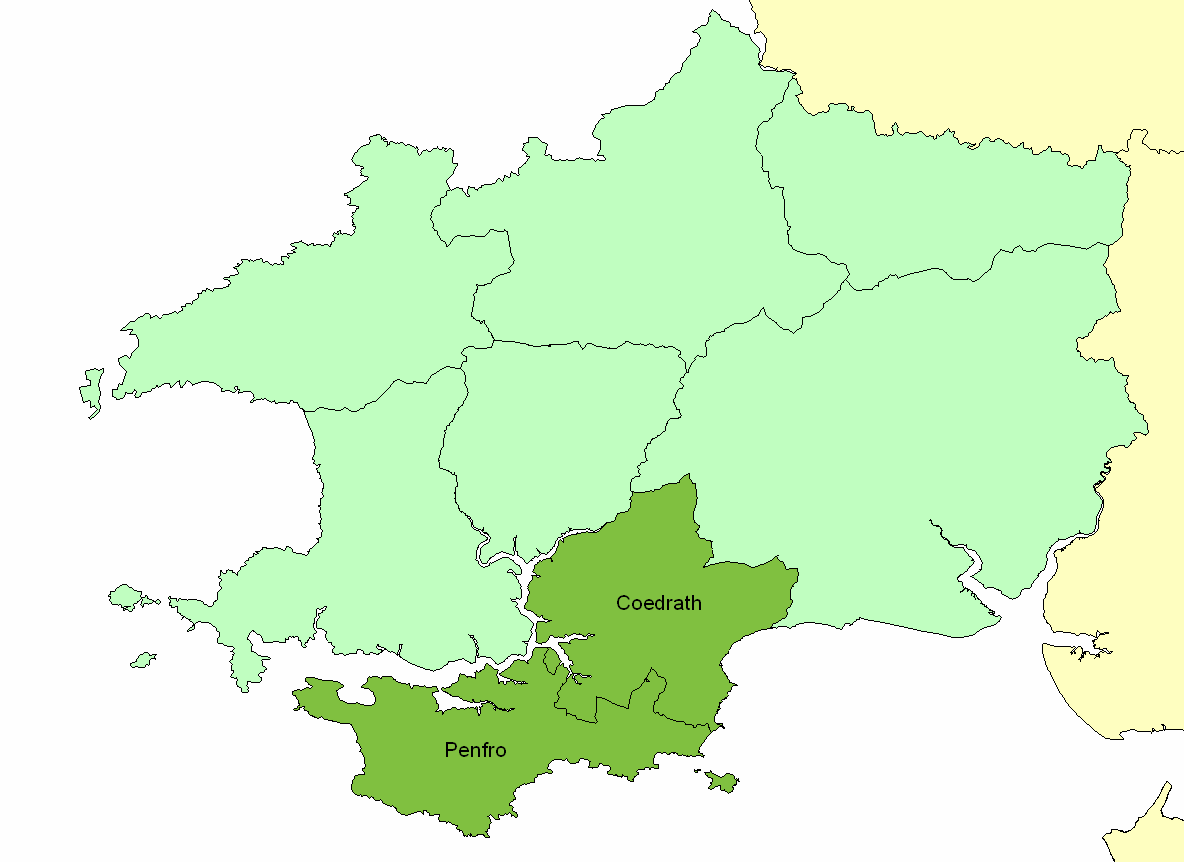
Location of the cantref of Penfro within ancient Dyfed

The Cantref of Penfro was one of the seven cantrefi of the Kingdom of Dyfed. It subsequently became part of Deheubarth in around 950. It consisted of the long peninsular part of Dyfed south of the Eastern Cleddau and the Daugleddau estuary, and bordered on its landward side by Cantref Gwarthaf. The name, meaning "land's end", derives from Pen ("end", literally "head") and "fro" ("populated area"). Its area was approximately 140 square miles (360 km^{2}).

It was divided into two commotes: Cwmwd Penfro in the southwest and Cwmwd Coedrath in the northeast, as shown in the map. The eastern part of Cwmwd Penfro was sometimes called Cwmwd Maenorbier, and the northern part of Cwmwd Coedrath was sometimes called Cwmwd Arberth, but both these were post-Norman lordships, and were probably not genuine commotes. Its civil headquarters were at Pembroke: Rhoscrowther or Penally might have been its ecclesiastical centre.

The cantref was made part of the Norman March in the 12th century, and many castles were built, including those of Carew, Manorbier, Narberth, Pembroke, and Tenby. The area became English-speaking, as it continues today, except in the northern part of Narberth parish.

At the time of the 1535 Acts of Union, the cantref was split between two newly formed hundreds, when Cwmwd Penfro became Castlemartin Hundred, and Cwmwd Coedrath was merged into Narberth Hundred.
