= Castlemartin Hundred =

Hundred in Pembrokeshire, Wales

Coordinates: 51.657°N 4.882°W

Castlemartin
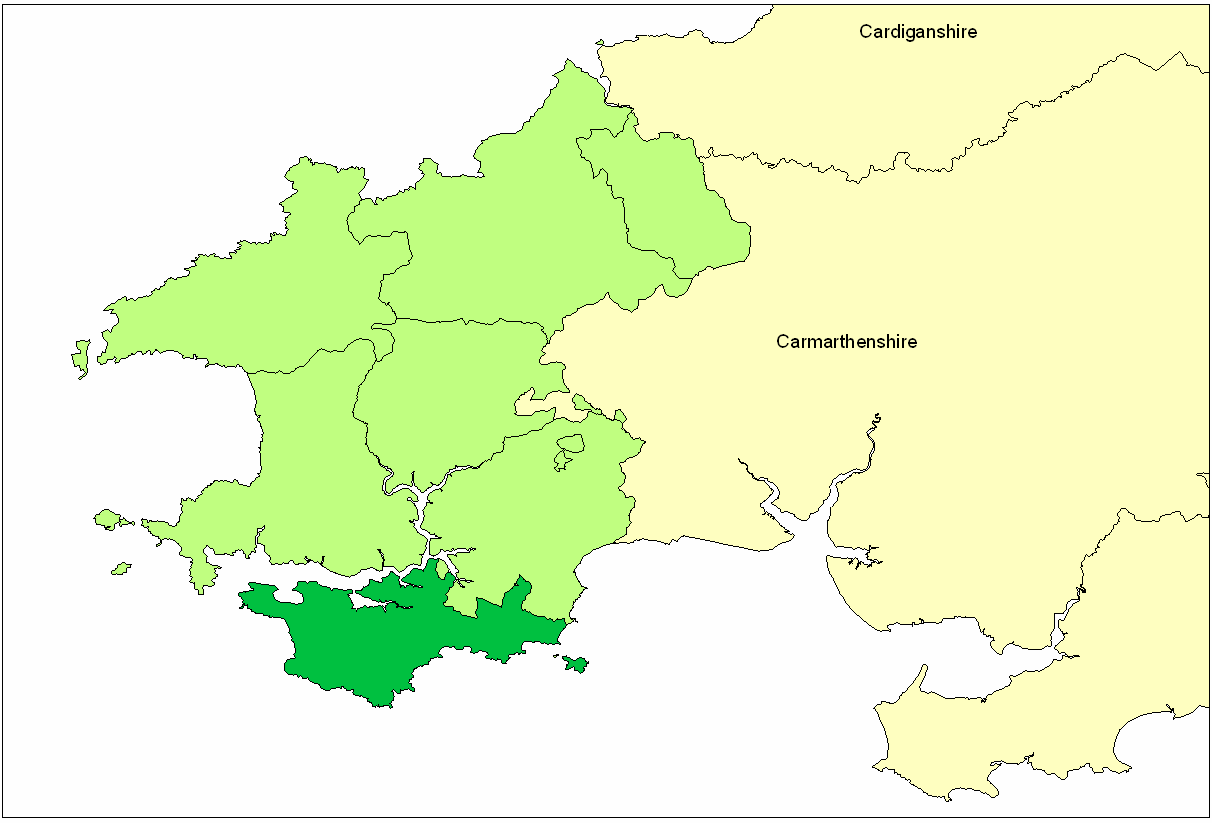
- Status: hundred
  - HQ: Pembroke

Castlemartin was one of seven ancient hundreds in Pembrokeshire, Wales.

== History ==
Initially created by the Marcher Lords of Pembroke in the 14th century from the western part of the pre-Norman Conquest cantref of Penfro, Castlemartin Hundred was confirmed by the Laws in Wales Acts 1535 and 1542.

Samuel Lewis, in his Topographical Dictionary of Wales notes:

The whole of the district abounds with numerous military works and fortifications, thrown up during the frequent contests which took place between the Danish pirates who infested this part of the coast, which, from its exposed and defenceless situation, was much subject to their attacks, and the native Welsh, who resolutely repelled their aggressions

Lewis believed the hundred, and the parish of the same name, derived from Martin of Tours.

The ruins of an ancient fort exist at Warren, as do several other ancient British and Danish remains along the coast.

Castlemartin Training Area, an artillery range, occupies part of the former hundred.

== Location and demography ==
The hundred's capital was at Pembroke. Since then it has been mostly English-speaking, and a part of west Wales formerly referred to as Little England beyond Wales, with the majority of its settlements retaining their English names. It comprised 21 parishes. Some of the area lies within the Pembrokeshire Coast National Park.
