= Castlemartin, Pembrokeshire =

Village and parish in Pembrokeshire, Wales

Coordinates: 51.65°N 5.01°W

Castlemartin: Welsh: Castell Martin
- Location within Pembrokeshire
- Population: 147
- OS grid reference: SR914984
- Community: Stackpole and Castlemartin
- Principal area: Pembrokeshire
- Country: Wales
- Sovereign state: United Kingdom
- Police: Dyfed-Powys
- Fire: Mid and West Wales
- Ambulance: Welsh

Castlemartin (Welsh: Castell Martin) is a village and parish in the community of Stackpole and Castlemartin, Pembrokeshire, Wales, in the Pembrokeshire Coast National Park.

The village is on a sandstone ridge, 5 miles (8.0 km) southwest of Pembroke, 4 miles (6.4 km) southeast of Angle, and reached on the B4319 road.

== Geography ==
In chronostratigraphy, the British sub-stage of the Carboniferous period, the 'Arundian' derives its name from Hobbyhorse Bay in the Castlemartin community—arundo being the Latin for hobby horse. Castlemartin has 8 miles (13 km) of coastline, much of it consisting of spectacular limestone cliffs characterised by large sea caves, natural arches and stacks.

== History ==
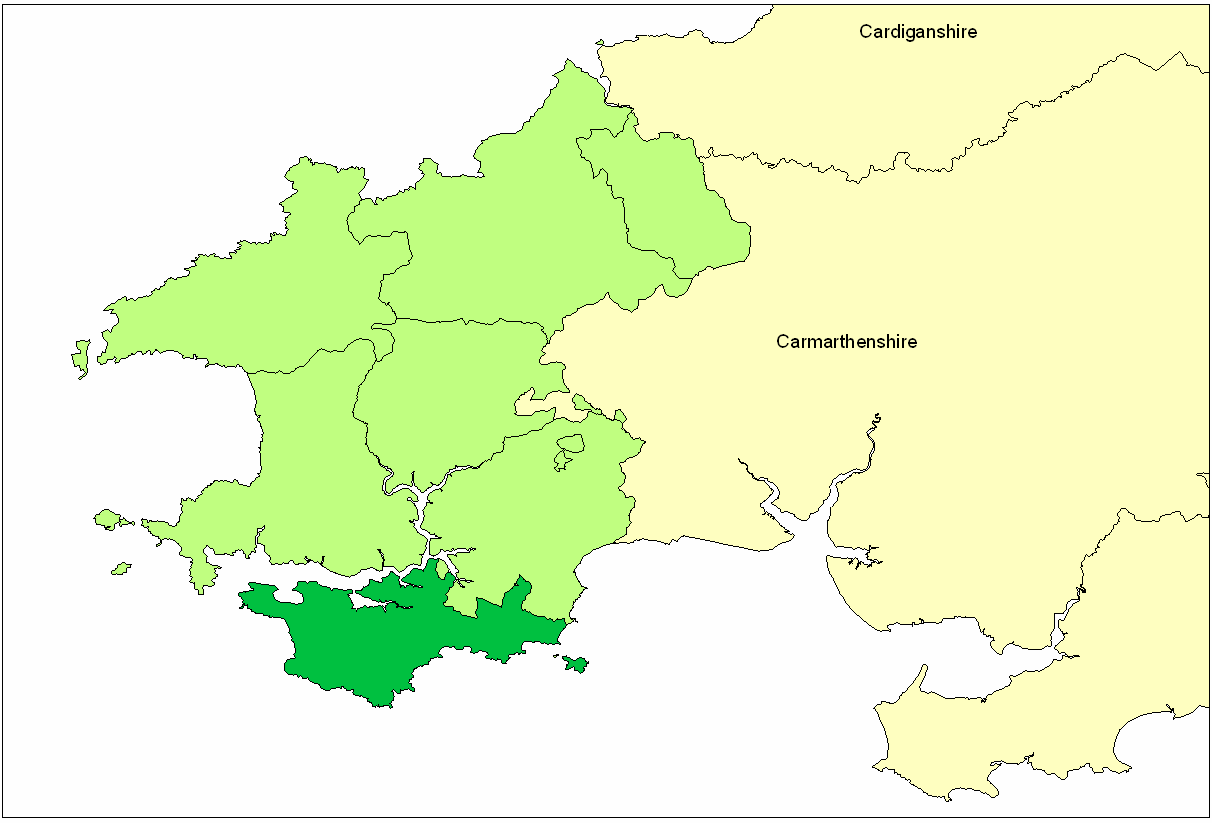
Pembrokeshire showing Castlemartin Hundred

The village of Castlemartin was in the ancient Hundred of the same name, once centred on a prominent Norman motte-and-bailey castle giving, with the church dedicated to St Martin, the origin of the name. Like other places in southern Pembrokeshire, Castlemartin has been mainly English-speaking for 900 years or more.

A 1583 map in the British Library shows Castlemartin parish as Castlemerten.

The census population of Castlemartin was 496 (1801): 528 (1851): 460 (1901): 243 (1951): 147 (2001).

During the 20th century, much of the land in the community area was cleared by the government for use as an artillery range: Castlemartin Training Area, with its base at Merrion, in Warren. Here, the Pembrokeshire Coast Path has to run inland; by-passing many interesting sections of cliff, although sometimes access may be offered to Flimston. In 2011, the MoD opened up a special diversionary route which was safer for walkers by protecting them from the range fire and preventing them for having to negotiate narrow country roads with fast moving traffic.

Castlemartin community amalgamated with Stackpole community in 2012, forming Stackpole and Castlemartin community.

== Parish church ==
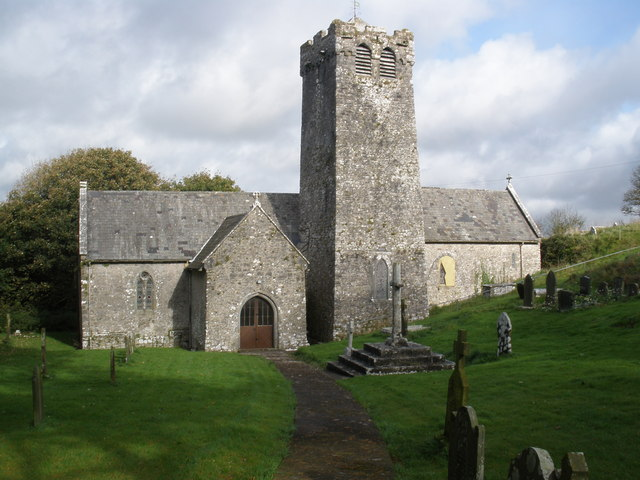
St Michael's Church

The parish church of St Michael is a Grade I listed building. It contains a cross-inscribed stone pillar of the 7th century-9th century. Currently, the church is closed. The church was declared redundant and vested with the Friends of Friendless Churches in 2016.
