= Gulu (disambiguation) =

Gulu may refer to:

== Places ==
- Gulu, a town in northern Uganda.
  - Gulu University
- Gulu District, in which the Ugandan town is located.
  - Gulu Airport, serving Gulu town.
  - Roman Catholic Archdiocese of Gulu
- Gulu Nature Reserve, Wild Coast, Eastern Cape, South Africa
- Gulu railway station on the Qingzang Railway in the Tibetan Autonomous Region of the People's Republic of China

== People ==
- Gulu Asgarov (1928–1987), Azeri opera singer
- Gulu Ezekiel, Indian journalist
- Gulu Khalilov (1930–1995), Azeri journalist
- Gulu Lalvani (born 1939), founder and chairman of Binatone, a phone manufacturer
- Gulu or Gullu, nickname of Indian actress Aishwarya Rai
- Kharrat Gulu (1823–1883), Azeri musicologist

== See also ==
- Gulu Gulu, a 2022 Indian film
- Gullu Dada, a fictional character portrayed by Indian actor Adnan Sajid Khan
- Gulou (disambiguation)
