= Poladlı =

Poladlı or Poladly or Polatlu or Polatly may refer to:

- Poladlı, Agdam, Azerbaijan
- Poladlı, Aghjabadi, Azerbaijan
- Poladlı, Gadabay, Azerbaijan
- Poladlı, Gobustan, Azerbaijan
- Poladlı, Qubadli, Azerbaijan
- Poladlı, Tartar, Azerbaijan
