= Gułów =

Gułów may refer to the following places in Poland:

- Gułów, Lower Silesian Voivodeship (south-west Poland)
- Gułów, Lublin Voivodeship (east Poland)

== See also ==
- Gulowa Island
- Gulov
- Gulou (disambiguation)
- Gulo (disambiguation)
