= Gulo (disambiguation) =

GULO or gulo may refer to:

== In general ==
- Gulo, a genus of mammal, from the subfamily Guloninae
  - Gulo gulo (G. gulo), the wolverine
    - Gulo gulo gulo (G. g. gulo), the Old World wolverine
- L-gulonolactone oxidase (GULO), an enzyme
  - GULO, a gene encoding for L-gulonolactone oxidase

== People ==
- Gul Mohammad Pahalwan, 1990s Uzbek leader known as Gulo
- Aleksei Gulo (born 1973), Russian footballer
- John Gulo, American pickleballer

== Fictional characters ==
- Gulo the Savage, a fictional character from the 2004 Brian Jacques novel Rakkety Tam
- Gulo, a Marvel Comics character; see List of Marvel Comics characters: L
- Gulo, a fictional character from the 1978 Turkish film Kibar Feyzo
- Gulo, a fictional character from the 2019 videogame Rage 2
- Gulo, a fictional character from the TV show Wild Kratts; see List of Wild Kratts episodes

== TV episodes ==
- "Gulo", a 2022 TV episode of the TV show Love in 40 Days; see List of Love in 40 Days episodes
- "Gulo" (Filipino: commotion, trouble), a 2019 TV episode of The General's Daughter; see List of The General's Daughter episodes
- "Gulo" (Tagalog: commotion, trouble), a 2017 episode of the TV show A Love to Last; see List of A Love to Last episodes

== Other uses ==
- -gulo (Bengali: -গুলো), a plural suffix in the Bengali language

== See also ==
- Vestia gulo (V. gulo), a species of land snail
- Kaloplocamus gulo (K. gulo), a species of sea slug
- The dictionary definition of -গুলো at Wiktionary
- Gulou (disambiguation)
- Gułów (disambiguation)
