= Drum Tower =

Drum Tower or drum tower may refer to:

- Drum tower (Asia), a tower in the center of an old Asian city - in Chinese: gulou
- Drum tower (Chinese Buddhism), a type of building within a Chinese Buddhist temple
- Drum tower (Europe), a shape of tower in some European castles
- Drum Tower (Bangkok), a historic tower in Bangkok

== See also ==
- Gulou (disambiguation)
