= Cilgerran Castle =

Ruined castle in Pembrokeshire, Wales

Coordinates: 52°3′26″N 4°38′3″W

- Castell Cilgerran (Welsh) (Note: Since 2024, Cadw, who are guardians of the site, use the Welsh name only.)
- Cilgerran, Pembrokeshire, Wales
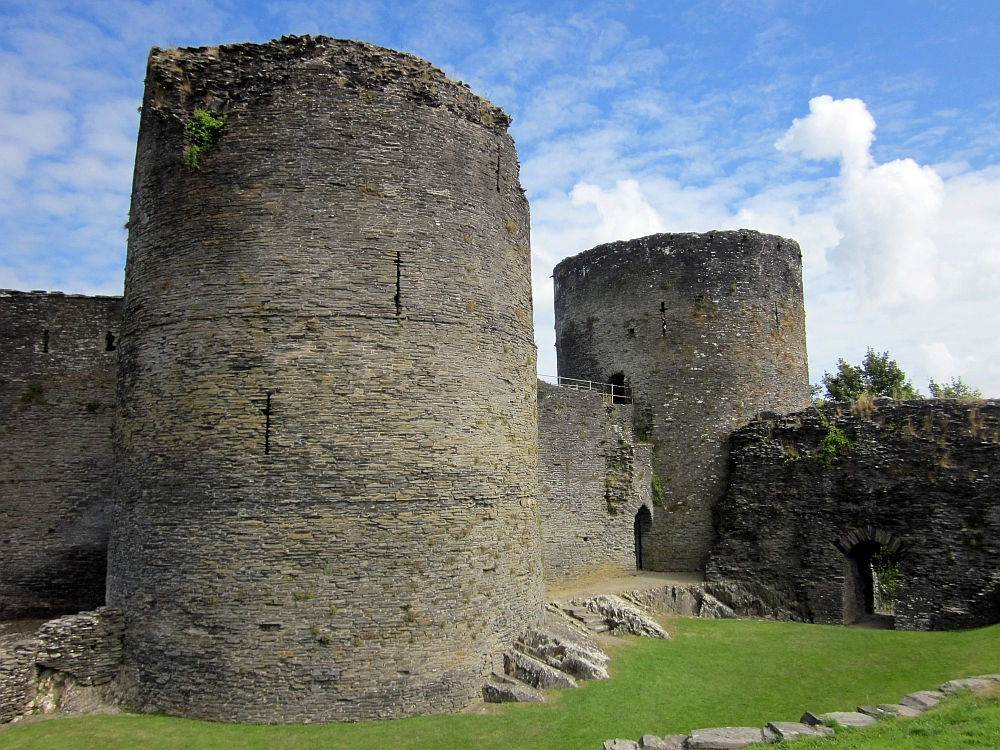
- West tower, and access bridge to the inner ward over gully

Site information
- Type: Castle
- Owner: National Trust
- Controlled by: Cadw (guardianship)
- Website: Cilgerran Castle (National Trust); Castell Cilgerran (Cadw)

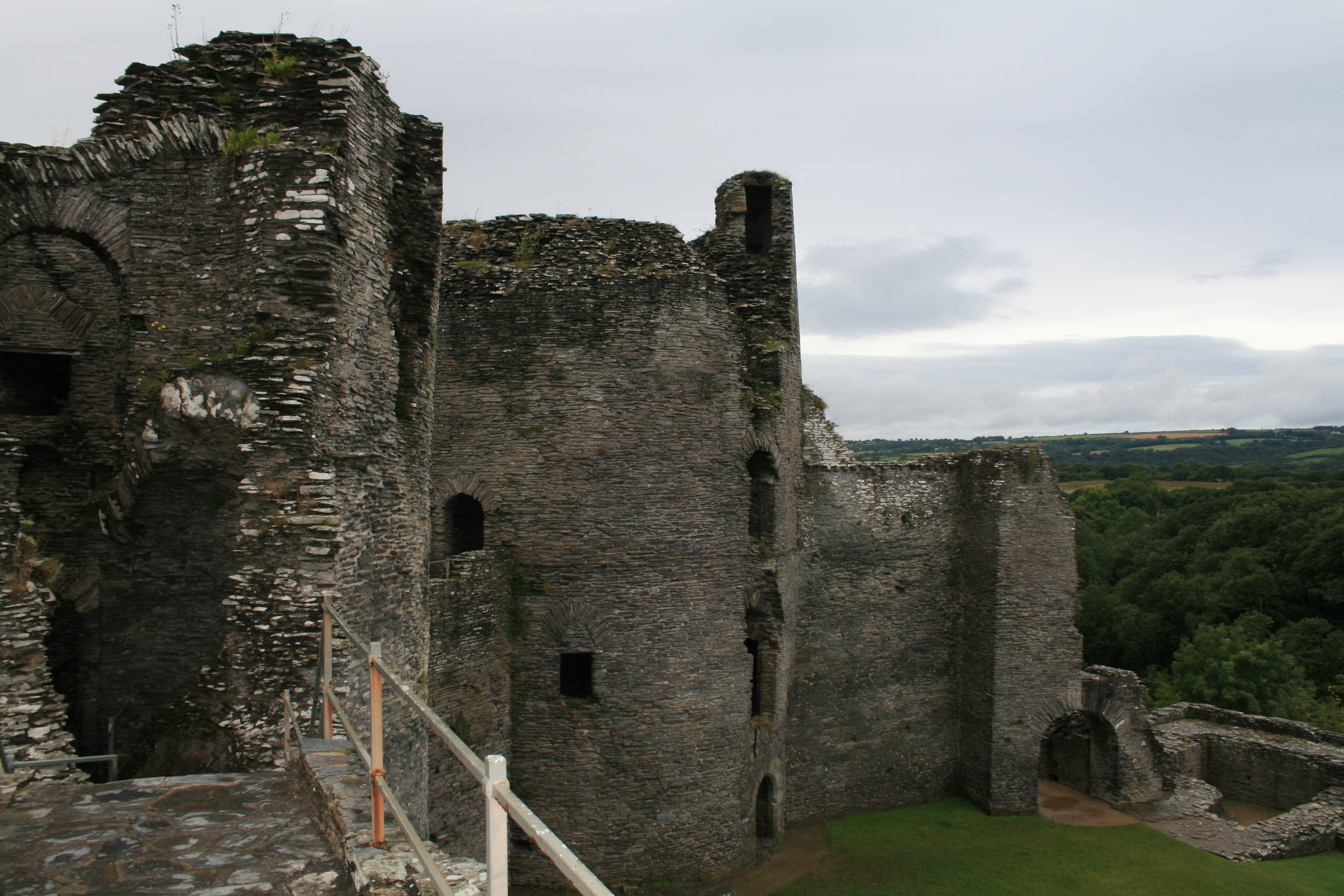
Cilgerran Castle, Pembrokeshire

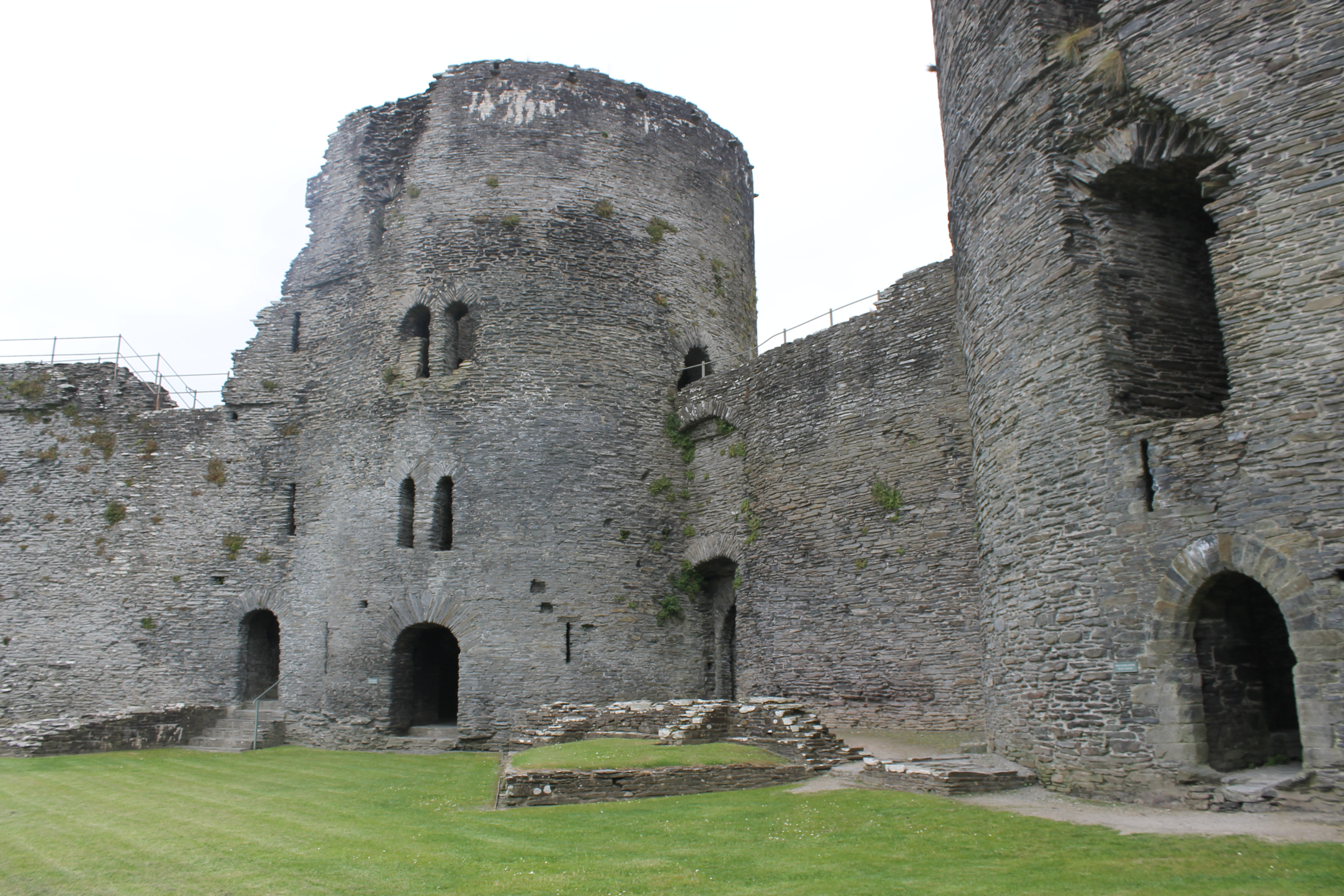
Cilgerran Castle, the towers

Cilgerran Castle (Welsh: Castell Cilgerran) is a 13th-century ruined castle located in Cilgerran, Pembrokeshire, Wales, near Cardigan. The first castle on the site was thought to have been built by Gerald of Windsor around 1110–1115, and it changed hands several times over the following century between English and Welsh forces. In the hands of William Marshal, 2nd Earl of Pembroke, the construction of the stone castle began after 1223.

After passing through successive families, it was left to ruin and eventually abandoned by 1400. The castle backs onto a cliff face, with the remaining ruins dating from the 13th century. It was most heavily fortified where it faces inland, and includes a pair of drum towers, rather than a central keep, which remain standing. It passed into the hands of the National Trust in 1938, while Cadw holds the guardianship. It is open to the public and entry is free. Opening times vary.

== Description ==
The castle sits on a rocky promontory above the River Teifi, with one side directly onto a cliff face. An earth and timber castle is believed to have existed prior to the current building, but was destroyed by Welsh forces. The existing masonry dates from around 13th century. The walls facing the cliff top were the least heavily fortified, with the defences concentrated on those that faced inland. These comprised two lines of defence, with an outer bailey and two drum towers rather than a central keep as typically seen in other castles of this period. The gatehouse is located in the south east of the building, and only partly remains. A ditch around the outside of the castle was cut from the rock face, which is thought to have once been spanned by a pivoting bridge. Cilgerran Castle is the most northerly of all castles in Pembrokeshire. It is twinned with Cardigan Castle, located on the opposite bank of the river 3 miles (4.8 km) downstream.

The castle is largely ruinous, though the two substantial towers remain. From the castle there are walks down to the River Teifi. The castle is a National Trust property, in the guardianship of Cadw: Welsh Historic Monuments Executive Agency. It is open to the public under their auspices, and in 2015 it was the site of a re-enactment of the Battle of Agincourt to mark the 600th anniversary.

== History ==
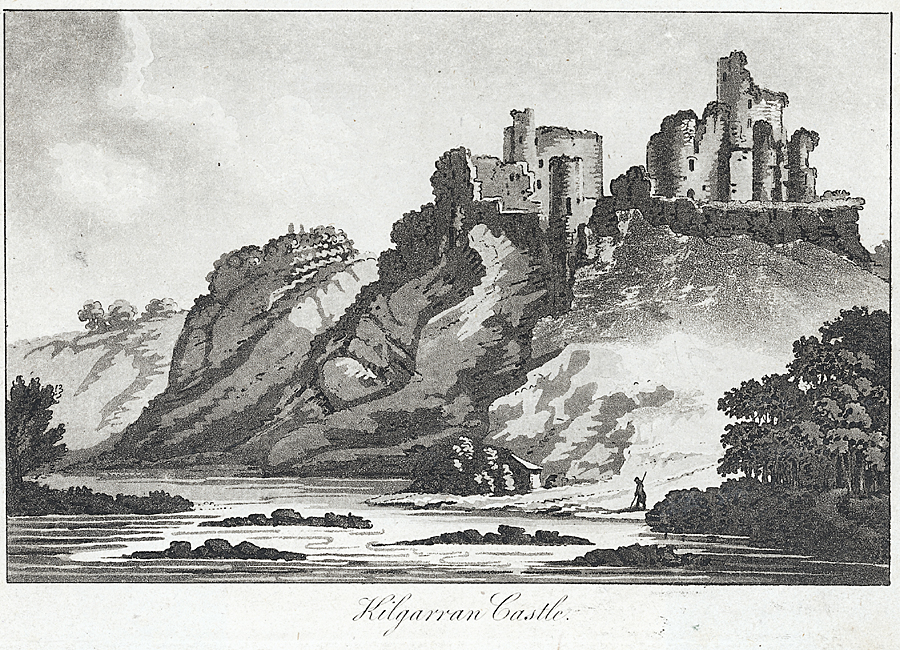
'Kilgarran Castle', 1795

The initial Cilgerran Castle was built by Gerald of Windsor around 1110–1115, but was little more than a wooden palisade. This was replaced by a stone outer wall at some point prior to the attack by Rhys ap Gruffydd in 1165. Rhys had taken Cardigan Castle a matter of weeks before, and upon the capture of Cilgerran Castle, he destroyed it entirely. He began a reconstruction effort, using stone and lime mortar. In 1204, it was taken back for the English by William Marshal, 1st Earl of Pembroke, who drove out Rhys' son, Maelgwn ap Rhys. Marshal set about making repairs, but these proved ineffective as it was taken once more in 1215 Llywelyn the Great after a single day's battle.

It was recaptured by William Marshal, 2nd Earl of Pembroke, in 1223. He began the rebuilding of the castle into its present form, which was later completed by the de Cantilupe family. The size of the stones used in the parts of the castle remaining from this period indicate that it was built at great haste. Cilgerran was not taken by Welsh forces after this period, although in 1258 when English forces were defeated nearby, the castle had to push back the forces of the Princes of Deheubarth. Following the death of Anselm Marshal, 6th Earl of Pembroke, it passed via a co-heiress to the de Cantilupe family.

It passed again in 1272 after end of that line, to the Hastings family. But Cilgerran Castle was allowed to go to ruin by 1387, and was thought to be deserted by 1400. But the property continued to be passed down through the Earls of Pembroke into the time of Jasper Tudor, Duke of Bedford. In 1509, Gruffudd Vychan was named Steward of the Lordship of Cilgerran and Constable of Cilgerran Castle.

It has been the subject of several paintings, including Kilgarran Castle on the Twyvey; Hazy Sunrise, previous to a Sultry Day, Cilgerran Castle on the Teifi, Looking Upstream, and View in Wales: Mountain Scene with Village and Castle – Evening, each by J. M. W. Turner which are all in the national collection at the Tate Museum.

The 19th century saw continued decline of the castle, the dry ditch bailey being converted into the village pound and the curtain wall of the bailey falling due to slate quarrying in the area in 1863. In 1938, it was presented to the National Trust. Since 2024, Cadw have used the Welsh name Castell Cilgerran in English, as part of an effort to standardise the names in both languages.

Cilgerran Castle

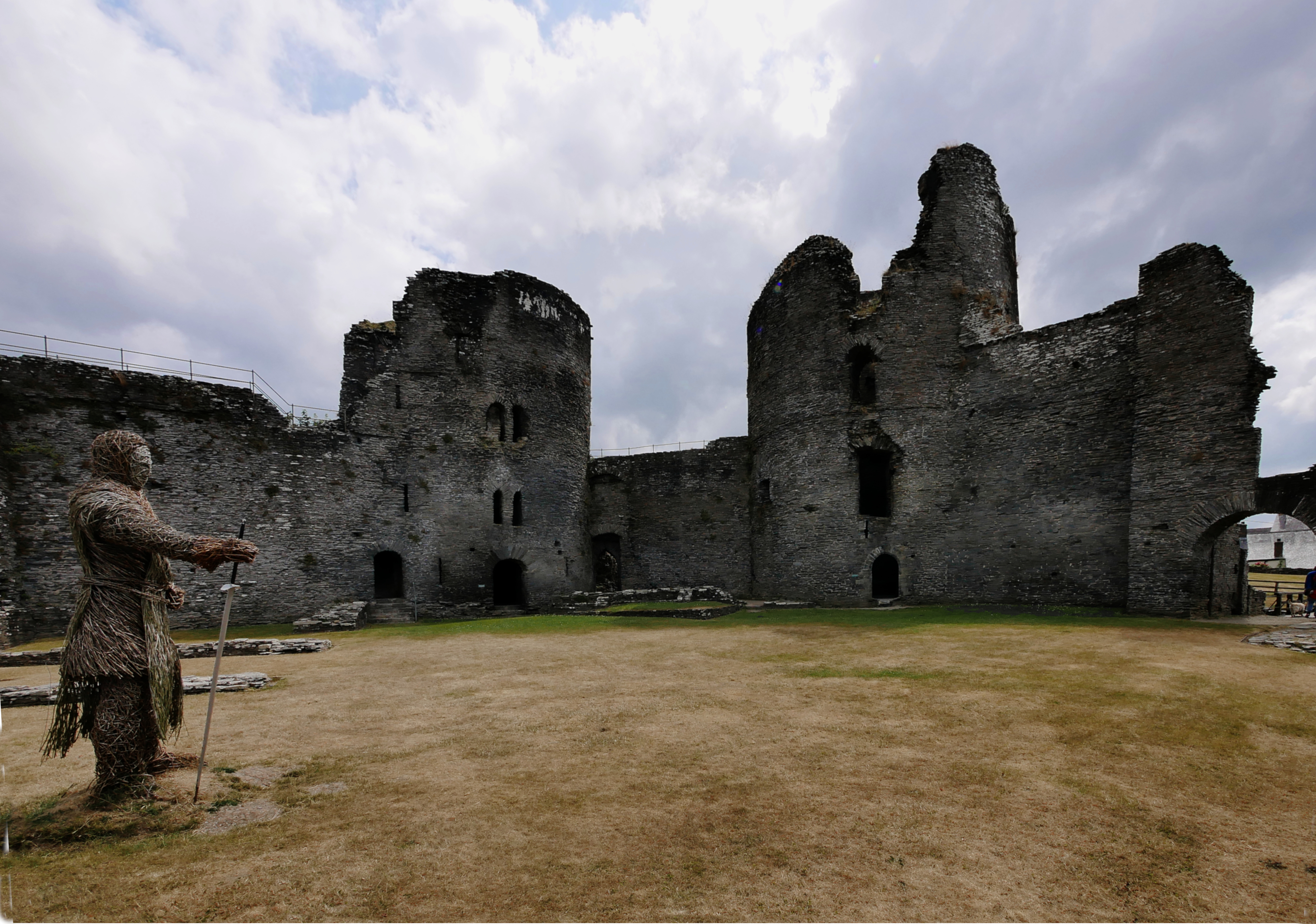

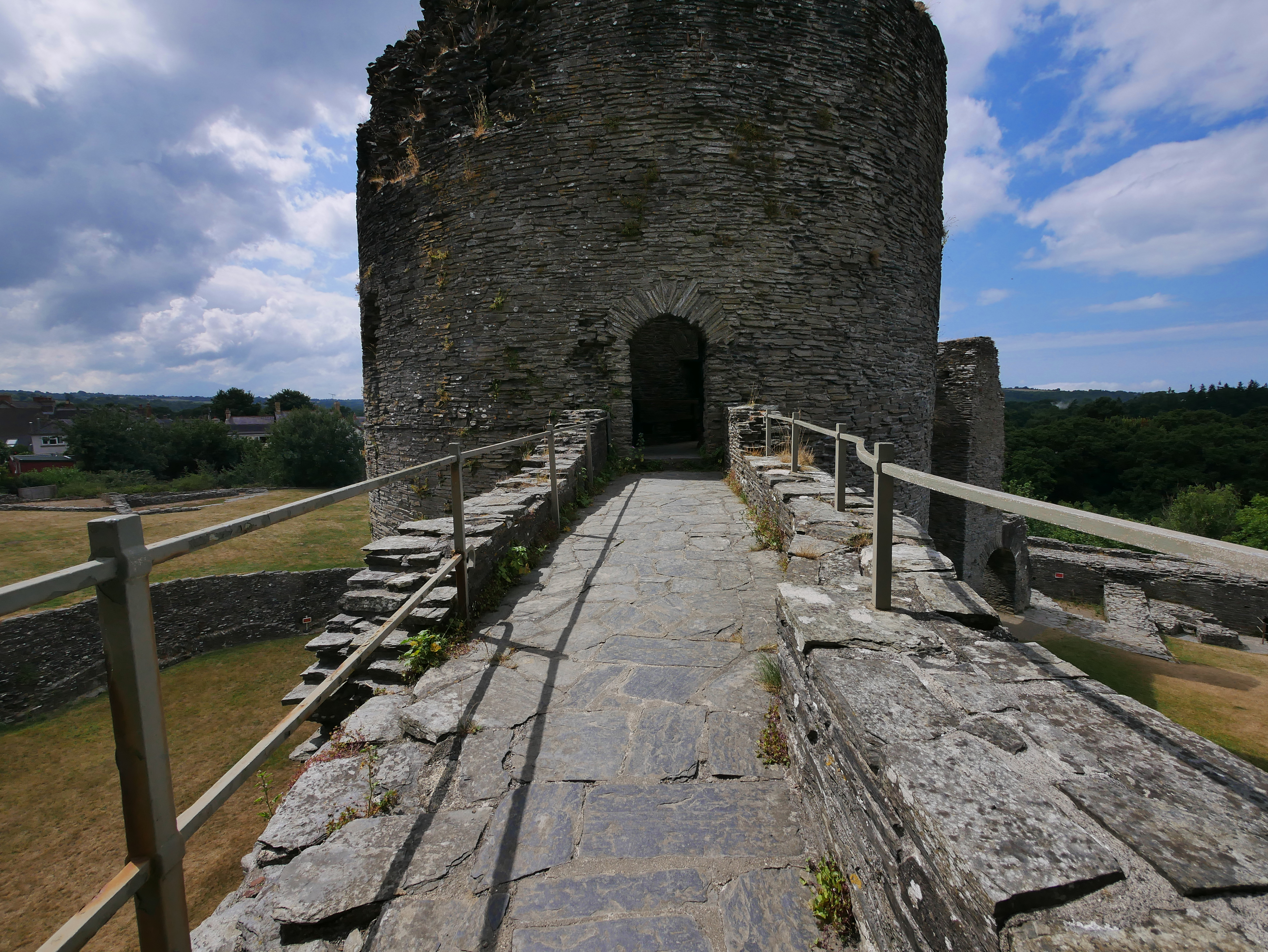

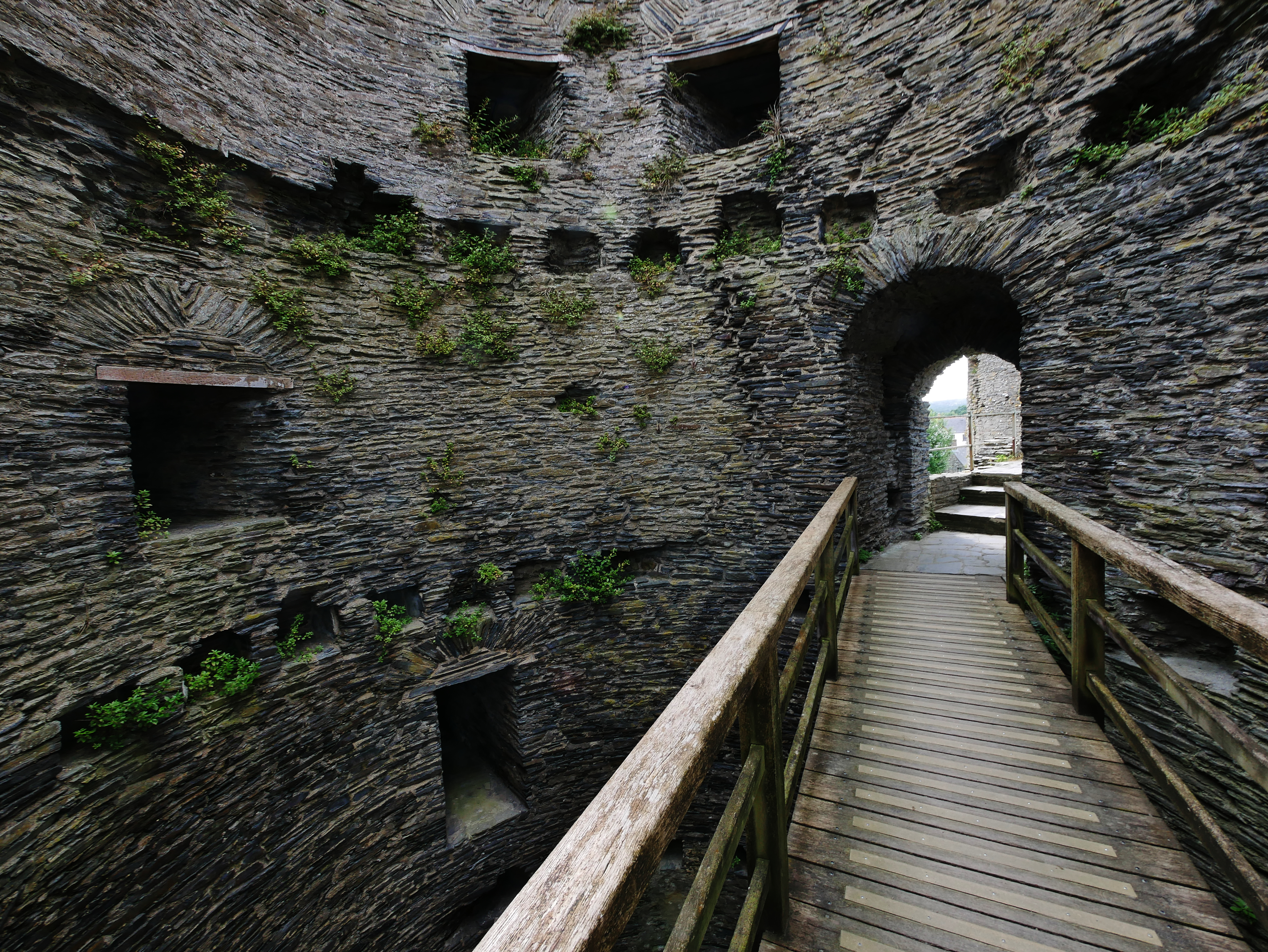

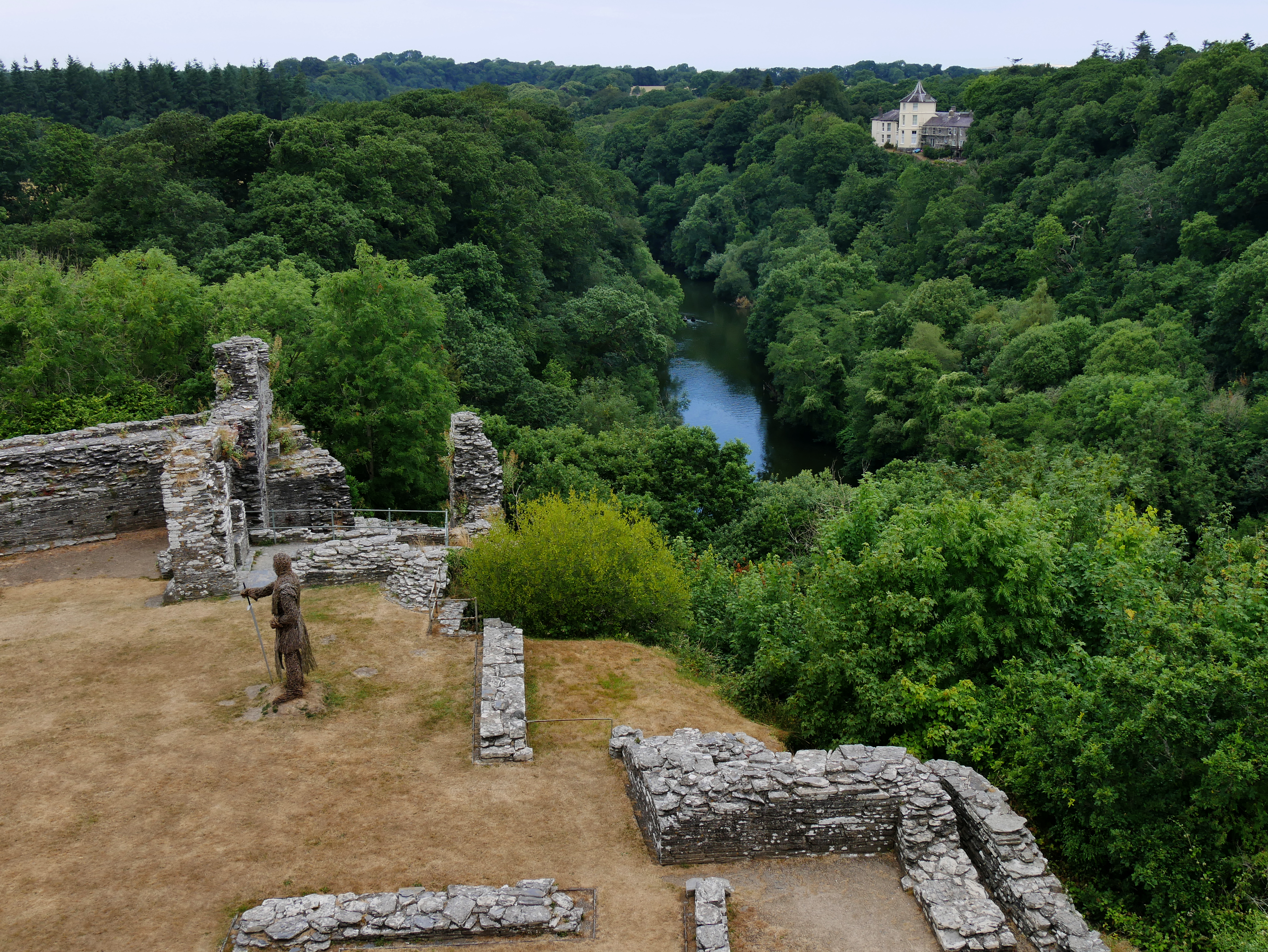

== Gallery ==
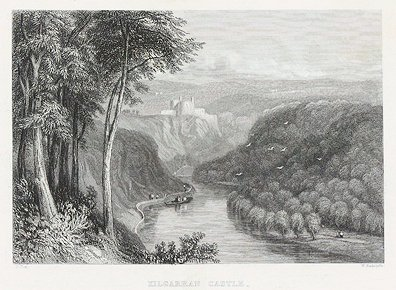
'Kilgarran castle: on the river Teivy', 1844 by artist David Cox, 1783-1859 and engraver William Radclyffe, 1783-1855

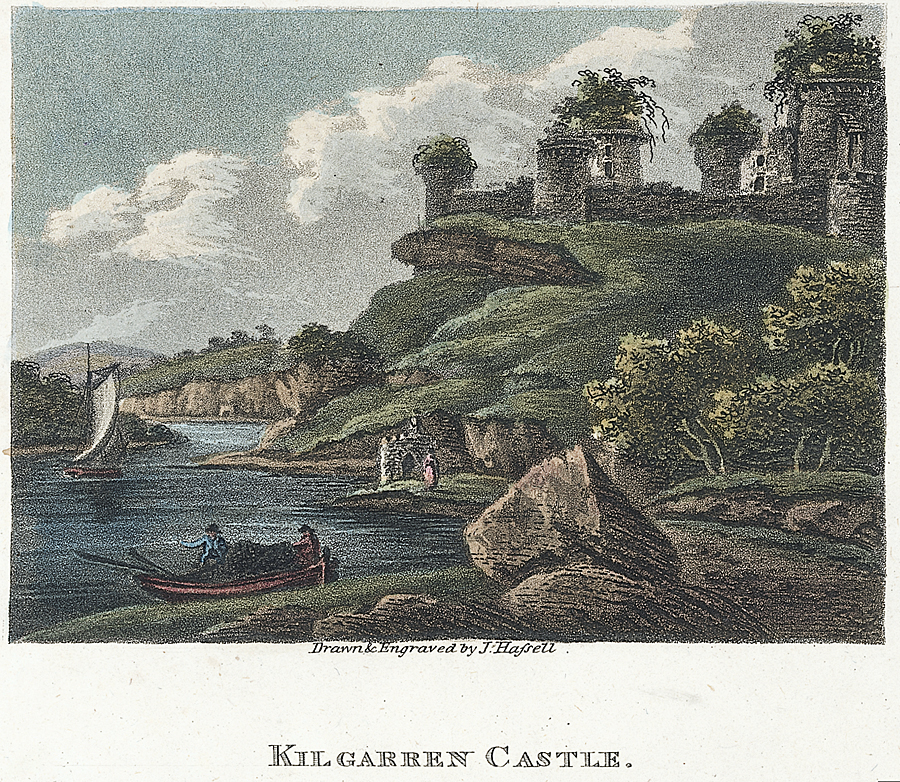
'Kilgarren Castle', 1807 by J. (John) Hassell, 1767-1825

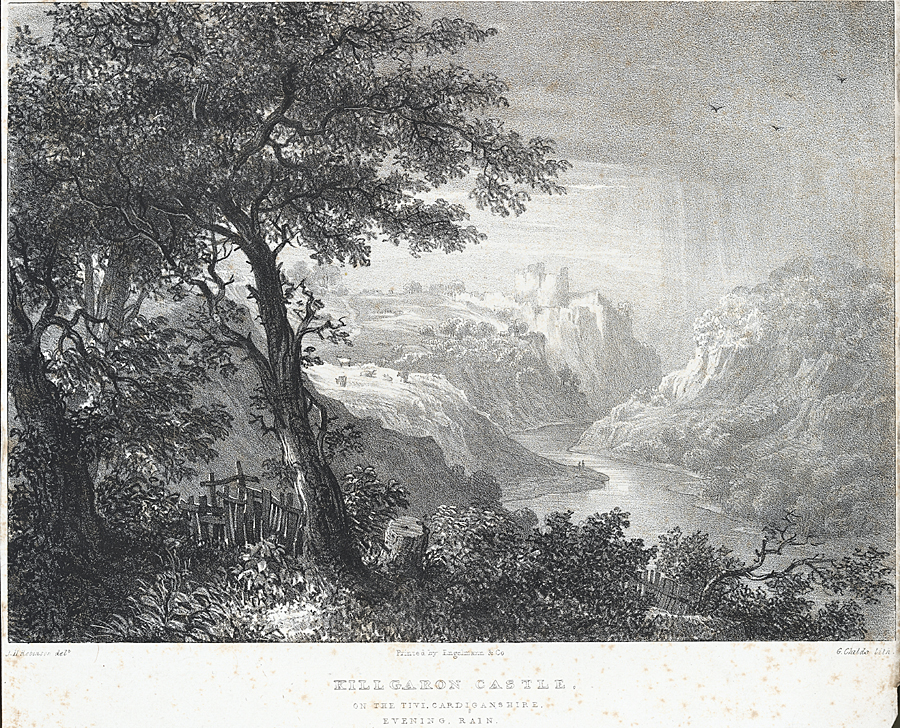
'Killgaron Castle: on the Tivi, Cardiganshire, evening rain' ca 1845 by John Henry Robinson, 1796-1871 and George Childs, fl. 1826-1873

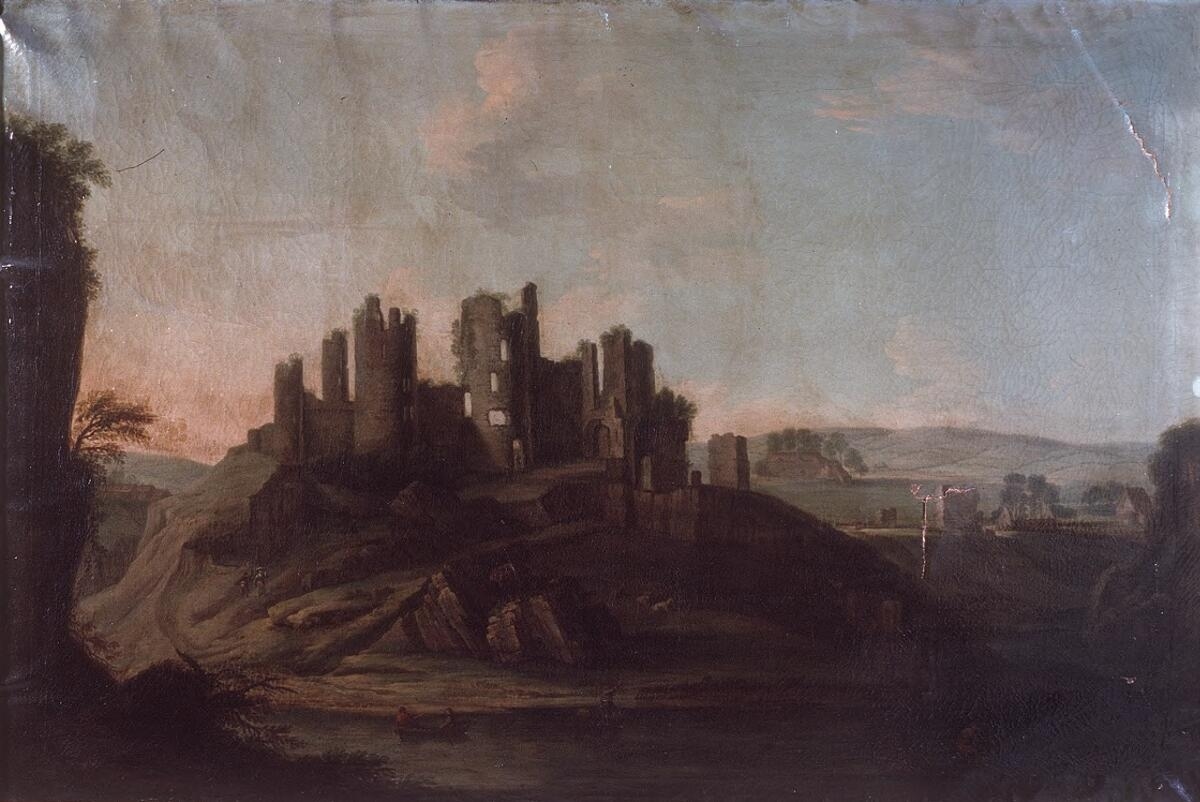
Anonymous painting c.1800-1820

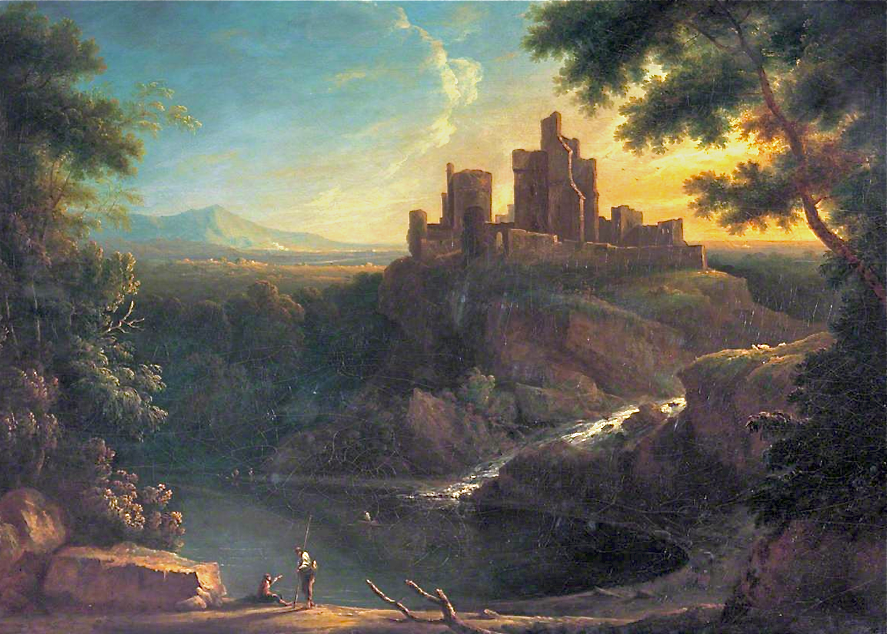
Cilgerran Castle by George Barret circa 1778

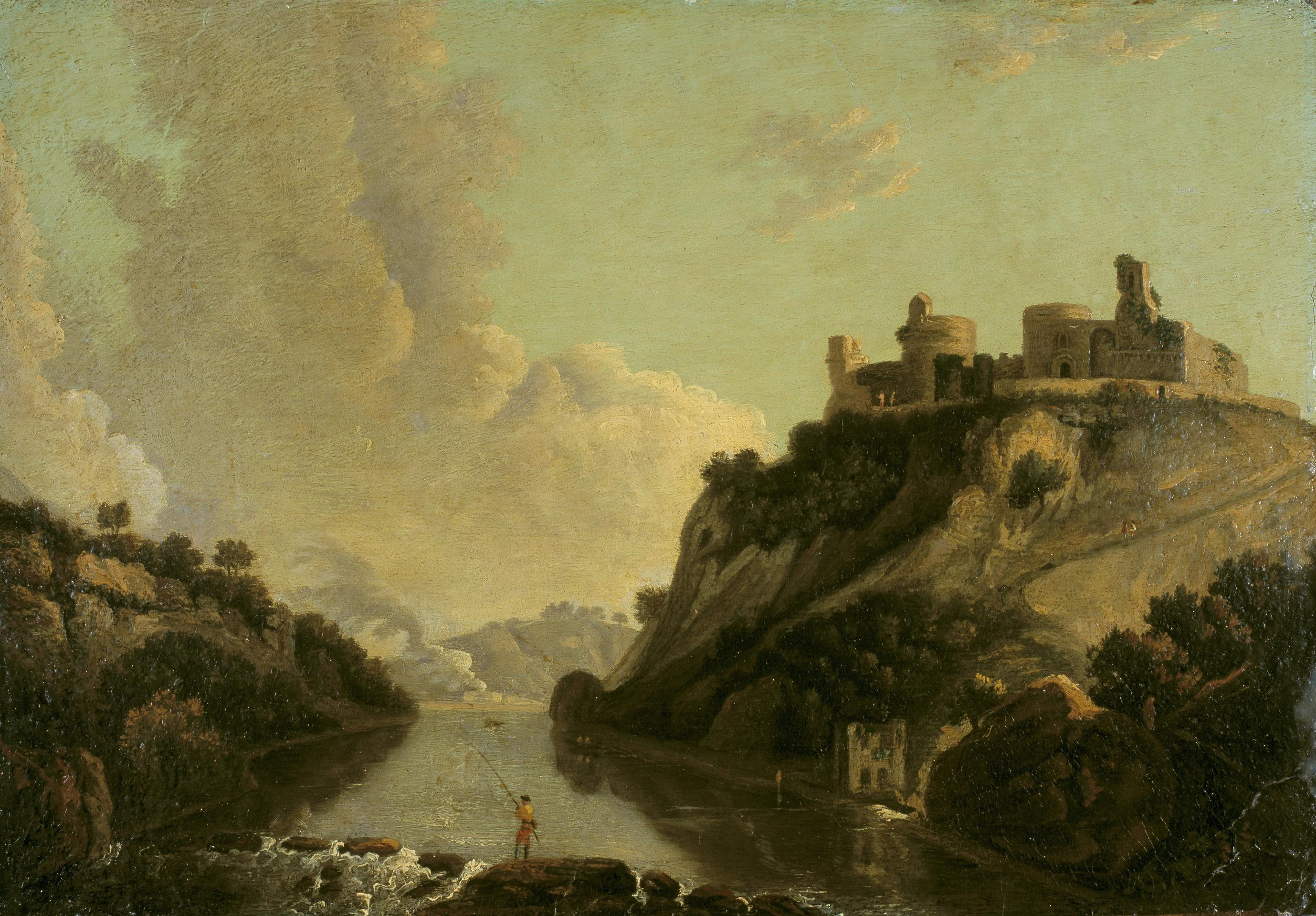
Cilgerran Castle, given by Lord Pontypridd
