= Llantood =

Hamlet and parish in Pembrokeshire, Wales

Coordinates: 52.0333°N 4.7°W

Llantood: Welsh: Llantwyd
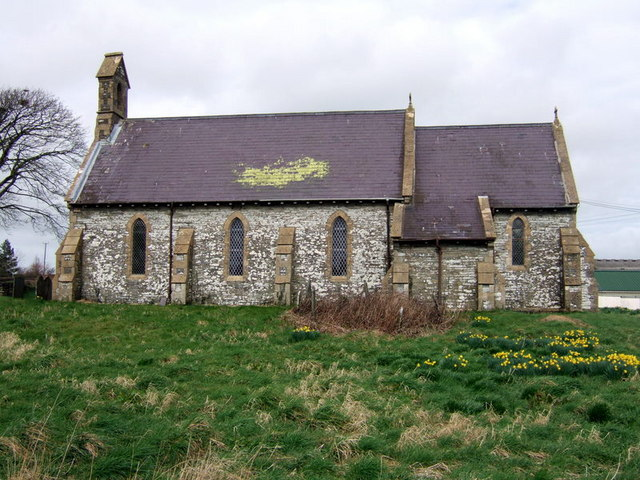
- Parish church of St Illtud

- Location within Pembrokeshire
- Community: Cilgerran
- Principal area: Pembrokeshire
- Country: Wales
- Sovereign state: United Kingdom
- Post town: Cardigan, Ceredigion
- Postcode district: SA43
- Dialling code: 01239
- Police: Dyfed-Powys
- Fire: Mid and West Wales
- Ambulance: Welsh
- UK Parliament: Preseli Pembrokeshire
- Senedd Cymru – Welsh Parliament: Preseli Pembrokeshire

Llantood (Welsh: Llantwd; formerly Llantyd, Llantwyd or Llan-Illtyd) is a hamlet and parish in Cilgerran community, north Pembrokeshire, Wales.

== Location ==
Llantood is 3 miles (4.8 km) south-west of Cardigan on the A487 Cardigan to Newport road near the north Pembrokeshire coast. It consists of a few houses, farms and a parish church on an open hill agricultural area averaging 150 metres (490 ft) above sea level. Nearby settlements include Bridell, Glanrhyd, Monington, Pontgarreg and Tygwyn.

== History ==
Evidence of prehistoric occupation can be seen by the remains of fortifications at Penralltddu, a scheduled monument, and at Castell Felinganol (or Castellfelorganol).

The name of the hamlet is assumed to derive from the 5th century saint, Illtyd, to whom the parish church is now dedicated. Church records date back to 1674, and the parish was in the Hundred of Kilgerran (formed in 1536) even though it was in the Cemais administrative area. The region was occupied by the Normans in the 12th century, who built castles at several strategic locations in the area; the clear remains of a motte and bailey exists at Castell Penyrallt (or Castell Pen-yr-allt). A clergyman in 1864 remembered stonework on the latter, but this was no longer evident at the time of the 1925 Royal Commission. The Norman structure may have reused a prehistoric fort.

The name of the parish church was Langetot in the Taxatio of 1293, as Langettod in the St David's episcopal register of 1513, and appears on a 1578 parish map of Pembrokeshire as Llantwood. The attachment to St Illtyd may therefore be of later origin.

In 1870, Llantwyd was listed in Wilson's Gazetteer as consisting of 1,792 acres (725 ha), 61 houses and a population of 264.

== Significant buildings ==
=== Parish church ===
The present parish church of St Illtud dates from 1884, replacing an earlier church of 1820. Stones in the porch suggest there was a church as far back as the 13th century.

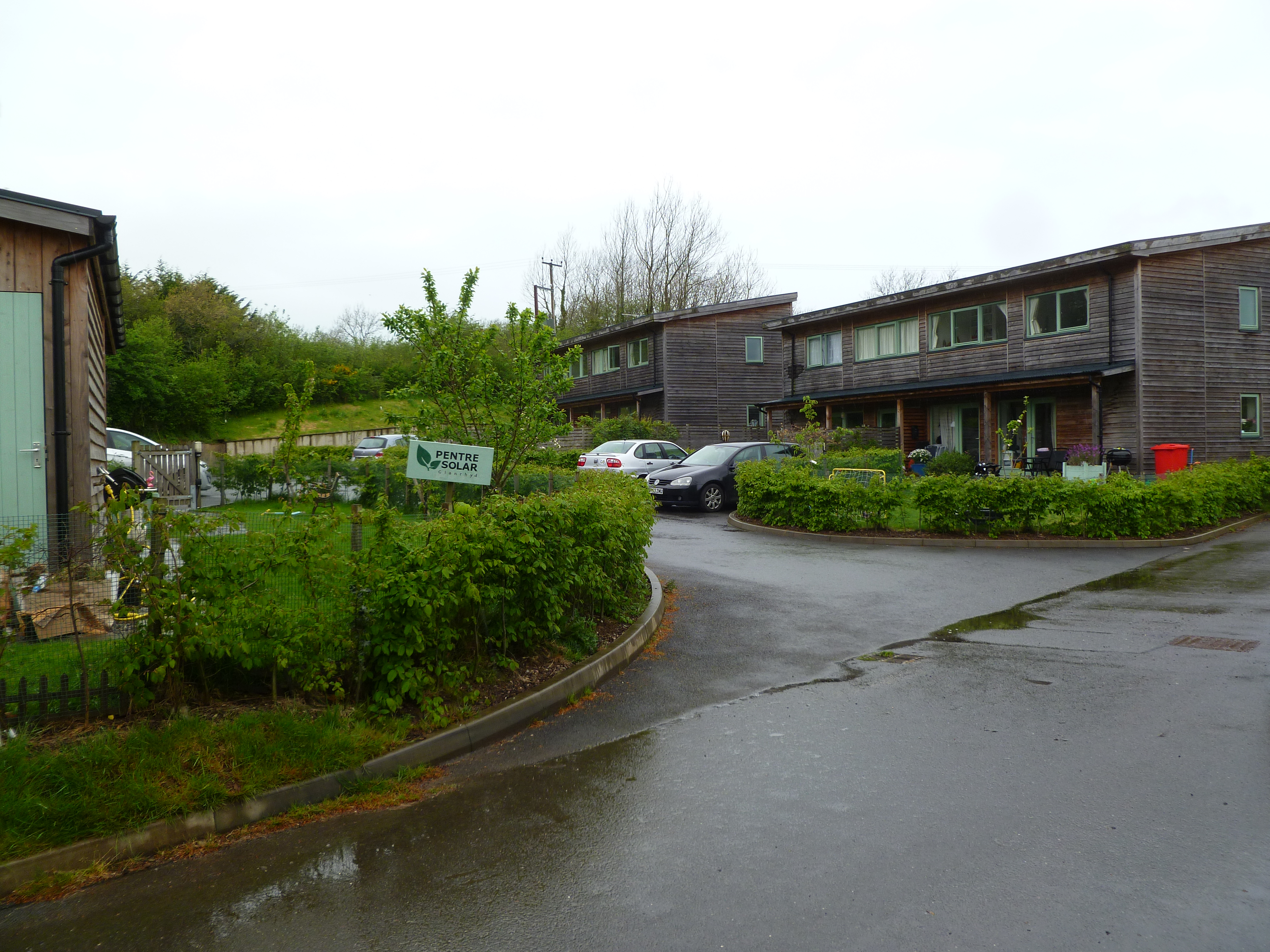
Pentre Solar, Glanrhyd

=== Tredefaid ===
A Grade II listed farmhouse, dating back to the 17th century or earlier. It was originally the home of the Lewes family, and later the Bowen family.

=== Penralltddu ===
A Victorian farmhouse built for J. W. Bowen in 1861 on the site of an earlier house dating back at least to 1773.

=== Pentre Solar, Glanrhyd ===
A development of six sustainable homes at Glanrhyd was approved by the Pembrokeshire Coast National Park's planning committee in June 2014, with conditions that the buildings would be manufactured locally and free solar powered electricity would be provided. The development was completed in 2017, and was the first of the sustainable developments initiated by Dr Glen Peters of Rhosygilwen.

== 2026 National Eisteddfod of Wales ==
The Pembrokeshire National Eisteddfod of Wales, known as Eisteddfod Y Garreg Las, is taking place at Llantood in August 2026.
