= Gulou =

A Gulou (鼓楼) is a drum tower traditionally located in the center of Chinese cities. It may also refer to:

== Individual drum towers ==
- Beijing Gulou and Zhonglou, the drum tower and bell tower of Beijing
- Drum Tower of Xi'an
- Drum Tower of Nanjing
- Bianjing Drum Tower

== Administrative divisions in China ==
=== Districts ===
- Gulou District, Fuzhou, Fujian
- Gulou District, Kaifeng, Henan
- Gulou District, Nanjing, Jiangsu
- Gulou District, Xuzhou, Jiangsu

=== Subdistricts ===
- Gulou Subdistrict, Beijing
- Gulou Subdistrict, Ezhou, in Echeng District, Ezhou, Hubei
- Gulou Subdistrict, Macheng, in Macheng, Huanggang, Hubei

=== Townships ===
- Gulou, Anhua, Hunan Province
- Gulou, Dongkou (古楼乡), Dongkou County, Hunan

== See also ==
- Gulou station (disambiguation)
- Drum Tower (disambiguation)
- Gu (disambiguation)
- Lou (disambiguation)
- Gulu (disambiguation)
- Gulo (disambiguation)
- Gulov
- Gułów (disambiguation)
