= Rhosygilwen =

Cultural and renewable energy centre in Pembrokeshire, Wales

- Rhosygilwen
- Location within Wales

General information
- Location: Rhoshill, Pembrokeshire, Cilgerran, Wales
- Renovated: 1830
- Owner: Dr Glen Peters

Technical details
- Grounds: 50 acres

Design and construction
- Known for: Cultural events, solar power

Rhosygilwen is an estate and former mansion in Rhoshill, Pembrokeshire in the community and parish of Cilgerran, South-west Wales. It is a centre for culture, retreat, celebration, eco-housing planning and renewable energy. The owner and CEO is Dr Glen Peters MBE.

== History ==
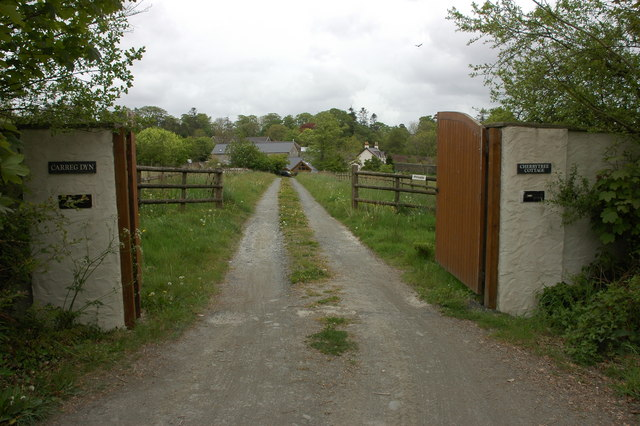
Entrance to Carreg Dyn, Rhosygilwen

Rhosygilwen was owned by the Jones family until 1697, when it passed to the Colby family who owned it until the 20th century; Thomas Frederick Colby was raised there. His father Thomas Colby was High Sheriff of Pembrokeshire in 1771. The house was rebuilt in the 1830s, and again towards the end of the century. In 1985, the upper floors suffered a fire, but the original oak central staircase remains.

The present owner, engineer and novelist Dr Glen Peters, acquired the property in 1994 after the house had suffered a serious fire and was about to be demolished. A solar farm, the first of its kind in Wales, was established in 2011.

In 2024, in order to stabilise the electricity needed to run the estate, a turbine planning application was backed by the planning committee. The erection was completed in 2025.

== Cultural venue ==
The estate of Rhosygilwen, covering 50 acres (20 ha), is a cultural venue, retreat and events centre. The main house, coach house and gated entrance are listed buildings. Neuadd y Dderwen (The Oak Hall) is a carbon neutral 250-seat building that has attracted such performers as Catrin Finch, Shân Cothi and Maddy Prior. In June 2023, BBC Radio's Any questions? was broadcast from Rhosygilwen.

=== Menter Rhosygilwen ===
Menter Rhosygilwen is a limited company whose purpose is "Support activities to performing arts", and has four directors, including Glen Peters. A music bursary was launched in 2024, which was increased in 2025 owing to the high standards.

=== Pembrokeshire Book Festival ===
Rhosygilwen hosts the annual Penfro Book Festival.

== Renewable energy ==
This aspect of Rhosygilwen is supported by Western Solar whose director, Dr Glen Peters, is the owner of Rhosygilwen estate. In 2011 the first solar energy farm in Wales was installed at Rhosygilwen, with 10,000 panels in a field of 6 acres (2.4 ha). Dr Peters was appointed MBE in the 2025 King's Birthday Honours "For services to Green Energy and Eco Housing". To support the estate in the winter months, a 600kW wind turbine was planned in 2023 and installed in 2025.

=== Western Solar ===
The company, whose headquarters are at Rhosygilwen, describe the nature of their business as the production of electricity and construction of domestic buildings.

==== Pentre Solar, Glanrhyd ====
A development of six sustainable homes at Glanrhyd was approved by the Pembrokeshire Coast National Park's planning committee in June 2014, with conditions that the buildings would be manufactured locally and free solar powered electricity would be provided. The development was completed in 2017.

==== Berllan Aur, Boncath ====
Work began on sustainable homes in Boncath in 2019 using locally-sourced materials wherever possible. They were ready to be handed over to residents in 2021.
