= Cilgerran =

Village, parish and community in Pembrokeshire, Wales

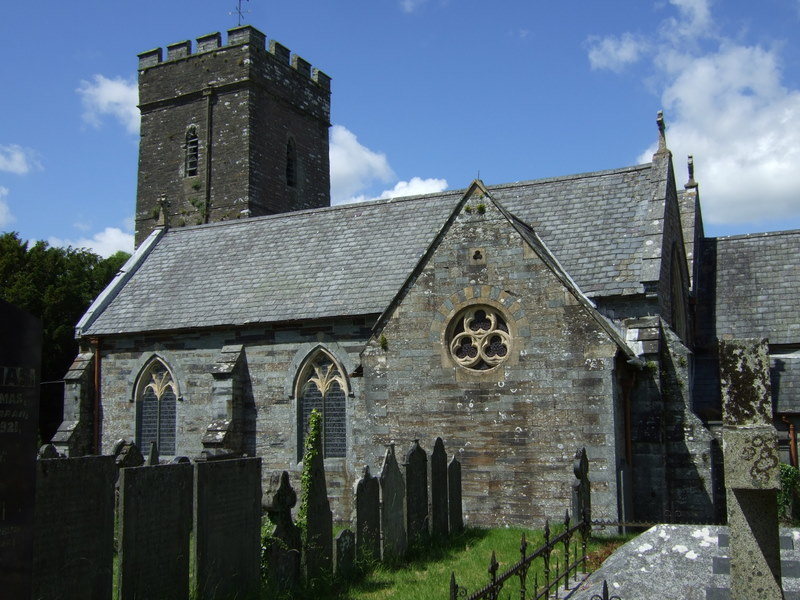
- Parish Church of St Llawddog

- Location within Pembrokeshire
- Population: 1,507 (2011)
- OS grid reference: SN195427
- Community: Cilgerran
- Principal area: Pembrokeshire
- Preserved county: Dyfed
- Country: Wales
- Sovereign state: United Kingdom
- Post town: CARDIGAN
- Postcode district: SA43
- Dialling code: 01239
- Police: Dyfed-Powys
- Fire: Mid and West Wales
- Ambulance: Welsh
- UK Parliament: Preseli Pembrokeshire
- Senedd Cymru – Welsh Parliament: Preseli Pembrokeshire
- List of places UK Wales Pembrokeshire 52.05322°N 4.63396°W Map of the community

Cilgerran (previously Kilgerran or Cil-Garon) is both a village, a parish, and also a community, situated on the south bank of the River Teifi in Pembrokeshire, Wales. It was formerly an incorporated market town.

Among Cilgerran's attractions are Cilgerran Castle and annual coracle races. Kilgerran Halt was a stop on the former Whitland and Cardigan Railway. There are 49 listed buildings in the community, including the parish church.

Nearby are the hamlets of Llwyncelyn, Rhoshill, Cnwce, Pen-y-bryn, Carreg-wen and Pontrhydyceirt, and the villages of Llechryd and Boncath.

Cilgerran Hundred derives its title from the former town, which was once the headquarters of the commote of Emlyn is Cuch (Emlyn below the River Cych).

Slate quarrying was an important activity in the 19th century.

== Location ==
Cilgerran lies 50 metres (160 ft) above sea level on the southern bank of the River Teifi. The stream Afon Plysgog which rises on nearby Rhoshill runs under the road to the west of Cilgerran to join the Teifi. A mixture of woodland and pasture surrounds the town, which is strung out along a fairly level C-class road in an east–west orientation connecting with the A484 at Llechryd to the east and the A478 at Pen-y-bryn to the west.

== History ==
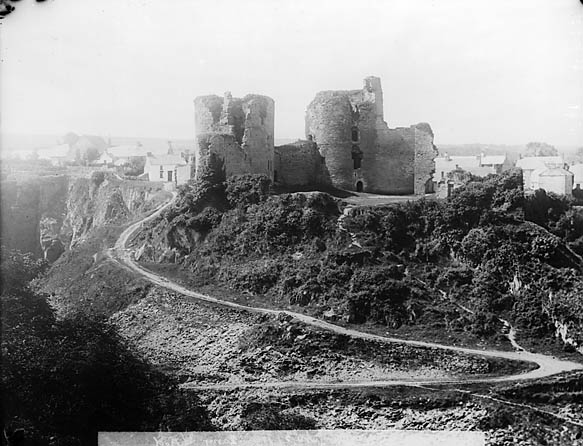
Cilgerran Castle c. 1885

Cilgerran Castle, strategically built in 1100 at "Cenarth Bychan", high above the River Teifi, is the castle from which Owain of Powys is said to have abducted Nest in 1109. Originally in Cantref Emlyn (Emlyn Is-Cych), Cilgerran came under Norman control with the building of the castle, from where the Lordship of Cilgerran was administered. The Welsh under the Lord Rhys regained control from 1164-65 (the date of the first recording of the name "Cilgerran") to 1223. By 1204 the town was beginning to grow, with 22 taxpayers recorded in 1292.

The Hundred of Cilgerran was established in 1536. It was a marcher borough; Owen, Lord of Kemes, described it in 1603 as one of five Pembrokeshire boroughs overseen by a portreeve. Cilgerran (as Kilgarren) appears on a 1578 parish map of Pembrokeshire. Although the town remained small it was considered one of the main market centres in Pembrokeshire in the early 17th century, with mainly Welsh demographics.

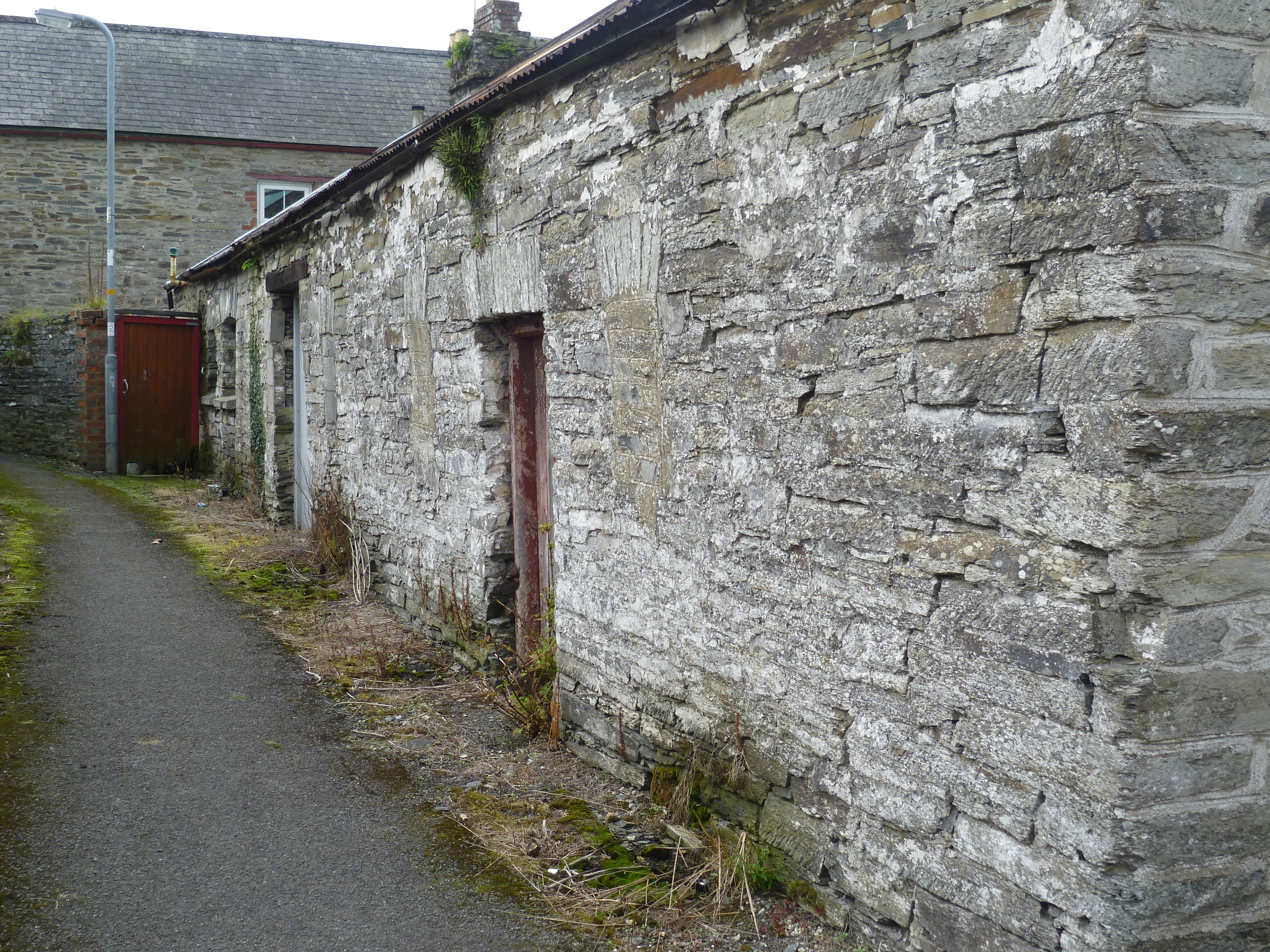
Former dwelling (note blocked-up windows) built from local stone

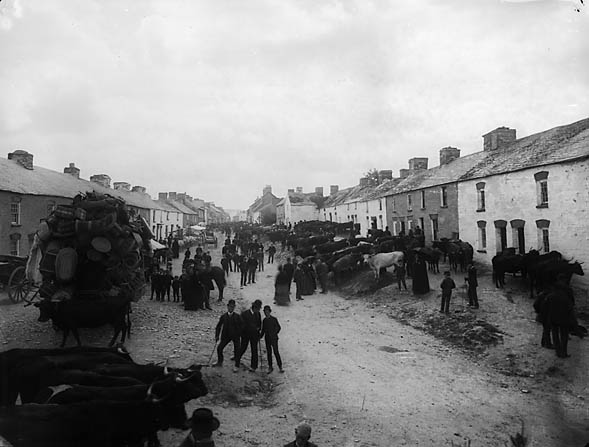
Cilgerran fair c. 1885

The principal occupations throughout Cilgerran's history were farming, salmon fishing and slate quarrying. In 1895 salmon of 38 and 43 1/2lb were caught in coracle nets. The town's market ended in the early 20th century, there was no further quarrying after 1936 and the castle had been allowed to become a ruin since the 16th century, partly as a result of nearby quarrying. At least since 1833 Cilgerran has been referred to as a village.

A rare visit by a white stork to the village was photographed in April 2016.

== Worship ==
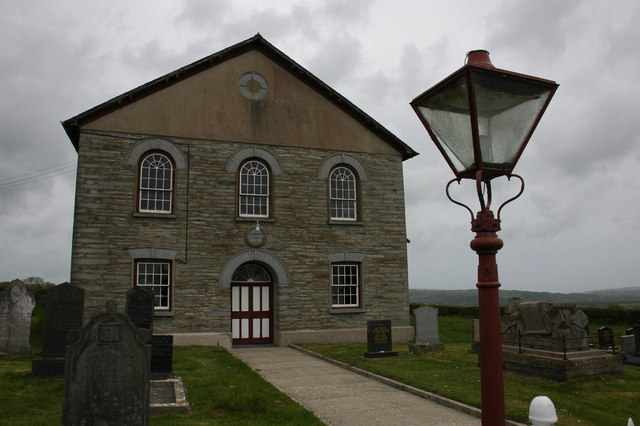
Tyrhos Chapel

The parish church of St Llawddog is a grade II* listed building. The church's tower is mediaeval and the remainder, in decorated Gothic style, dates from 1855. The font and pulpit are carved Bath stone. The churchyard contains a megalithic standing stone or Ogham stone upon which Ogham writing can still be seen.

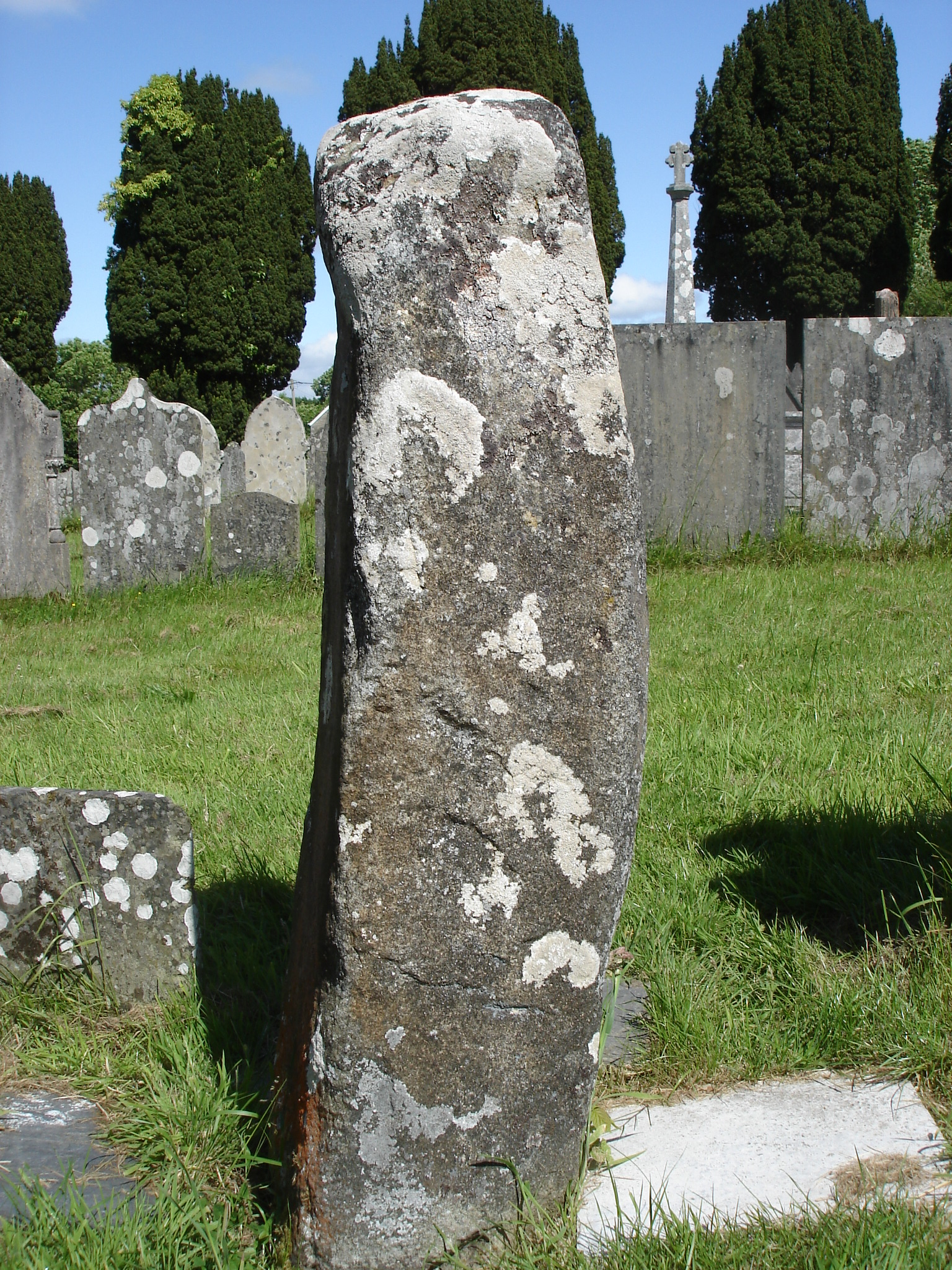
Ogham Stone, St Llawddog's churchyard

Penuel Baptist Chapel (a Grade II listed building) is on the main street, while Tyrhos Congregational Chapel (Grade II) is on the road linking Cilgerran and the hamlet of Rhoshill. Babell Calvinist Methodist Chapel dates from about 1763 and closed in 2011.

== Education ==
Cilgerran County Primary School educates 139 (in 2013) children from nursery to 11 years old and serves several surrounding villages. Pupils are taught in English and Welsh with the aim of bilingualism by the age of 11.

== Public houses ==
The Cardiff Arms (19th century) and Pendre Inn (18th century or earlier) are both Grade II listed buildings; the Masons Arms (known locally as the Ramp Inn) is in Cnwce, a settlement to the east of Cilgerran.

== Amenities ==
Cilgerran has a post office, a cafe, a garage/petrol station and general stores. In and around the village are a number of small businesses including a pet food store. Rhosygilwen estate, near Rhoshill, has three listed buildings and is a venue for concerts and exhibitions, attracting international artists and musicians under the banner of Project Rhosygilwen, run by Dr Glen Peters. The estate is home to the first utility-scale solar park in west Wales, constructed in 2011 and generating enough electricity to power 300 homes.

== Transport ==
The Whitland and Cardigan Railway closed in 1962; the section of old trackbed between Cardigan and Cilgerran is now a footpath and cycle track to the Teifi estuary woodlands and marshes and the Welsh Wildlife Centre. The only public transport serving Cilgerran is the local bus service.

Preceding station	Historical railways	Following station
Boncath	Great Western Railway; Whitland & Cardigan Railway	Cardigan

== Attractions ==
With much of Cilgerran Castle in ruins, its picturesque nature and setting have attracted many artists including J. M. W. Turner.

The annual coracle races on the River Teifi were first held in 1950 and attract competitors from all over the world. The river flows slowly through a wooded gorge below the castle making it attractive for canoeists and kayakers.

== Population and governance ==
The census population of the parish of Cilgerran was: 854 (1801): 1266 (1851): 1,033 (1901): 815 (1951): 703 (1981). The percentage of Welsh speakers was: 96 (1891): 94 (1931): 78 (1971). The population in 2001 was 1,931, with 53 per cent Welsh speakers, and in 2011 was 1,507. The village has its own elected community council; the community includes Bridell, Llantood and Rhoshill. The electoral ward of Cilgerran covers the communities of Cilgerran and Manordeifi. The ward had a population of 1,453 in 2001, increasing to 2,058 in the 2011 Census.

== Slate quarrying ==
A substantial degree of slate quarrying was carried out in and near Cilgerran, mostly situated on the south side of the River Teifi's gorge. They played a significant role in Wales' slate industry, being the only significant quarries in South Wales apart from those around Rhoshill.

Most slate was transported to the port at Cardigan for export by sea. Some of the slate was used for buildings within the town, or exported directly by railway for use within Britain. Wharves were built east of the town on the River Teifi (at 52°03′25.7″N 4°36′54.7″W), where slate could be loaded onto boats to take it to Cardigan.

Slate was first quarried at Cilgerran by John Edwards, in the late 1790s. He opened a quarry north of the town, in the land known as 'Forest' (near the Caernarfon Farm), called the Lower quarry or Forest quarry – at the site of what became Quarry Caernarvon. Later, with his two sons John and Thomas, Edwards opened another quarry slightly higher up the river, known as the Gigfran quarry ('Gigfran' is Welsh for 'Carrion crow'). Soon afterwards, John Bowen opened the Plain quarries, and around this time the Castle quarries and Moses' quarry were also opened, by George John and David John, and Moses Griffith, respectively. Upon the death of John Edwards (around 1830), Thomas Lloyd, of Coedmawr, and Oliver Lloyd, of Cardigan, acquired the Lower quarries, and began expanding them on a large scale. However, they sold the quarries soon afterwards, to James Stephens, of Llechryd.

In the late 1830s, another quarry was opened in the 'Forest' estate, by Mr. James Mathias of Cilgerran. It was called 'Quarry Forever', and situated adjacent to Gigfran quarry. About the same time, Gigfran quarry became exhausted and was thus given up. The industry peaked in the late 19th century, its continuance until that time supported by the coming of the railway in 1869.

There were two groups of quarries at Cilgerran – the ones north of the town, known collectively as the Forest quarries, and those to the east of the town, around Cnwcau, sometimes called the Town quarries. The Forest quarries were almost immediately opposite (the other side of the Teifi Gorge from) Rhoshill.

The major quarries were:

Name	Coordinates	OS grid reference	Source
Forest quarries, Fforest quarries, or Lower quarries			
Quarry Caernarfon	52°04′28.7″N 4°38′34.6″W	SN 18895 45150	
Quarry Tommy	52°04′19.4″N 4°38′28.2″W	SN 19006 44858	
Quarry Ffynnon	52°04′23.6″N 4°38′29.5″W	SN 18986 44989	
Quarry Bach	52°04′17.3″N 4°38′22.7″W	SN 19109 44790	
Gigfran quarry	52°04′10.1″N 4°38′17.8″W	SN 19194 44564	
Quarry Forever	52°04′07.5″N 4°38′17.0″W	SN 19206 44483	
Town quarries or Upper quarries			
Cefn quarry	52°03′21.2″N 4°37′05.2″W	SN 20521 43004	
Plain quarry	52°03′17.8″N 4°37′15.8″W	SN 20315 42906	
Pwdwr quarry	52°03′17.5″N 4°37′40.4″W	SN 19847 42914	
Dolbadau quarry	52°3′18.5″N 4°37′44.8″W	SN 19764 42947	
Cilgerran Castle quarries	52°3′24.2″N 4°37′58.7″W	SN 19506 43133	

== Notable people ==
- Siôn Cent (ca.1367/1400 – ca.1430) a Welsh language poet and an important figure in Medieval Welsh literature, born at Cwm Tridwr near Egllwisilan or Kilgerran.
- Admiral Sir Erasmus Gower (1742–1814), a Welsh naval officer and colonial governor. A memorial was erected in Cilgerran St Llawddog's Church by his brother, Abel Anthony Gower.
- Titus Lewis (1773–1811), a Welsh Baptist minister and author, was born in Cilgerran.
- Thomas Frederick Colby (1784–1852), geographer was brought up at Rhosygilwen mansion between Cilgerran and Rhoshill.
- William Edmond Logan (1798 in Mount Logan, Canada – 1875 buried in Cilgerran), the first director of Geological Survey of Canada who mapped the coal mines of South Wales.
- John Rowland Phillips (1844–1887), lawyer and antiquary.
- Rhys Lloyd, Baron Lloyd of Kilgerran CBE, QC, JP (1907–1991), a Welsh Liberal Party politician.
- Bernard Thomas (ca.1923–2014), of Llechryd, piloted a Welsh coracle across the English Channel in 1974 in 13 1/2 hours, to demonstrate how the Bull Boats of the Mandan Indians of North Dakota could have been copied from coracles introduced by Prince Madog in the 12th century.
