= Gulou station =

Gulou station may refer to one of several metro stations in China:

- Gulou station (Ningbo Rail Transit), Ningbo
- Gulou station (Nanjing Metro), Nanjing
- Gulou station (Tianjin Metro), Tianjin
- Gulou Dajie station, Beijing

== See also ==
- Gulou (disambiguation)
- Gulu railway station
