= Gulu Khalilov =

- Qulu Qasım oğlu Xəlilov
- Born: 20 November 1930; Village of Gyzyljig, Sisian District (Zangezur district, Armenian SSR, USSR)
- Died: 16 November 1995 (aged 64); Baku, Azerbaijan
- Resting place: Baku, Shagan Settlement
- Education: Baku State University
- Occupations: Writer, critic, journalist, literary scholar, scientist, teacher

Gulu Gassim oglu Khalilov (Khalilli) (20 November 1930, Armenian SSR, village of Gyzyljig, Sisian district (Zangezur district) – 16 November 1995, Baku) was a scientist, prose writer, critic, literary scholar, journalist, a member of the Union of Soviet Writers (since 1953), a member of the Union of Journalists of the USSR (since 1953), Doctor of Philological Sciences (1967), professor at Baku State University (1968–1995), and an Honored Scientist (1993).

== Biography ==
Gulu Khalilov was born on 20 November 1930, in the village of Gyzyljig, Zangezur (Sisian) district, in a peasant family. There were nine children in the family: five brothers and four sisters. As the eldest of the brothers, Gulu, along with his parents, bore the responsibility of supporting the family. In 1948, his family was forcibly relocated to the village of Poladly in the Agjabedi district.

Khalilov graduated with honors from the Faculty of Philology at the Azerbaijan State University, specializing in journalism (1949-1954). From a young age, he was actively involved in public life. As a student, he was the chairman of the Student Scientific Society, a member of the Komsomol bureau, and the editor of the wall newspaper. He worked as the head of the Criticism Department at the editorial office of the newspaper "Literature and Art" (Azerb. "Ədəbiyyat və incəsənət") (1954-1955). He studied in the postgraduate program at the Azerbaijan Pedagogical University (1956-1959), defending his candidate dissertation on the topic "The Play 'Vagif' and the Genre of Historical Drama" six months ahead of schedule (1959). In 1968, Khalilov defended his doctoral dissertation on the topic "The History of the Development of the Azerbaijani Novel" and earned his Doctor of Philological Sciences degree. From 1967 to 1970, he worked as a senior researcher at the Nizami Institute of Literature of the National Academy of Sciences of Azerbaijan, and as a teacher and later professor (1967) at the Department of History of Azerbaijani Press, Faculty of Journalism, Azerbaijan State University. From 1977 to 1978, he served as the Dean of the Faculty of Philology. From 1968 until his death in 1995, he was a professor at the Department of "History of the Press and Methods of Ideological Work" at the Faculty of Journalism.

Gulu Khalilov dedicated his life to defending the interests of the people, expressing his stance in the fight for Azerbaijan's independence. He is remembered as a courageous, patriotic, and honest person.

Throughout many years, Khalilov suffered from serious health problems, undergoing nine major surgeries. He died in Baku on 20 November 1995. Although it was proposed to bury Khalilov in the II Alley of Honorary Burials in Baku, considering his wishes and those of his family, he was buried next to his father at the cemetery in the Shagan settlement of the Khazar district.

=== Family ===
In 1957, Gulu Khalilov married Gozyal Saleh gizi Khalilova (1936-2022). They had two daughters (Almaz and Rena) and a son (Azer).

His brother, Ingilab Gassim oglu Khalilov (1942), is a candidate of pedagogical sciences and an associate professor at the Azerbaijan University of Languages. Another brother, Nizami Gassim oglu Khalilov (1949-2021), was a doctor of philological sciences and a professor at Baku State University.

His granddaughter, Aysel Azer gizi Suleymanli, is a Doctor of Philosophy in Medicine and a lecturer at Azerbaijan Medical University. Another granddaughter, Sima Azer gizi Suleymanli, is a Doctor of Philosophy in Law and a PhD candidate at ADU.

== Creative work ==
The main theme of Gulu Khalilov's work was always the human factor and the interests of the people. He began his creative journey on 8 January 1953, with the article "On the Mountain of Gylynj," published in the newspaper "Literature and Art" (Azerb. "Ədəbiyyat və incəsənət"). After that, Khalilov regularly published journalistic and critical articles and stories in the press, and hosted radio and television programs. His biographical novel "I Want to Live" (Azerb. "Yaşamaq istəyirəm") became one of the most popular works of the time, and it was repeatedly reissued. Khalilov is the author of works such as "My Father and I" ("Atam və mən"), "The Spring of Life" ("Ömrün baharı"), "The Conversation of the Elders" ("Qocaların söhbəti"), "The Teacher" ("Müəllimə"), and others.

Gulu Khalilov was one of the custodians of Azerbaijani literature. People's writer Suleyman Raghimov called Khalilov the "mace of Koroğlu" of Azerbaijani criticism, and the people's poet Bakhtiyar Vahabzade called him the "sword of Babek." Khalilov was also successful in the field of science, writing many fundamental scientific works. His research, "The History of the Development of the Azerbaijani Novel," is still valued as a textbook. He contributed to the preparation of many candidates and doctors of science. Gulu Khalilov is the author of 15 scientific-critical works, 10 literary works, and more than a thousand scientific-journalistic articles.

=== Literary-critical activity ===
Gulu Khalilov's literary-critical activity holds significant importance in the context of analyzing the ideological and content structure of the Azerbaijani Soviet novel, the dynamics of its thematic development, the formation of plot and character systems, as well as the linguistic and stylistic features. In his critiques, he systematically analyzed the connection between literary characters and social realities, along with their artistic and aesthetic value.

His research particularly focuses on the structural analysis of Suleyman Rahimov's novels Shamo, Sachli, and Mehman. Specifically, Q. Khalilov objectively examined the interaction between ideological components and artistic construction in these works. Mirza Ibrahimov's novel Boyuk Dayaq was also subjected to a comprehensive analysis for the first time by him, where he assessed not only its ideological aspects but also its compositional and structural features.

Gulu Khalilov's article The Cart Climbing to the Summit, dedicated to the works of Sabir Ahmadli, is regarded as one of the critical texts exploring the development directions of Azerbaijani prose. His literary portraits, such as A Distinguished Realist Artist (about M. P. Vagif), A Few Words About Mayakovsky, An Artist with the Grandeur of Mountains (about S. Rahimov), and A Life of Honor (about S. Rustam), stand out in Azerbaijani literary studies with their distinct methodological approaches. His monograph Rasul Rza, published in 1960, is considered one of the fundamental research works reflecting Gulu Khalilov's literary-critical methodology. His analysis of the creative work of People's Poet Rasul Rza highlights the originality and innovation of his poetic style. The author states:

"Rasul Rza is not a poet who follows a beaten, stereotypical path. Above all, he is a poet devoted to the progressive traditions of classical Azerbaijani poetry, as well as Russian and world poetry. He constantly seeks and discovers new means of expression, presenting unique, original features."

This perspective demonstrates that his creative work is evaluated in the context of both classical and modern poetry. At the same time, the critic also draws attention to some shortcomings in the poet's style, stating:

"New ideas, new content, and new means of expression take center stage in his poetry."

However, he also notes that these poetic experiments sometimes create structural inconsistencies, adding:

"This poem contains several flaws, as the form does not match the content. There is no unity. The content is extremely lyrical and profound, whereas the form is pale, cold, and dry..."

This critical approach indicates that Gulu Khalilov evaluated Rasul Rza's work not only in terms of its strengths but also by identifying certain inconsistencies in its poetic structure.

In his monograph The Play Vaqif and the Genre of Historical Drama, he analyzed the artistic and ideological characteristics of Samad Vurgun's play Vaqif, scientifically determining that it was written in the genre of heroism.

Gulu Khalilov's critical activity is comprehensively reflected in the book Criticism is a Difficult Profession (1986). This work explores the attitude toward literary criticism during the Soviet period, its structural problems, and the role of the critic in literature. As an objective and principled critic, he emphasized the function of criticism in the development of literature. Additionally, Gulu Khalilov examined the works of a new generation of Azerbaijani writers, offering the first critical assessments of the literary activities of Sabir Rustamkhanli, Eldar Bakhish, Seyran Sahavat, and Zelimkhan Yaqub.

Gulu Khalilov took a harsh critical stance against detective literature, arguing that this genre had not reached the necessary level in Azerbaijani literature. He emphasized that the primary function of detective fiction should not only be to engage the reader but also to carry significant literary and social values. He pointed out that in some writers' works, the excessive idealization of protagonists diminished their connection to real life. He argued that such characters lacked credibility in the eyes of the reader.

=== Works ===
Scientific-Journalistic Works:

- Rasul Rza (1960).
- For Great Art (1962).
- The Play "Vagif" and the Genre of Historical Drama (1964).
- Art and Master (1966).
- V. I. Lenin and the Issues of Literature (1970).
- The Victory of Lenin's National Policy in Azerbaijani Soviet Literature (1971).
- The History of the Development of the Azerbaijani Novel (1973).
- Life – The Source of Creativity (1974).
- Life and Knowledge (1980).
- Sounds Coming from Life (1984).
- Lenin's Teachings in Art and Modernity (1984).
- The Smell of the Earth (1984).
- Criticism – A Hard Profession (1986).
- Tears of the Earth (1989).
- You Can Renounce Everything, But Not the Homeland (1995).

Literary Works

- Aunt Malak (1969).
- I Want to Live (Published in 1968, 1981, 1993, 2005).
- My Father and I (1975).
- The Spring of Life (1978, 1987).
- I Want to Live (in Russian, 1977).
- Yaşashni istayman (in Uzbek, 1978).

Books Written About Gulu Khalilov

- The Man Who Cares for the Land (Gulu Khalilov in Memories) (2000).
- N. Aliyeva. Pages of an Unsettled Life (1998).
- A. Sadikova. The Cry of a Citizen (2000).

== Awards ==
- Medal "For Valiant Labor in the Great Patriotic War of 1941-1945" (6 June 1945)
- Medal "In Commemoration of the 100th Anniversary of the Birth of Vladimir Ilyich Lenin" (1970)
- Jubilee Medal "Thirty Years of Victory in the Great Patriotic War of 1941-1945" (25 June 1975) Honorary Diploma of the Presidium of the Supreme Soviet of the Azerbaijan SSR (16 January 1981)
- Honorary Diploma of the Presidium of the Supreme Soviet of the Azerbaijan SSR "For Excellence in Labor" (22 August 1986)
- Honored Scientist of the Azerbaijan Republic (10 October 1993)
