= Rhoshill, Pembrokeshire =

Village in Pembrokeshire, Wales

Coordinates: 52.03°N 4.64°W

Rhoshill
- Location within Pembrokeshire
- OS grid reference: SN190402
- Community: Cilgerran
- Principal area: Pembrokeshire
- Country: Wales
- Sovereign state: United Kingdom
- Postcode district: SA
- Dialling code: 01239
- Police: Dyfed-Powys
- Fire: Mid and West Wales
- Ambulance: Welsh

Rhoshill (also known as Rhos-hill) is a hamlet on the A478 road, in the community and parish of Cilgerran, in Pembrokeshire, South-west Wales. The hamlet is situated at the crossroads between the A478 road and the unclassified road from Cilgerran to Eglwyswrw, and includes the Rhosygilwen estate.

== Description ==
Rhoshill is a collection of about twenty houses at an elevation of 150 metres (490 ft), surrounded by farmland, and the local name given to the hill which runs westwards from the hamlet. On some maps the hill to the south of Rhoshill is marked as Windy Hill. An area of the hill is marked as Mynydd Crogwy, but the significance of this is not clear as there is no direct translation (although crogwyr means hangman).

Rhoshill is in the parish of Cilgerran and is administered by Cilgerran Community Council. It is home to an agricultural engineering company and a number of other business including a herb grower (medicinal and culinary) and holiday lets.

== History ==
The north–south road (now the A478) running through Rhoshill formed part of a drovers' road moving local and Irish livestock as far away as England, a practice driven by demand for centuries. Even after the coming of the railways, stock would still have been moved from farms to Cilgerran or Crymych railway stations by road.

A pre-1850 parish map shows an inn at Rhos-hill, while later 19th century Ordnance Survey maps show that Rhoshill had two pubs, the Foundry Arms and the Bronwydd Arms, and a post office, all of which have since closed and become private dwellings. The Bronwydd Arms was subject to a receivership order in 1891.

== Chapel ==
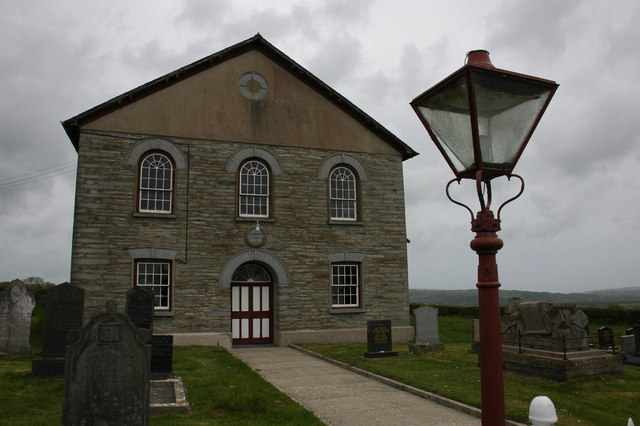
Ty Rhos Chapel

Ty Rhos Chapel is 0.5 miles (0.80 km) to the northeast of Rhoshill. It was built in 1815, rebuilt in 1859 and is a Grade II listed building.

== Rhosygilwen ==
The estate of Rhosygilwen, covering 50 acres (20 ha), is a cultural venue, retreat and events centre. The main house, coach house and gated entrance are listed buildings. Neuadd y Dderwen (The Oak Hall) is a carbon neutral 250-seat building that has attracted such performers as Catrin Finch and Shân Cothi and is supported by Western Solar whose CEO, Dr Glen Peters, is the owner of Rhosygilwen. In 2011 the first solar energy farm in Wales was installed at Rhosygilwen, with 10,000 panels in a field of 6 acres (2.4 ha). The estate hosts the annual Penfro Book Festival. Dr Peters was appointed MBE in the 2025 King's Birthday Honours "For services to Green Energy and Eco Housing".

Rhosygilwen was owned by the Jones family until 1697, when it passed to the Colby family who owned it until the 20th century; Thomas Frederick Colby was raised there. His father Thomas Colby was High Sheriff of Pembrokeshire in 1771. The house was rebuilt in the 1830s, and again towards the end of the century. In 1985, the upper floors suffered a fire, but the original oak central staircase remains.

== Notable people ==
Stephen Varney, international under-20 rugby union player
