= Wumatang railway station =

Railway station in China

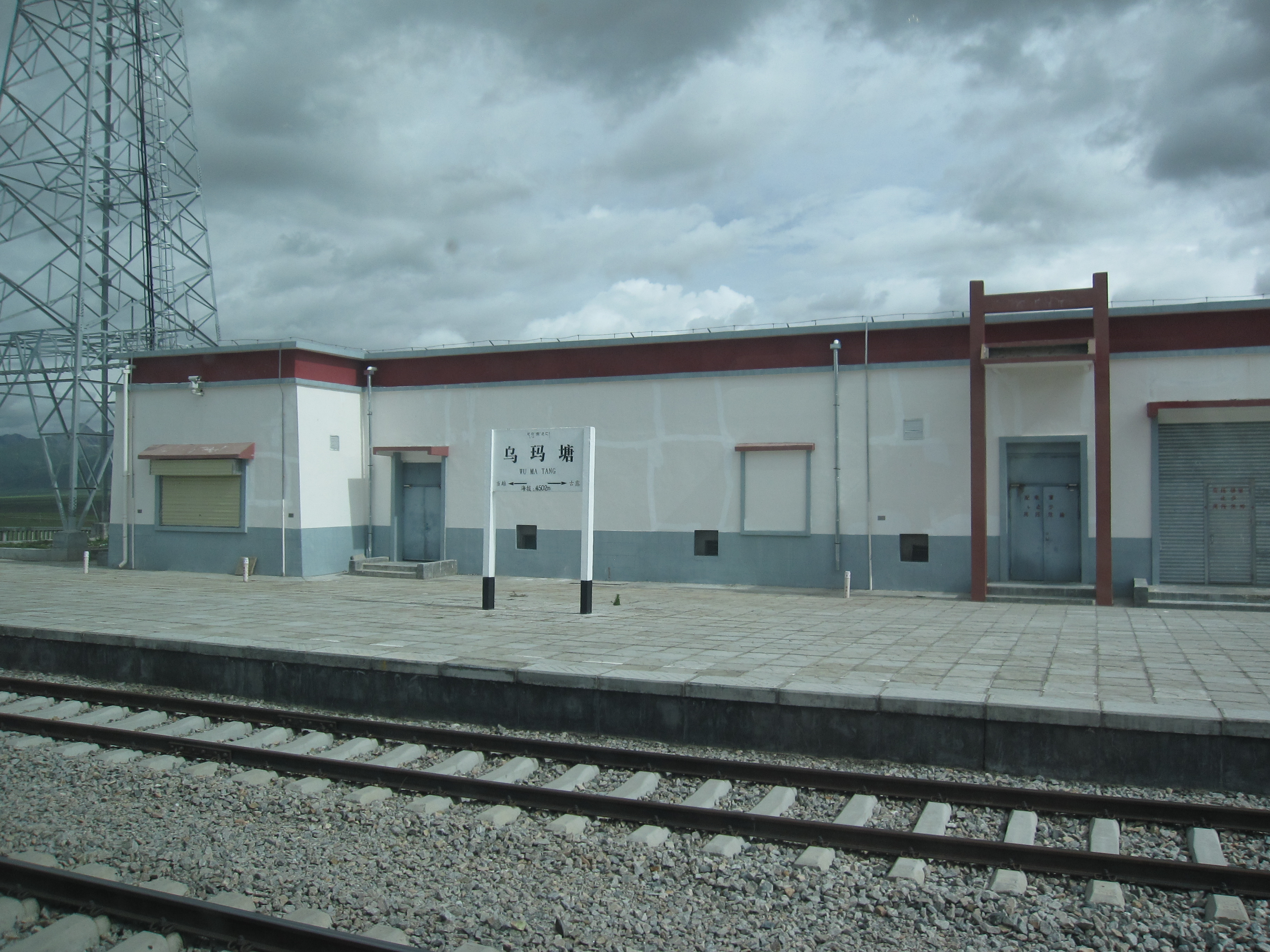
Wumatang railway station

Wumatang railway station (simplified Chinese: 乌玛塘站; traditional Chinese: 烏瑪塘站) is a station on the Chinese Qinghai–Tibet railway.

== See also ==
- List of stations on Qinghai–Tibet railway

Preceding station	China Railway	Following station
Gulu towards Xining	Qinghai–Tibet railway	Dangxiong towards Lhasa
