= Bridell =

Village and parish in Pembrokeshire, Wales

Coordinates: 52.047°N 4.660°W

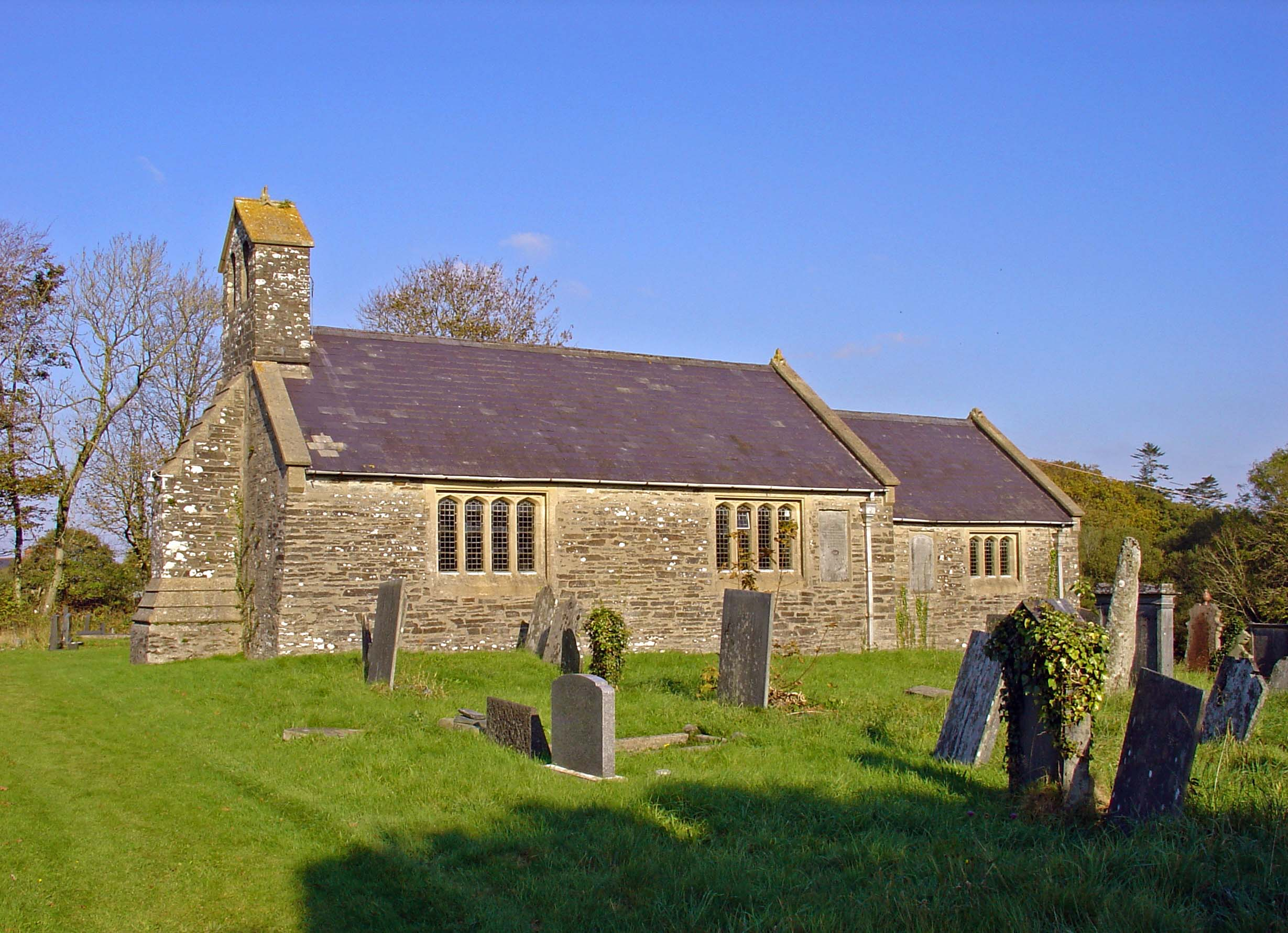
- Parish church of St David

- Location within Pembrokeshire
- OS grid reference: SN175410
- Community: Cilgerran
- Principal area: Pembrokeshire
- Country: Wales
- Sovereign state: United Kingdom
- Post town: Cardigan
- Postcode district: SA43
- Dialling code: 01239
- Police: Dyfed-Powys
- Fire: Mid and West Wales
- Ambulance: Welsh
- UK Parliament: Preseli Pembrokeshire
- Senedd Cymru – Welsh Parliament: Preseli Pembrokeshire

Bridell (Welsh: Y Bridell) is a small settlement and parish in north Pembrokeshire, Wales. The parish includes the village of Pen-y-bryn. Together with the parishes of Cilgerran and Llantood, it is in the community of Cilgerran.

== Bridell Parish ==
The Church in Wales parish of Bridell is on the A478, 2.5 miles (4.0 km) south of Cardigan and consists of a few private houses, the church (St David's) and Plas Bridell Manor house, a 19th-century mansion which, until 2019, was a nursing home.

The derivation of the parish name is obscure. Lying on the western border of the cantref of Emlyn, it has always been essentially Welsh-speaking. Bridell (as Brydelthe) appears on a 1578 parish map of Pembrokeshire.

In the churchyard of St David's is a 9 feet (2.7 m) high stone cross whose inscription appears unreadable, but has been deciphered as Nettasagri maqi mucoi Briaci, and commemorates a man named Nettasagri, the son of the kin of Briaci. The stone is believed to be 5th century, and was probably "Chritianised" with a cross later. The language is Ogham.

The parish area was estimated at 3,000 acres (1,200 ha) in 1844 with a population of 404. Official census figures were: 248 (1801): 335 (1851): 237 (1901): 220 (1951): 221 (1981) with the proportion of Welsh speakers 94 per cent (1891), 90 per cent (1931) and 51 per cent (1971). In 1890, local clergy were reported to be in "great distress" through the failure to collect tithes amounting to £1,738 over six parishes, with Bridell owed £249; previous attempts at recovery had been "crushed by riotous crowds".

== Pen-y-bryn ==
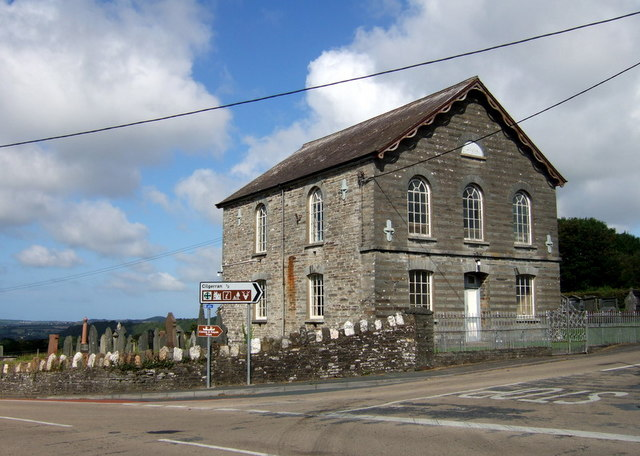
Pen-y-bryn Baptist Chapel

Pen-y-Bryn (English meaning: top of the hill), also referred to as Penybryn, is a small village situated on the northern side of the parish at a crossroads dominated by the Pen-y-Bryn Arms public house on one side and the Grade II-listed Penybryn Baptist Chapel, established in 1818 and rebuilt in 1869, on the other.

Pen-y-bryn has outgrown Bridell owing to a building surge in the latter part of the 20th century driven both by local need and by immigration from other parts of Wales and the UK.

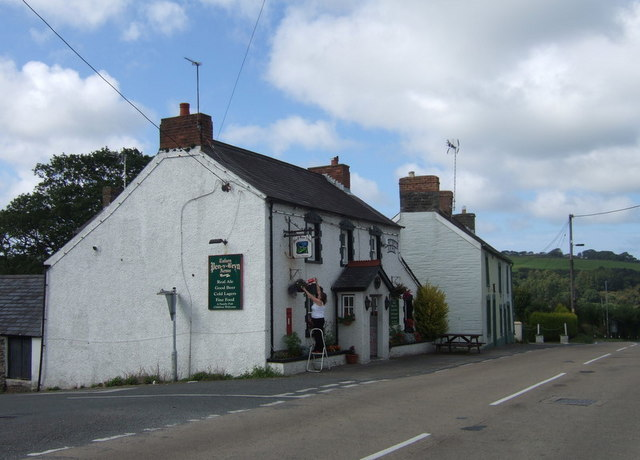
Pen-y-bryn Arms

The Pen-y-bryn Arms has stood at the crossroads at least since the 18th century and enjoys both local and passing trade, standing as it does on the main route into Cardigan from the south. The site formerly included a petrol station and garage, both now closed. There is a Victorian post box embedded in the front wall.
