= Poladlı, Agdam =

Poladlı
- Location within Azerbaijan Location within Karabakh Economic Region
- Coordinates: 39°58′13″N 46°54′39″E
- Country: Azerbaijan
- Rayon: Agdam
- Time zone: UTC+4 (AZT)
  - Summer (DST): UTC+5 (AZT)

Poladlı (also, Poladly and Polatlu) is a village in the Agdam Rayon of Azerbaijan.
