= Aleksei Gulo =

Russian footballer

Personal information
- Full name: Aleksei Valeryevich Gulo
- Date of birth: 15 October 1973 (age 51)
- Place of birth: Minsk, Byelorussian SSR
- Height: 1.90 m (6 ft 3 in)
- Position(s): Defender

Senior career*
Years	Team	Apps	(Gls)
1994	Metallurg Pikalyovo	17	(0)
1997–2000	Kotkan Työväen Palloilijat	112	(6)
2001	Kuusankoski	16	(1)
2002	KooTeePee	23	(2)
2005	Rakuunat	11	(1)
- *Club domestic league appearances and goals

Aleksei Valeryevich Gulo (Russian: Алексей Валерьевич Гуло; born 15 October 1973) is a Russian former professional footballer who played as a defender. He made 61 appearances in the Veikkausliiga for Kotkan Työväen Palloilijat and also played for Metallurg Pikalyovo, Kuusankoski, KooTeePee and Rakuunat.
