= Gulu Ezekiel =

Indian sports journalist

Gul-Fraaz (Gulu) Ezekiel is an Indian sports journalist and a sports memorabilia collector.

== Biography ==
Ezekiel was born to a Bene Israeli Maharashtrian Jewish father, and a Parsi Zoroastrian mother.

Gulu Ezekiel has worked as a sport journalist with various publications such as the Indian Express in Chennai, the Asian Age and the Financial Express in New Delhi and NDTV. He has contributed to more than fifty publications in India and around the world. He also launched GE Features, a features and syndication company, in August 2001.

Gulu is the author of several sports books including The A To Z Of Sachin Tendulkar (2006), Great One-day Internationals (1999), The Story of World Cup Cricket 1999 and The Story of World Cup Cricket 1996. He is also the co-author of Great Indian Olympians.

== Bibliography ==
- Myths and Mysteries: Indian Sport Behind the Headlines (2023)
- Myth-busting: Indian Cricket behind the Headlines (2021)
- Speed Merchants: The Story of Indian Pace Bowling (2020)
- Captain Cool: The M.S. Dhoni Story (2008)
- The A-Z Of Sachin Tendulkar (2005)
- Great Indian Olympians, Co-author (October 2004)
- Who's Who On Indian Stamps (2004), Contributor
- Icons from the World of Sports (September 2003)
- Sourav: A Biography (February 2003)
- Sachin: The Story of the World's Greatest Batsman (September 2002)
- The Best New Cricket Writing - The New Ball IV - Imperial Bedrooms''; Edited by Rob Steen, Contributor (July 2002)
- The New Ball Vol. IV: Imperial Bedrooms, Contributor-(November 2000)
- Great Indian Olympians Co-author (September 2000)
- ABC Cricket 1999-2000 Season Contributor (November 1999)
- The Story of World Cup Cricket 1999 (May 1999)
- Great One-day Internationals (May 1999)
- Penguin Test Match Year 1996-97 Contributor (October 1997)
- The Story of World Cup Cricket, 1996 (March 1996)
- Indian Table Tennis Yearbook, 1992 (November 1992)
- The Best of Expressport, 1986 (Indian Express Publication). Contributor
- The Best of Expressport, 1985 (Indian Express Publication). Contributor
- Indian Cricket 1984 Contributor
