= Poladlı, Qubadli =

Poladlı
- Location within Azerbaijan
- Coordinates: 39°18′36″N 46°34′47″E
- Country: Azerbaijan
- Rayon: Qubadli
- Time zone: UTC+4 (AZT)
  - Summer (DST): UTC+5 (AZT)

Poladlı (also, Poladly and Polatly) is a village in the Qubadli Rayon of Azerbaijan.

Poladlı is an Azeri village in Qubadli.
