= Gulu Asgarov =

Gulu Asgarov Qulu Əsgərov
- Born: 18 December 1928; Salyan, Salyan Uyezd, Azerbaijan SSR, TSFSR, USSR
- Died: 11 June 1987 (aged 58) Baku, Azerbaijan SSR, USSR
- Genres: mugham, folk music, opera
- Occupation: khananda

Gulu Rustam oghlu Asgarov (Azerbaijani: Qulu Rüstəm oğlu Əsgərov, 18 December 1928 — 11 June 1987) was an Azerbaijani mugham and opera singer (lyrical-dramatic tenor), composer, khananda and pedagogue.

== Biography ==
Gulu Asgarov was born on 18 December 1928 in Salyan. At a young age, he performed at the district theater, and led the ensemble of folk instruments. In 1953, he won the Republican Olympiad of Young Talents. Gulu Asgarov studied at the Baku Music College named after Asaf Zeynally in 1953–1958.

His tapes are protected by the AzTV Foundation. For many years, Gulu Asgarov worked as a soloist at the Azerbaijan State Opera and Ballet Theater. He created a number of characters in mugham operas on this stage: Majnun, Ibn-Salam, Karam (Uzeyir Hajibeyov – "Leyli and Majnun", "Asli and Kerem"), Ashig Garib (Zulfugar Hajibeyov – "Ashig Garib"), Shah Ismayil (Muslim Magomayev – "Shah Ismayil").

== Source ==
- Xəlilov, Vidadi (2012). "Dolanaram başına"nın heyrət aləmi... Bakı: Nərgiz. p. 211.
