= Gul Mohammad Pahalwan =

Uzbek leader

Gul Mohammad Pahalwan گل محمد پهلوان

Personal details
- Born: Jowzjan Province, Afghanistan
- Occupation: Politician

Gul Mohammad Pahlawan (or Gulo) was an Uzbek leader during the violent power-struggles of 1990s Afghanistan, and a brother (in some sources brother-in-law) of leader Abdul Malik Pahlawan. Gul Mohammad played a significant role in Abdul Malik's betrayal of and subsequent attacks against rival Uzbek Rashid Dostum, with Gul Mohammad leading on Dostum's forces in Jowzjan Province on 23 May 1997.
