= Drum Tower and Clock Tower (Bangkok) =

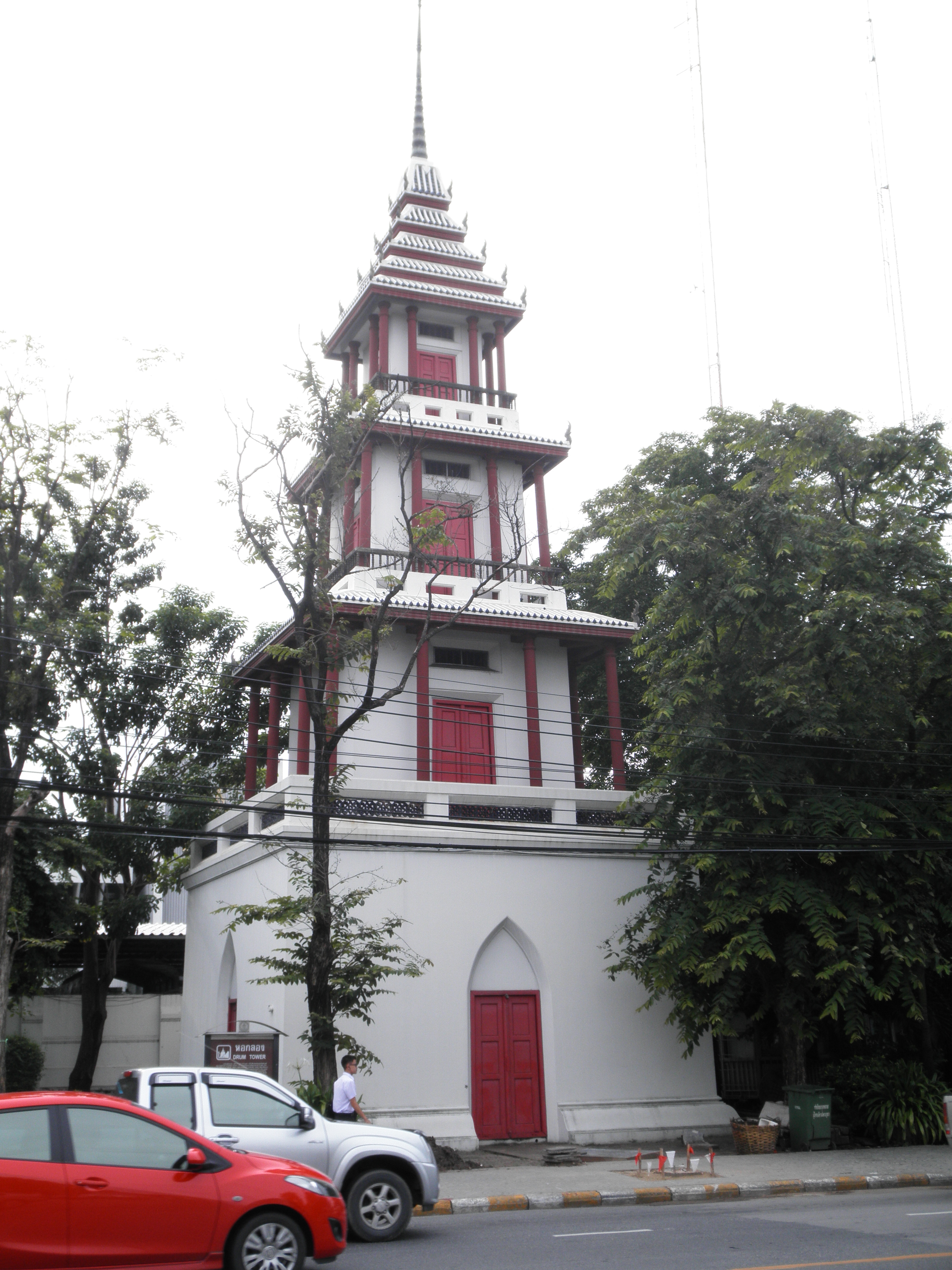
Drum Tower

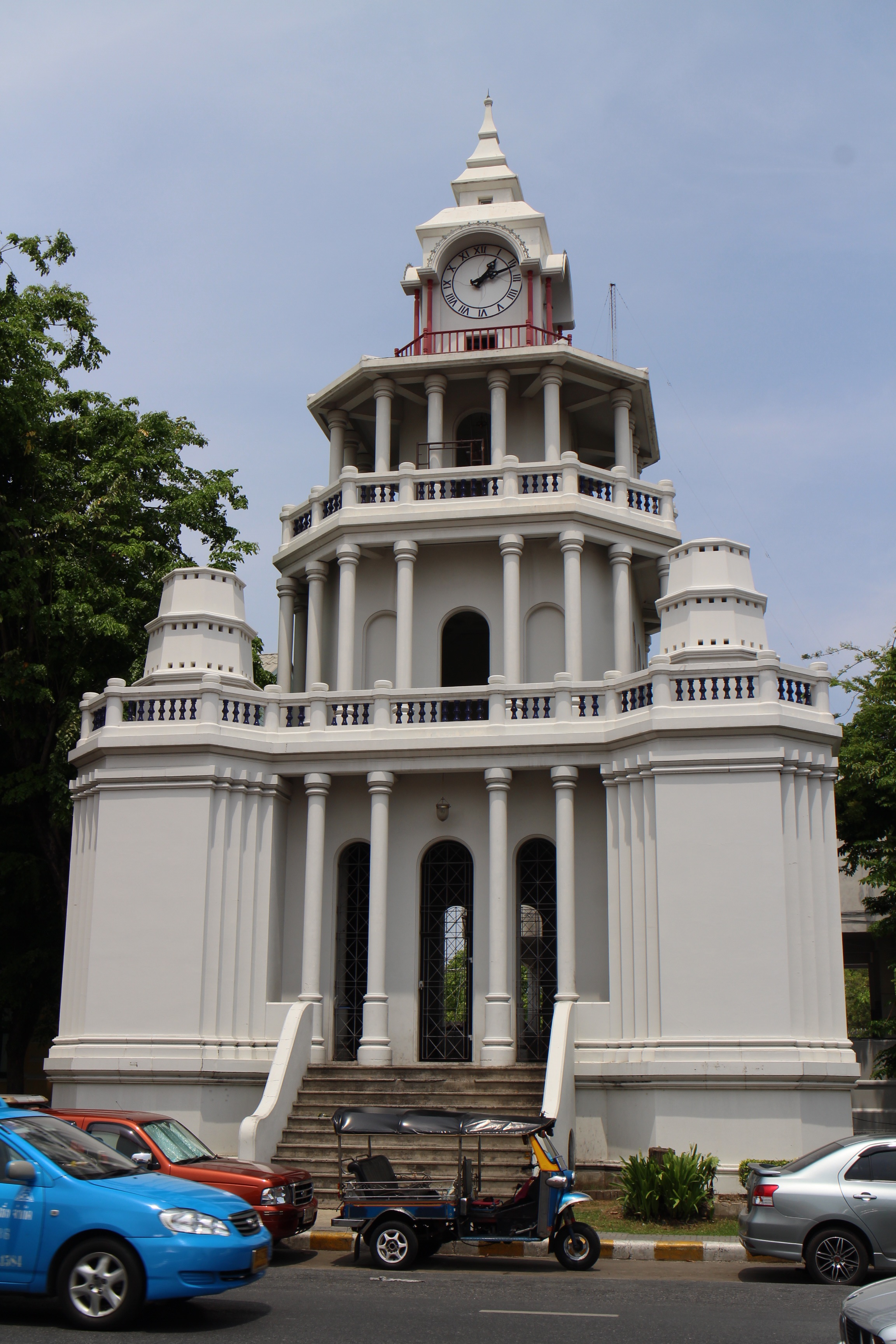
Clock Tower

Drum Tower (Thai: หอกลอง) is a historic building constructed in 1782 in Bangkok located on side of Sanam Chai Road, Phra Borom Maha Ratchawang Subdistrict, Phra Nakhon District, beside to Wat Pho and Territorial Defense Command. 13°44′45.88″N 100°29′40.06″E

Nearby there is also a Clock Tower (Thai: หอนาฬิกา). It is a replica of the clock tower built up to replace the first clock tower in Bangkok that used to be in the nearby Grand Palace during the King Rama IV's reign, it was built with the drum tower restored in 1982 on the occasion of the 250th anniversary of the Rattanakosin (present-day Bangkok). 13°44′47.84″N 100°29′40.17″E
