= Poladlı, Tartar =

Poladlı
- Municipality
- Location within Azerbaijan Location within Karabakh Economic Region
- Coordinates: 40°18′48″N 47°04′58″E
- Country: Azerbaijan
- Rayon: Tartar

Population
  - Total: 441
- Time zone: UTC+4 (AZT)
  - Summer (DST): UTC+5 (AZT)

Poladlı (also, Poladly and Polatly) is a village and municipality in the Tartar Rayon of Azerbaijan. It has a population of 441.
