= Gulowa Island =

Island in Papua New Guinea

- Interactive map of Gulowa Island

Geography
- Coordinates: 11.066°S 152.534°E
- Adjacent to: Solomon Sea

Administration
- Papua New Guinea
- Capital city: Port Moresby
- Largest settlement: Port Moresby
- Prime Minister: James Marape

Gulowa Island is an island of Papua New Guinea.
