= A478 road =

Major road in Wales

Coordinates: 51.89429°N 4.71348°W

A478

Route information
- Length: 31.8 mi (51.2 km)

Major junctions
- North end: Cardigan
- A487; A40 A4115 A477 A4218 A4139
- South end: Tenby

Location
- Country: United Kingdom
- Primary destinations: Cardigan; Tenby

Road network
- Roads in the United Kingdom; Motorways; A and B road zones

The A478 road is a major road in Wales. The route is from its junction with the A487 at Cardigan, Ceredigion, to Tenby, Pembrokeshire. It crosses the Preseli Hills and winds through farmland for almost all of its route. The road just touches the very west of Carmarthenshire.

== History ==
A road between Cardigan and Narberth was recorded between 1536 and 1642. The 1555 Highways Act made parishes responsible for the roads that crossed them. Most were unsuitable for wheeled traffic. Turnpike trusts were set up in the late 18th and early 19th centuries to manage road maintenance; at least part of this road came under the Whitland Trust. However, by the mid-19th century, some trusts were badly managed or abused, exacerbating rural poverty and in part leading to the Rebecca riots in the 1840s, some of the earliest of which were on this road, particularly at Efailwen in the Cilymaenllwyd Community. The trusts were reformed in 1844.

The northern two-thirds of the A478 was a drovers' road, used for transporting goods and livestock to and from West Wales and Ireland. In the 18th and 19th centuries, Cardigan was a port, the commercial centre of the region and the most important port in South Wales, exporting fish, agricultural products and raw materials, and involved in emigration. In 1815, it possessed 314 ships totalling 12,554 long tons (12,755 t), seven times more than Cardiff and three times more than Swansea. It had a thriving shipbuilding industry, with over 200 vessels being built both in Cardigan and downstream in the village of Llandudoch (St Dogmaels). When Cardigan was connected to the Carmarthen and Cardigan Railway in 1886, the decline of the port was hastened. The river silted up and larger vessels could no longer reach the port, which had largely become inactive by the early part of the 20th century.

== Route ==
=== Cardigan to Crymych ===
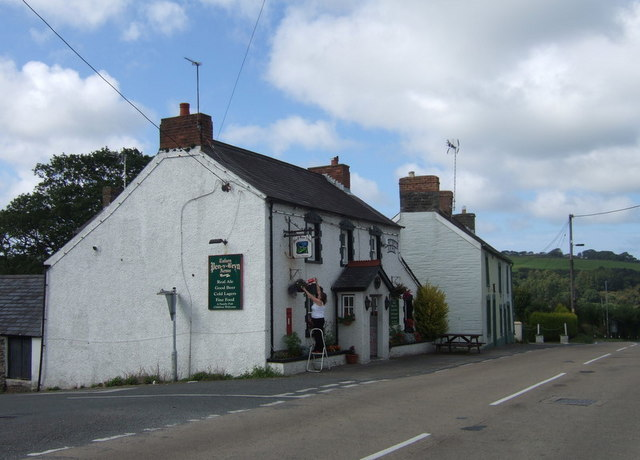
Pen-y-bryn Arms, Pen-y-bryn

Starting from the roundabout with the A487 south of Cardigan, the A478 soon crosses the county boundary into Pembrokeshire at Glanpwllafon, where it crosses Afon Piliau, a tributary of the River Teifi. The road passes through Pen-y-bryn in Bridell parish, crossing the River Plysgog, and climbs Rhoshill, crosses the B4332 Eglwyswrw-Cenarth road, then climbs the northern slopes of the eastern end of the Preseli Hills through Blaenffos village, bridging the River Nevern (near its source) at Riverlea, to Crymych village.

=== Crymych to Narberth ===
Still at an altitude of over 200 metres (660 ft), the A478 passes through Pentre Galar hamlet, crosses the county boundary to Carmarthenshire and passes a viewpoint near the summit of Carn Wen, where it reaches its highest altitude of 260 metres (850 ft). The quarrying at Carn Wen (also known as Garnwen) is clearly visible from the road; quarrying was active in 2025.

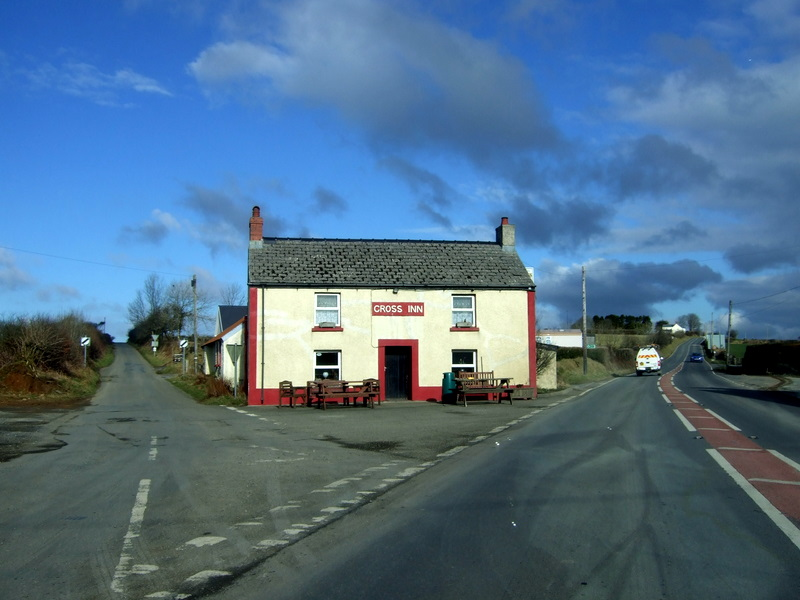
Looking north, the A478 is on the right of The Cross Inn at Glandy Cross

Passing through Glandy Cross and Efailwen (the location of the first of the Rebecca Riots) the A478 crosses the county boundary back into Pembrokeshire, passing through Llandissilio to the railway station at Clunderwen. The A478 then crosses the A40 trunk road between Llanddewi Velfrey and Penblewin, to the west of St Clears, at the Penblewin roundabout and passes through Narberth town centre where it meets the B4314.

=== Narberth to Tenby ===
After Narberth, the road passes through Camp Hill and Templeton, then crosses the A4115 near Templeton Airfield. After passing the Folly Farm Adventure Park and Zoo and continuing through Begelly (Welsh: Begeli) it crosses the A477 road on a roundabout. The B4316, a left turn, is to Saundersfoot railway station and an alternative way to Saundersfoot. Continuing on the A478 and passing through Pentlepoir, Wooden and Moreton at the roundabout at Twycross it reconnects with the other end of the B4316; the preferred route to Saundersfoot. The A478 continues south through New Hedges following the coast. After its junction with the A4139 and Tenby High Street, the A478 runs to the side of North Beach and terminates at the harbour by the town wall.

== Traffic ==
The majority of traffic on the A478 is local, agricultural and, in season, tourist traffic. In 2012, Pembrokeshire County Council said the A478 at New Hedges, near Tenby, carried an average of 9,900 vehicles a day. There were 10 deaths as a result of road accidents on the A478 between 1999 and 2010, compared with the county's total of 80 road deaths for that period.

== See also ==
- British road numbering scheme
