= Drum tower (Europe) =

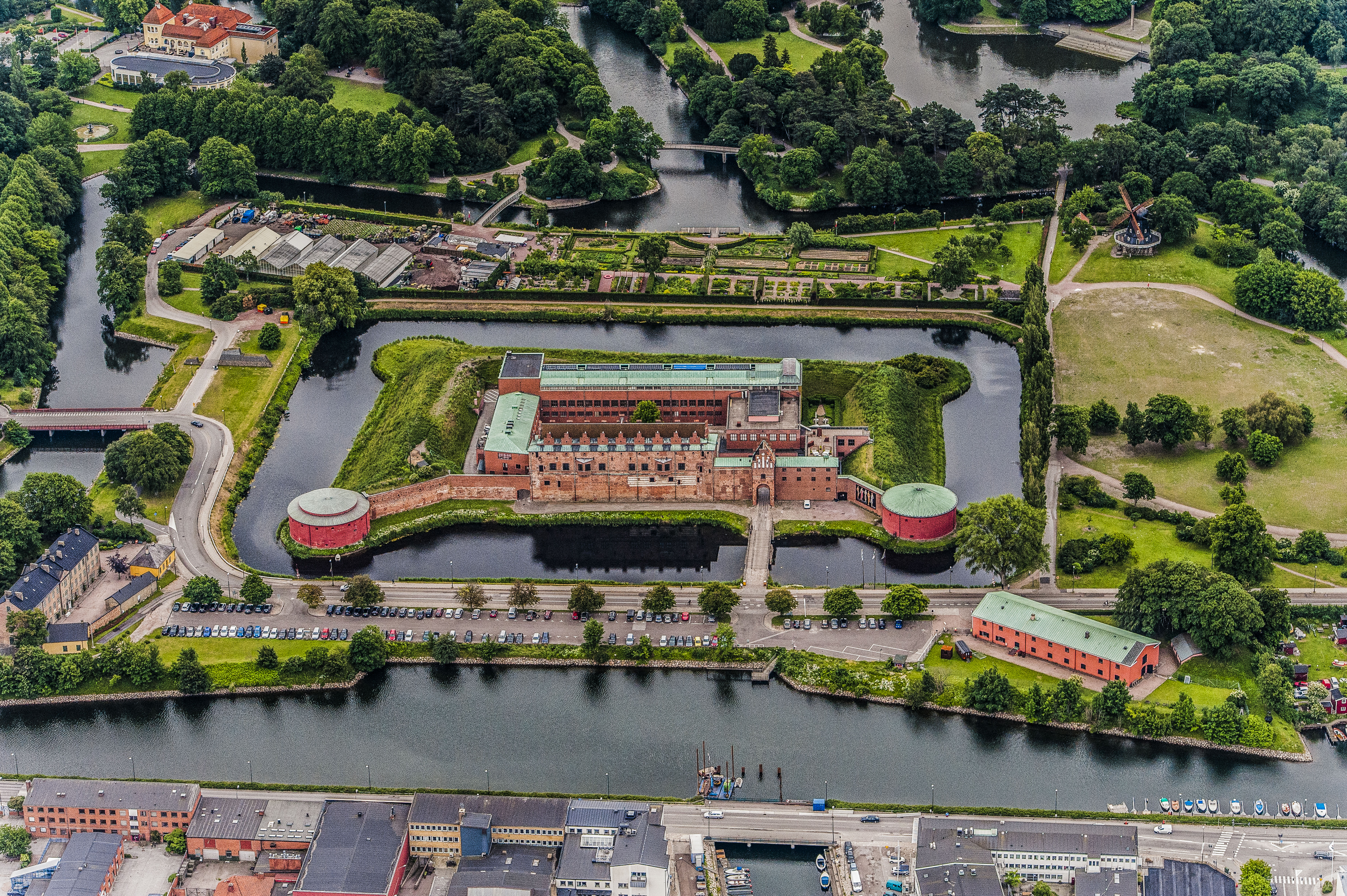
The Malmö Castle has two drum towers which, in having a larger diameter length than height, have a drum shape.

A Drum tower in Europe is a round tower that has a longer diameter length than height, resembling the shape of the musical instrument. Sometimes the term is used erroneously to describe typical round Norman defense towers or circular towers in general.
