= Poladlı, Aghjabadi =

Poladlı
- Municipality
- Location within Azerbaijan Location within Karabakh Economic Region
- Coordinates: 40°06′59″N 47°11′45″E
- Country: Azerbaijan
- Rayon: Aghjabadi

Population
  - Total: 1,300
- Time zone: UTC+4 (AZT)
  - Summer (DST): UTC+5 (AZT)

Poladlı (also known as Poladly or Polatly) is a village and municipality in the Aghjabadi Rayon of Azerbaijan. It has a population of 1,300.
