= Thomas Frederick Colby =

British general and cartographer (1784–1852)

Major-General Thomas Frederick Colby FRS FRSE FRGS FRAS
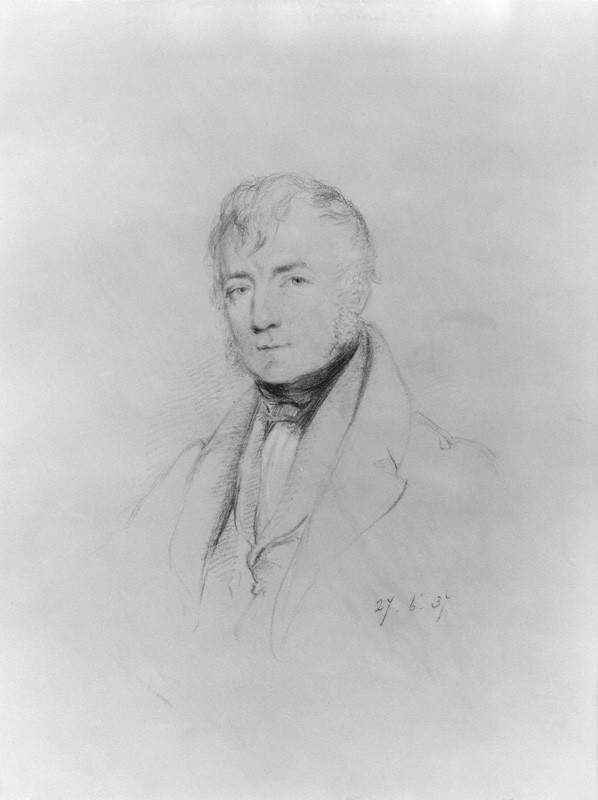
- Drawing by William Brockedon, 1837
- Born: 1 September 1784; Rochester, Kent, England
- Died: 9 October 1852 (aged 68) New Brighton, Cheshire, England

Thomas Frederick Colby FRS FRSE FRGS FRAS (1 September 1784 – 9 October 1852) was a British Army major-general and director of the Ordnance Survey (OS). A Fellow of the Royal Astronomical Society and Royal Society, Colby was one of the leading geographers of his time.

An officer in the Royal Engineers, Colby overcame the loss of one hand in a shooting accident to begin in 1802 a lifelong connection with the Ordnance Survey. His most important work was the Survey of Ireland. He began planning this enormous enterprise in 1824 and directed it until 1846, in which year the final maps made by the survey were almost ready for issue. He was the inventor of the "Colby Bar" (a compensation bar), an apparatus used in base-measurements.

== Early life ==
He was the eldest child of Major Thomas Colby, Royal Marines (died 1813) and his wife, Cornelia Hadden, sister of James Murray Hadden. He was born at St. Margaret's-next-Rochester on 1 September 1784. Colby was brought up by his father's sisters at Rhosygilwen, near Rhoshill, Pembrokeshire, West Wales. He attended school at Northfleet, Kent, under William Crakelt. He went on to the Royal Military Academy, Woolwich and passed out for the Royal Engineers while still 16.

Colby attracted the notice of Major William Mudge, director of the Ordnance Survey, who arranged in 1802 to have him attached to the Survey. His first task was sector observations made at Dunnose, Isle of Wight in the summer of 1802. In December 1803, when on duty at Liskeard, Colby met with an accident through the bursting of a pistol loaded with small shot with which he was practising, his left hand having to be amputated at the wrist and part of the gun being permanently lodged in the skull. In 1804 he was observing the pole star for azimuths at Beaumaris; in 1806 he was assisting Mudge in the measurement of a base-line on Rhuddlan Marsh, near St. Asaph and in astronomical observations in Delamere Forest, Cheshire and on the Yorkshire moors. Later he was selecting trigonometrical stations on the mountains in South Wales.

The publication of the maps themselves was suspended during the Napoleonic Wars. In July 1809, Mudge was appointed lieutenant governor of the Royal Military Academy, Woolwich and Colby became the chief executive officer of the Survey.

== Scottish survey ==
In 1813 it was decided to extend the measurement of the meridional line between Dunnose and the mouth of the River Tees into Scotland, with a mineralogical survey being carried out by John MacCulloch. In that and the following year Colby and his chief assistant, James Gardner, were selecting stations in the south-west of Scotland, and observing from them by theodolite. In 1815 Colby worked from Tower map office, but in 1816–17 he was again in the field, carrying the triangulation round the eastern coast towards Orkney and Shetland, and in the latter year, in conjunction with Gardner, measured the base-line of Belhelvie Links, near Aberdeen, the only base-line in Scotland. He was also engaged in observations in Shetland with Jean-Baptiste Biot, who had been deputed by the Institut de France to make pendulum and other observations there in connection with the prolongation of the arc of the meridian. Biot and Colby fell out, however.

Colby later accompanied General Mudge to Dunkirk, and took part in the observations made, with Biot and François Arago, using Jesse Ramsden's sector, which was set up in Dunkirk arsenal. In 1819 Colby was again engaged in Scotland, the season's work beginning, early in May, on Corrie Habbie, Banff, and ending in Caithness at the end of September. Colby was made LL.D. of the University of Aberdeen and Fellow of the Royal Society of Edinburgh.

The survey required detailed measurements to be made at each location, often over days or weeks as weather permitted. When working on remote hills, Colby and his men built structures from local stone or turf to provide shelter. Some of these structures can still be seen on Scottish hills, where they are known as Colby camps or surveyors' camps.

== In London ==
Early in 1820 General Mudge died, and the Duke of Wellington appointed Colby to succeed him at the head of the Ordnance Survey. On 13 April 1820 Colby became a Fellow of the Royal Society. Later in the same year Lord Melville nominated him to a seat on the Board of Longitude, which he retained until it was dissolved in 1828. He also became an associate and then an honorary member of the Institution of Civil Engineers. At this time living in London, he was among the proprietors of the London Institute, and was one of the early members of the Athenaeum Club. He was also one of the founders of the Royal Astronomical Society, and with Mark Beaufoy, Olinthus Gregory, Edward Troughton, and others, drew up its rules.

There was a pause the mountain work of the survey; but in 1821 Colby was employed in making observations in Orkney and Shetland, and on Fair Isle and Foula; and in 1821-3 he was sent by the Royal Society with Henry Kater to co-operate with Arago and Claude-Louis Mathieu for the Institut de France, in connecting the observations of Greenwich and Paris. The results were published in Philosophical Transactions for 1828. Fresnel's new compound lenses were used for the observations across the English Channel. Colby gave his notes on them to his friend Robert Stevenson, leading to their adoption in British lighthouses.

== Irish survey ==
In 1824 Colby and the Ordnance Survey were given the task of surveying Ireland. He also decided to have the work carried on under direct official supervision, and raised three companies of sappers and miners to be trained in survey duties. Later many Irish surveyors were used. It began with Colby and a small party of sappers on Divis near Belfast, in 1825. He devised a dual arrangement of brass and iron, called by him a "compensation bar", which as the "Colby bar" was used base-measurements in all parts of the world. A base-line, eight miles long, was measured under his superintendence, on the southern side of Lough Foyle, in 1827–8. When the standard yard was destroyed in the 1834 Burning of Parliament, it was restored by going back to Colby's work.

Initially trained staff were in short supply, and progress was slow. A committee headed by Sir James Carmichael Smyth recommended more rapid, but less accurate methods. This approach was abandoned in 1832. In May 1833 the publication of the first Irish county—Londonderry—in fifty sheets, took place. Other counties followed, and the completion of the map in 1847 saw 1,939 sheets, surveyed and plotted on a scale of six inches to the mile. Colby exceeded by large sums the budgets sanctioned by parliament, and forwent his own salary. The survey included a series of tidal observations. Colby during its progress introduced electrotyping, contour lines on the six-inch maps, and the training of picked men of the sappers and miners as surveyors.

== Later life ==
In 1833, Henry De la Beche suggested a geological map of the west of England, which was handed over by the government to Colby. The arrangement continued in force until 1845, when the geological survey was transferred to the Department of Woods and Forests. Apart from this project, and the publication of the sheets of the one-inch ordnance map of England and Wales, the operations of the British survey were at a standstill after the death of Mudge until 1838, when the survey of Scotland was resumed, and Colby moved back from Dublin to London. In that year he went back into the field for the last time, on Ben Hutig in Sutherlandshire.

In 1840, the government agreed to survey the remaining six counties in England (Lancashire, Yorkshire, Cumberland, Westmoreland, Durham, and Northumberland) and the whole of Scotland, on the six-inch scale, while the publication of the one-inch map continued for the rest of England. The assistants employed on the Irish survey were gradually transferred to England and Scotland. The work was proceeding slowly when, in November 1846, just as the sheets of the last Irish county were preparing for issue, Colby attained the rank of major-general, and in accordance with the rule of the service was retired from the post he had so long held.

Colby devoted himself to the education of his sons, residing for some time at Bonn. He died at New Brighton, on 9 October 1852, aged 68. A monument was erected to him in St James Cemetery, Liverpool.

== Works ==
In 1811 appeared the third volume of the Trigonometrical Survey, by Mudge and Colby.

== Family ==
In 1828 Colby married Elizabeth Hester Boyd, second daughter of Archibald Boyd of Londonderry. They had a family of four sons and three daughters. After his marriage Colby moved from London to Dublin, residing at first in Merrion Square, and afterwards at Knockmaroon Lodge, at the gates of Phoenix Park, within easy distance of the survey office, which was established in the old Mountjoy barracks.

== Legacy ==
Colby House, which was the headquarters of the OS Northern Ireland until 2014, is named in his honour.

== Notes ==
Attribution: This article incorporates text from a publication now in the public domain: Stephen, Leslie, ed. (1887). "Colby, Thomas Frederick". Dictionary of National Biography. Vol. 11. London: Smith, Elder & Co.
