= Gulov =

Gulov or Gulova is a surname. Notable people with the surname include:

- Alisher Gulov (born 1989), Tajikistani taekwondo practitioner
- Leonid Gulov (born 1981), Estonian rower
