= Gulu railway station =

Railway station in Tibet, China

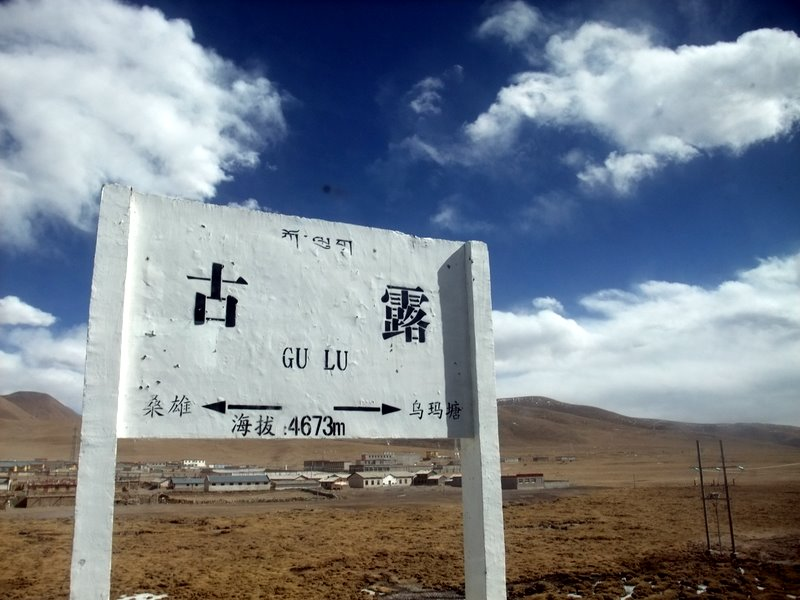
Gulu station sign

Gulu station (古露站) is a railway station in Tibet Autonomous Region, People's Republic of China, on the Qingzang Railway. Tracks were laid to Gulu station in 2004.

== See also ==
- Qingzang Railway
- List of stations on Qingzang railway

Preceding station	China Railway	Following station
Sangxiong towards Xining	Qinghai–Tibet railway	Wumatang towards Lhasa
