= Earl Lloyd-George of Dwyfor =

Peerage title

- Blazon Arms: Azure, and over water barry wavy Argent and Azure, a Bridge of one arch proper, on a Chief Argent, a Portcullis Sable, between two Daffodils, stalked and leaved proper.
- Creation date: 12 February 1945
- Created by: King George VI
- Peerage: Peerage of the United Kingdom
- First holder: David Lloyd George
- Present holder: David Richard Owen Lloyd George, 4th Earl Lloyd-George of Dwyfor
- Heir apparent: William Lloyd George, Viscount Gwynedd
- Remainder to: 1st Earl's heirs male of the body lawfully begotten
- Subsidiary titles: Viscount Gwynedd
- Status: Extant
- Former seat: Ffynone House
- Motto: Y gwir yn erbyn y byd (The truth against the world)

Earl Lloyd-George of Dwyfor (Welsh: Iarll Lloyd-George o Ddwyfor) is a title in the peerage of the United Kingdom. It was created in 1945 for Liberal parliamentarian David Lloyd George who served as Chancellor of the Exchequer from 1908 to 1915 and Prime Minister of the United Kingdom from 1916 to 1922. He was created Viscount Gwynedd, of Dwyfor in the County of Caernarvon, also in the Peerage of the United Kingdom, at the same time.

Lloyd George's family name is not hyphenated, although it was required to appear as such in his title, as in other cases such as Andrew Lloyd Webber, Baron Lloyd-Webber.

Both the territorial designations Dwyfor and Gwynedd are ancient Welsh placenames. They were subsequently revived, in 1974, for a local government district and county respectively.

The family titles are currently held by his great-grandson, the 4th Earl, who succeeded his father in 2010.

Two of David Lloyd George's children also earned distinction in public life. His second son, the Hon. Gwilym Lloyd George, was Home Secretary from 1954 to 1957 before being created Viscount Tenby in 1957; and his daughter Megan Lloyd George represented Anglesey and Carmarthen in the House of Commons.

The family seat during the 3rd Earl's lifetime was Ffynone House, near Boncath, Pembrokeshire.

== Earls Lloyd-George of Dwyfor (1945) ==
- David Lloyd George, 1st Earl Lloyd-George of Dwyfor (1863–1945) — Prime Minister of the United Kingdom (1916–1922)
- Richard Lloyd George, 2nd Earl Lloyd-George of Dwyfor (1889–1968)
- Owen Lloyd George, 3rd Earl Lloyd-George of Dwyfor (1924–2010)
- David Richard Owen Lloyd George, 4th Earl Lloyd-George of Dwyfor (born 1951).

== Present peer ==
David Richard Owen Lloyd George, 4th Earl Lloyd-George of Dwyfor (born 22 January 1951), the son of the third earl and his wife Ruth Margaret Coit, was educated at Eton College. He was styled as Viscount Gwynedd between 1968 and 2010, when he succeeded to the peerages.

In 1985, he married Pamela Alexandra Kleyff, a daughter of Alexander Kleyff, and they have two children:

- William Alexander Lloyd George, Viscount Gwynedd (born 1986), a journalist.
- Frederick Owen Lloyd George (born 1987), Assistant Equerry to Queen Camilla and like his great-great-grandfather a Freeman of the Curriers' Company.

== Line of succession ==
- David Lloyd George, 1st Earl Lloyd-George of Dwyfor (1863–1945)
  - Richard Lloyd George, 2nd Earl Lloyd-George of Dwyfor (1889–1968)
    - Owen Lloyd George, 3rd Earl Lloyd-George of Dwyfor (1924–2010)
      - David Richard Owen Lloyd George, 4th Earl Lloyd-George of Dwyfor (born 1951)
        - (1) William Alexander Lloyd George, Viscount Gwynedd (born 1986)
        - (2) Hon. Frederick Owen Lloyd George (born 1987)
          - (3) Thomas Lloyd George (born 2018)
      - (4) Hon. Robert John Daniel Lloyd George (born 1952)
        - (5) Richard Joseph Lloyd George (born 1983)
        - (6) Alexander Gwilym Lloyd George (born 1994)
        - (7) Nicholas John Lloyd George (born 1998)
        - (8) Robert Owen Lloyd George (born 1999)
        - (9) David Charles Lloyd George (born 2002)
  - Gwilym Lloyd George, 1st Viscount Tenby (1894–1967)
    - David Lloyd George, 2nd Viscount Tenby (1922–1983)
    - William Lloyd George, 3rd Viscount Tenby (1927–2023)
      - (10) Timothy Henry Gwilym Lloyd George, 4th Viscount Tenby (born 1962)

== Arms ==
Coat of arms of Lloyd George, Earls Lloyd-George of Dwyfor
Coronet That of an Earl. Crest A demi-dragon Gules holding between the claws a portcullis Sable. Escutcheon Azure over water barry wavy in base a bridge of one arch Proper, on a chief Argent a portcullis Sable between two daffodils stalked and leaved Proper. Supporters Dexter, a Dragon Or, Sinister, an Eagle, wings addorsed Or, each gorged with a Collar Vert. Motto Y gwir yn erbyn y byd (Welsh: The truth against the world).

== See also ==
- Viscount Tenby
- Dowager Countess Lloyd-George of Dwyfor
