= Capel Colman =

Parish in Pembrokeshire, Wales

Coordinates: 52.0149°N 4.5992°W

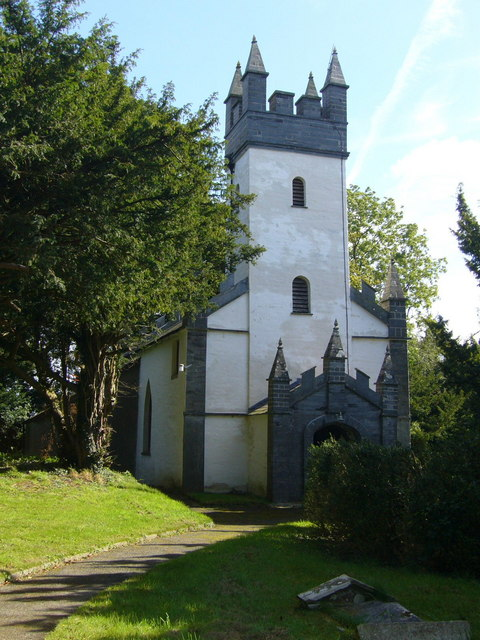
- St Colman's Church

- Location within Pembrokeshire
- OS grid reference: SN217384
- Community: Boncath
- Principal area: Pembrokeshire
- Country: Wales
- Sovereign state: United Kingdom
- Post town: Boncath
- Postcode district: SA
- Dialling code: 01239
- Police: Dyfed-Powys
- Fire: Mid and West Wales
- Ambulance: Welsh
- UK Parliament: Preseli Pembrokeshire
- Senedd Cymru – Welsh Parliament: Preseli Pembrokeshire

Capel Colman is a parish in northeast Pembrokeshire, Wales, in the community of Boncath. Formerly in the Hundred of Cilgerran, Capel Colman is a small, rural parish of some 750 acres (300 ha) surrounded by the larger parishes of Cilgerran, Manordeifi, Clydau, Penrydd and Llanfihangel Penbedw. The parish is in the Manordeifi group in the Church in Wales Diocese of St David's.

The parish is named in some historical sources as Llangolman, but this is not to be confused with Llangolman, a village a few miles to the south of Capel Colman.

== History ==
The recorded history of Capel Colman can be traced back at least to the 14th century, when it was a chapelry in the parish of Manordeifi. It was marked on a 1578 parish map of Pembrokeshire. In 1594 it was a Crown property which was subsequently abandoned until it was re-endowed by the Anglican Church in the 18th century.

There was a parish school in Capel Colman: David Jones is listed as schoolmaster in 1737. The population of the parish in 1801 was 71, the majority of whom worked in agriculture.

In Liber ecclesiasticus, an 1835 report on the state of the established church, Capel Colman is described as a parish with a population of 130, valued at £72, patron Morgan Jones Esq.

In the mid-19th century about 60 acres (24 ha) of the parish were woodland with the rest split between arable land and pasture. Corn, butter and cheese were the principal produce. The Lord of the Manor in 1849 was Pryse Pryse.

Wilson's Gazetteer of 1872 described Capel Colman as a parish of 770 acres with a population of 157 living in 30 houses with Miss Jones of Cilwendeg the patron. By 1961 the population of the parish had risen to 171.

== Church of St Colman ==
The church is dedicated to St Colman, an Irish saint of the 6th or 7th century; however, as there were several saints of the same name it is not clear which is referred to. The present building dates from around 1720, having previously been abandoned; it was later rebuilt and restored, and is now a listed building. The font is mediaeval. The church was rebuilt in 1837 for Morgan Jones of Cilwendeg but was reported as in need of repair in 1859. It was refurbished again in the 1890s.

Some sources describe St Colman as a chapel (hence the name of the parish), and some a church, and it may have been a chapel for Cilwendeg (see below) as it stands at the edge of Cilwendeg Park. It is referred to as a chapelry in tithe documents of the mid-18th century, and church appointments for 1771-2 are listed on the CCE database.

Extant parish records include Bishops Transcripts (1806–1878), baptisms (1813–1987), marriages (1770–1970) and burials (1824–1991), all held at the National Library of Wales. Capel Colman parish is in the benefice of the Manordeifi Group in the Church in Wales.

The parish was a joint perpetual curacy with the rector of Llanfihangel Penbedw from the 19th century. The Clergy List for 1841 notes that A. Brigstoke had been curate since 1833. In 1866 T Rogers was the incumbent, followed in 1888 by David Worthington, replacing David Lewis.

In 1878 a Harvest Thanksgiving Service was held in the church in the morning, and at Llanfihangel Penbedw in the afternoon with sermons and services in English and Welsh by clergy from several neighbouring parishes. All the clergy were invited to dinner by Mrs Lloyd of Kilrhue.

A major improvement in the church was made in 1895. The Western Mail reported:

"One of the very few remaining old churches of the upper portion of Pembrokeshire...Capel Colman, near Boncath, is being replaced by a new and handsome sacred edifice, which will be opened at the end of June. Since the appointment of the Rev. W.G. Phillips to the living of Capel Colman and Llanfihangel Penbedw, rapid strides have been made, until at the present time the number of communicants have reached 80. Mr Phillips has not only succeeded in raising a very handsome vicarage, but he has also taken in hand the restoration of his Parish Church with a like success, and in aid thereof a most successful and well-attended bazaar and open-air fete was held in the beautiful grounds of Cilwendeg...which was opened by Mrs Wodehouse (Pentre) in the presence of a large number of spectators."

In 1897 Rev. Morris James Marsden BA was appointed to the Perpetual Curacy of Capel Colman and Rectory of Llanfihangel Penbedw.

== Cilwendeg House ==
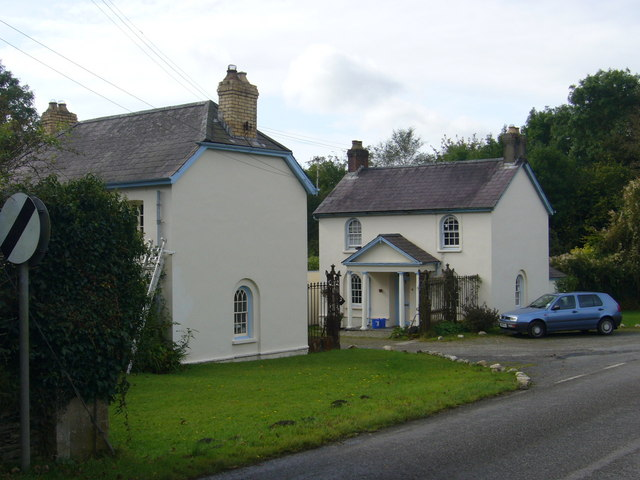
Lodges at one of the entrances to Cilwendeg

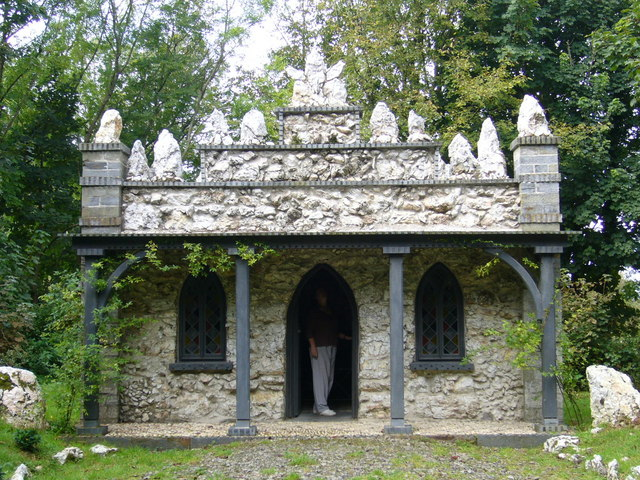
Cilwendeg Shell House Hermitage

Cilwendeg House, described as one of the most important mansions in Pembrokeshire, dates from the late 18th century and was built on the site of a former property dating back to the 1500s. It is a Grade-II listed building, along with other structures associated with it, either Grade-II or Grade-II*. The earliest recorded incumbents in the early 16th century were named Llewelyn, and in the early 17th century it was acquired by lawyer Jacob Morgan. In the 18th century it passed by marriage to the Jones family.

In 1780 the house was rebuilt by Morgan Jones senior.

Lewis's Topographical Dictionary (1849) describes Cilwendeg as:

"...an elegant mansion, erected within the last seventy years, is ornamented with a receding portico in good taste, and occupies the centre of an extensive demesne, beautifully laid out in plantations and pleasure-grounds, to which are entrances by two handsome lodges, more recently built; the lawn in front of the house embraces a view of some of the finest scenery in the county, including the luxuriant woods around Fynnonau."

The gardens are listed at Grade II* on the Cadw/ICOMOS Register of Parks and Gardens of Special Historic Interest in Wales. One of the features is the Grade II* listed Shell House built in the late 1820s which was restored with the support of local residents and the Temple Trust in 2004. A more detailed description of the house and extensive array of outbuildings is given in the 2004 Buildings of Wales volume Pembrokeshire.

The 21 bedroom mansion was a care home from 1952 to 2010. Cilwendeg Park is the venue for Teifi Valley Motor Club's annual Rali Cilwendeg, and Cilwendeg Farm hosted the 2013 Urdd Eisteddfod. The estate was sold into private ownership in 2015, and the house has undergone a restoration for opening in 2019 as a residential and event venue.
