= Manordeifi Old Church =

Coordinates: 52.0584°N 4.5855°W

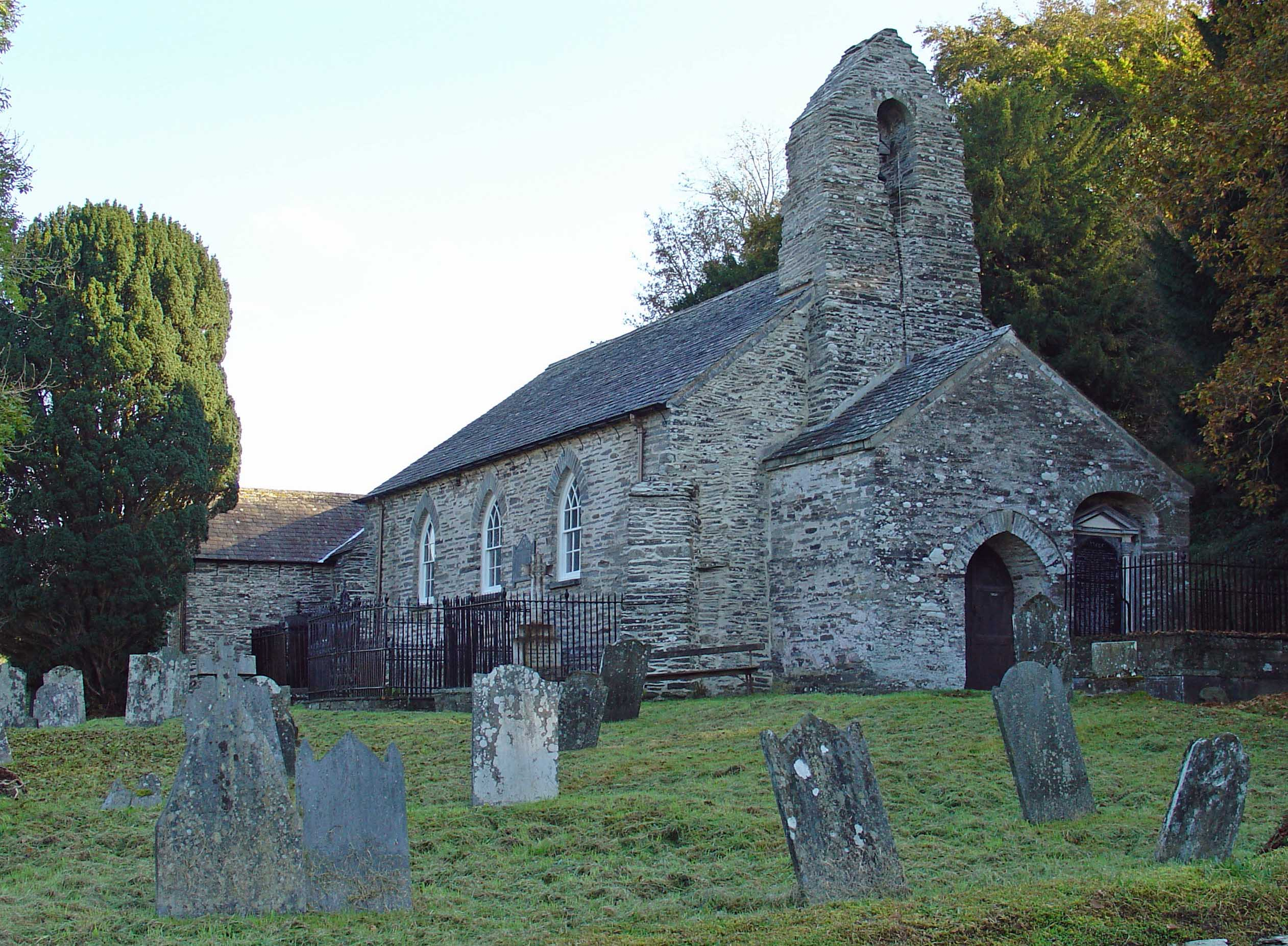
- Manordeifi Old Church from the northwest

- Location in Pembrokeshire
- OS grid reference: SN 228 431
- Location: Manordeifi, Pembrokeshire
- Country: Wales
- Denomination: Church in Wales
- Website: Friends of Friendless Churches

History
- Dedication: Saint David
- Dedicated: 12th century

Architecture
- Functional status: Redundant
- Heritage designation: Grade II*
- Designated: 24 November 1994
- Architectural type: Church
- Style: Gothic
- Groundbreaking: 13th or 14th century

Specifications
- Materials: Stone, slate roofs

Manordeifi Old Church is a redundant church in Manordeifi, Pembrokeshire, Wales. It is designated by Cadw as a Grade II* listed building, and is under the care of the Friends of Friendless Churches. The church stands near the River Teifi and worshippers were sometimes trapped when the river flooded. They were then ferried home in a coracle that was kept in the church porch for this purpose. The church is no longer used for regular worship, but the tradition of keeping a coracle in the porch continues. When it was stolen, local people raised money for it to be replaced.

== History ==
The site is thought to have been occupied by a church since the 6th or 7th century, dedicated to Llawddog, a Celtic saint. From the evidence of an inscription on the bell, it is believed that it was later dedicated to Saint Lawrence. When the parish was created in the 12th century, the dedication was changed to Saint David. The nave and chancel of the present church date from the 13th or 14th century, and the porch was added at a "slightly later" date. It was probably altered in the 18th century, and repaired between 1835 and 1844. It was abandoned as a parish church in 1899. The church was repaired in 1905 and again between 1948 and 1973. It was vested with the charity the Friends of Friendless Churches in 2000, who hold a 999-year lease with effect from 10 August 2000.

== Architecture ==
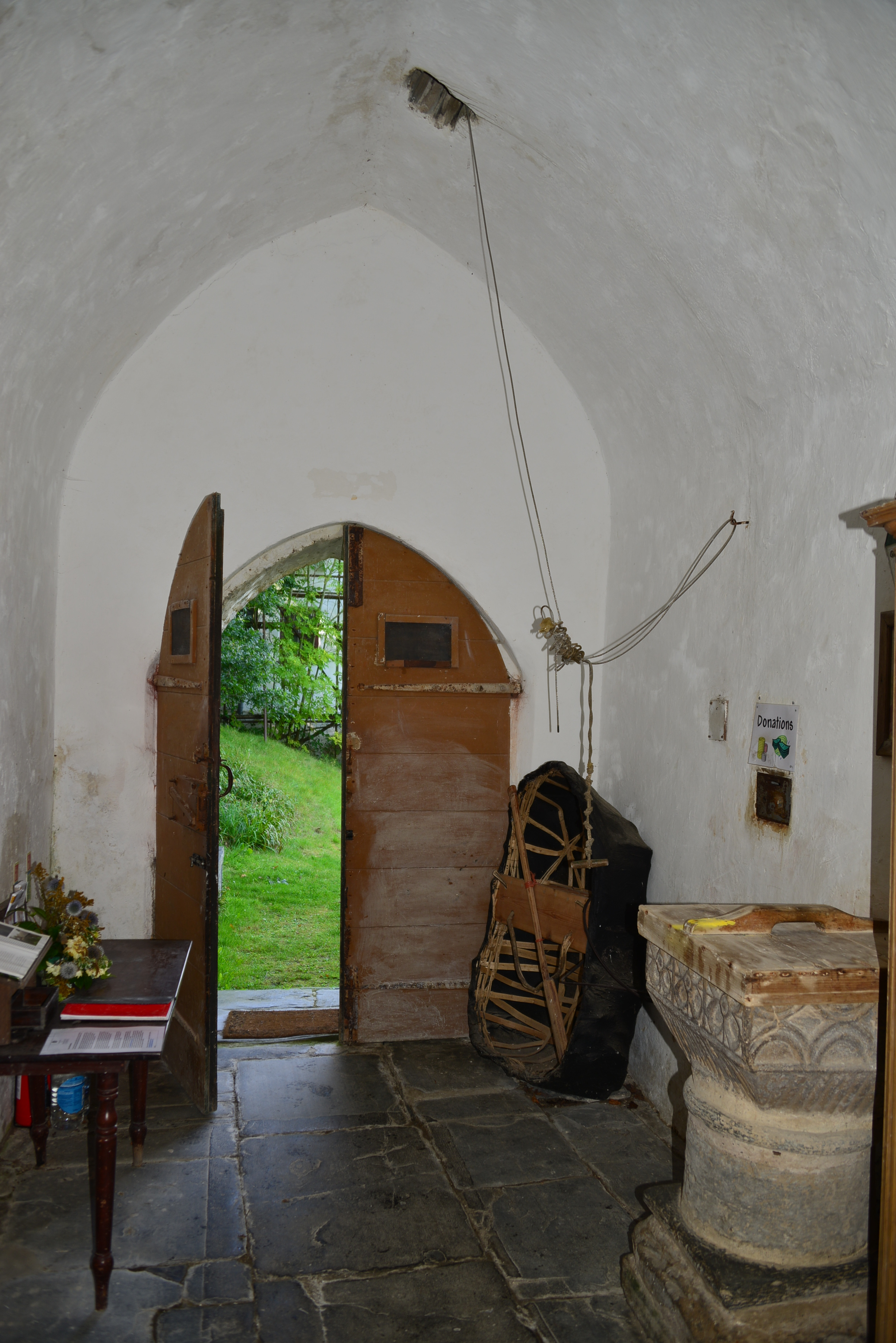
Church interior, showing the coracle kept in the porch

The church is constructed in stone and has slate roofs. Its plan consists of a nave and a chancel, with a large west porch, a north vestry, and a single bellcote at the west end. The interior is plastered and whitewashed, while the floor of the nave is paved with slates with a three-sided altar platform in the chancel. The church contains box pews, four of them being larger for the use of the more prominent local families; the two easternmost of these are furnished with fireplaces. Elsewhere are open-back benches. The pulpit is plain and is partly built into one of the pews. The font is square on a circular shaft and a square base. The font dates from the 13th century, while the bell is from the 15th century. In the church are a number of monuments, one of which commemorates Charles Colby who was killed by a tiger in India in 1852. Another is to the memory of the Welsh poet John Blackwell who died in 1840 and is buried in the churchyard.
