= John Blackwell (Alun) =

British writer (1797–1840)

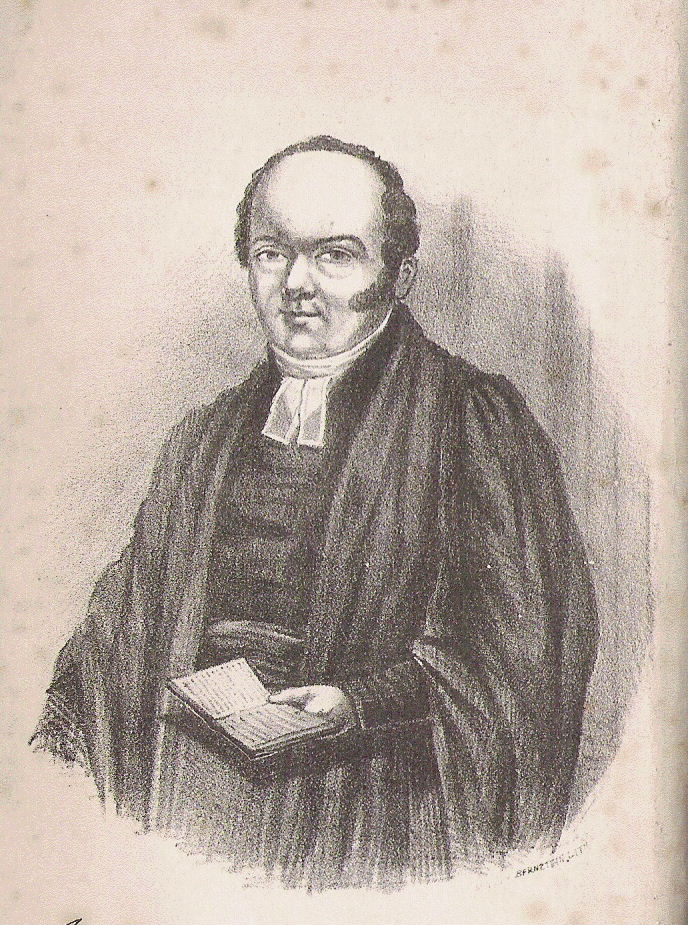
John Blackwell

John Blackwell (1797 – 19 May 1840), who used the bardic name Alun, was a Welsh language poet.

== Life ==
Blackwell was born near Mold, Flintshire, in north Wales, and followed the trade of a shoemaker. He won prizes offered for poems and essays in the Welsh language and, supported by friends, he entered Jesus College, Oxford, in 1824, graduating B.A. in 1828. In the autumn of that year, at the Royal Denbigh Eisteddvod, a prize was awarded him for his Welsh elegy on the death of Bishop Reginald Heber.

In 1829 Blackwell was ordained to the curacy of Holywell. During his residence there he contributed largely to the columns of Gwyliedydd, an Anglican periodical; and in 1832 he was presented with a prize medal at the Beaumaris Eisteddvod. In 1833 he was presented by Lord-chancellor Brougham to the living of Manor Deivy, in Pembrokeshire. Soon afterwards he became editor of an illustrated magazine in the Welsh, Y Cylchgrawn, which he ran successfully. He died on 14 May 1840, and was buried at Manor Deivy Church.

Blackwell's poems and essays, with a memoir of his life, were edited by the Rev. Griffith Edwards of Minera, in a volume entitled Ceinion Alun, Ruthin, 1851.
