= Cilgerran Hundred =

Hundred in Pembrokeshire, Wales

Coordinates: 51.990°N 4.561°W

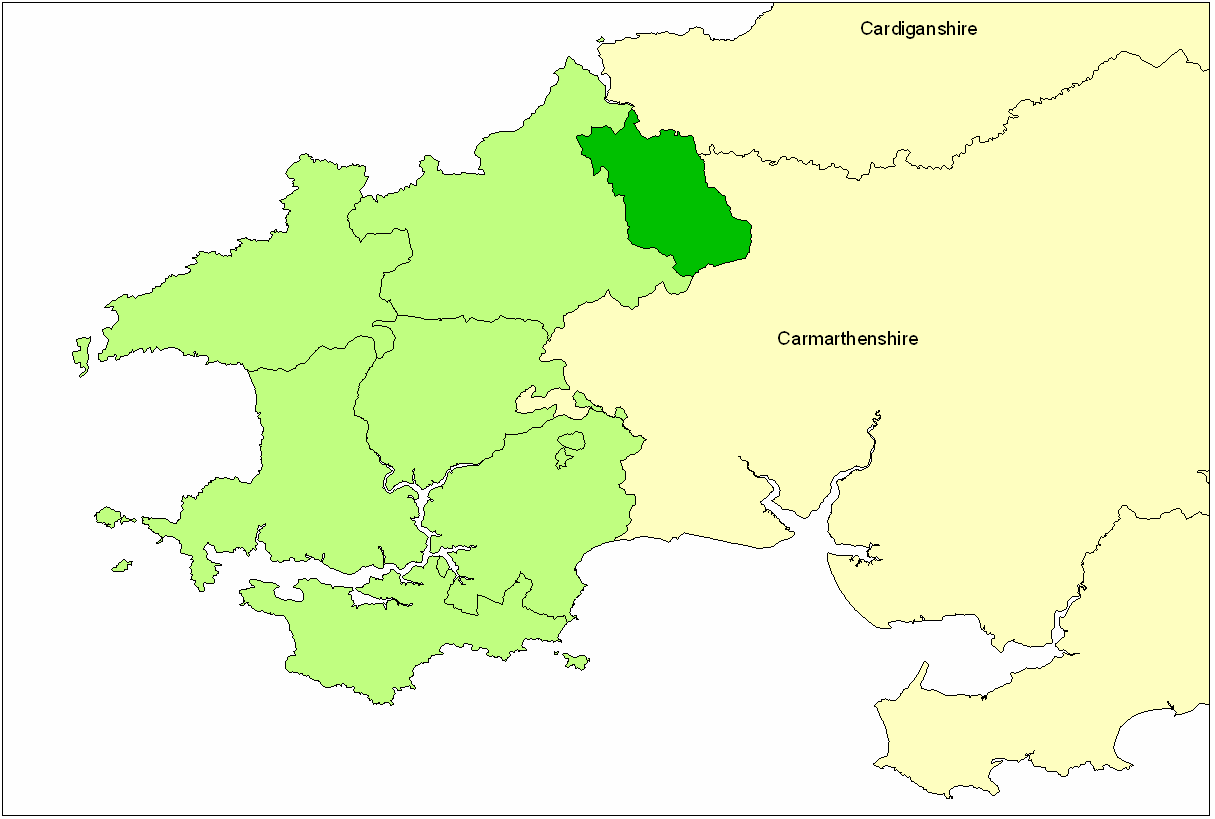
Pembrokeshire showing Cilgerran Hundred

The Hundred of Cilgerran (often written "Kilgerran") was a hundred in the north of Pembrokeshire, Wales. It was formed by the Act of Union of 1536 from the commote of the pre-Norman cantref of Emlyn included by the Act in Pembrokeshire and is otherwise called in Welsh Emlyn Is Cuch (Emlyn below the River Cuch), with the addition of the Cemais parish of Llantood. The area of the commote was about 106 km^{2}: that of the hundred was 113 km^{2}.

It was under the control of the medieval borough of Cilgerran. It was occupied by the Normans in the 12th century, and made part of the March, but remained exclusively Welsh-speaking. In addition to Cilgerran Castle, the Normans constructed at least one other castle in the commote: Castell Chrychydd in Clydau.

The commote comprised the parishes of Bridell, Cilgerran, Clydau, Capel Colman, Llanfihangel Penbedw, Manordeifi and Penrydd, and the western part of Cilrhedyn.
