= Richard Lloyd George, 2nd Earl Lloyd-George of Dwyfor =

Soldier and politician (1889–1968)

Major The Right Honourable The Earl Lloyd-George of Dwyfor
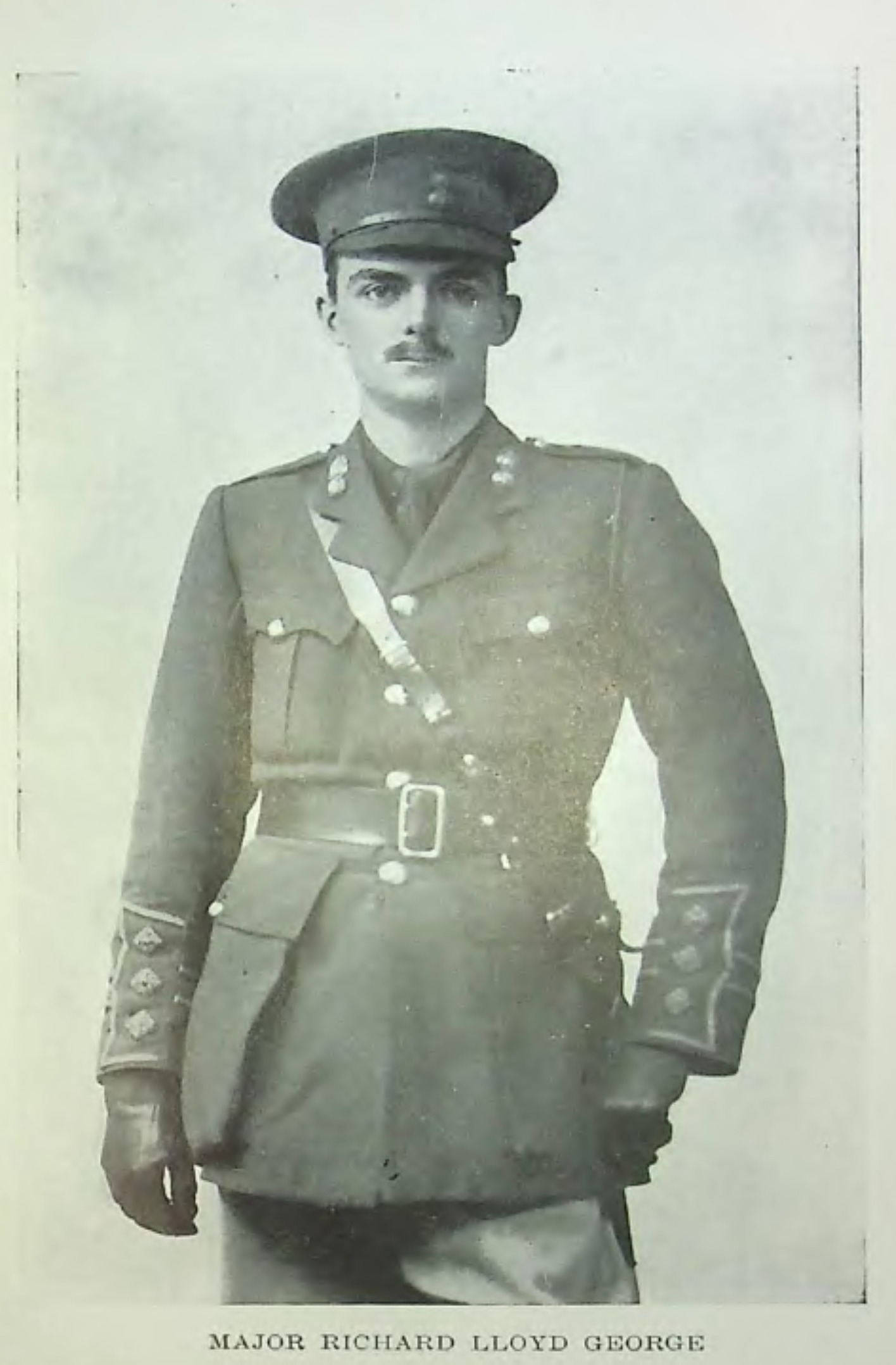

Member of the House of Lords Lord Temporal
- In office 13 June 1945 – 1 May 1968; Hereditary Peerage
- Preceded by: The 1st Earl Lloyd-George of Dwyfor
- Succeeded by: The 3rd Earl Lloyd-George of Dwyfor

Personal details
- Born: 15 February 1889
- Died: 1 May 1968 (aged 79)
- Spouse: Roberta McAlpine (m. 1917; div. 1933)
- Children: Valerie Davidia; Owen Lloyd George, 3rd Earl Lloyd-George of Dwyfor
- Parents: David Lloyd George (father); Margaret Owen (mother)

Richard Lloyd George, 2nd Earl Lloyd-George of Dwyfor (15 February 1889 – 1 May 1968) was a British soldier and peer in the peerage of the United Kingdom, a member of the House of Lords from 1945 until his death.

The son of the Liberal prime minister David Lloyd George by his first wife, Margaret Owen, Lloyd George was educated at Portmadoc School and Christ's College, Cambridge, graduating with a BA in 1910. Early in the First World War he and his younger brother Gwilym were commissioned as Temporary Second lieutenants into the 6th (Caernarvonshire and Anglesey) Battalion, Royal Welch Fusiliers of the Territorial Force, soon transferring to the 15th (Service) Battalion, Royal Welsh Fusiliers (1st London Welsh) of 'Kitchener's Army'. Richard later transferred to the Royal Engineers and rose to the rank of Major. He became an associate member of the Institution of Civil Engineers and served in the British Army again during the Second World War.

On 7 April 1917 Lloyd George married Roberta McAlpine (1898–1966), a daughter of Sir Robert McAlpine, 1st Baronet. They had two children, Valerie Davidia (1918–2000) and Owen (1924–2010), before being divorced in 1933. Valerie married the academic and broadcasting executive, Sir Goronwy Daniel. In 1935 Lloyd George married his second wife, Winifred Emily Peedle, a daughter of Thomas W. Peedle.

On 1 January 1945, his father was created Earl Lloyd-George of Dwyfor, and he gained the courtesy title of Viscount Gwynedd. Less than three months later, on 26 March 1945, his father died of cancer and he inherited the peerage, becoming the first member of the family to sit in the House of Lords, his father having been too ill to do so.

He wrote a biography of his mother, Dame Margaret, and one of his father, Lloyd George, which was described by a contemporary reviewer as "a very insignificant book", notable only in that it was the first biography of David Lloyd George to detail his prolific womanising.

== Arms ==
Coat of arms of Richard Lloyd George, 2nd Earl Lloyd-George of Dwyfor
Crest A demi-dragon Gules holding between the claws a portcullis Sable. Escutcheon Azure over water barry wavy in base a bridge of one arch Proper, on a chief Argent a portcullis Sable between two daffodils stalked and leaved Proper. Supporters Dexter, a Dragon Or, Sinister, an Eagle, wings addorsed Or, each gorged with a Collar Vert. Motto Y gwir yn erbyn y byd (The truth against the world).

== Works ==
- Lloyd George, Richard (1947). Dame Margaret: The Life Story of His Mother. London: George Allen & Unwin Ltd.
- Lloyd George, Richard (1960). Lloyd George. London: Frederick Muller Limited.

== Notes ==
Peerage of the United Kingdom
Preceded by David Lloyd George	Earl Lloyd-George of Dwyfor; 1945–1968	Succeeded by Owen Lloyd George
