= Viscount Tenby =

Viscountcy in the Peerage of the United Kingdom

- Creation date: 12 February 1957
- Created by: Elizabeth II
- Peerage: United Kingdom
- First holder: Gwilym Lloyd George, 1st Viscount Tenby
- Present holder: Timothy Henry Gwilym Lloyd George, 4th Viscount Tenby
- Remainder to: the 1st Viscount's heirs male

Viscount Tenby, of Bulford in the County of Pembroke, is a hereditary title in the Peerage of the United Kingdom, created in 1957 for former Home Secretary, the Hon. Gwilym Lloyd George, second son of Prime Minister David Lloyd George, 1st Earl Lloyd-George of Dwyfor (see Earl Lloyd-George of Dwyfor for earlier history of the family).

As of 2023 the title was held by his grandson, the fourth Viscount, who succeeded his father in 2023. His father Lord Tenby was one of the ninety elected hereditary peers to remain in the House of Lords after the House of Lords Act 1999, sitting as a crossbencher until he stood down from parliament in 2014 (being replaced by the Lord Mountevans).

As a great-grandson of the first Earl Lloyd-George of Dwyfor, he is also in remainder to this peerage and its subsidiary titles.

== Viscounts Tenby (1957) ==
- Gwilym Lloyd George, 1st Viscount Tenby (1894–1967)
- David Lloyd George, 2nd Viscount Tenby (1922–1983)
- William Lloyd George, 3rd Viscount Tenby (1927–2023)
- Timothy Henry Gwilym Lloyd George, 4th Viscount Tenby (born 1962)

There is no heir to the viscountcy.

== Arms ==
Coat of arms of Lloyd George, Viscounts Tenby
Crest "A demi-dragon Gules holding between the claws a portcullis Sable." Escutcheon "Azure over water barry wavy in base a bridge of one arch Proper, on a chief Argent a portcullis Sable between two daffodils stalked and leaved Proper." Supporters "Dexter, a dragon Gules, Sinister a lion Or; each gorged with a collar compony Argent and Vert, pendent from that of the dexter an escutcheon Argent charged with a martlet Sable, and from that of the sinister an escutcheon Gules charged with a port between two towers Argent." Motto Y gwir yn erbyn y byd (The truth against the world).

== See also ==
- Earl Lloyd-George of Dwyfor
