= Emlyn =

Welsh medieval cantref

Coordinates: 52.033°N 4.435°W

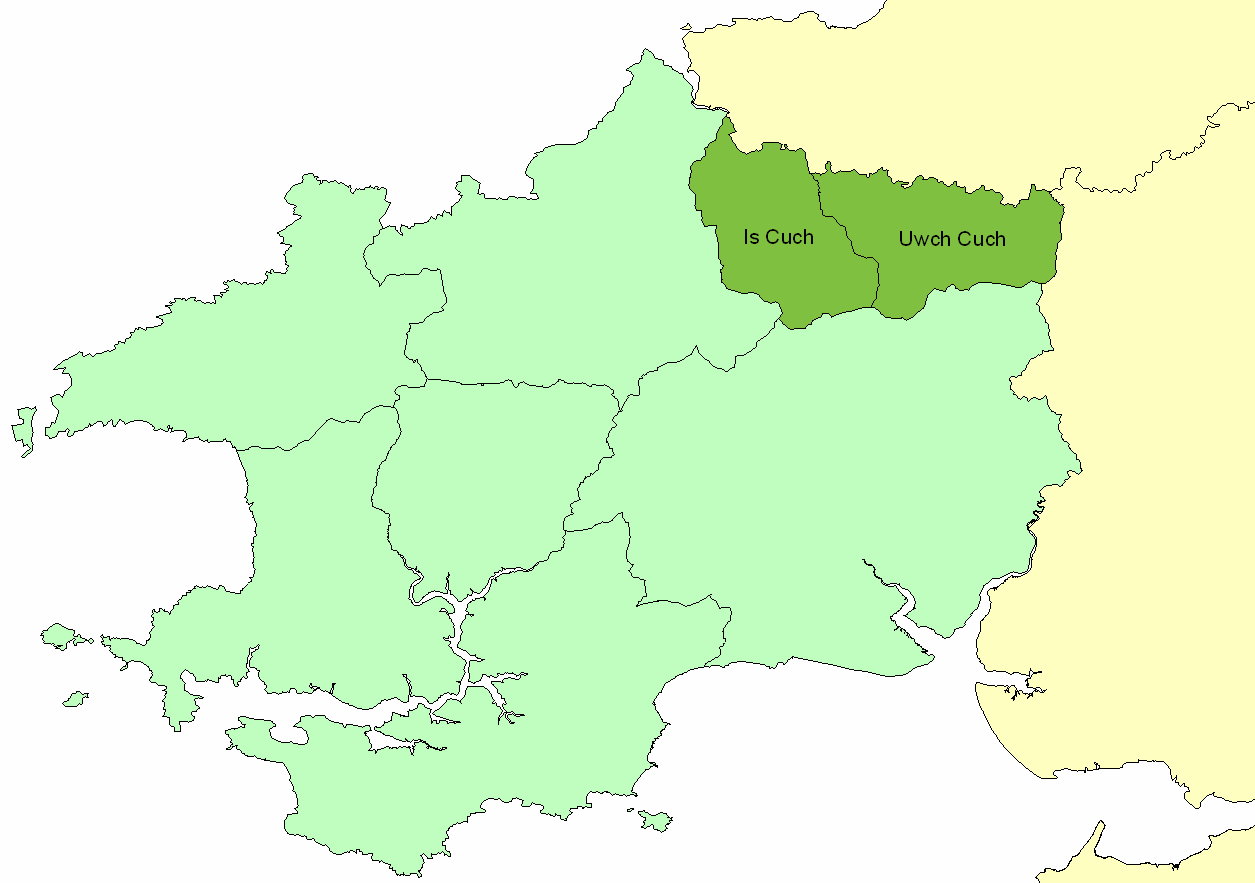
Location of the cantref of Emlyn within ancient Dyfed

Emlyn was one of the seven cantrefi of Dyfed, an ancient district of Wales, which became part of Deheubarth in around 950. It consisted of the northern part of Dyfed bordering on the River Teifi. Its southern boundary followed the ridge of the line of hills separating the Teifi valley from the valleys of the Tâf and Tywi.

== Geography ==
The name derives from am (around, on both sides of) and glyn (valley), the valley in question being presumably the Cuch. The Cuch valley is the most prominent valley among the low foothills which lie between the Preseli Hills and Cambrian Mountains, and Emlyn is essentially the region north of, and within, the gap between these landforms. As such, it was the first part of Dyfed to face invaders from Ceredigion.

Its area was about 84 square miles (220 km^{2}). It was divided by the River Cuch into the commotes of Emlyn Is Cuch (to the west) and Emlyn Uwch Cuch to the east. Its civil headquarters were divided between Cilgerran in the lower commote and Newcastle Emlyn in the upper. Its ecclesiastical centre (and perhaps, in the Age of the Saints, the seat of a bishop) was the church of St Llawddog at Cenarth.

== History ==
=== Arnulf ===
Following the Norman Conquest of England, the ruler of Deheubarth, Rhys ap Tewdwr, accepted the suzerainty of the English king, William the Conqueror, but when William died, Rhys, taking the view that his vassalage was for William's life only, attacked Worcester (in alliance with other magnates). Rhys was subsequently killed in battle at Brecon, in 1093, and his land (in theory forfeit for rebelling against Norman suzerainty) was almost immediately seized by various Norman magnates.

Sweeping south from Ceredigion, Arnulf de Montgomery took the lands between the Preseli Hills and Cambrian Mountains - Emlyn - and, passing south through them, conquered western Dyfed beyond it, establishing the Marcher Lordship of Pembroke in its place. With lands elsewhere, Arnulf appointed Gerald of Windsor as castellan; in about 1100, this castellan constructed Cilgerran Castle, to counter challenges from Ceredigion, and control the cantref of Emlyn. That same year, the king—William Rufus—died.

The following year, Arnulf took part in an unsuccessful rebellion (led by his elder brother) against William's successor, Henry I, in aid of Robert Curthose's claim to the throne. As a rebel against Henry's suzerainty, his lands were forfeit. The king kept the lands for himself, but unlike other areas of the Lordship of Pembroke, there was never a large scale settlement of Flemings in Emlyn; it remained mostly Welsh speaking, as it continues today.

=== Clare ===
When The Anarchy broke out upon Henry's death, one of the rival claimants to the throne—Stephen—in need of allies, gave the Marcher Lordship to Gilbert de Clare (a magnate with interests nearby), and to it attached the title Earl of Pembroke. The Anarchy also provided an opportunity for Rhys ap Tewdwr's son, Gruffydd, and his sons to raise an army and begin to reconstruct Deheubarth; starting with Ceredigion, by the 1150s they had reached as far south as Carmarthen. Though Stephen's successor, Henry II launched a successful counter-attack, the situation was reversed by an uprising a few years later; Cilgerran Castle fell to Gruffydd's son, Rhys ap Gruffydd, in 1166.

By now, Gilbert de Clare's son, Richard, had inherited the Lordship of Pembroke, now reduced to just Roose and Penfro. He had also inherited the Kingdom of Laigin (in jure uxoris, at least according to English inheritance law); King Henry, concerned about the possibility of a Norman kingdom in Ireland not ruled by him, made peace with Rhys, appointing him Justiciar of all Deheubarth.

=== Marshall ===
However, when Rhys died, a violent succession dispute broke out between his eldest son and his eldest legitimate son, leading to the former attacking Cilgerran, and capturing it from the latter. Eventually the dispute completely fractured their authority, and Richard de Clare's son-in-law, William Marshal was able to recover the Lordship of Pembroke entirely, his power reaching Cilgerran in 1204.

Meanwhile, Llywelyn Fawr, prince of Gwynedd took the opportunity to establish his hegemony over the Welsh princes. King Henry III was not in a position to resist this, owing to troubles with his barons, and his own young age, until a stroke paralysed Llywelyn in 1237, and the birth of Henry's son Edward two years later put the King in a much stronger political position with the nobility. In 1240, Henry managed to get Welsh princes to agree to the Treaty of Gloucester, and Llywelyn Fawr died shortly thereafter. That same year, in accordance with the provisions of the Treaty, the princes of Deheubarth surrendered the lands they held, and were re-granted them as honours; the king kept the Marcher Lordship of the land, while the princes became mere barons.

King Henry also ordered Gilbert, William Marshal's son and successor, to hand over "a reasonable portion" of his lands to the king so that one of Rhys's grandsons, Maredudd ap Rhys Gryg, could be enfeoffed with it; Maredudd and Gilbert's mothers were distant relations, and before Maredudd had reached adulthood, he had been Gilbert's ward. To satisfy the king's demand, Gilbert gave Maredudd the section of Emlyn east of the Cuch - Emlyn Uwch Cych (English: Emlyn beyond the Cuch). Early the following year, in a marriage that had probably been pre-arranged, Maredudd married Isobel, the illegitimate daughter of Gilbert's elder (but now deceased) brother, William; he had effectively acquired Emlyn Uwch Cych as a dowry. Maredudd built a castle to control his part of Emlyn: Newcastle Emlyn.

=== The introduction of counties ===
In 1282, the Statute of Rhuddlan converted the king's lands into counties, with those enfeoffed to Maredudd (including Emlyn Uwch Cych) becoming the main part of Carmarthenshire. Carmarthenshire was administratively subdivided into a number of hundreds, with Emlyn Uwch Cych falling within Elvet Hundred. Maredudd's son, Rhys ap Maredudd had by now inherited Maredudd's baronies, which continued to exist—though now within Carmarthenshire—until Rhys committed treason in 1287, attempting a rebellion.

The part of Emlyn west of the Cuch—Emlyn Is Cych (English: Emlyn on this side of the Cuch)—remained part of the Marcher Lordship of Pembroke, which continued to be held by William Marshall's descendants until 1389, when the then Marcher Lord died without direct or male-line heirs; as a result, the territory defaulted to the crown. Decades later, the Marcher Lordship of Pembroke was transferred to a royal favourite, who then likewise died without legitimate children, causing it to revert once more to the crown, a pattern that would repeat itself throughout the 15th century; among others it was held by Duke Humphrey (of Gloucester), William de la Pole and Jasper Tudor.

The last gifting of the Marcher Lordship of Pembroke, now attached to the title of Marquess, was from King Henry VIII to Anne Boleyn (shortly before he married her); later, at around the time she was on trial for treason, the king passed the first Laws in Wales Act in 1535, which abolished the status of Marcher Lords, and converted the Marcher Lordship of Pembroke, together with Dewisland, into Pembrokeshire. Emlyn Is Cych became Pembrokeshire's Cilgerran Hundred.

Emlyn's name lives on in several local place names, including Newcastle Emlyn.
