= Castellan, Pembrokeshire =

Former parish in Pembrokeshire, Wales

Coordinates: 52.002°N 4.637°W

Castellan
- Location within Pembrokeshire
- Community: Boncath
- Principal area: Pembrokeshire
- Country: Wales
- Sovereign state: United Kingdom
- Post town: Boncath
- Postcode district: SA37
- Dialling code: 01239
- Police: Dyfed-Powys
- Fire: Mid and West Wales
- Ambulance: Welsh
- UK Parliament: Preseli Pembrokeshire
- Senedd Cymru – Welsh Parliament: Preseli Pembrokeshire

Castellan is an ancient hamlet and, until 1974, was a parish in the Hundred of Kilgerran, Pembrokeshire, Wales. It is situated in the north of the county on the slopes of Frenni Fawr, one mile (2 km) north of Crymych and included much of the village of Blaenffos.

== Origin of the name ==
The placename is an archaic Welsh word meaning "little castle".

== History ==
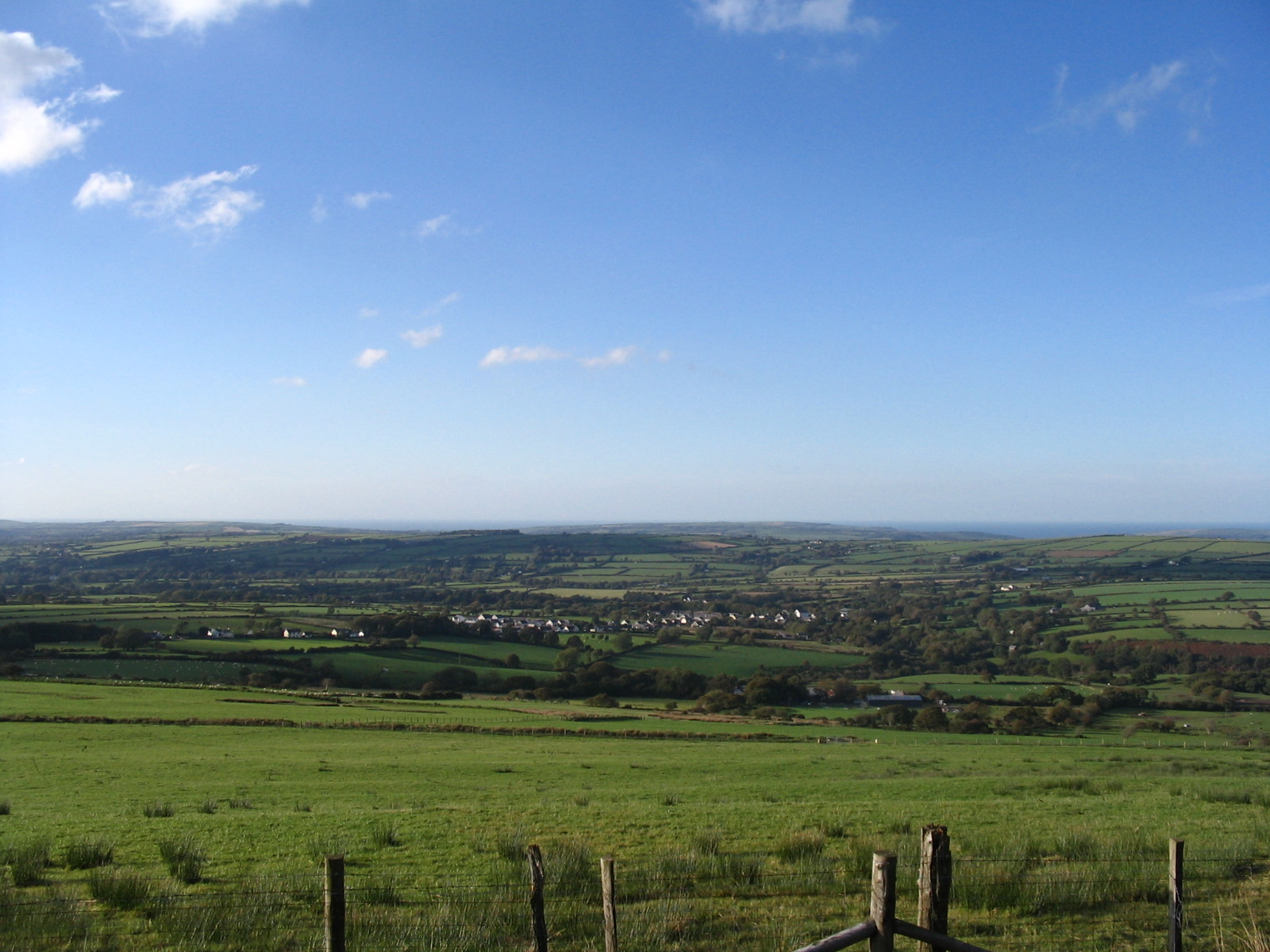
View across Castellan and Blaenffos (Castellan Farm is in the right foreground)

The parish had an area of 920 acres (370 ha). It was originally a chapelry of the parish of Penrydd (several alternate spellings), granted by William Marshal, Earl of Pembroke, to the Knights Hospitallers of Slebech c.1130 and was returned in the Valor Ecclesiasticus (1291) as paying 13s 4d (two-thirds of a pound) per annum. Castellan (as Cap. Kestellan) appears on a 1578 parish map of Pembrokeshire. In 1684 the rector and churchwardens of Penrith (sic) and Castellan declared the chapel to be "out of repair", the bier having been stolen some 28 years previously. It was annexed to Penrhudd Parish soon after the dissolution of the monasteries but was abandoned by c.1700 and in ruins by 1833. The church is no longer marked on Ordnance Survey maps.

The 1831 census lists the chapelry as having 26 families in as many homes with no uninhabited buildings; 17 of the families were chiefly involved in agriculture and 7 in trades, crafts or manufacture.

Tithe apportionment (1837) and map (1844) are held at the National Archives.

Prior to 1850 the parish included Blaenffos, Clover Hill, Frenni Fawr, Gorsfaith and Moelfryn with a population of 127 in 1833; earlier censuses included Castellan with Penrith and formed an extensive part of the parish of Penrith (sic). In 1833 (despite the chapel being in ruins) the incumbent received one guinea annually from Sir R.B.P. Philipps of Picton Castle.

In 1881 more than half of men still worked in agriculture with the remainder in trades; while a few women were in domestic service or trade, the majority are listed as "unknown occupation", presumably housewives. The 1881 census records David Nicholas aged 37 as farming 57 acres, having been born in Castellan; Nicholas was the father of Thomas Evan Nicholas.

By 1901 there were more than 40 houses in the parish, dipping to 37 in 1931 but rising to 46 in 1961.

The site of the chapel, described in the Inventory (visited 1915) as "a building 26 feet by 17 feet. A fragment of walling about 5 feet in height marks the east end of the little church.", is still visible.

The northern part of the parish is now in the community of Boncath, and the southern part is in Crymych community. The name of the parish survives in Castellan Farm, near the site of the chapel which, according to Geograph, is no longer accessible.

== Demography ==
Castellan's census population was estimated (being counted with Penrydd parish) as 82 in 1801 and 105 in 1811. Subsequently the population grew to a maximum of about 170 in the mid-19th century, to a minimum of 115 in 1951, and thereafter grew to 162 by 1981.
