= Blaenffos =

Village in Pembrokeshire, Wales

Coordinates: 52.002°N 4.637°W

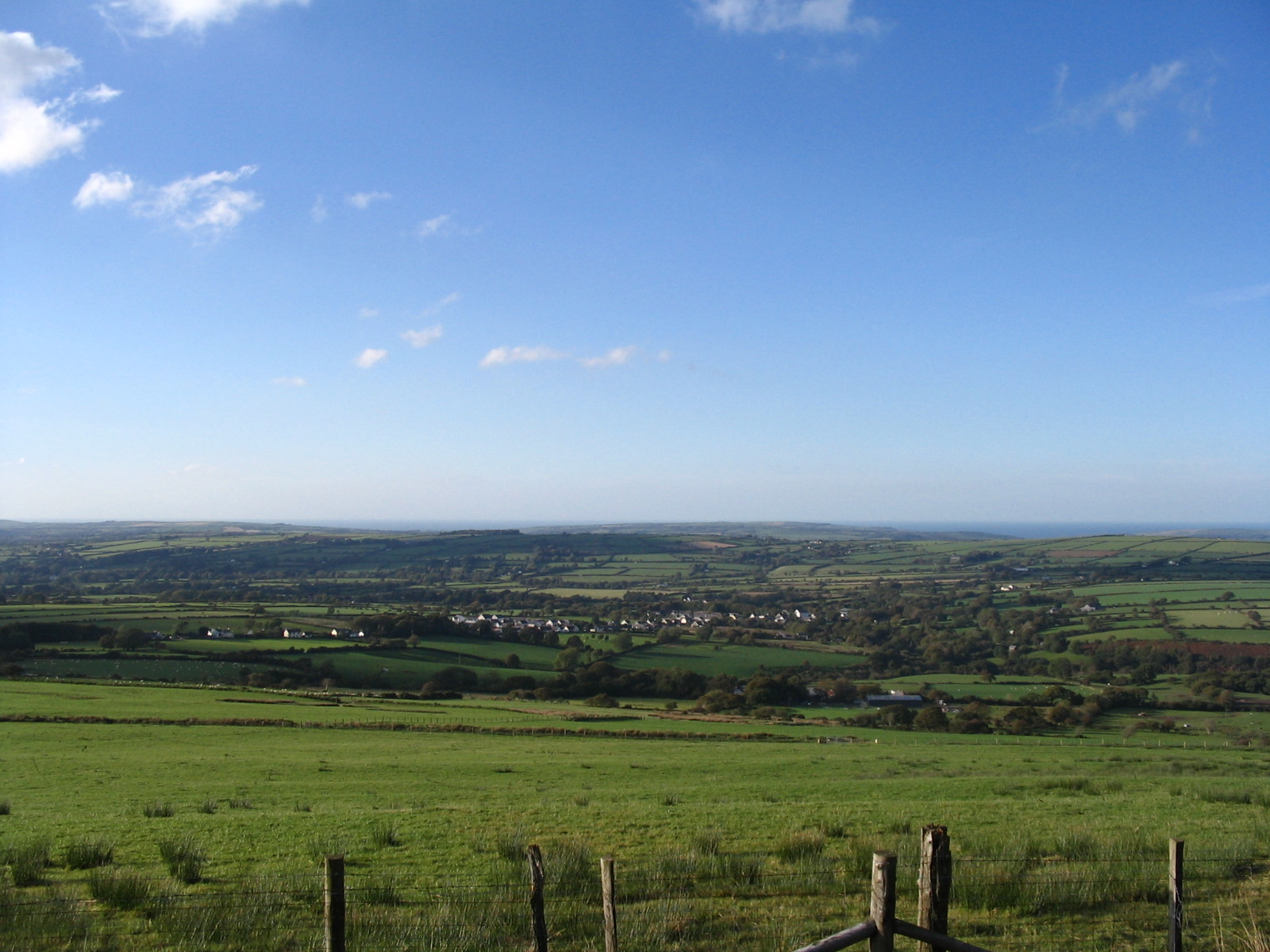
- Blaenffos viewed from the southeast

- Location within Pembrokeshire
- OS grid reference: SN190371
- Community: Boncath
- Principal area: Pembrokeshire
- Country: Wales
- Sovereign state: United Kingdom
- Post town: Boncath
- Postcode district: SA37
- Dialling code: 01239
- Police: Dyfed-Powys
- Fire: Mid and West Wales
- Ambulance: Welsh
- UK Parliament: Preseli Pembrokeshire
- Senedd Cymru – Welsh Parliament: Preseli Pembrokeshire

Blaenffos is a small village of around 200 inhabitants in the north of Pembrokeshire, Wales, in the community of Boncath. It sits on the boundary between the former parishes of Llanfihangel Penbedw and Castellan Chapelry (part of Penrydd parish).

Lying one mile to the north of Crymych, Blaenffos has an average elevation of 200 metres (660 ft), lying on the western slopes of Y Frenni which at 395 metres (1,296 ft) is the most easterly peak in the Preseli Hills. The village straddles the A478 former drovers' road which runs from Cardigan in Ceredigion south to Tenby, is surrounded by farmland, and is in the heart of Welsh-speaking Pembrokeshire with a rich history and associated folklore.

== Origin of name ==
According to Thomas Morgan (1912), Blaenffos takes its name "from a farmhouse so called, signifying the head of the ditch" (Welsh: blaen ffôs). A farm bearing this name still exists to the west of the village.

== History, tradition and folklore ==
Local evidence indicates that the area that is now Blaenffos would have been farmed at least as far back as the Bronze Age over 3,000 years ago, and possibly earlier. Bronze Age barrows are still visible on nearby Frenni Fawr. Richard Fenton, who visited Frenni Fawr in the early 19th century to excavate the barrows recorded the tradition of a treasure-chest hidden on the hill, guarded by a horrible spectre. It was said that the spectre would rise and protect the treasure if any attempt was made to remove it.

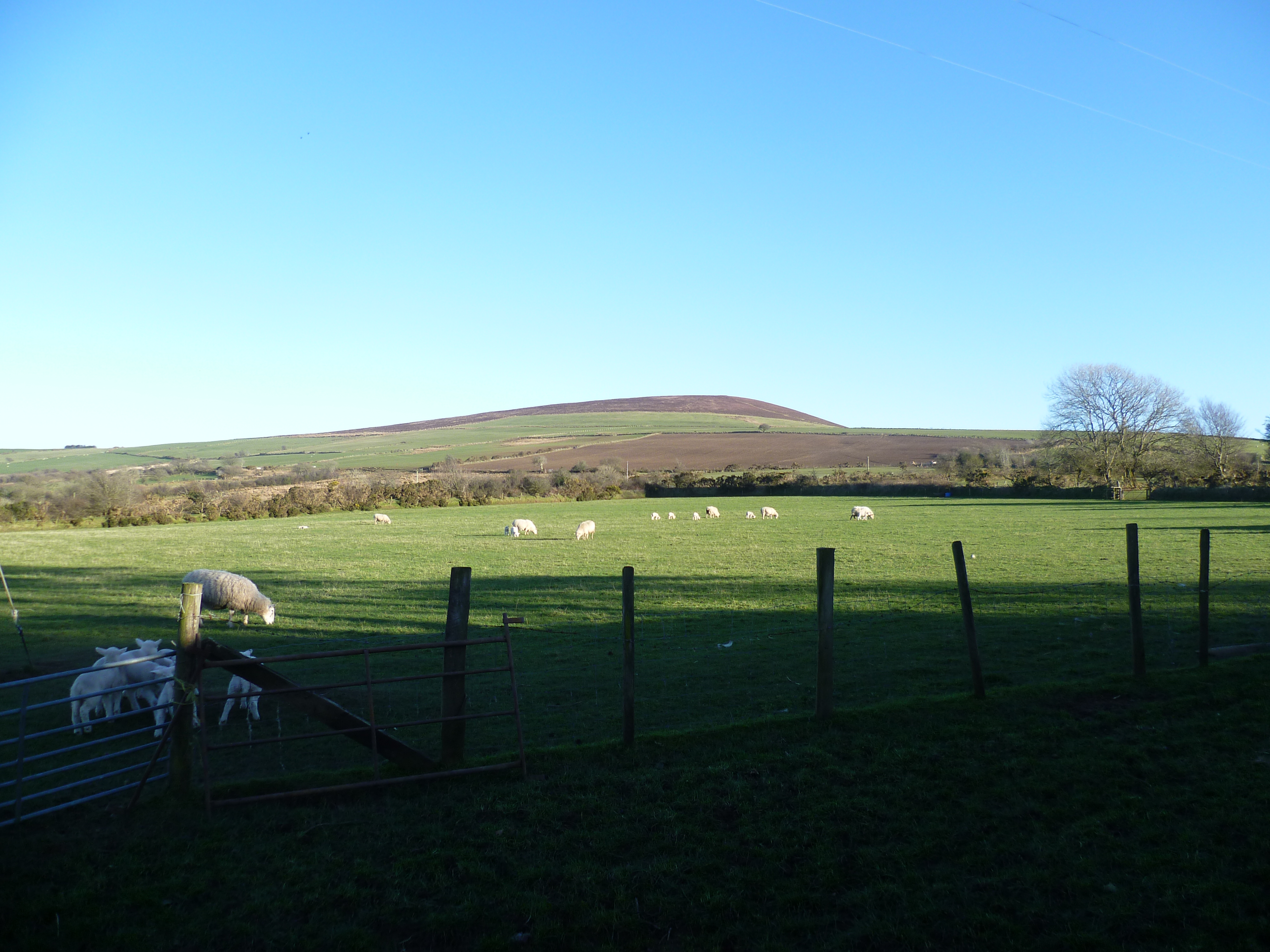
View of Frenni Fawr from Clover Hill

The Roman Empire reached West Wales in about 70 AD, though no Roman archaeology is known to exist in the village. Pembrokeshire Local Action Network for Enterprise and Development (PLANED) quotes: In the Mabinogi tale "Breuddwyd Macsen" (The Dream of Maxen), the Roman Emperor Magnus Maximus is said to have made camp on the Frenni Fawr. The hill was apparently known locally as Cadair Macsen until relatively recent times. The remains of a heavily fortified Roman auxiliary fort was discovered in 2024 in the area.

PLANED also quotes the myth that: The Tylwyth Teg or Fairy Folk were believed to frequent the Frenni Fawr in the past. There is a local tale of a shepherd boy who was taken by them to their own country, where he was allowed to stay providing that he did not drink from a particular well. Curiosity eventually got the better of him and upon drinking the water he found himself back on the slopes of the Frenni Fawr.

Christianity grew in the area from about the 5th century. The boundary between the former parishes of Llanfihangel Penbedw and Castellan Chapelry (part of Penrydd) runs through the old centre of the village at the bottom of the hill. From the 17th century, land began to be enclosed and road networks, including the Tenby-Cardigan turnpike running through the village, were improved in the 18th century.

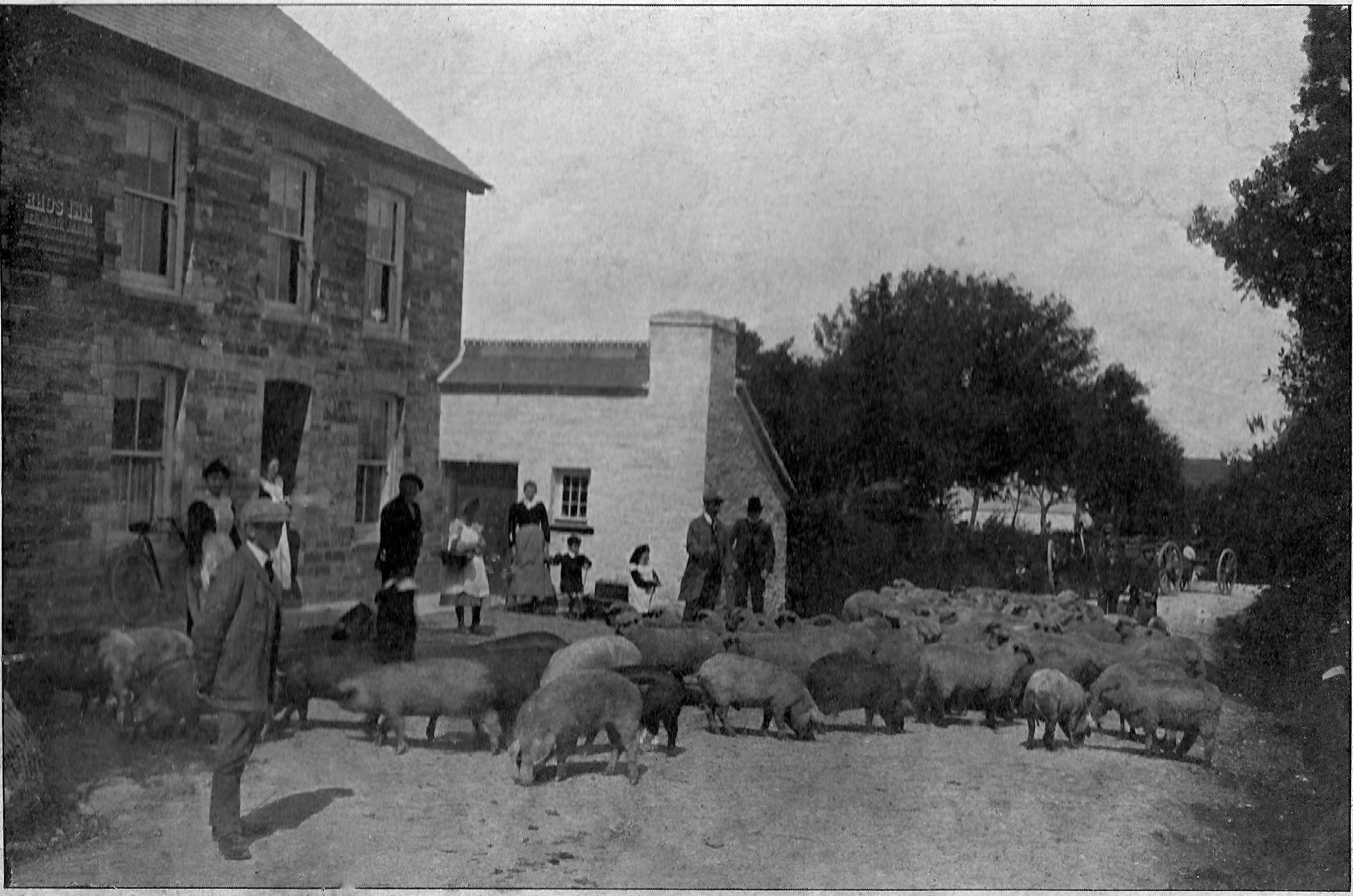
Livestock on the road outside Rhôs Inn, c.1900

The road running through Blaenffos formed part of a drovers' road moving local and Irish livestock as far away as England, a practice driven by demand for centuries. To service this industry it is rumoured that there were at one time five public houses in the village but by 1900 only three remained: The Rhôs Inn (run in 1911 by Benjamin James, a grocer and dealer), New House and New Inn. New House was closed in 1914 under the Defence of the Realm Act, with compensation of £400 paid and New Inn existed at least until 1918; these three pubs subsequently became private dwellings.

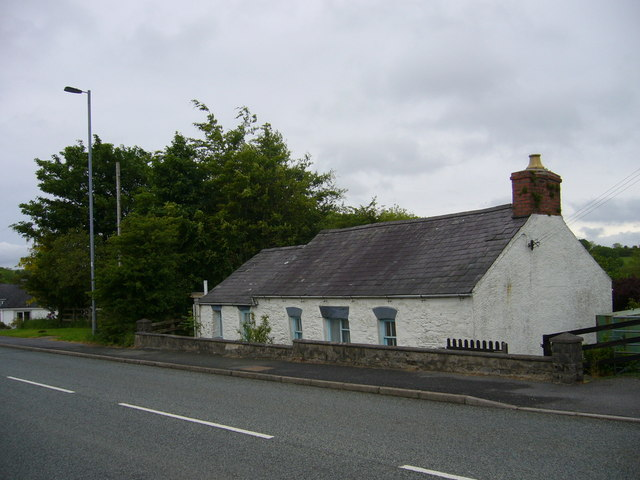
Hafod, an early cottage

As well as the Baptist Chapel (see below) two post-mediaeval buildings in Blaenffos were noted by the 2008 Royal Commission on the Ancient and Historical Monuments of Wales - Hafod, a two-roomed stone cottage standing by the main road and Rafel, a substantial house with a (modern) plaque stating "1784". Rafel was listed Grade II by Cadw in 1987. Another Grade II listed building is Llain-ddu, an early 19th century single-storey cottage to the east of the village.

Blaenffos was recorded on an early 20th-century Ordnance Survey map as Blaen-ffôs but was inhabited at least as early as 1785 when the Baptist Chapel was built. At least 10 properties are marked on the Ordnance Survey's first series of maps (1805), one building being annotated Blaenyffoes-isa (English: Lower Blaenffos) in approximately the position of what was later called New House, though Blaenffos is not named as a village.

Distinctive among the almost exclusively Welsh names in the village is Clover Hill where the main road climbs southwards out of the village. The name existed as early as the 1850s but the origin of this English name is unknown. It may refer to a quarry (cloddfa); there were small examples in the vicinity. It does not appear on the first Ordnance Survey of 1805. In 1889 the "compact and valuable" Clover Hill Farm, comprising house, shop, outbuildings and 13 acres, 3 roods, 19 poles of land (5.6 hectares) was sold at auction for £515.

Blaenffos was relatively remote even towards the end of the 19th century: resident Dan Evans froze to death after losing his way in the snow trying to get home after dark in January 1887.

The Whitland and Cardigan Railway, nicknamed Cardi Bach (Little Cardi), passed through the village between the stations at Crymych and Boncath; this part of the line was laid in 1886. In February 1886 the press reported that Mr Samuel, Railway Cashier at Boncath, had given the children of Blaenffos School (see Education, below) a magic lantern entertainment. Boncath railway station did not open until September that year. The line was closed in 1963 and the track lifted by the end of 1964. The remains of the cuttings can still be seen, but there was no halt at Blaenffos.

People of Blaenffos did not escape the First World War; a regional newspaper carried an advertisement and photograph placed by a mother appealing for news of her son who was missing while serving with the Welsh Regiment. He had died six months earlier at the Battle of Gaza and his name appears with those of other local servicemen on the Crymych War Memorial.

There was a Blaenffos branch of the Cardigan and District temperance movement; the Pembrokeshire Records Office holds the singing festival minute book of 1925-1969 (document reference number HDX/1729). A temperance meeting on Y Frenni in 1875 was attended by an estimated 2,000 people.

With the conversion of civil parishes to communities in 1974, Blaenffos became part of the community of Boncath. The village saw a building boom in the 21st century from the old centre southwards along the main road on Clover Hill.

== Religion ==
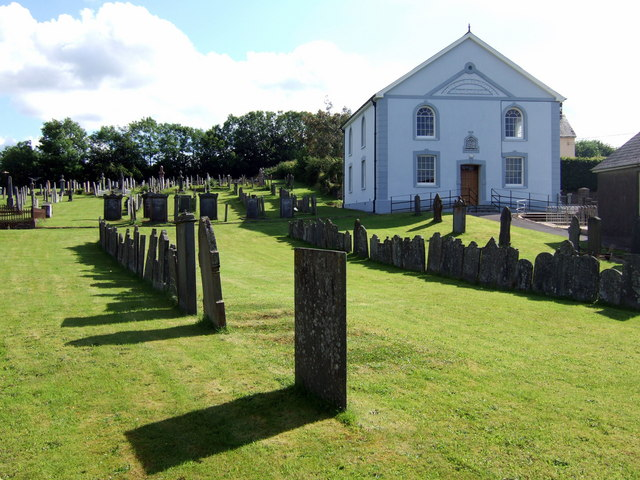
Blaenffos Chapel and graveyard

Blaenffos Baptist Chapel (Capel y Bedyddwyr Blaenffos) in the ancient chapelry of Castellan in Penrhydd (also spelled Penrith, Penrieth, Pen-Rydd and Penrhudd) parish in the Hundred of Kilgerran was originally built in 1765 or 1785. The noted preacher Christmas Evans recorded that 20 people had been baptised in 1791. The chapel was renovated and rebuilt in 1807.

In 1831 a petition for the abolition of slavery was presented to the House of Lords signed by ministers and members of the congregation of the chapel in common with hundreds of other nonconformist bodies throughout Great Britain, helping to pave the way to the Abolition of Slavery Act two years later.

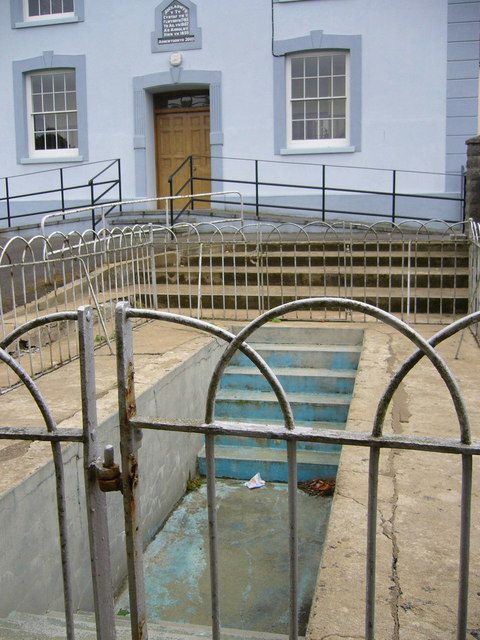
Baptismal pool

In 1851 the Religious Census listed the minister as James David Thomas. The present chapel dates from 1855. In 1917 the Reverend Aaron Morgan celebrated 25 years as pastor of the chapel.

The chapel was Grade II listed by Cadw (ID:15382) in 1995 and was completely renovated in 2005, retaining the original outdoor baptismal pool.

== Education ==
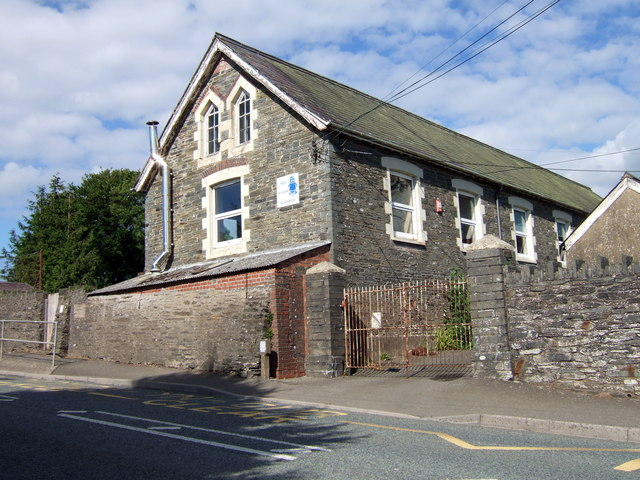
The former Blaenffos School

Bwrdd Ysgol Blaenffos (English: Blaenffos Board School) opened in March 1879, an event attended by several hundred people. Before this, the school had been held in the vestry of the Baptist Chapel. The first headteacher was Mr W Hughes (tenure 1879-1913). After local education authorities were established under the Education Act 1902 the school became a county primary.

In 1935 Waldo Williams taught at the school for a week while the head teacher was away.

The school closed in 2004 and the 28 pupils transferred to Ysgol y Frenni Community Primary School in Crymych. The buildings were converted to domestic dwellings in 2012/13.

Lon Vaughan, a former pupil, has produced a bilingual book on the 125-year history of the school from the school's original records.

== Notable people ==
- William Roberts (1862-1912), local composer noted for Bryngogarth, is buried in the cemetery.
- Professor David Evans (1888-1968), academic and author, was born in Blaenffos and spent World War I in Ruhleben.
- James Arthur Davies OBE (1923-2007), ex-RAF and educationalist, lived in Blaenffos as a child.
- Paul Davies MS (born 1969), Member of the Welsh Parliament, lives in Blaenffos.
- Claire Jones (born 1985), former harpist to the Prince of Wales, grew up locally and was married in Blaenffos in 2012.

== Amenities ==
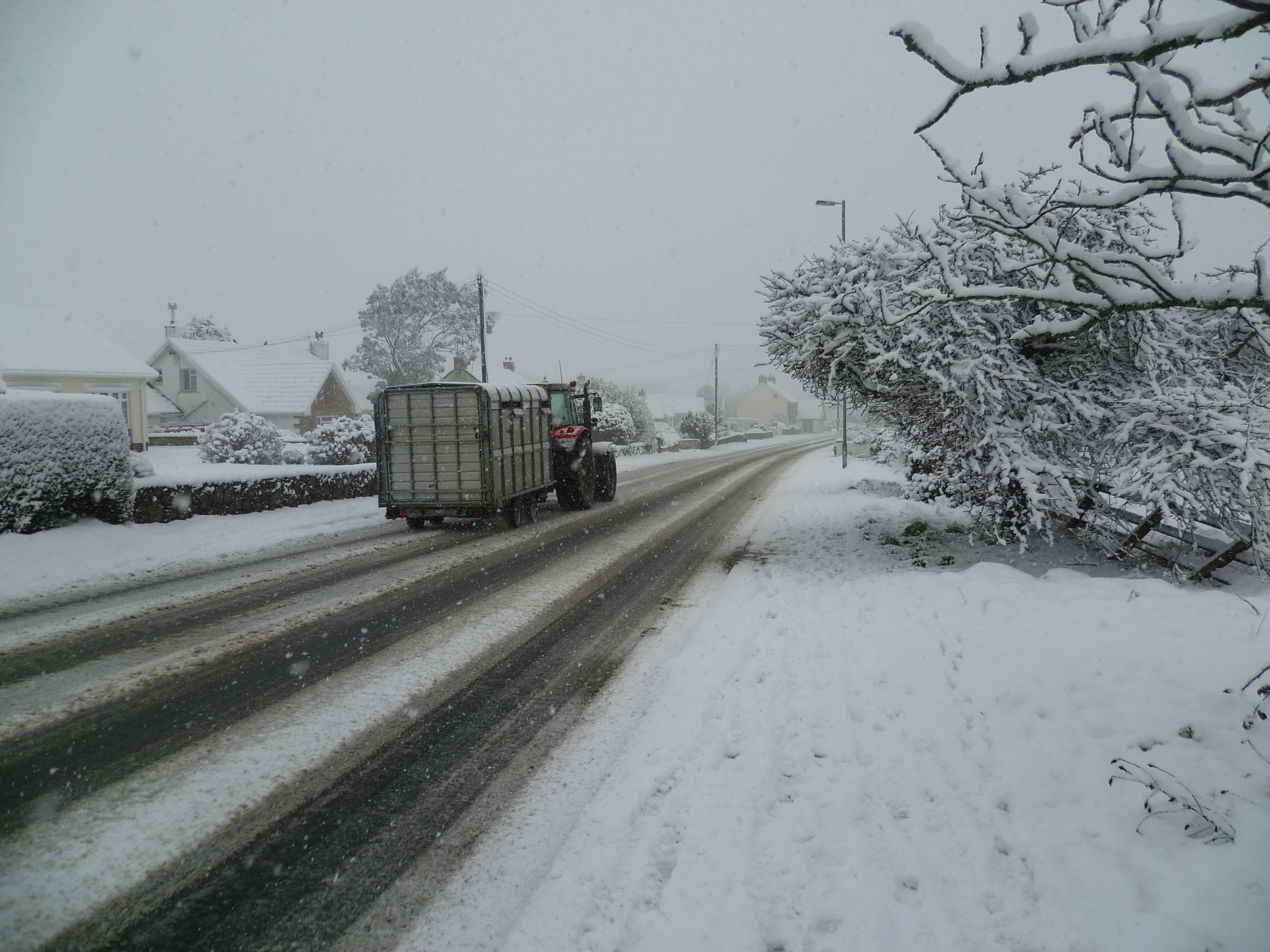
Blaenffos in January 2013

The village has a general store, which stands by the building that was the Rhôs Inn. There are various small businesses, including holiday lets, located in and around the village. Blaenffos is surrounded by farmland supporting sheep- and cattle-rearing.

=== Transport ===
The A478 road connecting Cardigan to the north with Tenby to the south runs through the village; from this road are lanes connecting with neighbouring villages. The Cardigan to Narberth Richards Bros. 430 bus service runs through the village.

== Demographics ==
Housing is a mixture of older brick or stone dwellings and newer timber-framed houses and bungalows.

=== Language ===
Blaenffos retains a strong Welsh identity with 64 per cent of the population being able to speak Welsh, compared with 19 per cent of the population of Wales as a whole. 68 per cent of Blaenffos's population were born in Wales, with 29 per cent having been born in England. 68 per cent of residents claimed some Welsh identity according to the 2011 census.

=== Governance ===
Administratively, Blaenffos falls within Llanfihangel Ward of Boncath Community.
