= Ffynone House =

Mansion and estate near Boncath, Pembrokeshire, Wales

Ffynone
- Ffynnonau
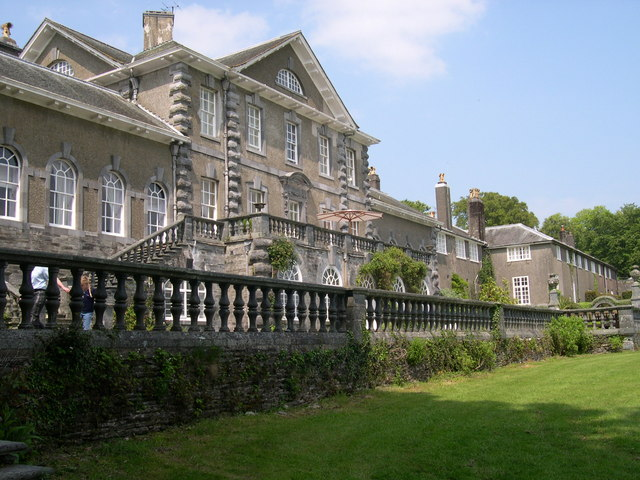
- Ffynone in 2004

- Location within Wales

General information
- Location: Manordeifi, Boncath, Wales
- Coordinates: 52°01′04″N 04°34′0″W
- Elevation: 120 m (390 ft)
- Completed: 1799

Design and construction
- Architect: John Nash

Ffynone (Welsh: Ffynnonau) is a mansion and estate near Boncath, Pembrokeshire, Wales, in the parish of Manordeifi. The original Georgian design was by the architect John Nash, and the house was later remodelled by Inigo Thomas. It is a Grade I listed building, and its gardens and park are also listed, at Grade I, on the Cadw/ICOMOS Register of Parks and Gardens of Special Historic Interest in Wales.

== History ==
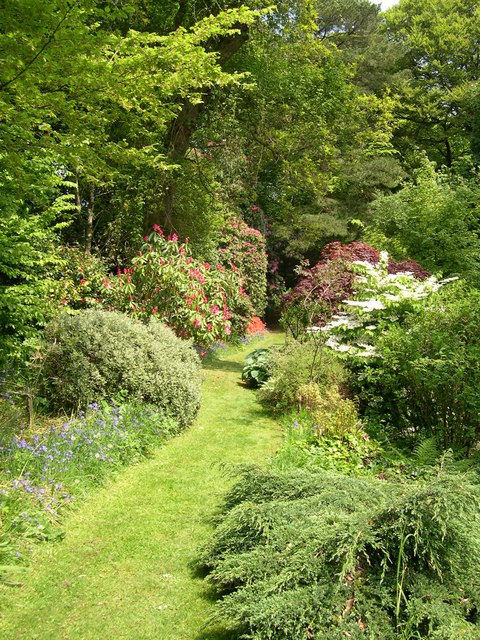
A view of part of the garden in 2004

The name predates the present house, and its Welsh name Ffynnonau, meaning "Wells", reflects the existence of a number of springs in the vicinity.

In 1752 Captain Stephen Colby bought the Ffynone estate from the Morgan family of Blaenbwlan. The house, completed in 1799, was repaired in 1828 by W. Hoare and Son of Lawrenny. In the 1830s, the estate extended to 237 acres in the Manordeifi parish, with further land in adjacent parishes. The parkland around the house was some thirty acres. There were many additions and improvements over the following years to both the house and the estate.

The property was passed down in the Colby family to John Vaughan Colby, whose wife in 1902 commissioned the architect and garden designer Inigo Thomas to remodel the house and lay out the terraced gardens, work which was completed in 1907.

John Vaughan Colby died in 1919. He had no son and left the estate to his daughter Aline Margaret, who had married Captain Cecil John Herbert Spence-Jones, son of the Dean of Gloucester, in 1908; the marriage was a notable occasion, reported in great detail, an occasion for local celebration, despite there being no guests at the wedding and no reception, owing to the bride's mother's state of health. Spence-Jones took the additional surname of Colby by royal licence in 1920. In 1927, the property was sold to a Glamorgan business man.

The house, in 20 acres (8.1 ha) of woodland, was bought and restored from 1988 onwards by Owen Lloyd George, 3rd Earl Lloyd-George of Dwyfor and his wife, who are credited with saving the house. After the death of the 3rd Earl in 2010, the house was put up for sale with a guide price of £2.5 million. The asking price for the house and 34 acres (14 ha) was reduced in July 2021 to £1.8 million and the property was subsequently sold for an undisclosed sum.

The estate records (to 1919) are held at the National Library of Wales.

== Architecture ==
John Nash was commissioned to design the house in the early 1790s; construction work began in 1794 and was completed by 1799. Materials included locally quarried stone as well as stone from other parts of Britain. The house was laid out to a classical Georgian plan. 60,000 trees were sourced from John Mackie, a Norwich nursery man, and hundreds of tons of topsoil were brought in. Inigo Thomas, in contrast, remodelled the house in the style of an Italian palazzo. He added the east and west wings, creating a library and an ornate dining room and music room with a cross vaulted tunnel roof.

=== Listing designations ===
In January 1952, the house was designated as a Grade I listed building. Other buildings on the wider estate were listed in November 1994. The service range, comprising stables and a kitchen court, is listed at Grade I. Other ancillary buildings are listed at Grade II including the game larder, and a large outbuilding. The entrance gates and gatepiers to the estate piers and the piers, steps and walls in the North Court are all listed at Grade II.

The gardens and parkland at Ffynone are designated Grade I on the Cadw/ICOMOS Register of Parks and Gardens of Special Historic Interest in Wales. Structures within the gardens with listings include: the terrace to the south of the house, together with its enclosing walls and balustrades, which are listed at Grade II*; and a sundial on the west lawn; the Western Terrace; a fountain; and a gazebo, all of which are listed Grade II.
