= Llanfihangel Penbedw =

Parish in Pembrokeshire, Wales

Coordinates: 52.024795°N 4.617692°W

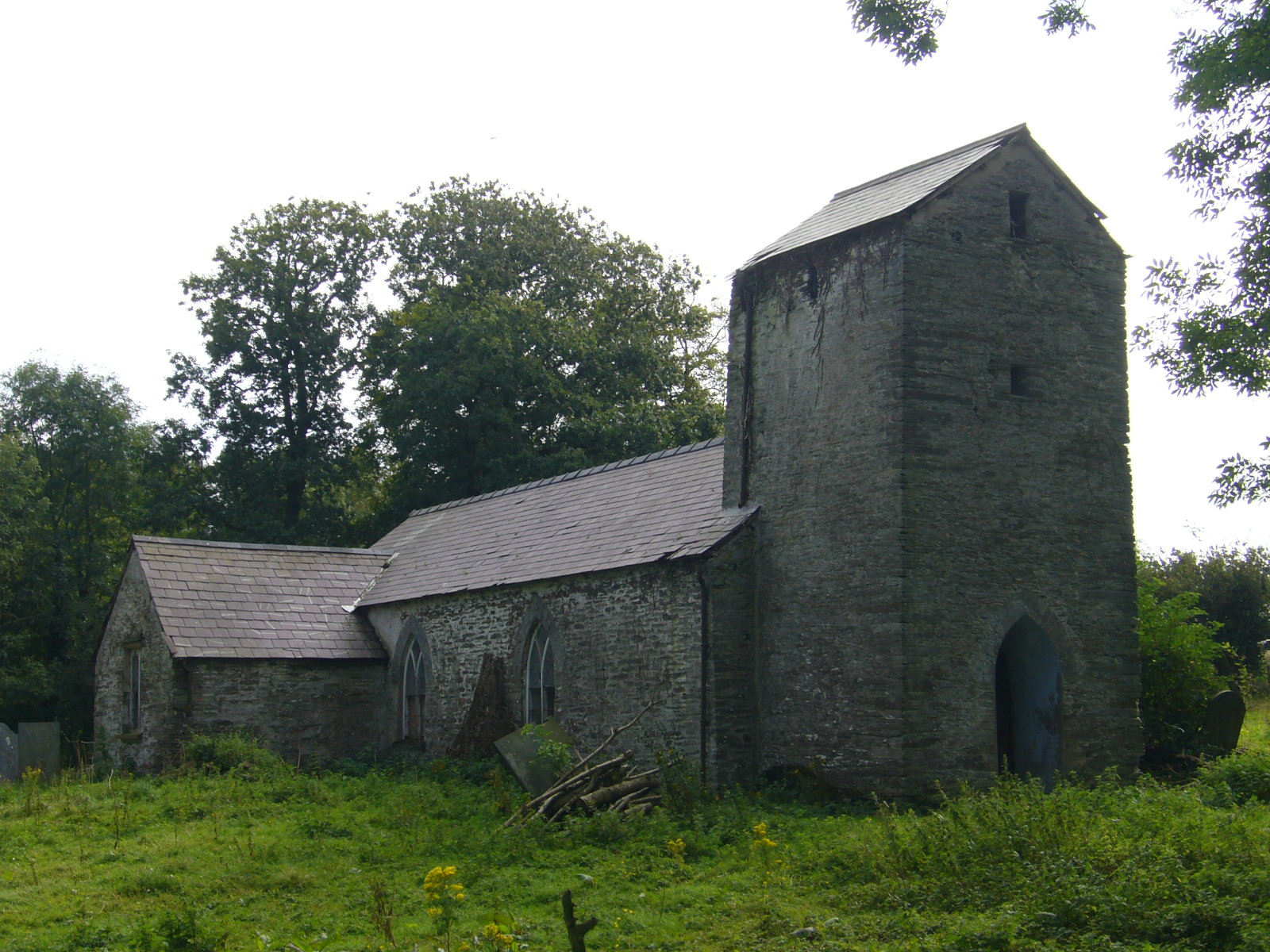
- St Michael's Church, 2007

- Location within Pembrokeshire
- OS grid reference: SN2039
- Community: Boncath
- Principal area: Pembrokeshire
- Country: Wales
- Sovereign state: United Kingdom
- Post town: Boncath
- Postcode district: SA
- Dialling code: 01239
- Police: Dyfed-Powys
- Fire: Mid and West Wales
- Ambulance: Welsh
- UK Parliament: Preseli Pembrokeshire
- Senedd Cymru – Welsh Parliament: Preseli Pembrokeshire

Llanfihangel Penbedw is a parish in the former Hundred of Kilgerran in northeast Pembrokeshire, Wales. The parish, a joint curacy with Capel Colman, in the Diocese of St Davids in the Church in Wales, included the village of Boncath and part of the village of Blaenffos. The parish church is abandoned and the civil parish has been absorbed into Boncath Community.

== Name ==
Llanfihangel refers to St Michael the Archangel, to whom the parish church is dedicated. Penbedw refers to a headland of birch trees, which relates to the similarly named Birkenhead on Merseyside. Penbedw has also been translated as birch-covered hill.

== History ==
The earliest recorded date of the parish is 1325, with the patronage before that date belonging to the Earl of Pembroke.

Llanfihangel Penbedw (as Llanyhangel Penbedu) appears on a 1578 parish map of Pembrokeshire. The living of the parish was presented to George Owen Harry (or Henry) in 1594 by George Owen, Lord of Cemais. Harry held the living until his death in 1614. Richard Fenton the Welsh topographer and poet in his 1811 work A Historical Tour through Pembrokeshire made liberal use of Harry's manuscripts.

Parish records exist from the 17th century to 1970, with the last recorded burial in 1916. The church was rebuilt on the old foundations in the 19th century.

Throughout the 19th century the population of the parish remained relatively constant at between 200 and 350. In 1833 the parish had 353 inhabitants and was under the patronage of the Crown with the 1,000 acres (400 ha) valued at £70 10s. Falling under Cardigan Union, the Poor Law Commissioners reported that an average of £88 was expended on the poor of the parish between 1834 and 1836. Tithe maps and archives of 1840 are held at the National Archives.

The land in the parish was described as "good Sporting Country and surrounded by well-preserved Estates" in a notice of 1869 where over 1,000 acres (400 ha) of arable, grass and woodland across five parishes was for sale freehold. The parish area was 2,410 acres (980 ha) in the 1870s and had a population of 287. In 1881 the majority of males in the parish were working in agriculture.

The perpetual curacy of Llanfihangel Penbedw and Capel Colman resulted in joint events; for example, the 1878 Harvest Thanksgiving Service was held at Capel Colman in the morning and at Llanfihangel Penbedw in the afternoon, with sermons and services in English and Welsh by clergy from several neighbouring parishes. All the clergy were invited to dinner by Mrs Lloyd of Kilrhue.

The final extension of the railway line from Whitland to Cardigan was completed in 1886, with a station at Boncath. The line passed within about 100 yards (91 m) of the church. The line was closed in 1962 and the track lifted.

In 1888 David Worthington was appointed to the curacy of Llanfihangel Penbedw and Capel Colman, replacing David Lewis.

In 1891 the parish, with twelve other neighbouring parishes, was the subject of an alert regarding possible difficulties in collecting tithe arrears totalling £500. While neither the bailiff nor the chief-constable of Pembrokeshire expected violence, in the opinion of some of the clergy the possibility could not be dismissed.

In 1897 Rev. Morris James Marsden BA was appointed.

By 1961 the number of houses (66) in the parish had fallen from 86 some 120 years earlier. The number of Welsh speakers fell to 75% in the last quarter of the 20th century. The church was abandoned during the same period and was described in 2004 as "miserably abandoned and overgrown"; the growth was cleared subsequently but the church remains in a poor state internally.

== Today ==
The name of the former civil parish continues in Llanfihangel Ward in Boncath Community.
