= Otley Hall =

Manor house in Suffolk, England

Coordinates: 52°09′37″N 1°13′31″E

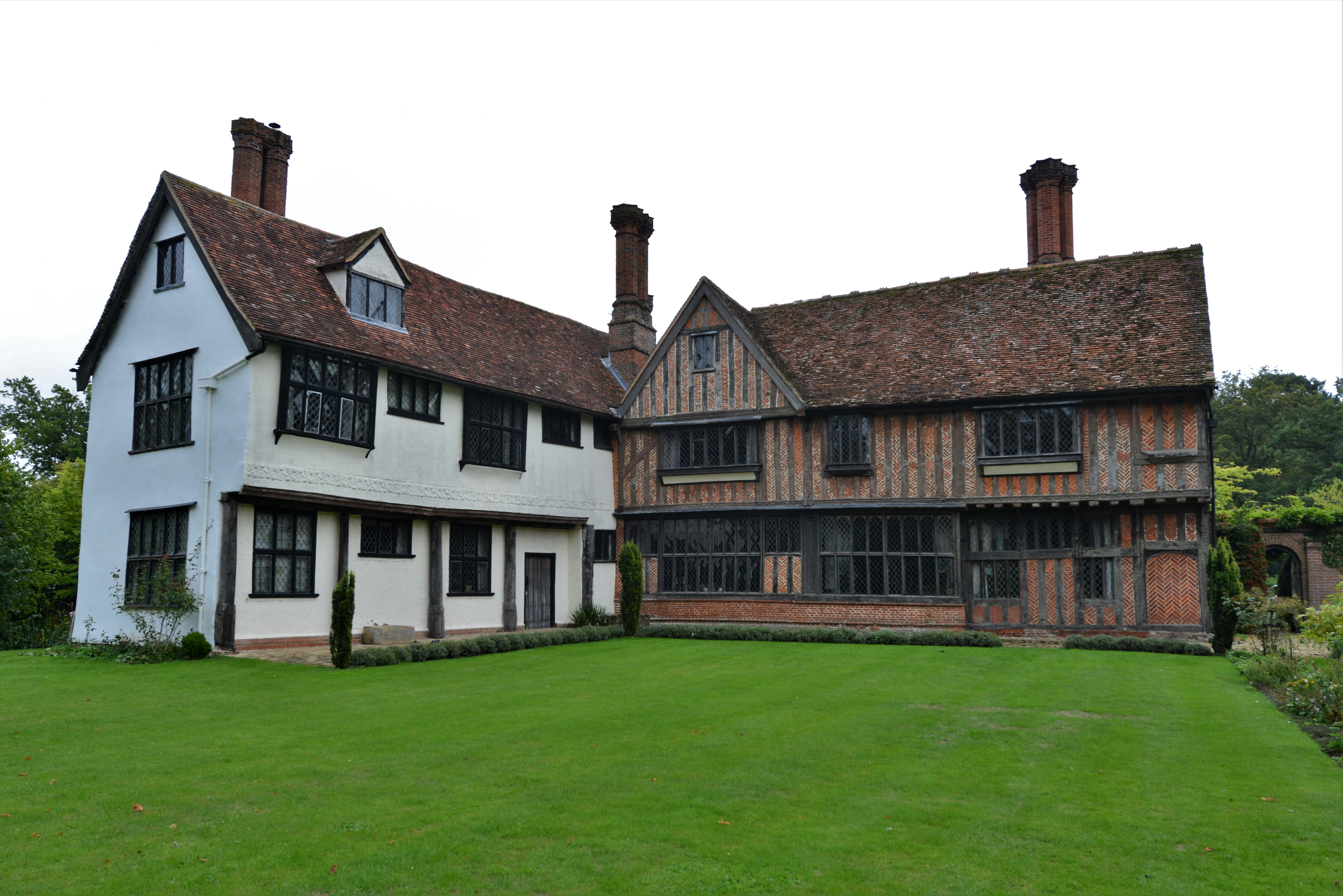

Otley Hall is a 16th-century English manor house in the civil parish of Otley, in the East Suffolk district, Suffolk, England. It is a Grade I listed building. The manor was previously known as Netherhall Manor.

== The Gosnold period ==
John Gosnold at first rented what became Otley Hall. By the sixteenth century Otley Manor was vested in the Gosnold family building, and soon their new building gained the status of a manorial building. Robert Gosnold was responsible for building the oldest extant parts of the building in 1512. The four-centred arch that provides the entrance bears his initials.

The Gosnold family relinquished control of the building around 1668 when it was sold to Sir Anthony Deane.

== Rebow period ==
Isaac Rebow bought Otley Hall in 1686. However, although the property remained in their family possession for over 200 years, it was never used by them as a residence. They let the property to tenant farmers on long leases. From 1763 it was rented by the Ling family for many years. However, when William Ling went bankrupt in 1880, the tenancy was taken over by Frederick Miller. When the Rebows sold the estate in 1900, Miller bought the property.

== The Sherston period ==
In 1910 Dorothy Sherston, the daughter of General William Parke, bought the house from Miller as a family home following her marriage to Somerset Sherston.

== Otley Hall gardens ==
The gardens were redesigned by Inigo Thomas, with a knot garden designed by Sylvia Landsberg.
