= Manordeifi =

Parish and community in Pembrokeshire, Wales

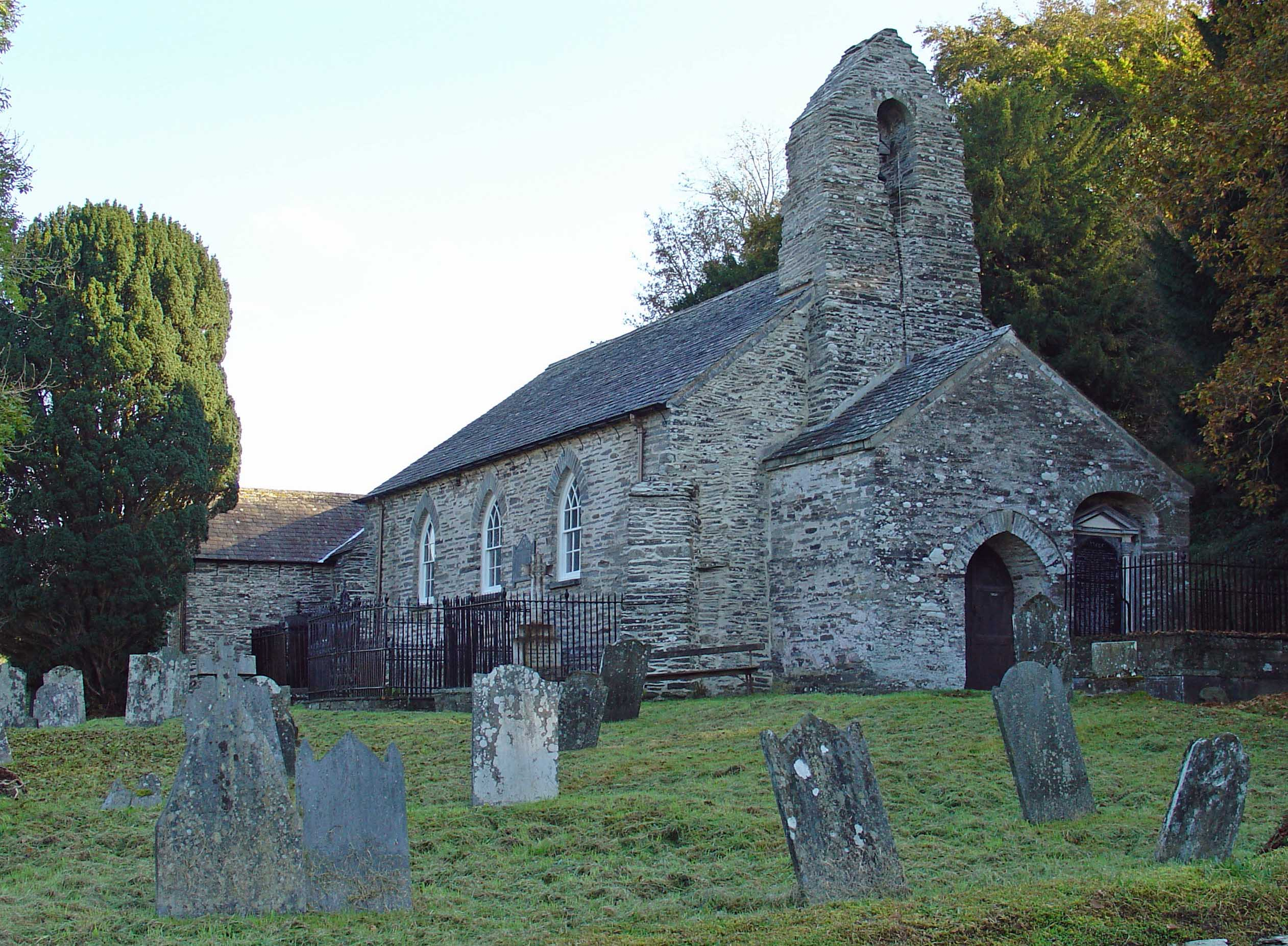
- The old parish church of St. David

- Location within Pembrokeshire
- Population: 551 (2011)
- OS grid reference: SN2288242263
- Principal area: Pembrokeshire
- Preserved county: Dyfed
- Country: Wales
- Sovereign state: United Kingdom
- Post town: Boncath
- Postcode district: SA37
- Dialling code: 01239
- Police: Dyfed-Powys
- Fire: Mid and West Wales
- Ambulance: Welsh
- UK Parliament: Preseli Pembrokeshire
- Senedd Cymru – Welsh Parliament: Ceredigion Penfro
- List of places UK Wales Pembrokeshire 52.05°N 4.583°W Map of the community

Manordeifi (Welsh: Maenordeifi) is a parish and community in the hundred of Cilgerran, in the northeast corner of Pembrokeshire, Wales. The population of the community in 2001 was 478. It has an elected community council and is part of the Cilgerran electoral ward for the purposes of elections to Pembrokeshire County Council.

In addition to scattered settlement, the parish contains the villages of Abercych and Newchapel (Welsh: Capelnewydd), and many listed buildings and structures.

== History ==
Manordeifi's old parish church, situated in the edge of the River Teifi floodplain at 52.05846°N 4.58557°W, was abandoned in favour of a new church built on the hill top in the nineteenth century. The old church (mainly 13th-14th century) preserves many old features. A coracle hangs in the porch, providing a means of escape during floods.

Manordeifi (as Manerdve) is marked on a 1578 parish map of Pembrokeshire.

The population of the parish was: 745 (1801): 956 (1851): 631 (1901): 602 (1951): 402 (1981). The percentage of Welsh speakers was: 87 (1891): 94 (1931): 74 (1971).

== Notable houses ==
There is an unusually large number of substantial mansions in the parish. These included Clynfyw, Ffynone (or Ffynnonau), Pentre and Castell Malgwyn.

=== Ffynone ===
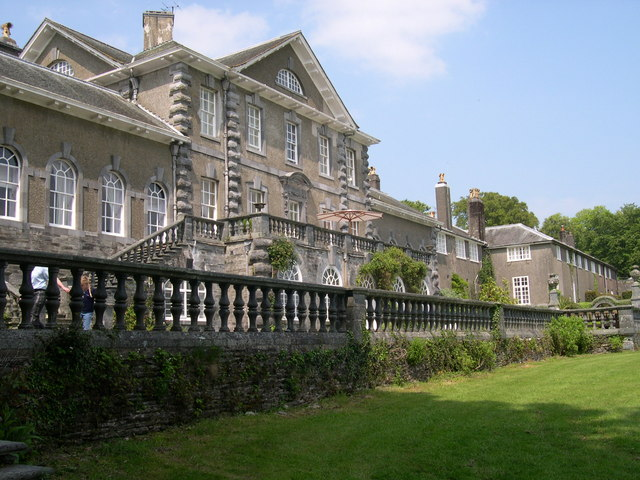
Ffynone House

The Ffynone estate at Boncath belonged at one time to the Morgan family of Blaenbwlan, from which Captain Stephen Colby bought it in 1752. The country house at Ffynone, a Grade I listed building, was designed by the architect John Nash and completed in 1799.

It was passed down in the Colby family to John Vaughan Colby, whose wife in 1902 commissioned architect and garden designer Inigo Thomas to improve the house and lay out the terraced gardens. John Vaughan died in 1919 and, having no sons, left the estate to his daughter Aline Margaret, who had married Captain Cecil John Herbert Spence-Jones, son of the Dean of Gloucester, in 1908; the marriage was a notable occasion, reported in great detail and an occasion for local celebration, despite there being no guests at the wedding and no reception owing to the bride's mother's state of health. Spence took the additional surname of Colby by royal licence in 1920 and subsequently sold the property in 1927 to a Glamorgan businessman.

The house, in twenty acres of woodland, was bought and restored from 1987 onwards by Owen Lloyd George, 3rd Earl Lloyd-George of Dwyfor, and remained in the Lloyd George family until sold in 2021, after Lloyd George's death.
