= David Lloyd George, 2nd Viscount Tenby =

Welsh peer (1922–1983)

David Lloyd George 2nd Viscount Tenby
- Born: 4 November 1922
- Died: 4 July 1983 (aged 60)
- Education: Eastbourne College
- Alma mater: Jesus College, Cambridge
- Parents: Gwilym Lloyd George (father); Edna Gwenfrom Jones (mother)
- Relatives: William Lloyd George (brother); David Lloyd George (paternal grandfather); Margaret Lloyd George (paternal grandmother)
- Military career
- Allegiance: United Kingdom
- Branch: British Army
- Service years: 1939–1945
- Rank: Captain
- Unit: Royal Artillery
- Conflicts: World War II

David Lloyd George, 2nd Viscount Tenby (4 November 1922 – 4 July 1983) was a Welsh peer, a grandson of the first David Lloyd George, British prime minister.

Lloyd George was the elder son of Gwilym Lloyd George, 1st Viscount Tenby, and Edna Gwenfrom Jones. He was educated at Eastbourne College, then was commissioned into the Royal Artillery during the Second World War, rising to the rank of Captain. After the war, he continued his education at Jesus College, Cambridge, and graduated BA in 1947, proceeding to MA in 1949.

On 14 February 1967, Lloyd George succeeded his father as Viscount Tenby and took his seat in the House of Lords. He died unmarried in 1983 and was succeeded by his younger brother, William Lloyd George.

== Arms ==
Coat of arms of David Lloyd George, 2nd Viscount Tenby
Crest "A demi-dragon Gules holding between the claws a portcullis Sable." Escutcheon "Azure over water barry wavy in base a bridge of one arch Proper, on a chief Argent a portcullis Sable between two daffodils stalked and leaved Proper." Supporters "Dexter, a dragon Gules, Sinister a lion Or; each gorged with a collar compony Argent and Vert, pendent from that of the dexter an escutcheon Argent charged with a martlet Sable, and from that of the sinister an escutcheon Gules charged with a port between two towers Argent." Motto Y gwir yn erbyn y byd (The truth against the world).

Peerage of the United Kingdom
Preceded by Gwilym Lloyd George	Viscount Tenby; 1967–1983	Succeeded by William Lloyd George
