= Owen Lloyd George, 3rd Earl Lloyd-George of Dwyfor =

British peer (1924–2010)

The Right Honourable The Earl Lloyd-George of Dwyfor DL

Member of the House of Lords Lord Temporal
- In office 1 May 1968 – 11 November 1999; Hereditary peerage
- Preceded by: The 2nd Earl Lloyd-George of Dwyfor
- Succeeded by: seat abolished

Personal details
- Born: Owen Lloyd George; 28 April 1924
- Died: 29 July 2010 (aged 86)
- Party: Crossbench

Owen Lloyd George, 3rd Earl Lloyd-George of Dwyfor DL (28 April 1924 – 29 July 2010), was a British peer. He sat as a crossbencher in the House of Lords.

== Early life ==
Lord Lloyd-George was the son of Richard Lloyd George, 2nd Earl Lloyd-George of Dwyfor, and Roberta Ida Freeman McAlpine, the youngest daughter of Sir Robert McAlpine, 1st Baronet, the founder of the engineering company Sir Robert McAlpine Ltd. He was also the grandson of David Lloyd George, Liberal Prime Minister of the United Kingdom between 1916 and 1922, on whom the earldom was conferred at its creation in 1945.

Lloyd-George was educated at Oundle School, where he was featherweight boxing champion, but left before his 17th birthday to be apprenticed as a civil engineer to Sir Alfred McAlpine, 3rd Baronet.

== Career ==
In 1942, Lloyd-George was commissioned into the Welsh Guards, where he gained the rank of Captain. In the Second World War, he fought with the 3rd Battalion in Italy between 1944 and 1945. After the war, he served with the 2nd Battalion in Germany.

On the death of his grandfather in March 1945, Prime Minister, Winston Churchill, determined that all four of his old friend's grandsons in the services should be brought home to attend the funeral in north Wales. One was an artillery officer stationed on the Rhine, another was flying a bomber, a third was serving in HMS Enterprise in the North Sea and the fourth, Lloyd-George, was fighting in Italy. Lloyd-George was at once dispatched to Naples by fighter plane, given a bed in Field Marshal Alexander's villa, flown by bomber to England the next morning, flown to north Wales in a Spitfire (flown by a Polish pilot with a schoolboy atlas and no knowledge of Wales) and delivered at Llanystumdwy one hour before the funeral.

On the death of his father on 1 May 1968 he succeeded as Earl Lloyd-George of Dwyfor and became an active member in the House of Lords. He held the office of Deputy Lieutenant (DL) of Dyfed in 1993.

In November 1999, the House of Lords Act was passed, limiting the number of hereditary peers entitled to sit in the House of Lords to 92. As a result, Lloyd-George lost his seat.

== Marriages and children ==
Lloyd-George married first Ruth Margaret Coit (died 16 May 2003), daughter of Richard Coit and Violet Josephine Slocock, on 8 September 1949, but they divorced in 1982. With Coit he had three children, two sons and one daughter:

1. David Richard Owen Lloyd George, 4th Earl Lloyd-George of Dwyfor (born 22 January 1951)
2. Robert John Daniel Lloyd George (born 13 August 1952)
3. Lady Julia Margaret Violet Lloyd George

He married secondly in 1982 to (Cecily) Josephine, Countess of Woolton (1925–2012), daughter of Sir Alexander Penrose Gordon-Cumming, 5th Baronet, and Elizabeth, Countess Cawdor. It was her third marriage, and her third to a peer.

== Other information ==
- Lloyd-George carried the Sword at the Investiture of the Prince of Wales at Caernarvon in 1969.
- He did not acquire a home in Wales until he was 63, when he bought Ffynone, a country house built by John Nash in a remote corner of Pembrokeshire.
- Lloyd-George was the author of a modest, lively and good-natured volume of memoirs entitled A Tale of Two Grandfathers (1999).

== Arms ==
Coat of arms of Owen Lloyd George, 3rd Earl Lloyd-George of Dwyfor
Crest A demi-dragon Gules holding between the claws a portcullis Sable. Escutcheon Azure over water barry wavy in base a bridge of one arch Proper, on a chief Argent a portcullis Sable between two daffodils stalked and leaved Proper. Supporters Dexter, a Dragon Or, Sinister, an Eagle, wings addorsed Or, each gorged with a Collar Vert. Motto Y gwir yn erbyn y byd (The truth against the world).

Peerage of the United Kingdom
Preceded by Richard Lloyd George	Earl Lloyd-George of Dwyfor; 1968–2010	Succeeded by David Lloyd George
