= William Lloyd George, 3rd Viscount Tenby =

British peer (1927–2023)

The Right Honourable The Viscount Tenby JP
- Speaking in Parliament, 2012

Member of the House of Lords
- Lord Temporal
- Hereditary peerage 17 November 1983 – 11 November 1999
- Preceded by: The 2nd Viscount Tenby
- Succeeded by: Seat abolished
- Elected Hereditary Peer; 11 November 1999 – 1 May 2015
- Election: 1999
- Preceded by: Seat established
- Succeeded by: The 4th Baron Mountevans

Personal details
- Born: 7 November 1927
- Died: 7 June 2023 (aged 95)
- Party: Crossbench

William Lloyd George, 3rd Viscount Tenby, JP (7 November 1927 – 7 June 2023), was a British peer and army officer. A grandson of the Prime Minister David Lloyd George, he was among the 90 hereditary peers elected to remain in the House of Lords after the passing of the House of Lords Act 1999.

== Family and education ==
Tenby was the younger son of Gwilym Lloyd George, 1st Viscount Tenby (a National Liberal politician who had served as Home Secretary from 1954 to 1957 before becoming Viscount Tenby), and Edna Gwenfrom Jones. He was the grandson of the Liberal Prime Minister David Lloyd George, whom he often visited at Bron-y-de in Churt, Surrey, during school holidays.

In 1955 he married Ursula Diana Ethel Medlicott (1929–2022), daughter of Lt.-Col. Henry Edward Medlicott and Clare Charlotte Marjorie Gabrielle Gosselin, and a niece of the cricketer Walter Medlicott. They had three children:

- Sara Gwenfron Lloyd George (born 1957)
- Clare Mair Lloyd George (born 1961)
- Timothy Henry Gwilym Lloyd George, 4th Viscount Tenby (born 1962)

== Education and career ==
After attending Eastbourne College, Tenby served with the Royal Welch Fusiliers and later retained a Territorial Army commission with the regiment. In 1949 he went to St Catharine's College, Cambridge, to study history, and obtained a Bachelor's degree.

He worked as an advertising manager for United Dominions Trust before joining the investment bank Kleinwort Benson in 1974 as a public relations adviser. He left that role in 1988 and later chaired St James Public Relations.

=== House of Lords ===
In 1983 he succeeded his elder brother David as Viscount Tenby. He sat as a crossbencher in the House of Lords, serving on the Procedure and Privileges Committee and the Committee of Selection, and was among the 90 hereditary peers elected to remain in the House of Lords after the passing of the House of Lords Act 1999. He spoke on issues such as over-development in south-east England, unit fines, wind turbines in areas of outstanding natural beauty, the right to die and abortion.

After retirement from the House of Lords was made possible by the House of Lords Reform Act 2014, Tenby stood down on 1 May 2015. His retirement triggered a by-election that was won by Jeffrey Evans, 4th Baron Mountevans.

=== Personal life ===
Tenby served as a Justice of the Peace for Hampshire, including as chair of the north-east Hampshire magistrates from 1990 to 1994, and led the Council for the Protection of Rural England in the county. He died on 7 June 2023, at the age of 95.

== Arms ==
Coat of arms of William Lloyd George, 3rd Viscount Tenby
| Crest "A demi-dragon Gules holding between the claws a portcullis Sable." Escutcheon "Azure over water barry wavy in base a bridge of one arch Proper, on a chief Argent a portcullis Sable between two daffodils stalked and leaved Proper." Supporters "Dexter, a dragon Gules, Sinister a lion Or; each gorged with a collar compony Argent and Vert, pendent from that of the dexter an escutcheon Argent charged with a martlet Sable, and from that of the sinister an escutcheon Gules charged with a port between two towers Argent." Motto Y gwir yn erbyn y byd (The truth against the world). |

== Notes ==
Peerage of the United Kingdom
| Preceded by David Lloyd George | Viscount Tenby; 1983–2023; Member of the House of Lords (1983–1999) | Succeeded by Timothy Lloyd George |
Parliament of the United Kingdom
| New office created by the House of Lords Act 1999 | Elected hereditary peer to the House of Lords under the House of Lords Act 1999; 1999–2015 | Succeeded by The Lord Mountevans |
