= Inigo Thomas (garden designer) =

British artist and garden designer

- Born: 25 December 1865; Warmsworth, Yorkshire, England
- Died: 27 March 1950 (aged 84); London, England
- Occupation: Architect

Francis Inigo Thomas (25 December 1865 – 27 March 1950) was a British artist and garden designer.

Thomas was born in Warmsworth, Yorkshire, the fifth son of Rev. Charles Edward Thomas and Georgiana Mary Hely-Hutchinson, daughter of Hon. Henry Hely-Hutchinson. She was the granddaughter of Hon. Francis Hely-Hutchinson and niece of the 3rd Earl of Donoughmore. He was a cousin of civil servant Sir Inigo Thomas (1846–1929). Thomas was the nephew of William Brodrick Thomas (1811–1898), one of the principal garden designers of the latter half of the 19th century.

Thomas trained in the office of the architects G. F. Bodley and Thomas Garner.

As well as designing numerous formal gardens, he illustrated Reginald Blomfield's book The Formal Garden in England, which was published in 1892.

== Works ==
- Rock garden for Sandringham House, Norfolk, 1870s
- Gardens for Barrow Court, Barrow Gurney, Somerset, 1882–1896
- Formal gardens for Athelhampton Hall, Dorset, 1891 onwards
- Gardens for Parnham House, near Beaminster, Dorset
- Gardens for Rotherfield Hall, Rotherfield, East Sussex, 1897
- Gardens for Otley Hall, Ipswich, Suffolk
- Tirah Memorial, Bonn Square, Oxford, 1900
- Terraced gardens for Ffynone, Pembrokeshire, 1904
- Terraced garden for Chantmarle, near Frome St Quintin, Dorset, 1910

== Sources ==
- Nairn, Ian; Pevsner, Nikolaus (1965). Sussex. The Buildings of England. Harmondsworth: Penguin Books. ISBN 0 14 071028 0.
- Newman, John; Pevsner, Nikolaus (1972). Dorset. The Buildings of England. Harmondsworth: Penguin Books. ISBN 0 14 071044 2.
