= Boncath =

Village and community in Pembrokeshire, Wales

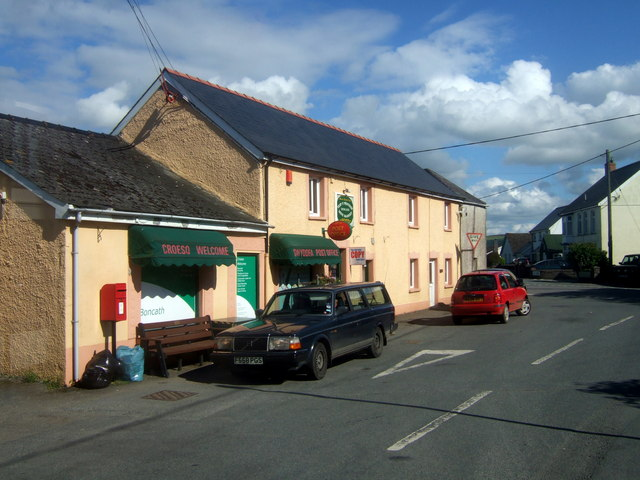
- Boncath Post Office and shop

- Location within Pembrokeshire
- Population: 736 (2011)
- OS grid reference: SN2038
- Principal area: Pembrokeshire
- Country: Wales
- Sovereign state: United Kingdom
- Post town: Boncath
- Postcode district: SA37
- Dialling code: 01239
- Police: Dyfed-Powys
- Fire: Mid and West Wales
- Ambulance: Welsh
- UK Parliament: Ceredigion Preseli
- Senedd Cymru – Welsh Parliament: Ceredigion Penfro
- List of places UK Wales Pembrokeshire 52.01°N 04.62°W Map of the community

Boncath is a village, community and postal district in north Pembrokeshire, Wales, about 5 miles (8.0 km) west of Newcastle Emlyn.

The village stands at a cross-roads linking the nearby settlements of Newchapel (Capelnewydd), Eglwyswrw, Blaenffos and Bwlchygroes. Formerly a hamlet around an inn, the village developed after the coming of the railway in 1885.

== History ==
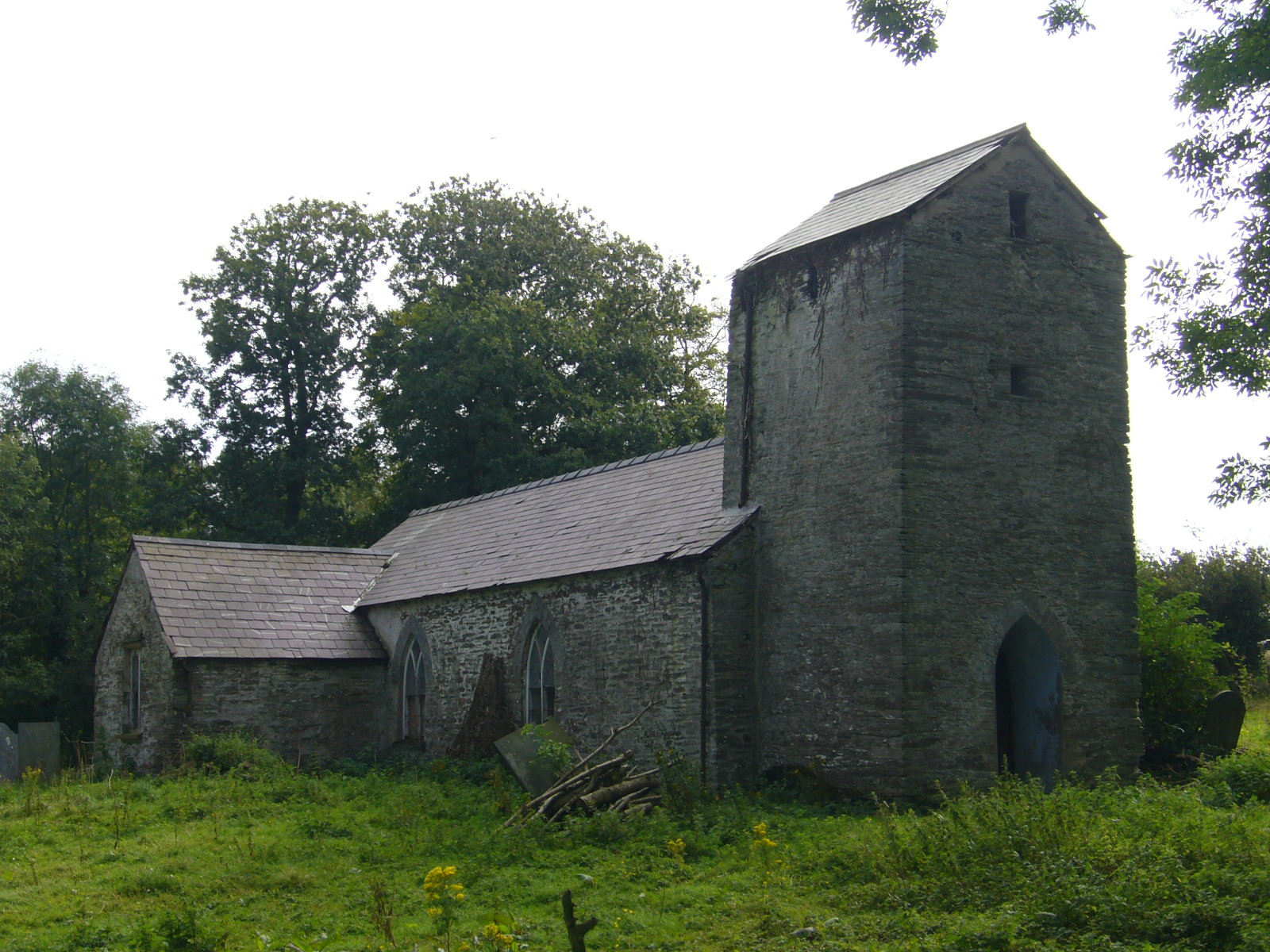
Church of St Michael, Penbedw in 2007

The name of the village comes from the Welsh word for buzzard, bwncath. It was recorded on a pre-1850 historical parish map as in the parish of Llanfihangel Penbedw (St Michael) in the Hundred of Cilgerran. Llanfihangel Penbedw parish church, which dates from 1325 or earlier, was restored in 1859 but fell into disuse in the 1970s. Part of the village lies in Capel Colman parish.

The Boncath Inn (formerly Tavern) has stood at the crossroads at least since 1862 when Thomas Rees, publican, farmer, and grocer, was listed as bankrupt in October 1862 and discharged in the December. Despite the coming of the railway, in 1890 David George of Boncath Tavern, innkeeper and farmer, was reported as receiving an order and adjudication in bankruptcy. In June he was subjected to public examination in Carmarthen. In August, the dividend payable to creditors was fixed at 4s 10½d to the pound (£), or about 24 per cent, payable in September.

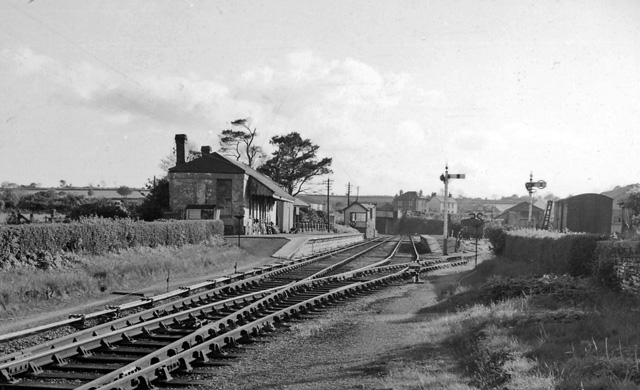
Boncath Station, 1962

Boncath developed into a larger settlement when the Whitland and Taf Vale Railway was extended to Cardigan in 1885. Boncath railway station, opened in September 1886, was a two-platform stop between Crymmych Arms and Kilgerran Halt on the Whitland and Cardigan Railway, known as "Cardi Bach". The line was closed due to the 1963 Beeching Axe and the station building became a private residence.

The village once included three tailors, a cobbler and a dressmaker, and in 2000 a new Community Hall was completed.

There are 27 listed structures in the community, 19 of which are associated with Cilwendeg House, described as one of the most important mansions in Pembrokeshire. Cilwendeg dates from the late 18th century and was built on the site of a former property dating back to the 1600s. One of the features of the property is the Grade II* listed Shell House built in the late 1820s. Many other structures on the property are listed. The 21 bedroom mansion was a care home from 1952 to 2010. Cilwendeg hosted the 2013 Urdd National Eisteddfod.

== Amenities ==
The Boncath Inn (now closed) stands in the centre of the village along with a village shop/Post Office and a number of small businesses. Bus service 430 passes through the village, running between Cardigan and Narberth.

The Welsh Independent Chapel at Fachendre (Fach-hendre), established in 1879, is to the south-east of the village and is a historic monument.

The Community Hall, a registered charity, provides a venue for events in the local area.

== Administration ==
The village has its own elected community council and is part of the Clydau electoral ward for the purposes of elections to Pembrokeshire County Council. The civic community is split into two electoral wards: Llanfihangel, consisting of the former parishes of Castellan (including the village of Blaenffos) and Llanfihangel Penbedw, and Capel Colman, consisting of the parishes of Capel Colman and Penrydd.

Preceding station	Historical railways	Following station
Crymych	Great Western Railway; Whitland & Cardigan Railway	Cilgerran
