= Penrydd =

Former parish in Pembrokeshire, Wales

Coordinates: 52.001°N 4.596°W

- Location within Pembrokeshire
- OS grid reference: SN2181836846
- Community: Boncath
- Principal area: Pembrokeshire
- Country: Wales
- Sovereign state: United Kingdom
- Post town: Boncath
- Postcode district: SA
- Dialling code: 01239
- Police: Dyfed-Powys
- Fire: Mid and West Wales
- Ambulance: Welsh
- UK Parliament: Preseli Pembrokeshire
- Senedd Cymru – Welsh Parliament: Preseli Pembrokeshire

Penrydd (variously spelled Penrhydd, Penrhudd, Penrith, Penreth or Penrieth) is a former parish in the Hundred of Kilgerran, north Pembrokeshire, Wales. The parish's history is closely linked with that of Castellan, and included parts of the present villages of Blaenffos and Crymych.

== History ==
=== Church ===
The parish, in the 1530s, was unique in Wales in furnishing the title of a suffragan see, namely Bishop of Penrydd, and an Inventory of Ancient Monuments explains how this may have come about. The parish is marked (as Penrith) on a 1578 parish map of Pembrokeshire.

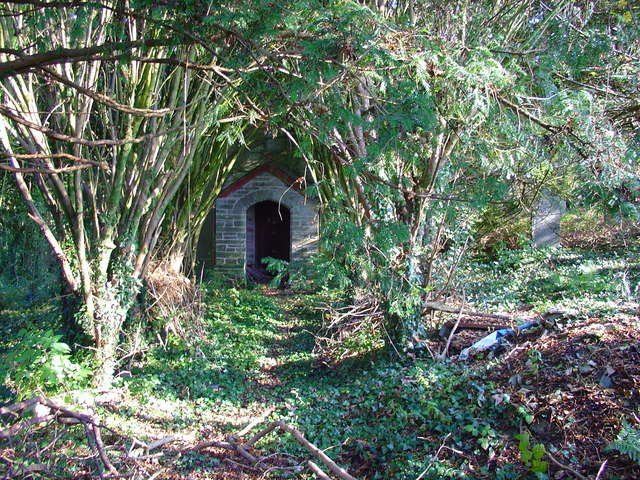
Abandoned Penrydd parish church

The parish church of St Cristiolus (Church in Wales) existed at least as early as 1799, the earliest date from which parish register information has been garnered. From 1799 to 1858 the parish register is "Penrhydd with Castellan", Castellan being a chapelry at that time. The place name and church are recorded by the Royal Commission as historic place names.

The living in 1870 was described as "...a rectory in the diocese of St David's. Value £100. Patron, the Lord Chancellor". The church had been rebuilt in 1841 and restored in 1911; in 1914 it was described as "plain" and "whitewashed".

A survey by Dyfed Archaeological Trust for Cadw in 2011 describes the present churchyard as "...suboval/subrectangular, now poorly defined..." and the church as "...small, comprising chancel, nave and west porch. It is now in private hands...".

The church was described in about 2012 as abandoned.

=== Population and property ===
The annual value of the Real property of the parish, including Castellan, was £756 in 1815 when the joint population was 273. By 1821 and 1831 the population of Penrydd parish alone was 190 and 219 respectively.

In 1831-33 the parish (including the chapelry of Castellan) was home to 346 inhabitants and included both enclosed arable land or pasture and unenclosed moorland. About 70% of males over 20 were involved in agriculture with the rest in retail or manufacturing trades. Of those in agriculture, the majority farmed in their own right, as opposed to labouring for others.

Tithe apportionments of 1837 and tithe maps of 1844 are held at the National Archives.

By 1881 the majority of males (about 60%) were still in agriculture, but there were more involved in other occupations such as quarrying. There is an Ordnance Survey-marked disused quarry close to Castellan Farm.

Penrydd was included in the National Farm Survey of 1941-3 during World War 2, the records of which are held at the National Archives.

== Notable people ==
- William Richards (1749–1818), a Welsh Baptist minister; he spent much of his life in King's Lynn.

== Today ==
Penrydd was absorbed in 1974 into the community of Boncath.
