= Pentre Galar =

Village in Pembrokeshire, Wales

Coordinates: 51.9475°N 04.6508°W

- Location within Pembrokeshire
- Community: Mynachlog-ddu
- Principal area: Pembrokeshire
- Country: Wales
- Sovereign state: United Kingdom
- Postcode district: SA
- Police: Dyfed-Powys
- Fire: Mid and West Wales
- Ambulance: Welsh
- UK Parliament: Preseli Pembrokeshire
- Senedd Cymru – Welsh Parliament: Preseli Pembrokeshire

Pentre Galar (or Pentregalar, Pentre-Galar) is a small settlement in the Preseli Mountains south of the village of Crymych, north Pembrokeshire, Wales, on the A478 Cardigan to Tenby road. The western part of the settlement lies in the parish of Mynachlog-ddu and the eastern part in Llanfyrnach parish.

== Name ==
The English translation for pentre is village, and galar can mean mourning, sorrow or grief. The origin of this name is obscure.

== Geography ==
The land slopes from Crugiau Dwy at a height of 359 metres (1,178 ft) in the west down towards the valley of Afon Gafel, a tributary of the River Taf. Most of the terrain is above 250 metres (820 ft). Land use is agricultural, with a rectilinear field pattern. Minor roads connect Pentre Galar with the villages of Hermon, Glandwr and Mynachlog-ddu, and most houses are alongside the main road. The part of the settlement to the west of the A478 lies within the Pembrokeshire Coast National Park.

== History ==
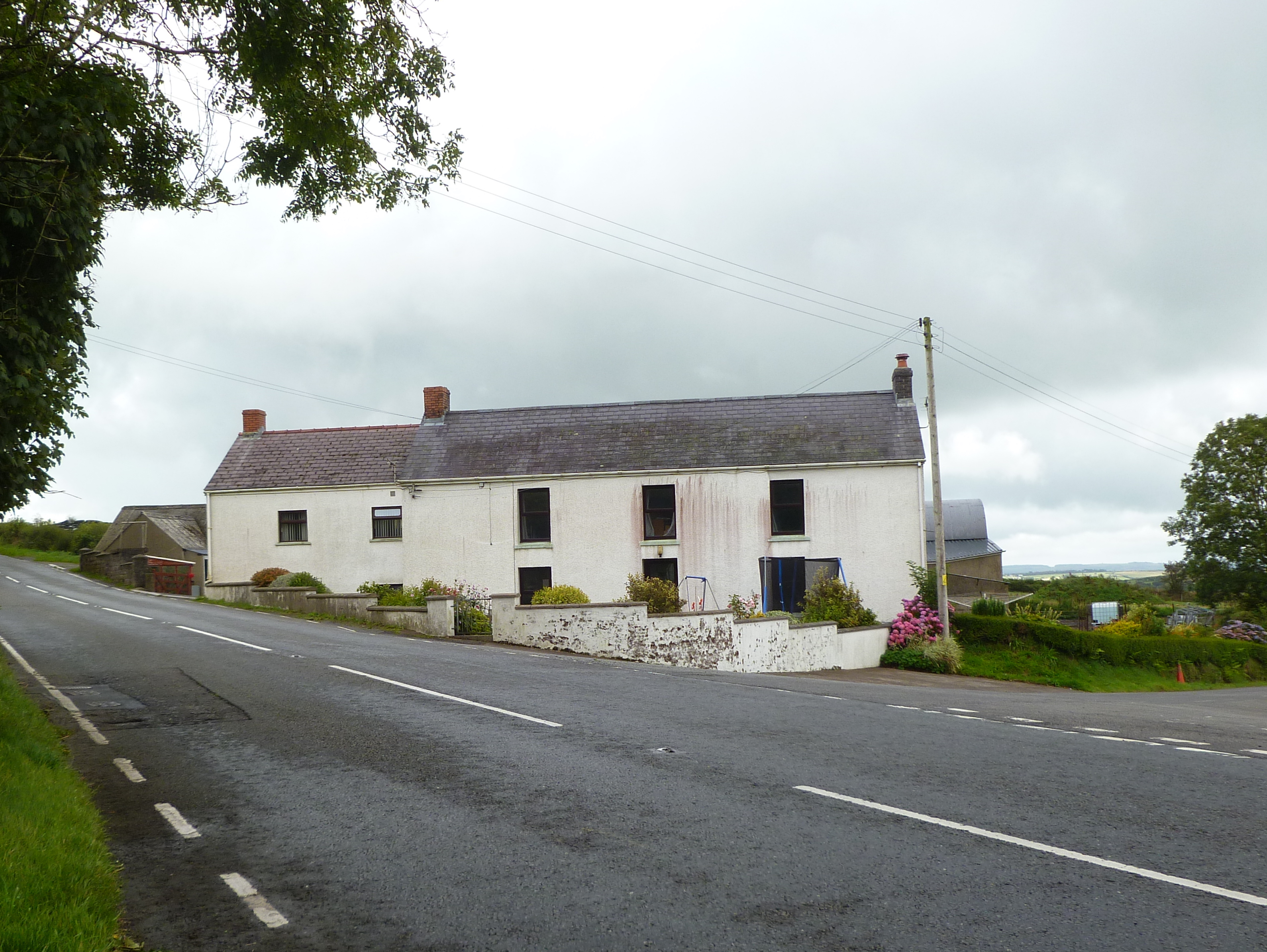
The former inn, Ty-mawr

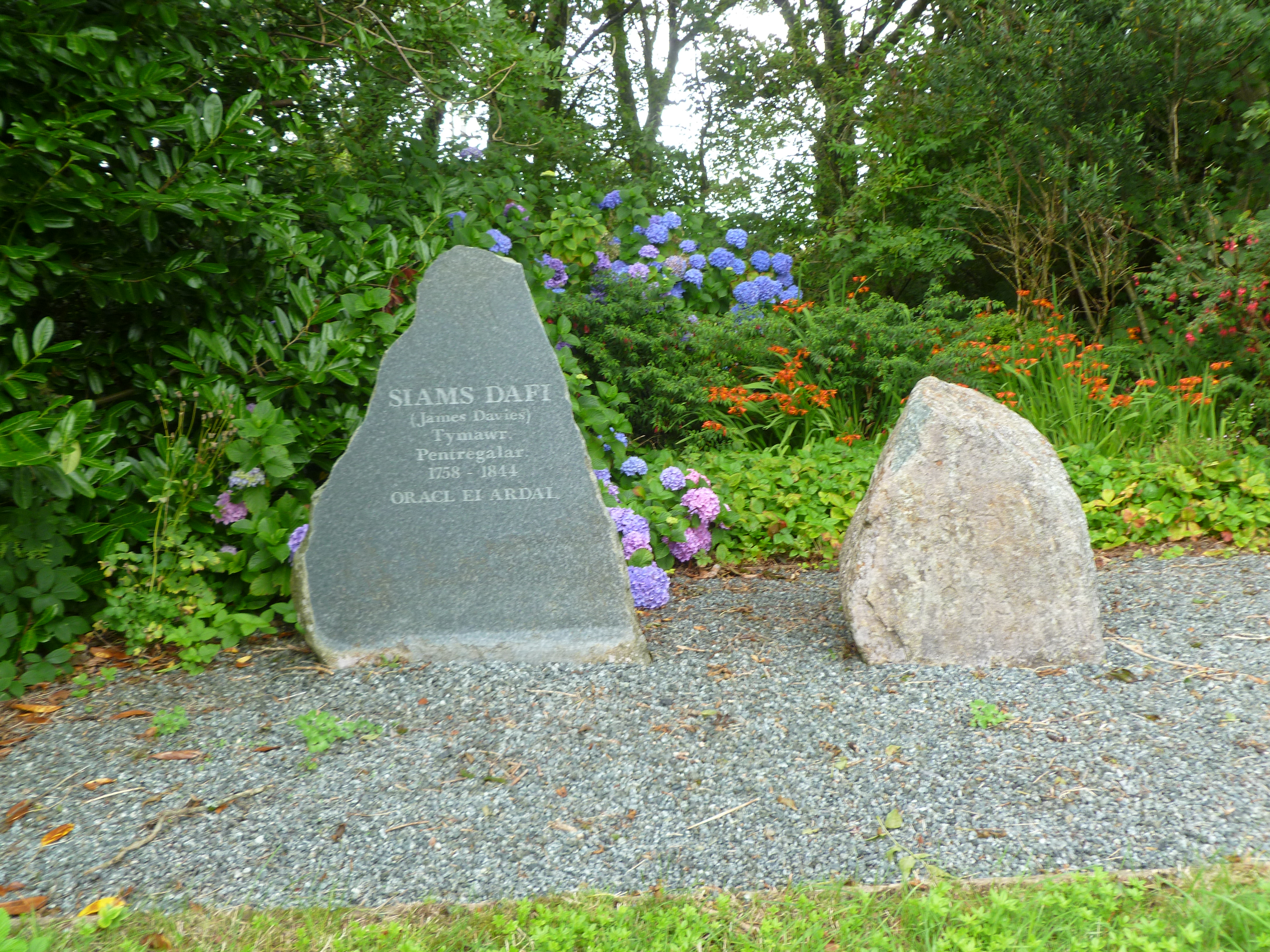
Monument to Siams Dafi (James Davies), the preacher who built Ty-mawr

The land surrounding Pentre Galar was enclosed by Act of Parliament in 1812, resulting in the orderly layout of small, rectangular fields. Dyfed Archaeological Trust suggests earlier settlement, and notes that the main road (now the A478) through the village is marked on an early map as a medieval route, but was turnpiked between 1791 and 1809 under the Whitland Turnpike Trust. The Royal Commission records the name Pentre Galar from an early 20th century map, and has in its collection aerial photographs of old field banks taken in 1999.

In 1892, the freehold for a number of farms of up to 149 acres (60 ha) in Pentre Galar was offered for sale, with the tenants' names listed.

=== Ty-mawr ===
Ty-mawr, on the corner of the road leading to Hermon, was in earlier times an inn on the Cardigan to Clynderwen coach route. It saw its first motor car in 1909. Owner and builder of the inn, James Davies (Siams Dafi, 1758–1844), a preacher and community stalwart, was the force behind much road improvement in the area, including the main road, in the years 1809 to 1812. A memorial stone to Davies was erected in 2007, across the road from the inn.

=== Preseli transmitting station ===
The Preseli transmitting station was constructed in 1962 near the summit of Crugiau Dwy, and by 1973 was broadcasting colour TV to West Wales, fairly late in comparison with the rest of the UK, owing to the sparse population in the area it served.

== Notable people ==
The poet, Independent minister and Marxist Thomas Evan Nicholas (Niclas y Glais, 1879–1971) was born and brought up in Pentre Galar; he was born in the cottage Blaenwaun Felen and brought up in 'Y Llety', a smallholding on the slopes of Foel Dyrch and Crugiau Dwy. A memorial stone to T E Nicholas was unveiled on Crugiau Dwy in October 2019.

The poet and Independent minister Daniel John Davies (1885–1970) was born at Waunfelen, a cottage in Pentre Galar. He was taught the rules of cynghanedd (Welsh strict metre poetry) in Pentregalar by William Nicholas, T E Nicholas' elder brother.
