= Llanfyrnach railway station =

Disused railway station in Llanfyrnach, Pembrokeshire

Llanfyrnach
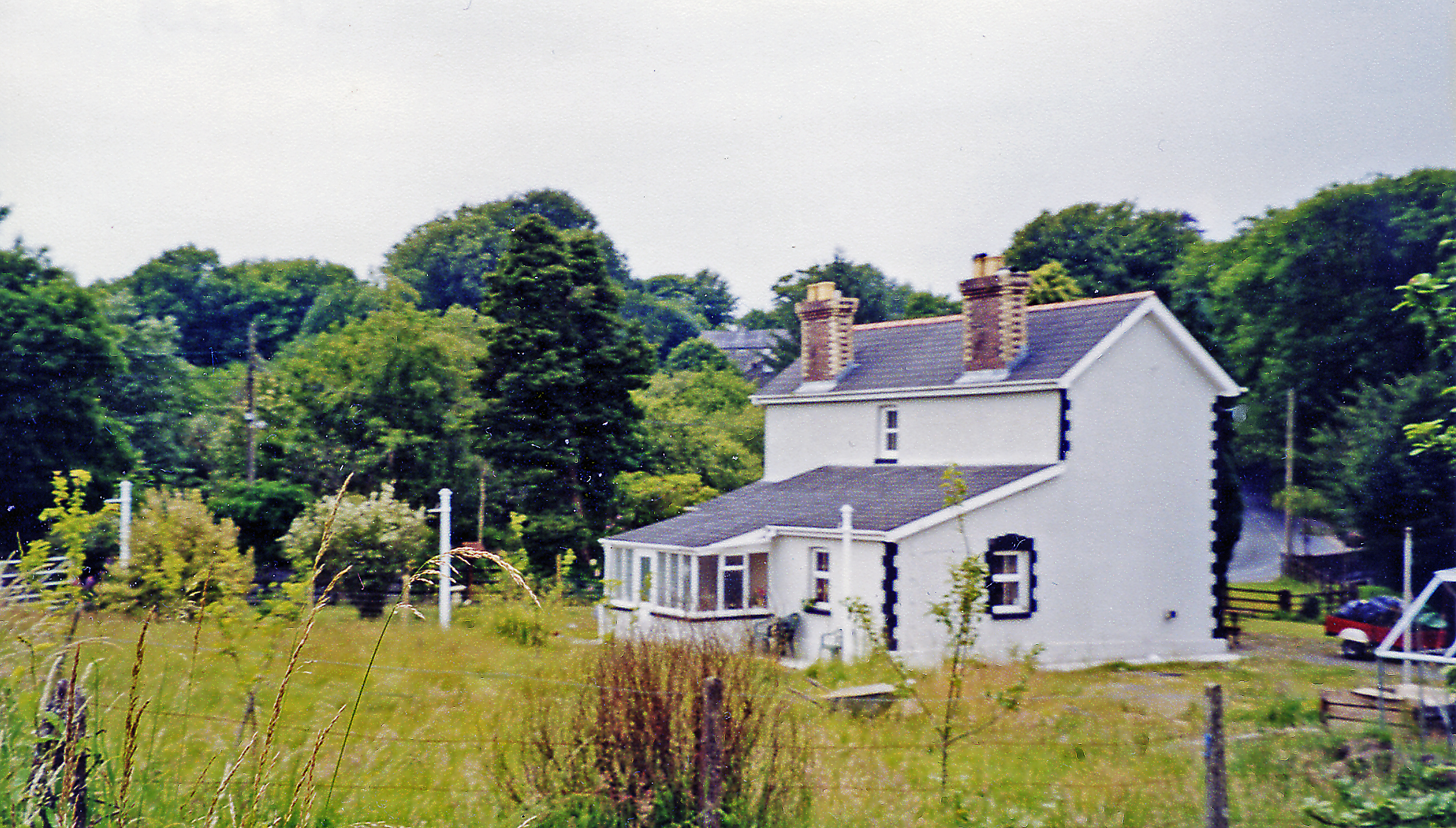
- The site of the station, looking northeast towards Cardigan, in 2003

General information
- Location: Llanfyrnach, Pembrokeshire; Wales
- Coordinates: 51.9508°N 4.5886°W
- Grid reference: SN222312
- Platforms: 1

Other information
- Status: Disused

History
- Original company: Whitland and Taf Vale Railway
- Pre-grouping: Whitland and Cardigan Railway
- Post-grouping: Great Western Railway; British Railways (Western Region)

Key dates
- 12 July 1875: Opened
- 10 September 1962: Closed to passengers
- 27 May 1963: Closed to goods
Location

Llanfyrnach railway station served the village of Llanfyrnach, Pembrokeshire, Wales, from 1875 to 1963 on the Whitland and Cardigan Railway.

== History ==
The station was opened on 12 July 1875 by the Whitland and Taf Vale Railway. It was situated north of a junction between two minor roads. The first station only had a wooden building. A new station was built in 1886. This had a stone building which was the stationmaster's house as well as a booking office and a waiting room. Two goods sheds were behind the platform and at the south end of the station was the signal box. This was later replaced by a ground frame in a wood cabin. At the north end was the goods yard which had two sidings and was controlled by the signal box. The north siding served a cattle dock. The nearby Llanfyrnach supplied some goods traffic to the station until it closed. The station closed to passengers on 10 September 1962 but remained open to goods traffic (besides parcels) until 27 May 1963.

Preceding station	Disused railways	Following station
Glogue Halt; Line and station closed	Whitland and Cardigan Railway	Rhydowen Halt; Line and station closed
