= Daniel John Davies =

Daniel John Davies (2 September 1885 – 4 June 1970) was a Welsh Independent (Congregationalist) minister and Welsh language poet. He published under the name 'D.J. Davies' and was also well known as 'Davies Capel Als'.

He was born in Waenfelen, a cottage in Pentre Galar near Crymych, in the Preseli Hills of North Pembrokeshire, the third son of John Morris Davies and his wife Ann. After his parents and his two brothers died while he was a child, he moved to Llanfyrnach to live with his mother's sister.

He attended Glandŵr Independent chapel, Llanfyrnach, where, influenced by the minister, O. R. Owen, he began preaching himself on Whit Sunday 1906. He graduated in Hebrew from University College, Cardiff in 1913, then studied Theology at the Memorial College, Brecon.

In 1916 he was ordained to the ministry at Capel Als, Llanelli. He served Capel Als as its minister for over forty years, until his retirement in 1958. He was chair of the Union of Welsh Independents in 1957.

A popular poet, he won the Chair at the National Eisteddfod in 1932, and won the cywydd competition four times. He was also a frequent adjudicator. R. Williams Parry praised his mastery of the Welsh strict metres; and in Llanelli he held classes in cynghanedd. A collection of his poetry, Cywyddau a chaniadau eraill, was published in 1968. He wrote a number of hymns and was one of the editors of Caniedydd Cynulleidfaol (1960), the Welsh Independents' hymnbook.

He was a strong radical both in his religious and his political views. A pacifist, he opposed the First World War and supported conscientious objectors.

He married Enid Jones, daughter of D. Stanley Jones, minister of the Independent chapel at Caernarfon.

He died on 4 June 1970; his ashes were buried in Glandŵr cemetery.

== Sources ==
- Edwards, Huw (2009). Capeli Llanelli. Our Rich Heritage. Carmarthenshire County Council. ISBN 978-0-906821-77-0.
