= Glogue Halt railway station =

Disused railway station in Glogue, Pembrokeshire

Glogue Halt
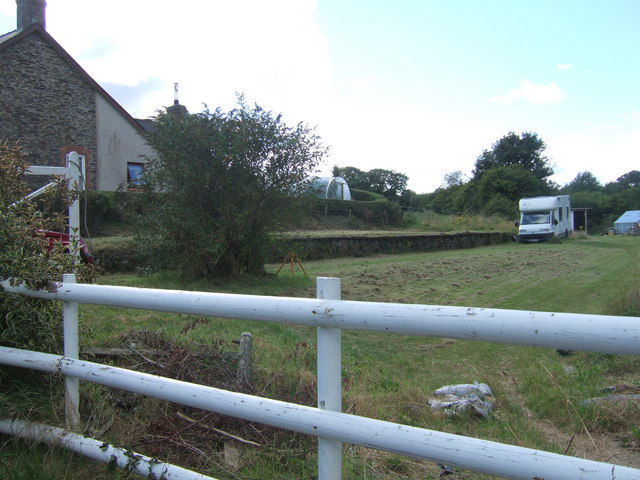
- The site of the station in 2007

General information
- Location: Glogue, Pembrokeshire; Wales
- Coordinates: 51.9623°N 4.598°W
- Grid reference: SN216325
- Platforms: 1

Other information
- Status: Disused

History
- Original company: Whitland and Taf Vale Railway
- Pre-grouping: Whitland and Cardigan Railway
- Post-grouping: Great Western Railway; British Railways (Western Region)

Key dates
- 12 July 1875: Opened as Glogue
- September 1956: Name changed to Glogue Halt
- 10 September 1962: Closed
Location

Glogue Halt railway station served the hamlet of Glogue, Pembrokeshire, Wales, from 1875 to 1962 on the Whitland and Cardigan Railway.

== History ==
The station was opened on 12 July 1875 by the Whitland and Taf Vale Railway. It was situated on the west side of a minor road. A permanent station replaced the original in 1886. This new station had a timber building which was the booking office and a waiting room. The stationmaster's house was also nearby. To the west was Glogue Quarry which closed in 1926. The station was downgraded to an unstaffed halt in September 1956, thus the suffix 'halt' was added to its name. Staff continued to work at the station to control the level crossing and allow access to the goods yard. The station closed on 10 September 1962. The platform and level crossing still remain. The stationmaster's house is now a private residence.

Preceding station	Disused railways	Following station
Crymmych Arms; Line and station closed	Whitland and Cardigan Railway	Llanfyrnach; Line and station closed
