= Kilgerran Halt railway station =

Disused railway station in Cilgerran, Pembrokeshire

Kilgerran Halt
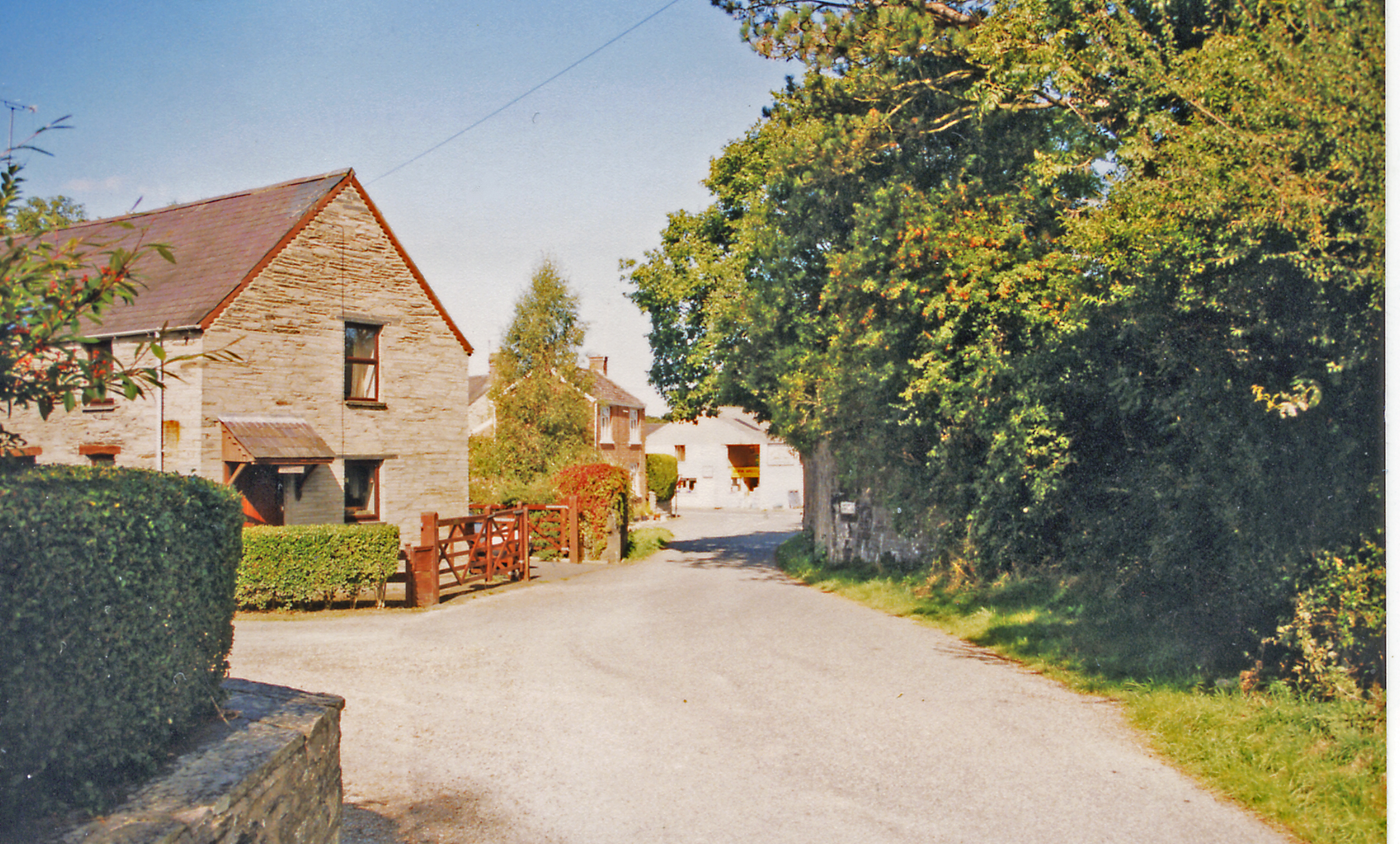
- The site of the station in 1999

General information
- Location: Cilgerran, Pembrokeshire; Wales
- Coordinates: 52.0534°N 4.6237°W
- Grid reference: SN202427
- Platforms: 1

Other information
- Status: Disused

History
- Original company: Whitland and Cardigan Railway
- Pre-grouping: Great Western Railway
- Post-grouping: London, Midland and Scottish Railway; British Railways (Scottish Region)

Key dates
- 31 August 1886: Opened as Kilgerran
- September 1956: Name changed to Kilgerran Halt
- 10 September 1962: Closed to passengers
- 27 May 1963: Closed to goods
Location

Kilgerran Halt railway station served the village of Cilgerran, Pembrokeshire, Wales, from 1886 to 1963 on the Whitland and Cardigan Railway.

== History ==
The station was formally opened on 31 August 1886 by the Whitland and Cardigan Railway. although a day later they were taken over by the Great Western Railway, It was situated on the east side of a minor road. It was going to be called Cilgerran but the GWR preferred the former spelling of the nearby village, Kilgerran. Opposite the platform was a loop with a nearby goods yard, comprising two sidings. It had a stone-built goods shed and a cattle dock. It was downgraded to an unstaffed halt in September 1956, thus the suffix 'Halt' was added to its name. It closed to passengers on 10 September 1962 and closed to goods on 27 May 1963. The goods yard remained open as a non rail connected coal depot until 3 April 1965.

Preceding station	Disused railways	Following station
Cardigan; Line and station closed	Whitland and Cardigan Railway	Boncath; Line and station closed
