= River Taf =

River in West Wales

Coordinates: 51°48′N 4°29′W

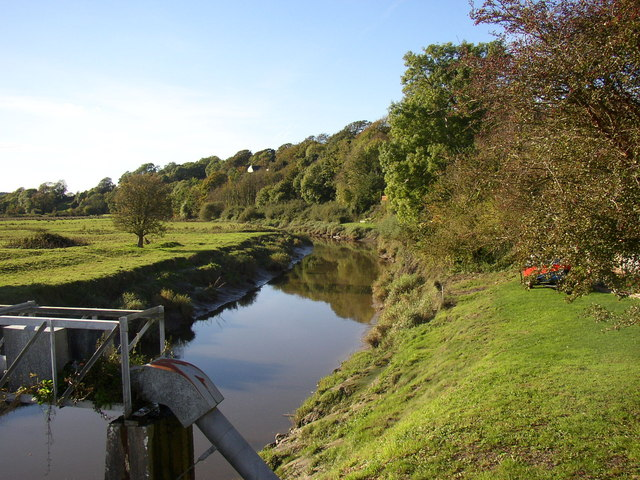

Physical characteristics
- Length: 56 km (35 mi)

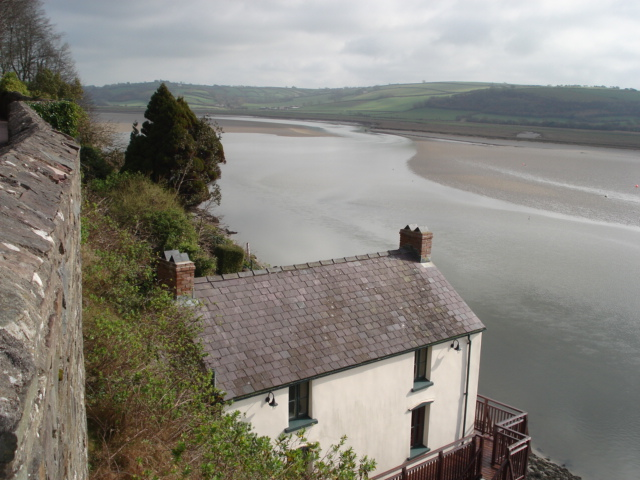
The Dylan Thomas Boathouse at Laugharne and the Taf estuary

The River Taf (Welsh: Afon Taf) is a river in West Wales. It rises in the Preseli Hills, Pembrokeshire, and continues through Carmarthenshire to Laugharne. It is one of the three rivers to enter the sea on the east side of Carmarthen Bay. The other two are the River Gwendraeth and River Tywi.

== Course ==
The River Taf is about 35 miles (56 km) from Crymych to Ginst Point, of which about 9 miles (14 km) is tidal.

Water drains from high ground above the village of Crymych in Pembrokeshire, and at one time flowed at ground level across the main Cardigan–Tenby road (A478) before falling to the level of the Whitland and Cardigan Railway station Crymmych Arms (Great Western Railway) where on the UK Ordnance Survey map of 1866 it is shown as the source of the Taf. The stream fulfills its description "Crymych" (in Welsh "crooked stream") by turning through almost a right angle along the floor of the valley. The stream is mentioned—with various spellings—in records since 1468 and provided both the village and its hostelry with an identity. Modern maps show the source to be 650 feet (200 m) altitude at the foot of Frenni Fawr, close to the defunct railway.

From Crymych the Taf, augmented by numerous minor tributaries, flows ESE to Llanfyrnach; SW through Glandwr, Llanglydwen, Login and Llanfallteg after which it becomes the county boundary between Pembrokeshire and Carmarthenshire, passing several times beneath railway lines. It is joined by the right bank tributary Afon Marlais, and turns east into Carmarthenshire, then runs beneath the A40 road to Whitland; east to St Clears, south to its broad estuary.
