= Crymmych Arms railway station =

Former railway station in Wales

Coordinates: 51.9738°N 4.6444°W

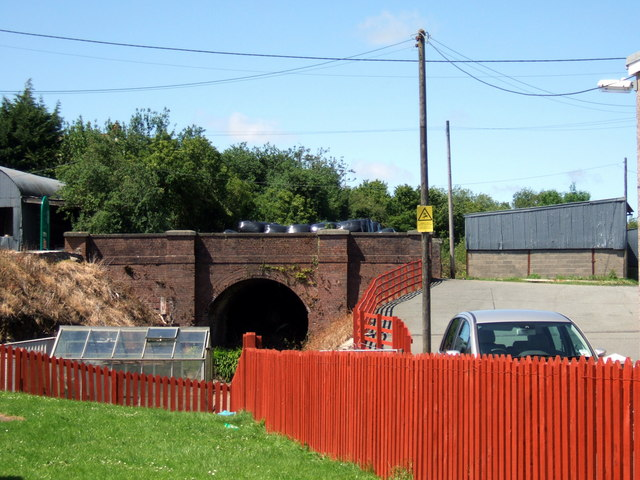
Railway tunnel in Crymych, immediately north of the station site

Crymmych Arms was a railway station in Crymych, Pembrokeshire, West Wales, on the Whitland and Cardigan line. It took its name from a nearby pub which, until the arrival of the railway, was the only building in the area.

== History ==
The Whitland & Cardigan Railway was a 27.5-mile-long (44.3 km) branch railway line in West Wales, between Whitland station on the West Wales Line and Cardigan station, via nine intermediate stations.

The line, which was originally promoted by John Owen (a quarry owner in Glogue) and approved by Parliament under the title of the Whitland and Taf Vale Railway, reached Crymych in July 1874, though passenger service at Crymych did not commence until the following year. In 1877 the name of the line was changed to the Whitland and Cardigan Railway. The extension to Cardigan opened on 1 September 1886 when the line became part of the Great Western Railway. In 1948 part of British Railways.

The proposal to close the line actually came the year before the notorious Beeching Axe, marking a change in a whole way of life and the end of an era. The line was closed to passenger traffic in September 1962, the last train being the 5:45 pm Cardigan Mail. For a while the line remained open to freight traffic, but final closure took place on 27 May 1963. The track was lifted completely by the end of 1964.

The stations at Crymych and Cardigan initially remained open as non-rail connected freight terminals, but this was also short lived. The station building, still in situ as of summer 2026, could become a two-bedroom house.

Preceding station	Disused railways	Following station
Glogue Halt	Great Western Railway; Whitland & Cardigan Railway	Boncath
