= Boncath railway station =

Disused railway station in Boncath, Pembrokeshire

Boncath
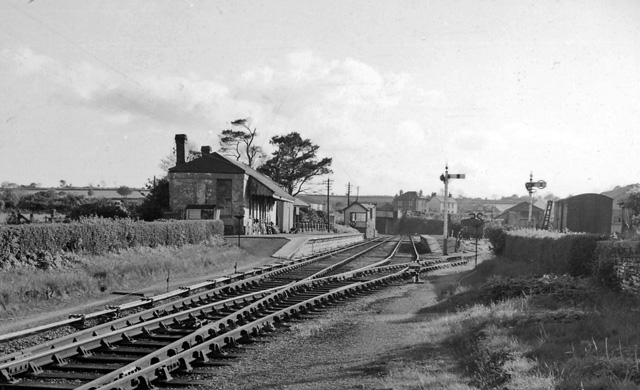
- The station, looking southwest towards Whitland, in 1962

General information
- Location: Boncath, Pembrokeshire; Wales
- Coordinates: 52.0149°N 4.62°W
- Grid reference: SN203384
- Platforms: 2

Other information
- Status: Disused

History
- Original company: Whitland and Cardigan Railway
- Pre-grouping: Great Western Railway
- Post-grouping: Great Western Railway; British Railways (Western Region)

Key dates
- 31 August 1886: Opened
- 10 September 1962: Closed to passengers
- 27 May 1963: Closed to goods
Location

Boncath railway station served the village of Boncath, Pembrokeshire, Wales, from 1886 to 1963 on the Whitland and Cardigan Railway.

== History ==
The station was formally opened on 31 August 1886 by the Whitland and Cardigan Railway although a day later they were taken over the Great Western Railway. It was situated on the west side of a minor road on the B4332. On the up platform were the station master's house, the booking office and the station building. On the south end of the up platform was the signal box, which controlled the level crossing and allowed access to the goods yard, which had three sidings, a stone-built goods shed and a cattle dock. The station closed to passengers on 10 September 1962 and closed to goods on 27 May 1963. The station building survives as do the platforms, albeit in an overgrown state.

Preceding station	Disused railways	Following station
Kilgerran Halt; Line and station closed	Whitland and Cardigan Railway	Crymmych Arms; Line and station closed
