= Glogue =

Village in Pembrokeshire, Wales

Coordinates: 51.9625°N 4.597°W

- Location within Pembrokeshire
- OS grid reference: SN215325
- Community: Crymych
- Principal area: Pembrokeshire
- Preserved county: Dyfed
- Country: Wales
- Sovereign state: United Kingdom
- Post town: GLOGUE
- Postcode district: SA36
- Dialling code: 01239
- Police: Dyfed-Powys
- Fire: Mid and West Wales
- Ambulance: Welsh
- UK Parliament: Preseli Pembrokeshire
- Senedd Cymru – Welsh Parliament: Preseli Pembrokeshire

Glogue (Welsh pronunciation) is a hamlet located 1 mile (1.6 km) north of Llanfyrnach, in the community of Crymych in the east of the county of Pembrokeshire, Wales.

It was the site of slate quarrying from the 18th century; the industry employed over 80 men when the railway came to the area in the 19th century and improved distribution.

Quarrying ended in 1926 and the railway closed in 1962.

Glogue Farm is just north of the settlement, in Clydau community.

== Glogue Quarry ==
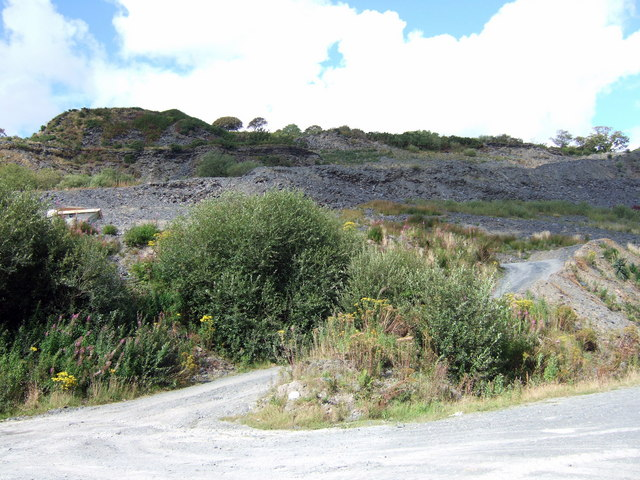
The former Glogue slate quarry

Glogue quarry was a slate quarry in Glogue. Worked from the late 1700s, by the mid-1800s it was owned by John Owen, who wanted to make higher profits by improving his distribution. This led to the construction of the Whitland and Cardigan Railway. The advent of the railway lead to Owen expanding his workforce to over 80 men.

After sale to a local consortium, the quarry was worked until 1926.

== Transport ==
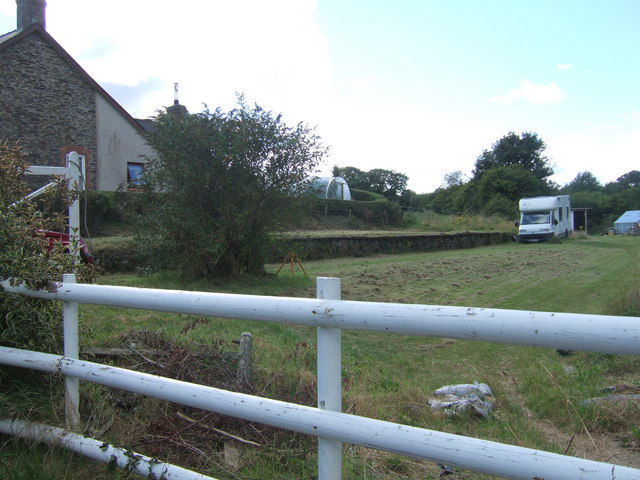
The site of the former Glogue Halt on the Whitland and Cardigan Railway

The railway line was further extended to Crymmych Arms in October 1874, via Glogue Halt. In 1877 the name was changed to the Whitland & Cardigan Railway and the extension to Cardigan opened on 1 September 1886. The Great Western Railway took over the working as of that date and three locomotives were added to stock although the complete undertaking was not purchased until 1890.

The line was noted for its rural nature, with the railway passing through small centres of population, with attractive scenery and over severe gradients. All trains going north stopped at Glogue to take on water, before attempting the climb to Crymych and beyond to the summit towards Boncath. For many in the area, the line was the focus of the local community, gaining the nickname the Cardi Bach.

The line was closed to passenger traffic on 8 September 1962, the last train being the 5.45pm Cardigan Mail.

Preceding station	Historical railways	Following station
Llanfyrnach	Great Western Railway; Whitland & Cardigan Railway	Crymych
