= Afon Marlais, Pembrokeshire =

Tributary of the River Taf in Wales

Afon Marlais
- Location within Wales
- Etymology: Welsh 'marw glais', meaning 'stagnant stream'

Location
- Country: Wales
- County: Pembrokeshire

Physical characteristics
- Source
  - location: Near Blaenmarlais
  - coordinates: 51.8112°N 4.7407°W
- Mouth: River Taf
  - location: West of Whitland
  - coordinates: 51.8203°N 4.6338°W
- Length: 10 km (6.2 mi)

Basin features
- Tributaries
  - right: Afon Cwm
- Bridges: Pant-y-Gorphwys and Pont Fadog

Afon Marlais is a right-bank tributary of the River Taf in Pembrokeshire, West Wales. It flows through the Vale of Lampeter to join the Taf just west of Whitland. Its length is approximately 10 kilometres (6.2 mi). The name derives from the Welsh 'marw glais' and signifies a 'stagnant stream'.

== Course ==
An indication of the source of the river comes from Ordnance Survey maps which show, a short distance east of Redstone Cross (a junction of the A40 and the B4313 roads), a place called Blaenmarlais in the community of Narberth at 51.8112°N 4.7407°W. In its first kilometre, the Marlais, flowing in a roughly easterly direction, then southeasterly, is joined by an unnamed left bank tributary before running under the A478 at Pant-y-gorphwys, then another left bank tributary and two right bank tributaries before turning east, then northeast meandering along Lampeter Vale where it is joined by numerous further tributaries, to pass under the A40 again at Pont Fadog. Approximately 500m further, it joins the Taf at 51.8203°N 4.6338°W. For all of its length after Pant-y-gorphwys, the river marks the boundary between the communities of Lampeter Velfrey and Llanddewi Velfrey in Pembrokeshire. Ordnance Survey names one of the tributaries (right bank) as Afon Cwm at 51.810°N 4.662°W.

== Geology ==
In the catchment area limestones of Llandeilo age are common. Gold grains have been found in the river, the angular nature of some suggesting a local source.

== Bridges ==
Pant-y-Gorphwys and its bridge, and Pont Fadog, are Royal Commission recorded historic place names.

== Buildings ==
A mill labelled as White Mill (Flour) is shown on a 1907 map and current Ordnance Survey maps at 51.8048°N 4.7006°W.
