= T. E. Nicholas =

Welsh poet, preacher and political activist

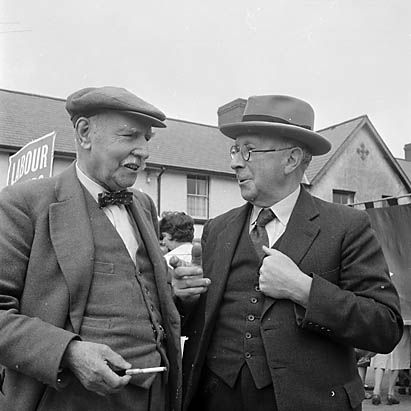
- T. E. Nicholas (left) and D. J. Williams conversing at a CND rally at Aberystwyth, 1961. Photograph by Geoff Charles
- Born: Thomas Evan Nicholas; 6 October 1879; Llanfyrnach, Pembrokeshire, Wales
- Died: 19 April 1971 (aged 91); Aberystwyth, Cardiganshire, Wales
- Resting place: Ashes scattered on the Preseli Hills, Pembrokeshire, Wales
- Other name: "Niclas y Glais" ('Nicholas of Glais')
- Education: Hermon School, Gwynfryn Academy
- Occupations: Preacher, lecturer, dentist and poet
- Notable work: 'Canu'r Carchar'
- Spouse: Mary Alys Hopkins
- Children: Thomas Islwyn Nicholas (1903–1980) Gwladys Thelma Williams (1904–1938) Nellie Alys Nicholas (1911–1991)
- Parent(s): David and Elizabeth Nicholas

Thomas Evan Nicholas (6 October 1879 – 19 April 1971), who used the bardic name Niclas y Glais (Welsh for 'Nicholas of Glais''), was a Welsh language poet, preacher, radical, and champion of the disadvantaged of society.

== Early life ==
Nicholas was born at Blaunwaun Felen in Llanfyrnach parish, Pembrokeshire, Wales, the fifth child of David (a small farmer and stonemason) and Elizabeth Nicholas. Before he was one year old, the family moved to 'Y Llety', Pentre Galar, a 57-acre smallholding on the slopes of Foel Dyrch in the Preseli Hills, Pembrokeshire, where Nicholas was brought up. "Times were hard. There were 6 children in the family, and Y Llety was a rented smallholding."

Nicholas's early upbringing was a deep and long-lasting influence on him: "It is often argued that the community of the Preseli Hills represented the socialist ideal for Niclas – a community where people co-operated for each other’s good. It was a civilized society where ideas, stories, debates, sermons and politics were shared. There was a great deal of sharing of books and journals, too. Niclas was introduced to what was happening in Parliament by the newspaper Baner ac Amserau Cymru published by Thomas Gee."

== Training for the ministry and ordination ==
Nicholas left Pembrokeshire in 1897 and worked briefly in Treherbert in the Rhondda, before studying for the ministry at the Gwynfryn Academy (Ysgol y Gwynfryn), Ammanford, under Watcyn Wyn (Watkin Hezekiah Williams) and John Gwili Jenkins. In 1901 he was ordained to the ministry among the Welsh Independents at Horeb Chapel, Llandeilo, in Carmarthenshire.

== Marriage and family ==
In 1902, Nicholas married Mary Alys Hopkins, daughter of Thomas Hopkins, watchmaker, Ammanford. Their children included a son, Thomas Islwyn Nicholas (Islwyn ap Nicholas) (b. 1903) and two daughters, Gwladys Thelma (b. 1904) and Nellie Alys (b. 1911).

== Seion Chapel, Glais: ministry and writing ==
In 1903, he was briefly minister of the Welsh Congregational Church at Dodgeville, Wisconsin, U.S.A.

Between 1904 and 1914 he was minister of Seion Chapel in the village of Glais in the Swansea Valley, where Nicholas Road bears his name.

His religious convictions, influenced by Watcyn Wyn and Gwili, were focused on the radical message of the Gospels. He supported the socialism of R. J. Derfel with its emphasis on brotherhood, peace and justice, equality, land nationalisation, and a Parliament for Wales, and opposition to the royal family, the brewers and militarism. Nicholas became a favorite preacher at 'Cyrddau Mawr' ('Big Meetings') and a popular public speaker.

In his own chapel at Glais he supported Welsh culture, establishing a choir and an eisteddfod. He was a prolific poet: his early poetry had religious themes but by 1908 his poems carried a socialist and radical message. He was known as 'The People's Poet'. He won over 17 eisteddfod chairs during his time at Glais. The main themes of his poetry were injustice, the battle between the working class and the power of capital, and pacifism. His poetry books and pamphlets – almost all written in Welsh – sold well: Weithwyr Cymru, Cenwch eich hunain i ryddid ('Workers of Wales, sing yourselves to freedom') sold over 6000 copies. He also translated The Internationale and The Red Flag into Welsh.

== Political, trade union and anti-war activities ==
Nicholas joined the Independent Labour Party in 1905. He was a close friend and supporter of James Keir Hardie, the founder of the Independent Labour Party – Hardie had been elected as M.P. for the Welsh mining constituency of Merthyr Tydfil from 1900. Like Hardie, Nicholas was both a Christian socialist and a committed pacifist. Nicholas acted as Hardie's election agent in 1910 and, at Hardie's request, Nicholas served as the first Welsh-language editor of the ILP's Merthyr Pioneer from its first appearance in 1911.

In January 1914 Nicholas left Glais to become Minister to two chapels in rural Ceredigion: Ebenezer, Llangybi, and Bethlehem, Llanddewi Brefi.

When the First World War broke out, Hardie and Nicholas both opposed it. Within a few days of Britain going into the war Hardie was speaking against it in his own constituency but was shouted down by the crowd, who supported the war. Hardie died on 26 September 1915, aged only 59. Nicholas delivered the sermon at Hardie's memorial service at Aberdare. He continued to oppose the War throughout its duration. The authorities took an interest in his activities and sought evidence of treason.

In the General Election of 1918, Nicholas was invited by the Labour Party to stand in the Aberdare division of Hardie's old Merthyr Tydfil seat, against Charles Butt Stanton (1873–1946). Stanton had won one of the two Merthyr Tydfil seats in the by-election caused by Hardie's death: he had supported the Coalition Government and the war; and fought the General Election as a member of the National Democratic Party (NDP) with the assistance of the Coalition 'coupon'. Nicholas campaigned on Hardie's socialist and pacifist positions. He was badly mistreated. He won 6,229 votes to Stanton's 22,824. However, he was heartened by the fact that the Labour Party greatly increased its vote share nationally (from 7% to 21%) and for the first time it won the most seats in Wales, breaking the long Liberal dominance. Nicholas took heart also from the Russian Revolution.

In Ceredigion Nicholas organised farmworkers into a Union and in 1918 he established the Labour Party in the county. He resigned from the ministry in the same year. He and his wife and son, Islwyn ap Nicholas, set up a dental practice – first in Pontardawe and then, in 1921, in Aberystwyth. (They were trained as dentists by a good friend, David Ernest Evans (1870–1956) of Mountain Ash).

In 1920, Nicholas joined the Communist Party of Great Britain when it was first formed. He was expelled from the Labour Party in 1926 after criticising Ramsay MacDonald's leadership. He continued as an active and popular lecturer, preacher, writer, columnist and poet. In the 1930s he wrote a weekly column, 'O fyd y werin' ('The world of the people') in Y Cymro newspaper.

== The Prison Sonnets ==
In July 1940, during the Second World War, he and his son Islwyn were arrested on a trumped up charge of fascism. They were imprisoned first in Swansea prison and then in Brixton, where Nicholas wrote 150 sonnets expressing his Christian and communist convictions. Protests against their imprisonment came from Ministers of religion, trade union leaders, especially the miners, and Members of Parliament. After four months in prison, they were released.

Nicholas's prison sonnets (many written on toilet paper) were published in Llygad y Drws: Sonedau’r Carchar (Aberystwyth, 1940) and Canu’r Carchar (Llandysul, 1942): they were translated into English by Daniel Hughes, Dewi Emrys and Wil Ifan as The Prison Sonnets of T. E. Nicholas (London, 1948). Llygad y Drws ("The Eye of the Door") refers to the eye-hole in the prison cell door.

The National Library of Wales, which holds the manuscript of his prison poems, has placed them online (with an introduction).

== Death and legacy ==
T. E. Nicholas died at home in Aberystwyth on 19 April 1971, aged 91. The funeral services were held at the Independent Chapel, Aberystwyth and Narberth Crematorium. His ashes were scattered on the Preseli Hills, Pembrokeshire. His papers are held in the T. E. Nicholas Archive at Bangor University.

== Published works ==
=== Poetry ===
- Salmau'r Werin ('The Psalms of the People') First edition (Ystalyfera, 1909), Second edition (Wrecsam, 1913)
- Cerddi Gwerin ('Songs for the People') (Caernarfon, 1912)
- Cyflog Byw ('A Living Wage') (Pontardawe, 1913)
- Cerddi Rhyddid ('Songs of Freedom') (Abertawe, 1914)
- Nadolig Arall ('Another Christmas') (Llangybi, 1915)
- Dros Eich Gwlad: Cerddi Heddwch ('For Your Country: Songs of Peace') (edited by D. Ernest Williams) First edition, 128 pp (Pontardawe, 1920), Further edition (1930)
- Y Gân Ni Chanwyd ('The Song not Sung') First edition (Aberystwyth, 1929), Further edition (Aberystwyth, 1954)
- Weithwyr Cymru, Cenwch eich hunain i ryddid ('Workers of Wales – Sing Yourselves to Freedom') (Aberystwyth, 1938)
- Terfysgoedd Daear ('The World's Tempests') (1939)
- Sonedau'r Carchar ('Prison Sonnets') (Aberystwyth, 1940) – also known as:
- Llygad y Drws: Sonedau'r Carchar ('Eye of the Door: Prison Sonnets') (introduction by D. Gwenallt Jones) 128 pp, First edition (Aberystwyth, 1940), Further editions (Aberystwyth, 1940 and 1941)
- Canu'r Carchar. Ysgrifennwyd yng ngharcharau Abertawe a Brixton. (Ail gyfres). ('Prison Poems. Written in Swansea and Brixton Prisons. Second Series') 53 pp. First edition (Llandysul, 1942), Further edition (Llandysul, 1943)
- Y Dyn a'r Gaib ('The man with the hoe') (Dinbych, 1944)
- The Prison Sonnets of T. E. Nicholas (translated from the Welsh by Daniel Hughes, Dewi Emrys (David James), Wil Ifan (William Evans), and Eric Davies) (London, 1948)
- Dryllio'r Delwau ('Destroying the Idols'): Rhagair gan Idwal Jones (Preface by Idwal Jones) ix, 72 pp (Towyn, 1948 / 1949)
- Meirionnydd ('Merionethshire') First edition (Llandysul, 1949), Second edition (Llandysul, 1950)
- Rwy'n Gweld o Bell ('I see from afar') (Abertawe, Undeb yr Annibynwyr Cymraeg, 1963)
- Tros ryddid daear: casgliad o gerddi gwleidyddol ('For World Freedom': a posthumous collection of the Welsh political poems of T. E. Nicholas, with English prose translations) (Aberpennar / Mountain Ash: Llyfrau Niclas Books, 1981)

=== Other writings ===
- Dros Eich Gwlad: Llythr Agored at Mr D. J. Davies, Llundain, ar y Rhyfel Anghyfiawn ('For Your Country: An Open Letter to Mr D.J. Davies, London, on the Unjust War') First edition (Llangybi, 1915) (10 pp), Second edition (Abertawe, 1915) (18 pp), Third edition (1915) (14 pp). T. E. Nicholas's pamphlet opposing WW1, originally published in the Labour Pioneer of 8 Jan 1915.

Articles by T. E. Nicholas republished in the Hyddgen Series, by the Gwenffrwd Press:

- Gornest cyfalaf a llafur ('The Conflict of capital and labour') Gwasg Gwenffrwd, 1970 (Article on the 1912 South Wales Miner's Strike): from Y Geninen Vol 30(2) (1912) pp 123–7
- R. J. Derfel Gwasg Gwenffrwd, 1970 (Article on the life and poetry of the early Welsh Socialist, Robert Jones Derfel (1824–1905): from Ceninen Gwyl Dewi (1912) pp 23–4)

== Sources and external links ==
=== Online biographies ===
- Welsh Biography Online 'NICHOLAS, THOMAS EVAN (‘Niclas y Glais ’), (1879–1971)' by Dr D. Ben Rees (2011). This excellent biography has a valuable list of additional sources. The Welsh language version is at Y Bywgraffiadur Cymreig
- Ivor Rees, 'Thomas Evan Nicholas, 1879 – 1971', The National Library of Wales Journal, Vol 35, No 1 (2010); Cylchgrawn Llyfrgell Genedlaethol Cymru, Cyfrol 35, Rhif 1 (2010). Another excellent biography, with a valuable reference list. Online at: N.L.W. Jnl., 35 (2010)
- Nicholas of Glais:The People's Champion Biography by David H Howell, Clydach Historical Society,1991, Booklet, 49 pp; together with English translations of 7 of the prison sonnets. Also online in the 'People' section of The Ammanford Town website
- T. E. Nicholas (Niclas y Glais) in the National Library of Wales's "Digital Gallery" (a collection of 20 biographies of individuals with a special place in the history of Wales during the period 1939–1959) – contains a good outline biography linked to photographs from the Library's image collection; accessed 25 August 2017

=== Other online sources ===
- 'Canu'r carchar': Prison Sonnets of T. E. Nicholas – NLW MS 13692A, the manuscript of T. E. Nicholas's prison poems, with an introduction by the National Library of Wales
- BBC Wales by Guto Thomas, 1 March 2005: on documents released by the U.K. National Archives concerning T. E. Nicholas, including his arrest and imprisonment in 1940.
- UK National Archives National Archives summary of Freedom of Information releases, March 2005, of files held on Thomas Evans Nicholas (KV 2/1750-1752) and his son Thomas Islwyn Nicholas (KV 2/1822-1823): web page included for permanent preservation in the UK Government Web Archive, and accessed on 22 May 2017
- Capel Seion, Glais, Ynysymond, Glamorgan John Ball's photographs of Seion Chapel, Glais, with a brief history of the chapel, can be accessed from his home page.

=== Full-length biography (in Welsh) ===
- Hefin Wyn, Ar Drywydd Niclas y Glais – Comiwnydd Rhonc a Christion Gloyw (Y Lolfa) ISBN 9781784614140. First full-length biography. Shortlisted for the 2018 Welsh Language Non-Fiction Book of the Year Award.
  - Reviewed by Gwyn Griffiths, Morning Star, 9 January 2018: English language version and Welsh language version, with additional information on some of Nicholas's Communist fellow-workers, including Idris Cox.

=== Political history ===
Dylan Morris, T. E. Nicholas and the Welsh Communist Tradition (1999, Welsh Academic Press) ISBN 9781860570094

=== Additional articles ===
- S Howys, 'Hir Oes i Ysbryd Niclas', Barn, 365 (June / Mehefin 1993), p. 35 (Welsh language)
- David A. Pretty, 'Gwrthryfel y Gweithwyr Gwledig yng Ngheredigion, 1889–1950' (The Revolt of the Agricultural Workers in Ceredigion, 1889–1950), Ceredigion, Vol 11, No 1 (1988/1989), pp. 41–57 (Welsh language)
- G. Jones, 'In Search of Niclas y Glais', New Welsh Review, Vol 56 (2002), pp 69–70.
- Chríost D.M.G. (2013) 'T. E. Nicholas Llygad y Drws (1940), Canu’r Carchar (1942) and Prison Sonnets (1948)'. In: Welsh Writing, Political Action and Incarceration. Palgrave Studies in Minority Languages and Communities. Palgrave Macmillan, London. Print ISBN 978-1-349-34870-1; Online ISBN 978-1-137-37227-7
- 'The worlds of T. E. Nicholas', Morning Star, 11 August 2018: edited version of the T. E. Nicholas Memorial Lecture delivered at the Cardiff National Eisteddfod 2018 by Robert Griffiths, General Secretary of the Communist Party of Britain (retrieved 4 Mar 2019)

=== Film ===
- Gwlad Beirdd – Niclas y Glais ('Land of Poets – Nicholas of Glais') (Welsh language) Mererid Hopwood, Tudur Dylan Jones and Sian Howys, with clips of Nicholas himself and an interview with his nephew, Glen George – from a film series on Welsh poets broadcast by S4C: here with an outline biography in English, by D. Ben Rees, and a valuable bibliography; accessed 25 August 2017
