= Merthyr Pioneer =

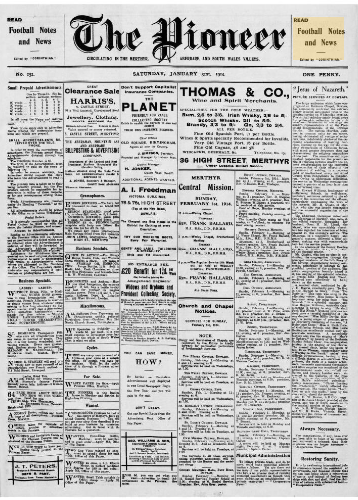
- Cover from 31 January 1914
- Type: Weekly newspaper
- Founder(s): Keir Hardie
- Editor: Thomas Evan Nicholas
- Founded: 1911
- Political alignment: Socialist
- Ceased publication: 1922
- City: Merthyr Tydfil
- Country: Wales

The Merthyr Pioneer was a weekly Socialist newspaper founded by Keir Hardie that was published in Merthyr Tydfil, Wales, from 1911 to 1922. The newspaper was a successful local paper, and also served as a vehicle for communicating Hardie's political opinions.

== History ==
The weekly Merthyr Pioneer was launched by Keir Hardie in 1911 with Thomas Evan Nicholas (Niclas y Glais) as its Welsh editor. Nicholas was a socialist bard and an Independent minister. The paper was associated with the Independent Labour Party (ILP), and helped promote Hardie as ILP member of parliament for Merthyr Tydfil. Christopher Murray Grieve, better known as Hugh MacDiarmid, used to write for the paper. The suffragette leader Sylvia Pankhurst wrote a weekly article for the paper signed with the initial S. Mark Starr taught a series of course on Industrial History based on Marxist economics that were the basis of a series in the Pioneer and were reprinted as A Worker Looks at History by the Plebs' League in November 1917.

The paper was successful as a local newspaper, while also advancing political ideas. It ceased publication in 1922.

== Viewpoints ==
Hardie was in favour of socialism, equality, public ownership of land, and a Welsh parliament. He was against the monarchy, brewers and militarism. The paper was strongly biased in favour of the Welsh language. Hardie argued strongly in the paper for a decentralised, devolved type of socialism based on local communities as opposed to the centralised German system. In April 1914 Hardie wrote in the Pioneer of establishing a union or commonwealth of the English-speaking nations.

Although Hardie was opposed to fighting in World War I (1914–18) he avoided criticising the volunteer soldiers. As he wrote in his weekly column of the Pioneer, "The lads who have gone forth by sea and land to fight their country's battles must not be disheartened by a discordant note at home." After Hardie's death in 1915 George Bernard Shaw wrote a tribute to him in the Merthyr Pioneer titled "Keir Hardie the Patriot" in which he refuted attacks on Hardie's patriotism. Emrys Hughes, secretary of the No Conscription Fellowship in the Rhondda, covered military tribunals for the Merthyr Pioneer. He refused to accept conscription, was arrested in the spring of 1916 and imprisoned until 1919.

== Sources ==
- Bellamy, Joyce M.; Martin, David E.; Saville, John (25 November 1993), Dictionary of Labour Biography, Palgrave Macmillan UK, ISBN 978-1-349-07845-5
- Bold, Alan Norman (1988), MacDiarmid: Christopher Murray Grieve, a Critical Biography, University of Massachusetts Press, ISBN 978-0-87023-714-0
- Clarke, Charles; James, Toby (8 August 2015), British Labour Leaders, Biteback Publishing, ISBN 978-1-84954-967-7
- Holman, Bob (8 October 2012), Keir Hardie, Lion Books, ISBN 978-0-7459-5730-2
- Lane, A. T. (1995), "HUGHES, Emrys Daniel", Biographical Dictionary of European Labor Leaders, Greenwood Publishing Group, ISBN 978-0-313-26456-6
- Leydier, Gilles (26 March 2009), Scotland and Europe, Scotland in Europe, Cambridge Scholars Publishing, ISBN 978-1-4438-0704-3
- Pankhurst, E. Sylvia (16 April 2013), The Suffragette Movement - An Intimate Account Of Persons And Ideals, Read Books Limited, ISBN 978-1-4474-9859-9
- Pennell, Catriona (1 March 2012), A Kingdom United: Popular Responses to the Outbreak of the First World War in Britain and Ireland, OUP Oxford, ISBN 978-0-19-959058-2
- "Pioneer", Welsh Newspapers Online, National Library of Wales, archived from the original on 13 March 2016
- Tanner, Duncan (13 February 2003), Political Change and the Labour Party 1900–1918, Cambridge University Press, ISBN 978-0-521-53053-8
