= Crymych =

Village and community in Pembrokeshire, Wales

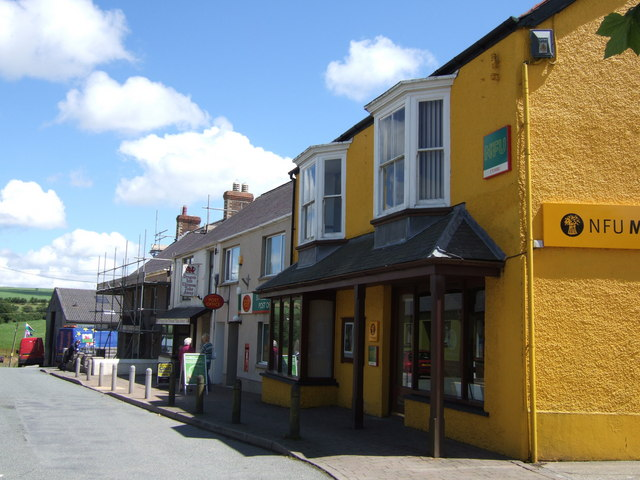
- Station Road, Crymych

- Location within Pembrokeshire
- Population: 1,739 (2011)
- OS grid reference: SN182337
- Community: Crymych
- Principal area: Pembrokeshire
- Preserved county: Dyfed
- Country: Wales
- Sovereign state: United Kingdom
- Post town: WHITLAND
- Postcode district: SA34
- Post town: GLOGUE
- Postcode district: SA36
- Post town: CRYMYCH
- Postcode district: SA41
- Dialling code: 01239
- Police: Dyfed-Powys
- Fire: Mid and West Wales
- Ambulance: Welsh
- UK Parliament: Preseli Pembrokeshire
- Senedd Cymru – Welsh Parliament: Ceredigion Penfro
- List of places UK Wales Pembrokeshire 51.972°N 4.648°W Map of the community

Crymych (Welsh pronunciation) is a village of around 800 inhabitants and a community (population 1,739) in the northeast of Pembrokeshire, Wales. It is situated approximately 800 feet (240 m) above sea level at the eastern end of the Preseli Mountains, on the old Tenby to Cardigan turnpike road, now the A478.

The village developed around the former Crymmych Arms railway station on the now-closed Whitland to Cardigan Railway, nicknamed Cardi Bach (Little Cardi).

Crymych, which is twinned with Plomelin in Brittany, has an elected community council. The village has given its name to an electoral ward of Pembrokeshire that encompasses the villages of Crymych itself and Eglwyswrw. The community includes Hermon, Glandwr, Glogue and Llanfyrnach.

== History ==
The name Crymych translates into English as crooked stream referring to the River Taf which rises in the high ground above the village and takes a sharp turn in the valley at the north end of the village.

Evidence of prehistoric occupation in the community is the Megalithic burial mound known as Crymych Wayside Barrow.

First mentioned in an account of the Cemais Hundreds of 1468, Crymych has for centuries been an area of livestock farming.

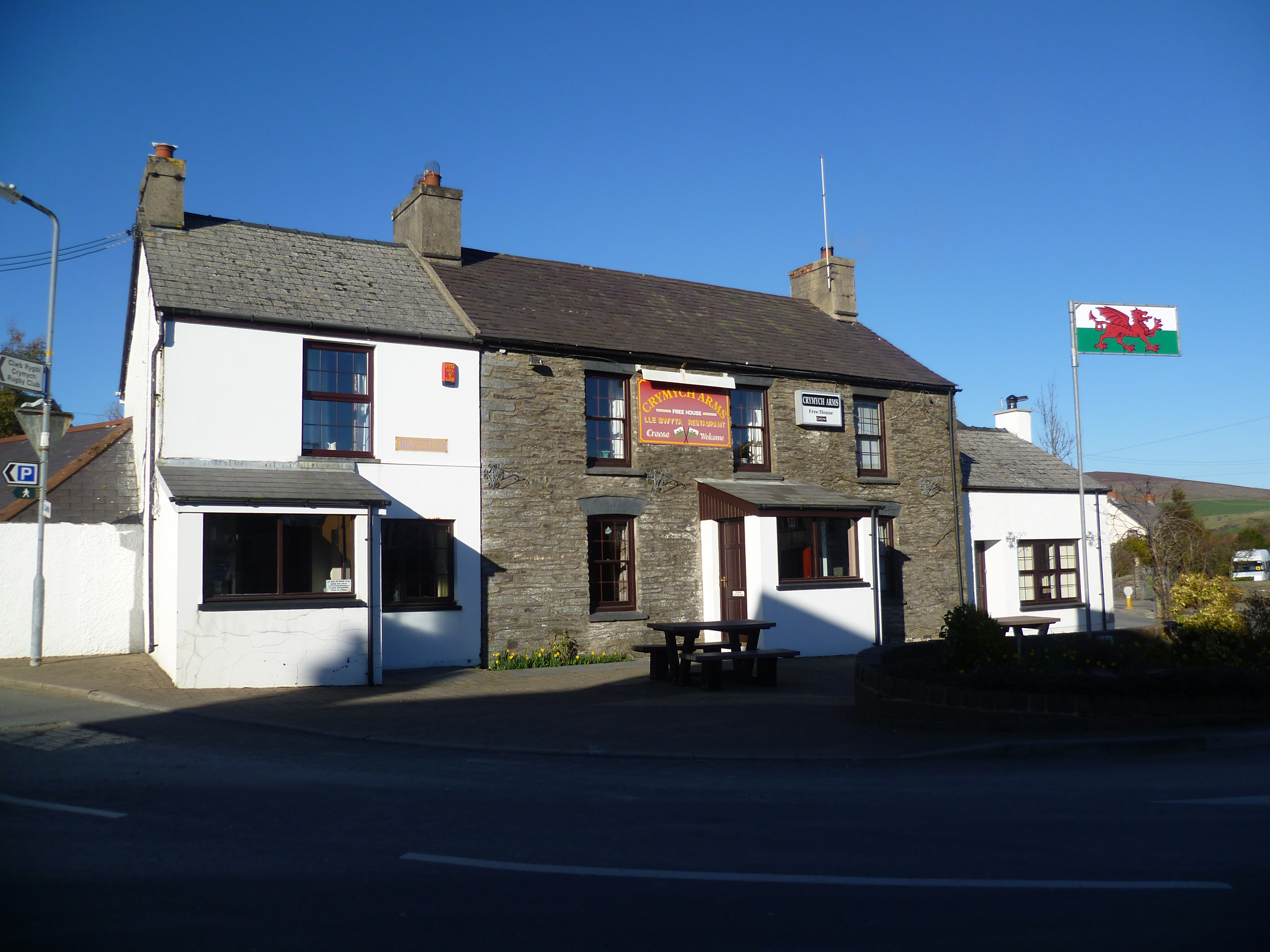
Crymych Arms

Other than the Crymych Arms public house, which dates from at least 1861 but possibly as early as 1812, little existed at the spot before the extension of the Whitland and Taf Vale Railway to Crymych in 1874. The community then grew rapidly as a service and transport centre for the surrounding uplands, and acquired a reputation as the "Wild West of West Wales', reflected in the tongue-in-cheek appellation of Cowbois Crymych by which residents are sometimes known.

The village was sometimes referred to as Crymmych Arms, after the name of the station, for example in a report of an Eisteddfod in 1876.

The agricultural show was first held in 1909, and was equally successful in subsequent years. A regional livestock market existed in the village for many years; a new purpose-built site was developed north of the village, also accommodating a number of other traders.

Crymych War Memorial, which covers Eglwyswrw, Blaenffos, Llanfyrnach, Hermon and Glogue, records the names of 50 people who lost their lives in World War I and 17 in World War II.

Crymych Market Hall was opened in 1919; its present capacity is 500 (standing) or 250 (seated). It was built as a result of the formation of the Market Hall Company Ltd in 1911. During World War II it functioned as an evacuee centre, a shooting range for the Home Guard and a social centre for American troops stationed locally while they trained in the Preseli Mountains. In 1944 two Cardigan schoolboys were killed near Crymych by unexploded ordnance.

It was announced in July 2023 that the Crymych Arms, which had been closed for 18 months, was to be reopened following a community grant of £210,000 from the UK government.

== Education ==
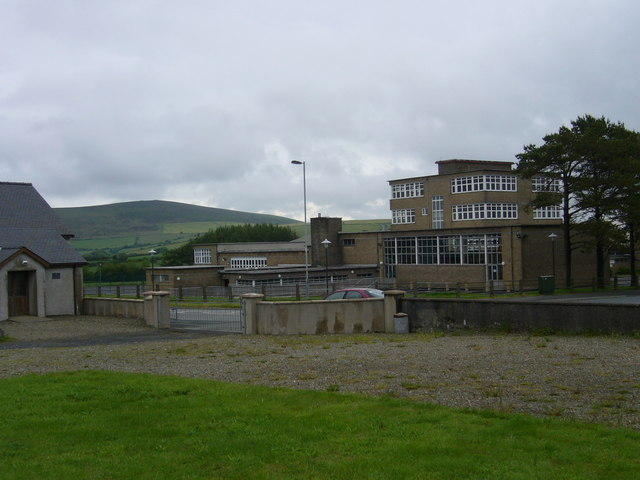
Ysgol y Preseli

Crymych's status as "capital" of the Preselau was confirmed in 1958, when Ysgol y Preseli, a secondary school covering a wide district, was opened. In 1996, the school became Pembrokeshire's first Welsh-medium comprehensive school, and the number of pupils on its roll has doubled since its launch. In spite of a large influx of English immigrants to the area since the 1970s, Crymych retains a strong identity based on the Welsh language and Welsh culture.

Ysgol y Preseli has about 1,000 pupils. The school had a GCSE pass rate (based on 5 GCSEs, grades A-C) of 72% in 2002, according to Estyn. The corresponding figure in 2000 was 75%, which put it in 7th place in the country. It is consistently in the top 10% of secondary schools in Wales. It is also the best performing secondary school in Pembrokeshire.

== Worship ==
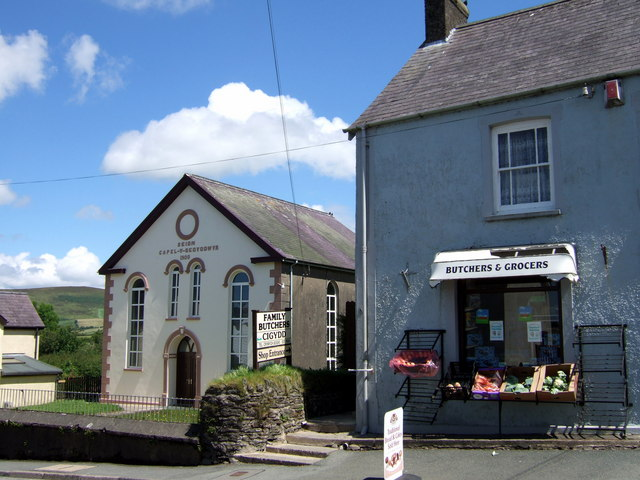
Chapel and butcher's (the latter now closed) in 2007

Crymych stands at the meeting point of three (formerly Anglican) parishes: Llanfair-Nant-Gwyn to the north, Penrydd to the east and Llanfyrnach to the south. Of these, only Llanfyrnach parish (now Church in Wales) remains active.

The two chapels in the village are Antioch Welsh Independent Chapel, built in 1845 and restored in 1874 and 1927, and Seion Welsh Baptist Church, built in 1900.

== Culture ==
Crymych and District Choir performs locally, nationally and internationally. Bois y Frenni is another local choir whose history dates from World War II. There is a thriving and successful youth activity group in Aelwyd Crymych whose activities range across the whole spectrum of the arts. Crymych is twinned with Plomelin in Brittany.

== Sport ==
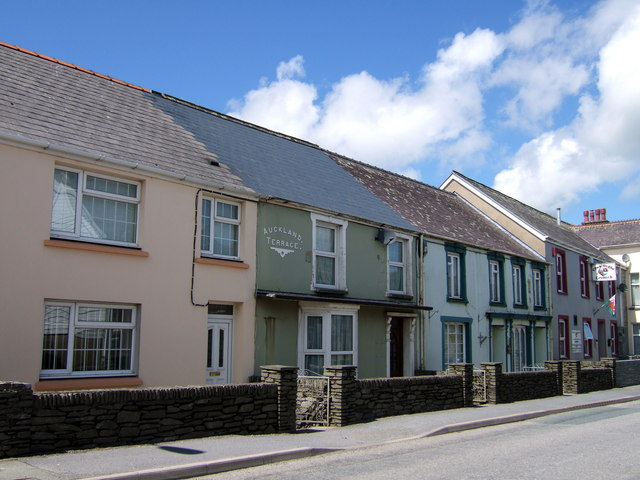
Terrace in the main street (2007). The Rugby Club is on the right.

Crymych is home to Crymych RFC, a rugby union team formed in 1984 and a cricket club which fields sides in the third and sixth divisions of the Pembrokeshire Cricket League. "Ras Frenni" running road race (over 4 and 8 miles) was held for the 23rd time in July 2014.

Crymych also has a football club, Crymych F.C., which was formed in 2019.

== Notable people ==
- Daniel John Davies (1885–1970), an Independent minister and Welsh language poet from Pentre Galar
- Claire Jones (born 1985), a Welsh harpist and Official Harpist to the Prince of Wales from 2007 to 2011
- Rhodri Davies (born 1991), a Welsh rugby union player, scrum-half for the Dragons RFC
- Garan and Ioan Croft (born 2001), amateur boxers, reside in the village

== Other amenities ==
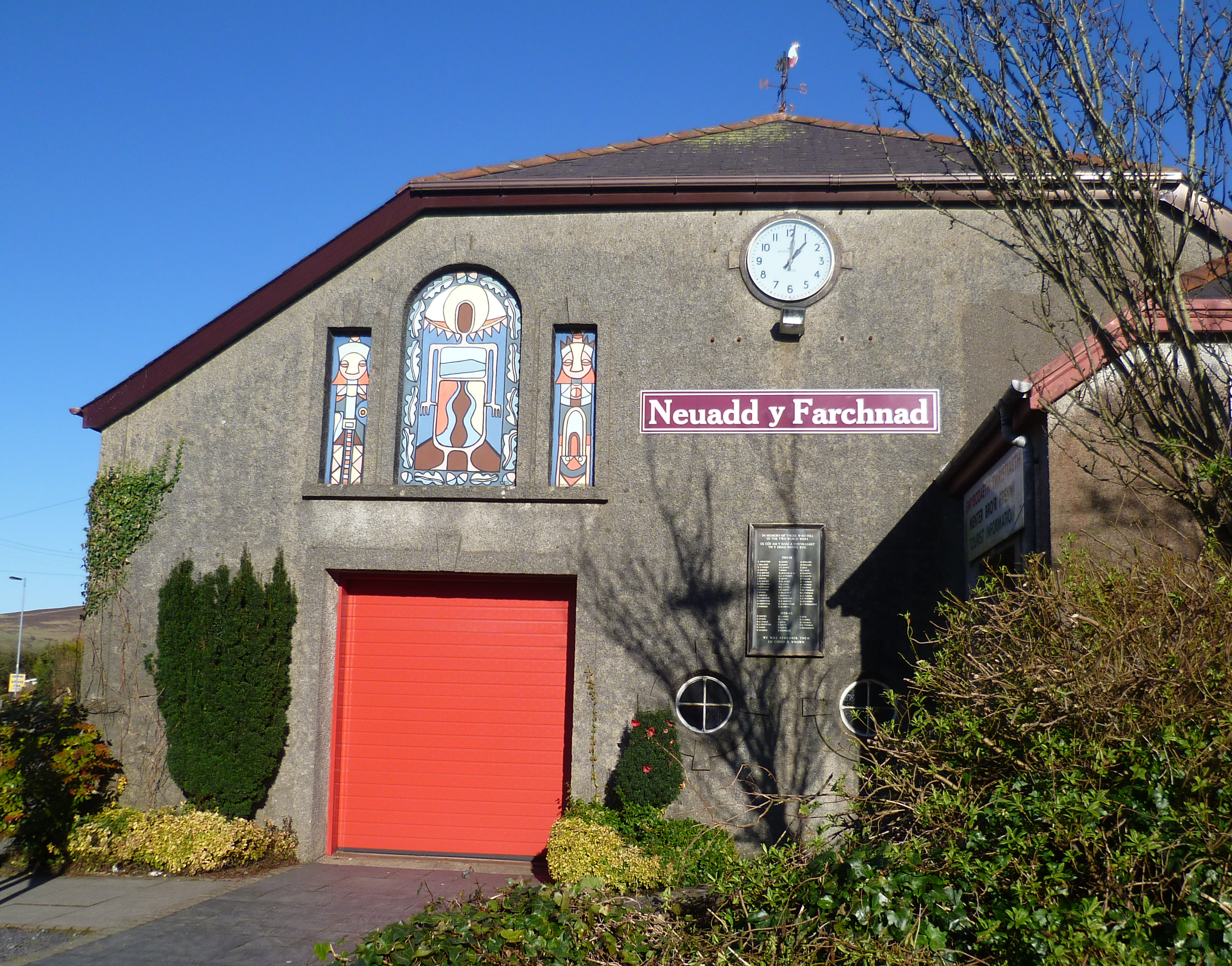
Crymych Market Hall

Aside from the livestock market, Crymych has a veterinary practice, fire and police stations, doctor's surgery, pharmacy, petrol station, post office and numerous other businesses, shops and trade premises.

Crymych Market Hall is used regularly for concerts, eisteddfodau, meetings, fairs and auctions.

A major redevelopment of the former market site, Bro Preseli, was completed in 2014 and includes accommodation for the elderly, a medical centre and a day centre serving the wider community. The complex is a joint venture between Pembrokeshire County Council, Hywel Dda Local Health Board and Family Housing Association Wales.

Since the closure of Crymych's railway station to passengers in 1962, and freight the following year, the nearest station has been at Clunderwen, 10 miles (16 km) to the south. There are bus services to destinations in Pembrokeshire, Ceredigion and Carmarthenshire.

== Nearby settlements and structures ==
There are 15 listed structures in Crymych community, including several places of worship.

To the southeast of Crymych, near the hamlet of Glandwr, is Lammas Ecovillage, a low-impact housing development. Other nearby settlements are Eglwyswen, Hermon, Pentre Galar and Hebron.

The Preseli TV and radio transmitting station is about 1.8 miles (3 km) SSW of Crymych. The mast, being 235 metres (771 ft) tall and on land which is 320 metres (1,050 ft) above sea level, is visible from a long distance away on a clear day.

== See also ==
- Crymych (electoral ward)

Preceding station	Historical railways	Following station
Glogue	Great Western Railway; Whitland & Cardigan Railway	Boncath
