= Hermon, Pembrokeshire =

Village in Pembrokeshire, Wales

Coordinates: 51.957°N 4.605°W

Hermon: Welsh: hermon
- Location within Pembrokeshire
- Population: 312
- OS grid reference: SN2108531908
- Community: Crymych
- Principal area: Pembrokeshire
- Preserved county: Dyfed
- Country: Wales
- Sovereign state: United Kingdom
- Post town: Glogue
- Postcode district: SA36
- Dialling code: 01239
- Police: Dyfed-Powys
- Fire: Mid and West Wales
- Ambulance: Welsh
- UK Parliament: Preseli Pembrokeshire
- Senedd Cymru – Welsh Parliament: Preseli Pembrokeshire

Hermon (Welsh pronunciation) is a small rural village in the parish of Llanfyrnach and the community of Crymych, Pembrokeshire, Wales, about 1 mile (1.6 km) southeast of Crymych.

== History ==
A pre-1850 parish map shows an inn in the village, The Lamb Inn which, according to CAMRA, is now (2018) closed.

== Chapel ==
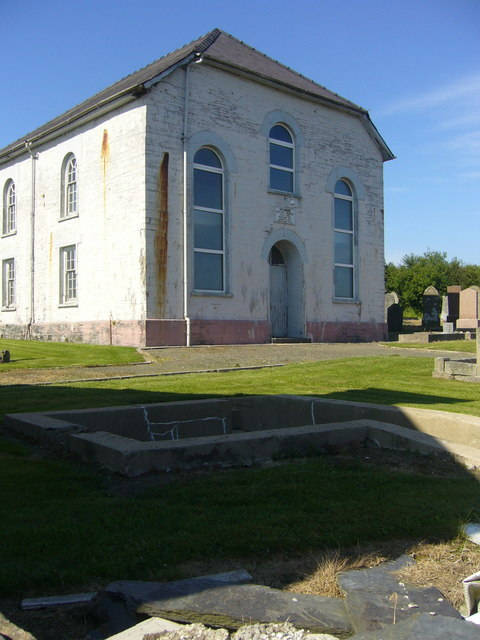
Hermon Baptist Chapel

There are two chapels in the village. Hermon Baptist Chapel was built in 1808 and subsequently rebuilt the same century. Brynmyrnach Welsh Independent Chapel was built in 1888.

== Community Centre ==
When Hermon School closed in 2006, it was bought by the community, extended and converted into a Community Resource Centre (Canolfan Hermon), which was completed in 2013. The 53 pupils of the school transferred to Ysgol-y-Frenni Community Primary School in Crymych.
