= Llanfyrnach =

Village and parish in Pembrokeshire, Wales

Coordinates: 51.95°N 4.59°W

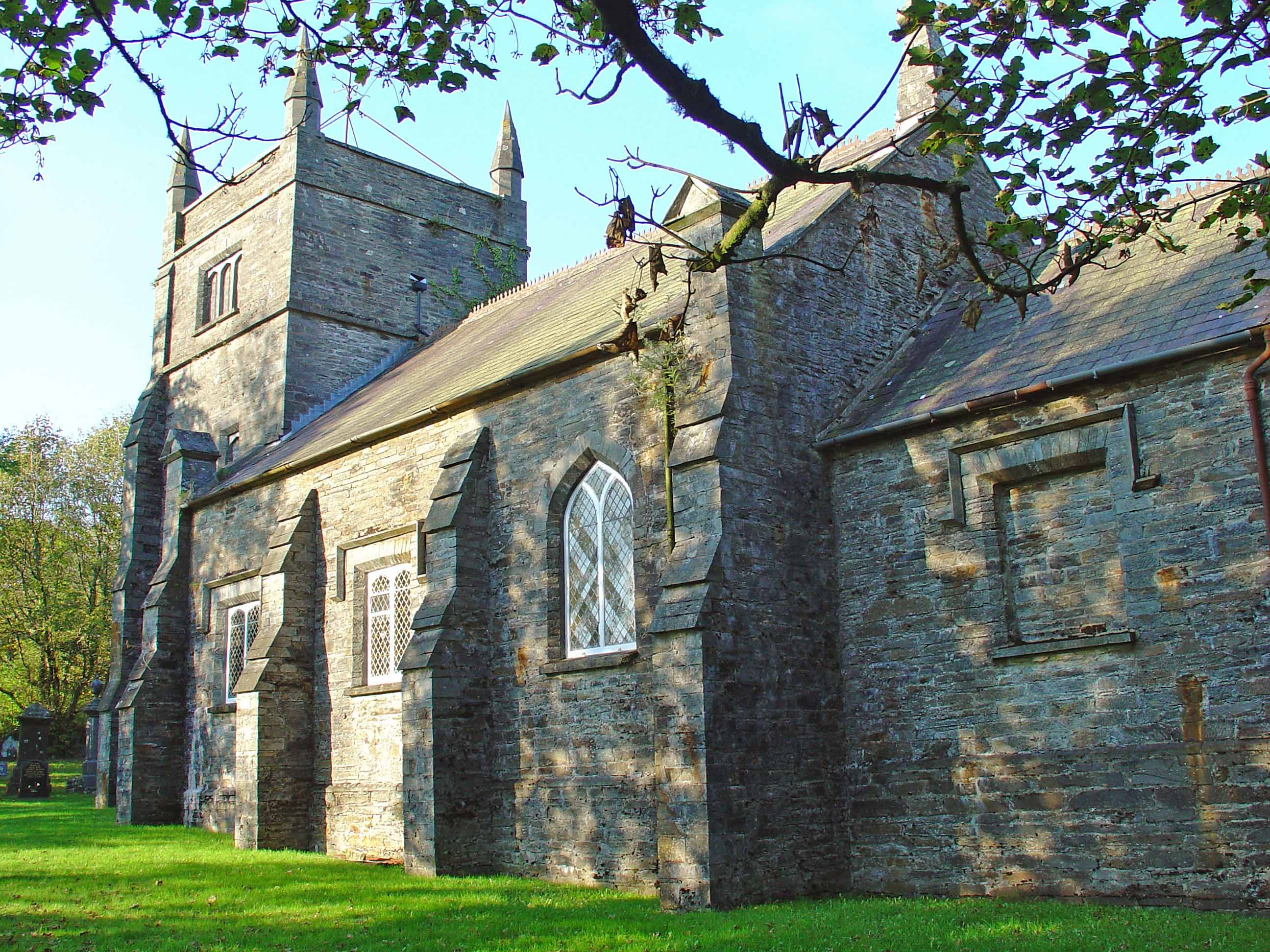
- Parish church of St Brynach, Llanfyrnach

- Location within Pembrokeshire
- OS grid reference: SN2195331195
- Community: Crymych
- Principal area: Pembrokeshire
- Preserved county: Dyfed
- Country: Wales
- Sovereign state: United Kingdom
- Post town: Llanfyrnach
- Postcode district: SA35
- Dialling code: 01239
- Police: Dyfed-Powys
- Fire: Mid and West Wales
- Ambulance: Welsh
- UK Parliament: Ceredigion Preseli
- Senedd Cymru – Welsh Parliament: Preseli Pembrokeshire

Llanfyrnach (Welsh pronunciation) is a village and parish in Pembrokeshire, Wales. The village is in the electoral ward and community of Crymych. The village of Crymych and the hamlets of Hermon, Glandwr and the eastern part of Pentre Galar are in Llanfyrnach parish. Llanfyrnach means the church of St Brynach.

Llanfyrnach village is in a remote upland area on the headwaters of the River Tâf, about 11 miles (18 km) from Cardigan.

== History ==
The parish of Llanfyrnach was in the ancient Cantref of Cemais. There is a small Norman motte close to the church. Llanfyrnach (as Llanvurnach) appears on a 1578 parish map of Pembrokeshire. Much of the parish was unenclosed moorland until the start of the 19th century. Population doubled as numerous small farms were established following enclosure from the 16th century onwards.

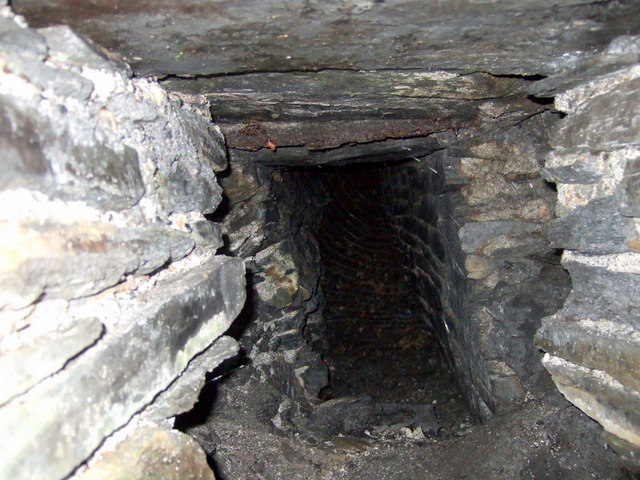
Llanfyrnach mine adit

There was an important lead mine on the north side of the village until the end of the 19th century. Mining occurred on a small scale for the sake of the low but significant concentration of silver in the ores, perhaps from as early as the 16th century. As a result of high demand for lead in the Victorian era, the mine was greatly extended in the 1840s, and had reached 520 m below the surface by the time of its closure in 1890.

The Whitland & Taf Vale Railway reached the village in 1873, and the village became a transport depot for the surrounding hill country; lead and agricultural produce were shipped out, and heavy supplies, notably lime, were brought in. Although the railway closed in 1963, the village is still a transport hub with Mansel Davies, the road haulage company, based in the village since 1900; the firm was the subject of an S4C documentary in 2017.

The Celtic Blue Rock festival was held at Trefawr Farm in the village, but lost its licence in 2010.

== St Brynach's Church ==
The present church is mid-Victorian, but there has been a Christian community in the village since at least the 6th century when Saint Brynach is believed to have come to the area. The parish includes a number of other settlements, particularly the village of Crymych and the hamlets of Glandwr and Pentre Galar. In 1872 the parish covered 6,328 acres (2,561 ha).

== Demographics ==
The village remains small, with much of the workforce employed in transportation. The population of the parish was 542 (1801), 933 (1851), 954 (1901), 844 (1951) and 837 (1981). The area remains largely Welsh-speaking; the proportion of Welsh speakers was 100% in 1891, 97% in 1931 and 82% in 1971.

== Notable people ==
The Welsh language poet T. E. Nicholas (1879–1971), bardic name Niclas y Glais, was born in Llanfyrnach

== See also ==
- Llanfyrnach Rural District, historic local government area abolished in 1934

Preceding station	Historical railways	Following station
Rhydowen	Great Western Railway; Whitland & Cardigan Railway	Glogue
