= Glandwr, Pembrokeshire =

Village in Pembrokeshire, Wales

Coordinates: 51.925°N 4.635°W

Glandwr
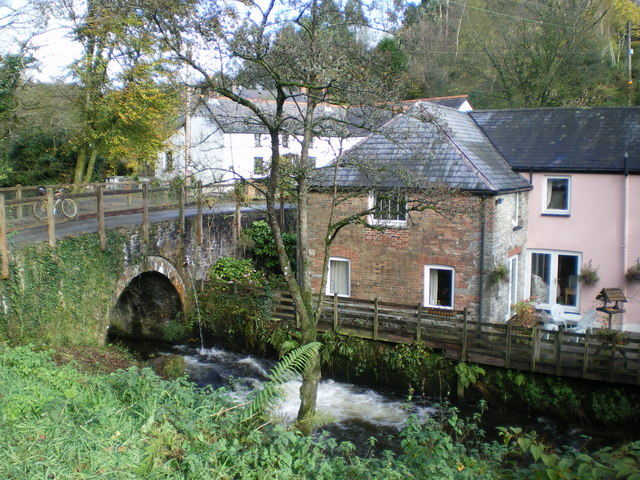
- Glandwr Mill and bridge over the River Gafel

- Location within Pembrokeshire
- OS grid reference: SN1928
- Community: Crymych
- Principal area: Pembrokeshire
- Preserved county: Dyfed
- Country: Wales
- Sovereign state: United Kingdom
- Post town: Whitland
- Postcode district: SA34
- Dialling code: 01239
- Police: Dyfed-Powys
- Fire: Mid and West Wales
- Ambulance: Welsh
- UK Parliament: Preseli Pembrokeshire
- Senedd Cymru – Welsh Parliament: Preseli Pembrokeshire

Glandwr is a small rural village in the parish of Llanfyrnach and the community of Crymych, Pembrokeshire, Wales. The village appears on a pre-1850 parish map as Glan-dwr. It is linked by unclassified roads to adjacent settlements and to the A478 road.

Glandwr sits on the River Gafel, which joins the River Taf to the southeast, and is the location of Lammas Ecovillage.

== Chapel ==
Glandwr has had an independent chapel (Capel Glandwr) since 1712, rebuilt or restored several times since. The current chapel is a Grade II listed building. The National Library of Wales holds historical information relating to the chapel.

== Mill ==
The village had a woollen mill at least as early as 1650.
