= Cardigan railway station =

Disused railway station in Wales

Cardigan
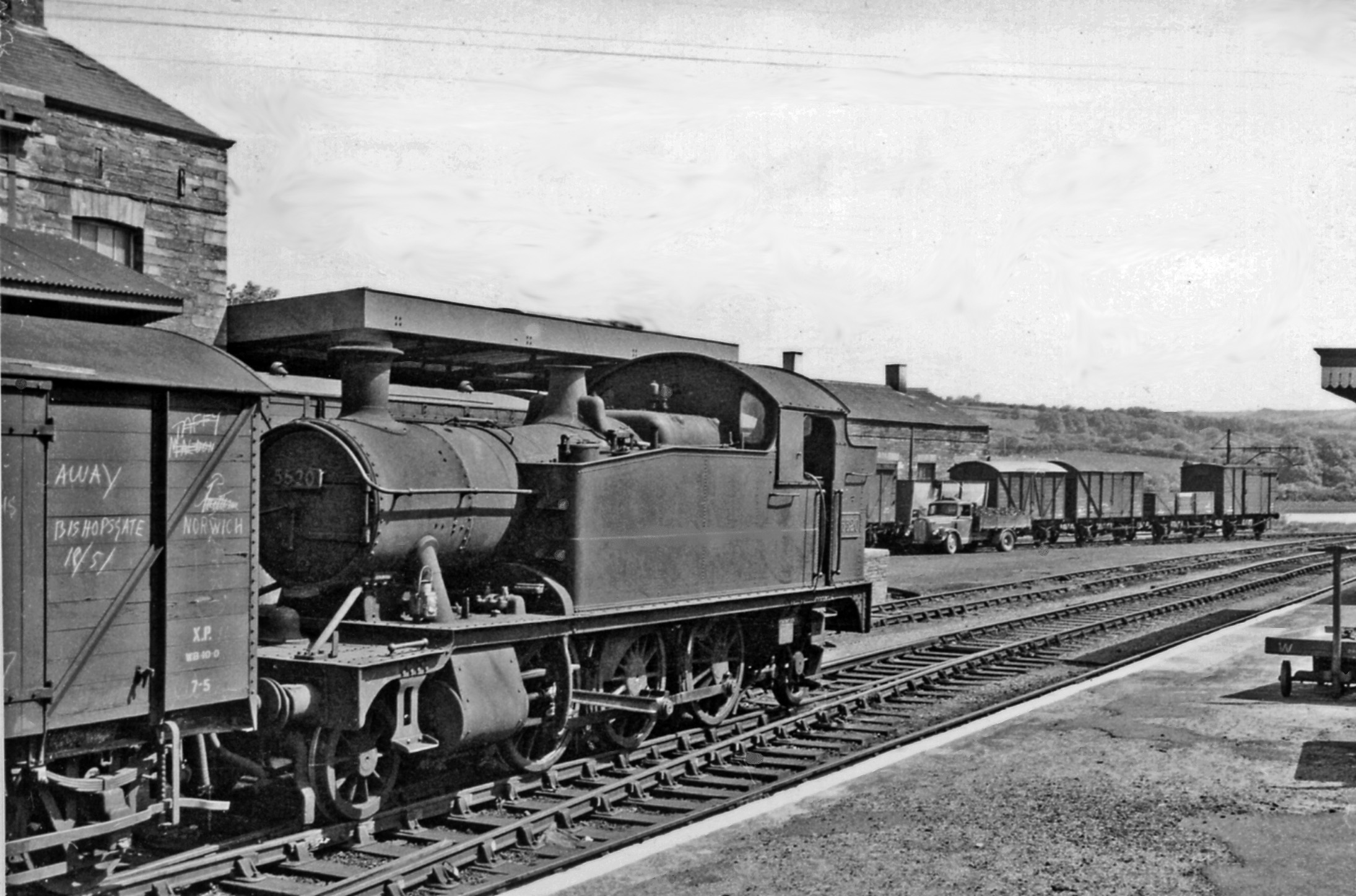
- Goods train at Cardigan railway station in 1962

General information
- Location: Cardigan, Ceredigion; Wales
- Coordinates: 52.0808°N 4.6567°W
- Grid reference: SN180458
- Platforms: 1

Other information
- Status: Disused

History
- Original company: Whitland and Cardigan Railway
- Pre-grouping: Whitland and Cardigan Railway
- Post-grouping: Great Western Railway

Key dates
- 31 August 1886: Station opens
- 10 September 1962: Station closes to passengers
- 27 May 1963: Line closes to goods
Location

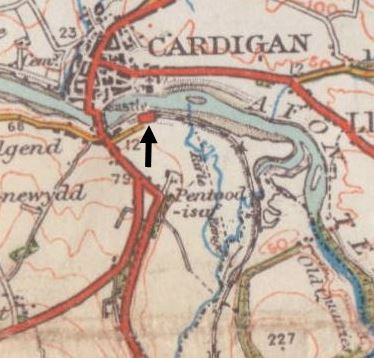
Cardigan railway station (arrowed), located south of the River Teifi, with the line curving in from the south, as shown on a 1930s map.

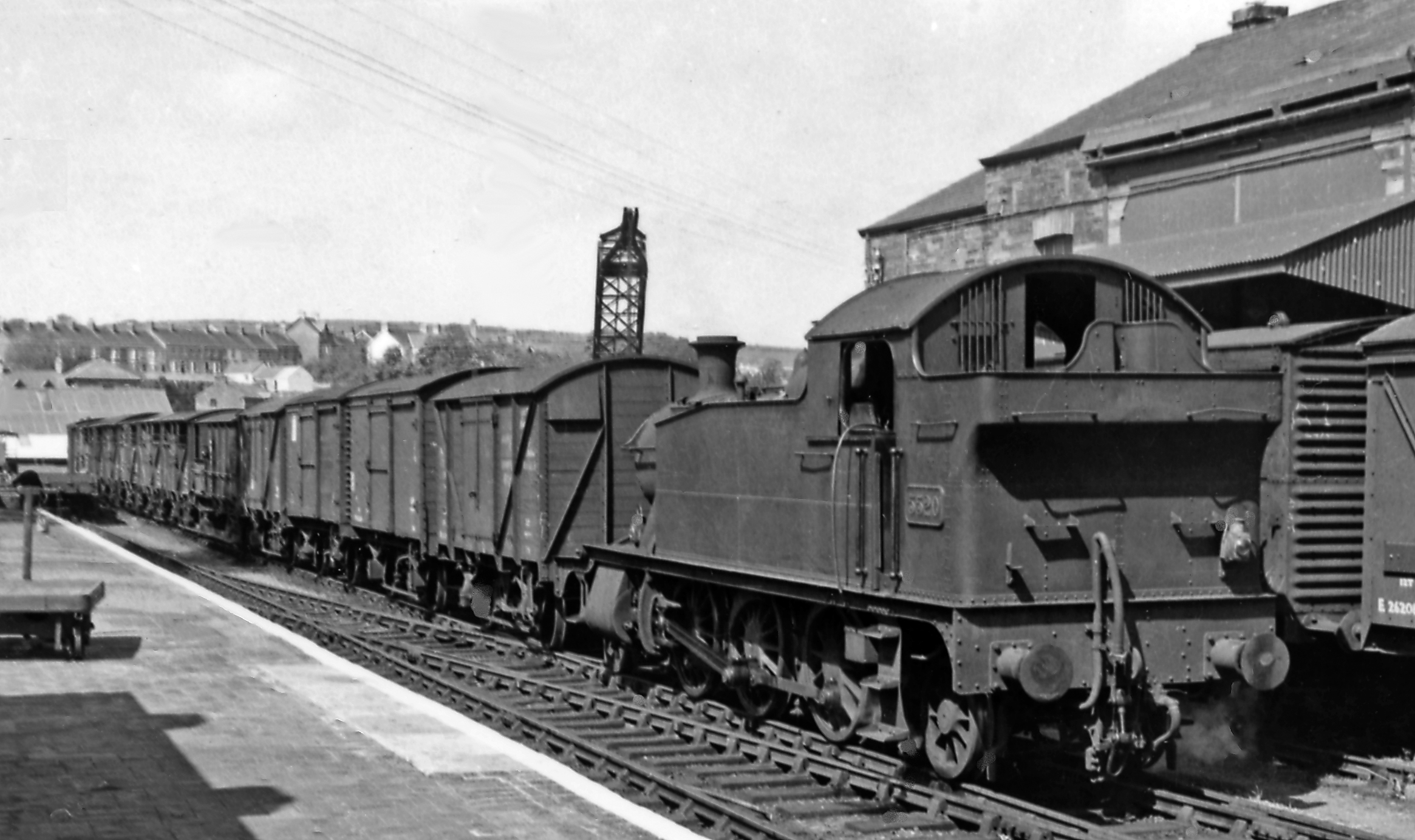
View looking west in 1962

Cardigan railway station in the county town of Cardigan, Ceredigion was the terminus of the Whitland and Cardigan Railway, opened on 31 August 1886. The line, previously known as the Whitland and Taf Vale Railway, and later familiarly as the 'Cardi Bach', was built between 1869 and 1873. With the extension to Cardigan opening in 1886, operations were taken over by the Great Western Railway.

Situated on the south side of the River Teifi, the arrival of the railway to Cardigan saw a gradual decline of trade from the port, with goods thereafter travelling on the railway.

The railway station closed to passengers on 10 September 1962 (prior to the Beeching Axe) but remained open to goods traffic until 27 May 1963. After that date the station remained open as a coal depot until April 1965, staffed by British Railways staff until November 1964. Final closure came on 6 September 1965. The old goods shed marks the site of the former station.

The section of old trackbed between Cardigan and Cilgerran is now a footway and cycle path through Teifi Marshes and Wildlife Park.

== On to Cardigan ==
On 2 August 1877 the company obtained authorisation to extend the line to Cardigan, by the Whitland and Taf Vale (Cardigan Extension) Railway Act 1877 (40 & 41 Vict. c. clxxxv); the company name was changed to the Whitland and Cardigan Railway. Completion to Cardigan was not speedy; securing subscriptions was a slow business, and land acquisition too was difficult, despite earlier positive indications by landowners. The opening was finally achieved on 31 August 1886; and on the following day the Great Western Railway took over the working of the line.

In 1879 the road coach connection between Crymmych Arms and Cardigan was discontinued by its operator. This was a significant issue for the company because of the contribution of through passengers to W&CR income. The Company exerted itself to find someone to take over, and a Captain Davies of Newport did so on the basis of a collaboration with the company.

On 10 August 1885 a special passenger excursion from Cardigan to Tenby via Whitland was run. The passenger stations were not ready and no Board of Trade authorisation of passenger operation had been obtained. It is likely that the line was far from completely finished, but that as a special arrangement the train was passed through the line where work was still in progress.

Work on the Cardigan extension continued, and Colonel Rich of the Board of Trade was able to visit to make the statutory inspection on 29 and 30 June 1886; however the line was not ready at this time and postponement of passenger opening was ordered. The necessary improvements were made and the line opened on 31 August 1886, and was handed over to the GWR for full operation the following day. (Note: From Price, pages 42 and 43, extracted from the Company's minute books. The passage is ambiguous as to whether the "opening" did in fact involve running trains, or was merely symbolic. Price says: "Accordingly arrangements were made to open the Cardigan Extension Railway for traffic on Tuesday 31 August 1886, and to hand it over to the GWR on the evening of the same day to enable them to begin working the next morning... These arrangements evidently went ahead as planned but it is not known what sort of service was operated on 31 August 1886. Suffice to say that it was the second and last time that the W&CR operated public passenger trains over the Cardigan extension... When the G.W.'s first train arrived in Cardigan it was greeted by the Mayor and a brass band and a large crowd..." Morris seems to agree: "For some reason that remains obscure, the directors wanted to run the first train to Cardigan themselves, and only hand the line over to the GWR to operate the day after.") The Whitland and Cardigan had never paid a dividend on ordinary shares since the change of title in 1877.

The GWR passenger service settled down to four trains each way each weekday, with an additional return trip on Saturdays and on the day of a monthly agricultural fair at Crymmych. The GWR was simply working the line, which was still owned by the shareholders, and when receipts declined they felt themselves powerless to change matters. It was only a matter of time before full absorption by the Great Western Railway was the obvious next step, and this was authorised by a section of the Great Western Railway Act 1890 (53 & 54 Vict. c. clix), dated 4 August, and taking retrospective effect from 1 July 1890. The line was now simply the Cardigan branch of the GWR.

== Decline and closure ==
The rural nature of the landscape, and particularly the very low population density made it difficult for the railway to earn income; the quarrying business too declined. Proposals for closure were prepared, and the line was closed to passenger traffic on 10 September 1962; the last passenger train was the 5.45pm Cardigan Mail on 8 September. Goods traffic continued, but closure of that also followed on 27 May 1963.

== Present ==
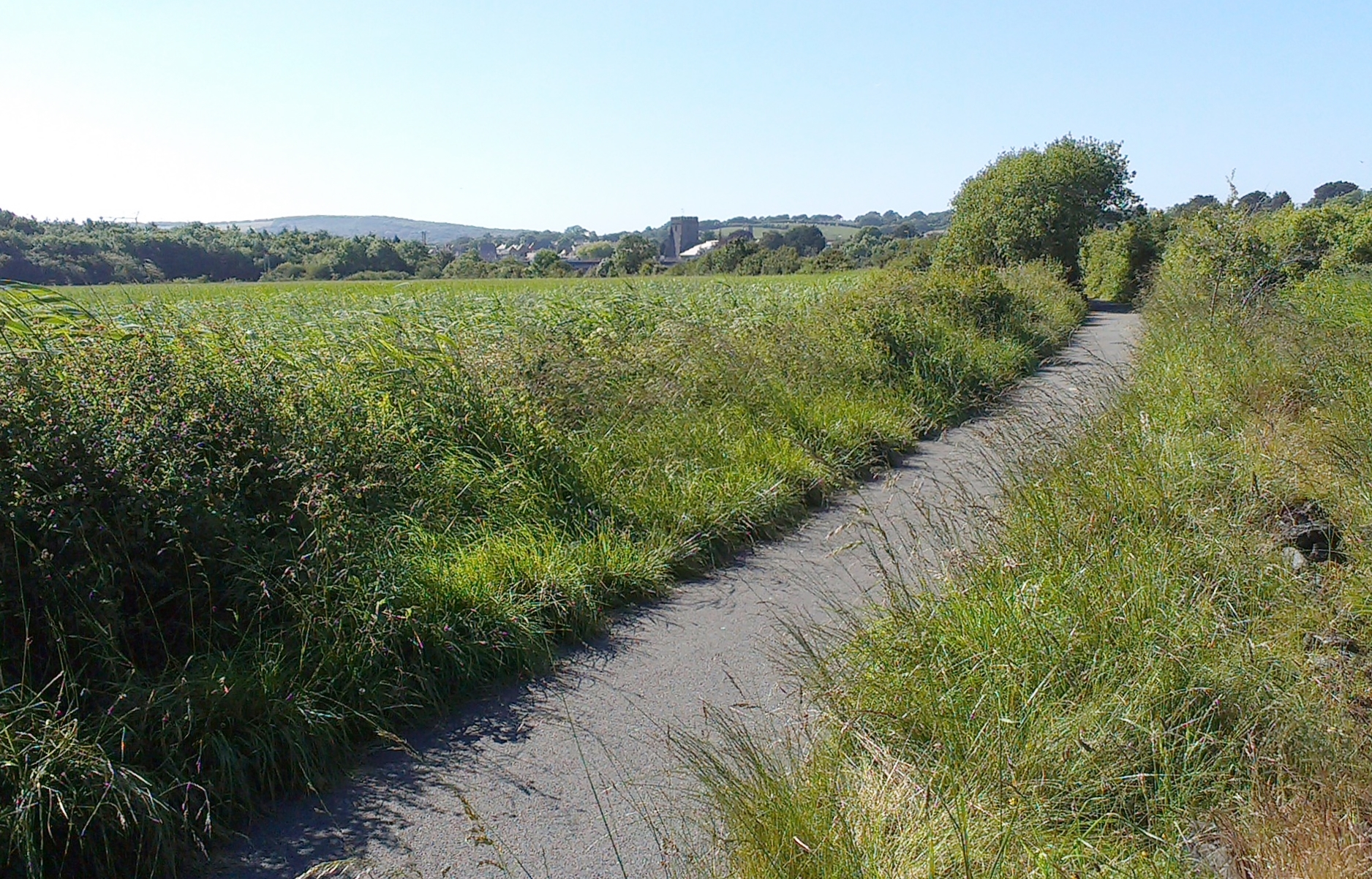
Part of the trackbed of the former Whitland & Cardigan railway near Cardigan (the church can be seen in the distance). It is now an all-ability path.

The trackbed is mainly intact, most having been sold off. Small scale development has taken place at some locations, including at the Cardigan station site. The trackbed between Cilgerran and Cardigan is a footway and cycle path through Teifi Marshes and Wildlife Park, a Site of Special Scientific Interest.

== Notes ==
Preceding station	Historical railways	Following station
Kilgerran Halt	Great Western Railway; Whitland & Cardigan Railway	Terminus
