= Whitland and Cardigan Railway =

Railway line in the UK

The Whitland and Cardigan Railway was a 27.5-mile (44.3 km) long branch line in West Wales. It was built in two stages, at first as the Whitland and Taf Vale Railway from the South Wales Main Line at Whitland to the quarries at Glogue. It opened in 1873, at first only for goods and minerals and later for passengers. The line to Cardigan opened in 1886; this was reflected in the company name change.

Although a dividend was paid, the company was always short of cash. Huge borrowings made it unable to pay its way; it was taken over by the Great Western Railway in 1886. Still considerably loss-making, it closed to passengers in 1962 and completely in 1963.

== Carmarthen and Cardigan Railway ==
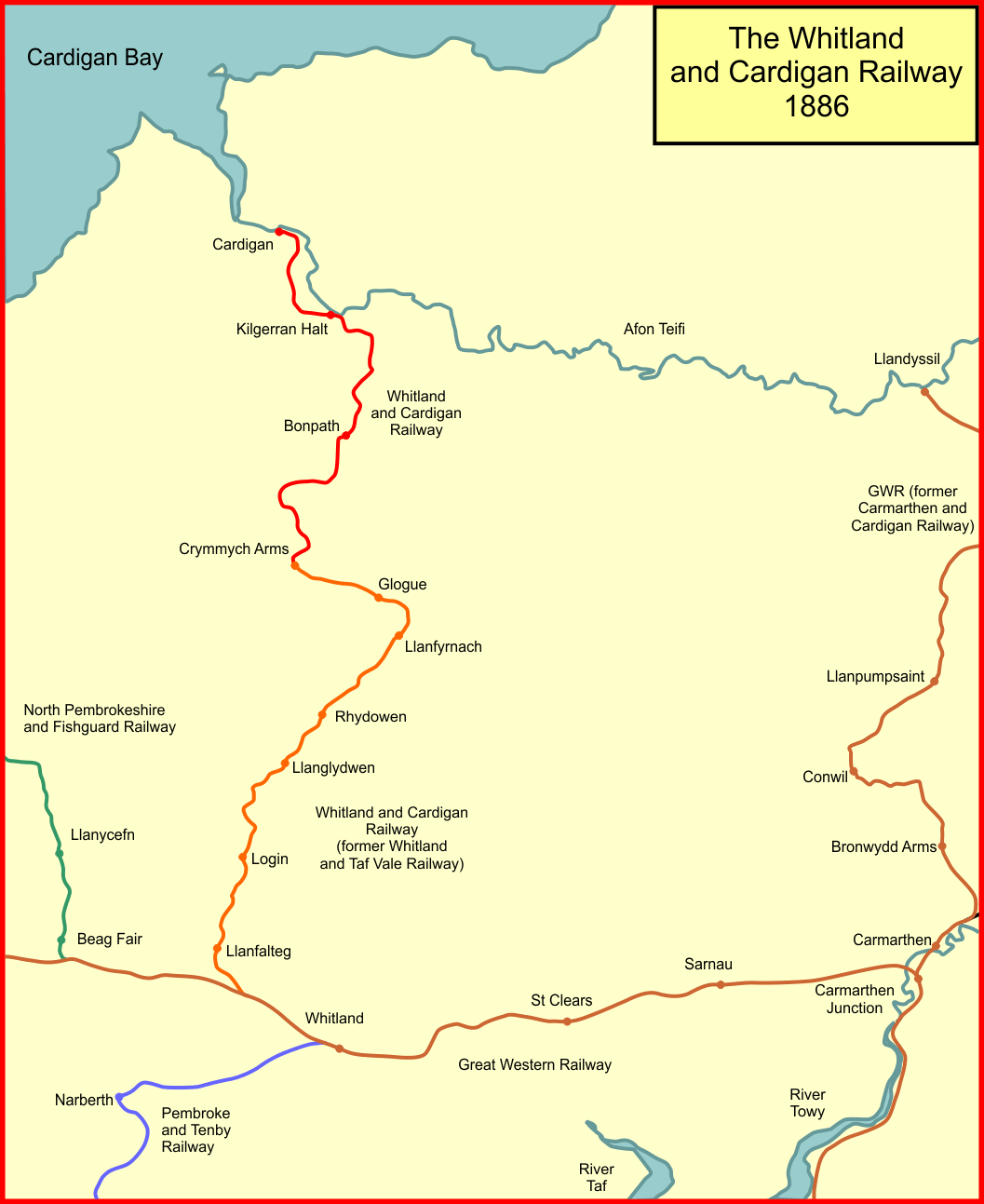
The Whitland and Cardigan Railway

Although coastal shipping was possible, the road system serving Cardigan at the beginning of the nineteenth century was primitive and unsatisfactory. The South Wales Railway opened its broad gauge main line to Carmarthen in 1852, with the expressed intention of continuing to Fishguard; this was intended to connect to railways in the south of Ireland, but economic events resulted in a change of western terminal to Neyland, on Milford Haven. Neyland was then known as New Milford. The Carmarthen and Cardigan Railway was formed to build a broad gauge branch line from Carmarthen to Cardigan, and it was authorised by act of Parliament, the Carmarthen and Cardigan Railway Act 1854 (17 & 18 Vict. c. ccxviii), of 1 July 1854, with share capital of £300,000. At first this was to build as far as Newcastle Emlyn only; the intention was to obtain further authorisation and investment later to complete the line to Cardigan. Although the act of Parliament authorised the share capital, actually persuading investors to commit the money proved extremely difficult, and the company was unable to proceed with the construction as far or as fast as it intended. In fact the line opened as far as Conwil on 3 September 1860 and to Llandyssil on 3 June 1864. The company never managed to build further than that point, although it was later taken over by the Great Western Railway, which extended the line to Newcastle Emlyn on 1 July 1895. The idea of completing beyond that point to Cardigan had long since been abandoned.

== Industry in the Taf Valley ==
Although the area of west Wales near Cardigan was predominantly agricultural, there was already some mineral extraction in the eighteenth century. Lead and silver mines had long existed near Llanfyrnach, and by the nineteenth century the workings had become extensive. At Glogue there were slate quarries. Both of these locations were in the Taf Valley which provided a natural line of transportation to coastal shipping at Carmarthen Bay or at Cardigan or Newport. After the opening of the South Wales Railway in 1854 from Carmarthen to Haverfordwest the slate was also transported away by rail from Narberth Road.

== A railway planned ==
Animal transport down the valley was nonetheless an expensive and slow business. By 1868 John Owen (1818–1886) was the operator of the quarry at Glogue, and he formed an alliance with the engineer James W Szlumper in the cause of establishing a railway connection from Glogue down to the main line at Whitland, where there was to be a small terminal to the north of the Great Western Railway station. A standard gauge line was contemplated, although the former South Wales Railway main line (by this time part of the Great Western Railway) was broad gauge. The northern terminal was to be Crymmych, a short distance north of Glogue, and a hub for the local road network.

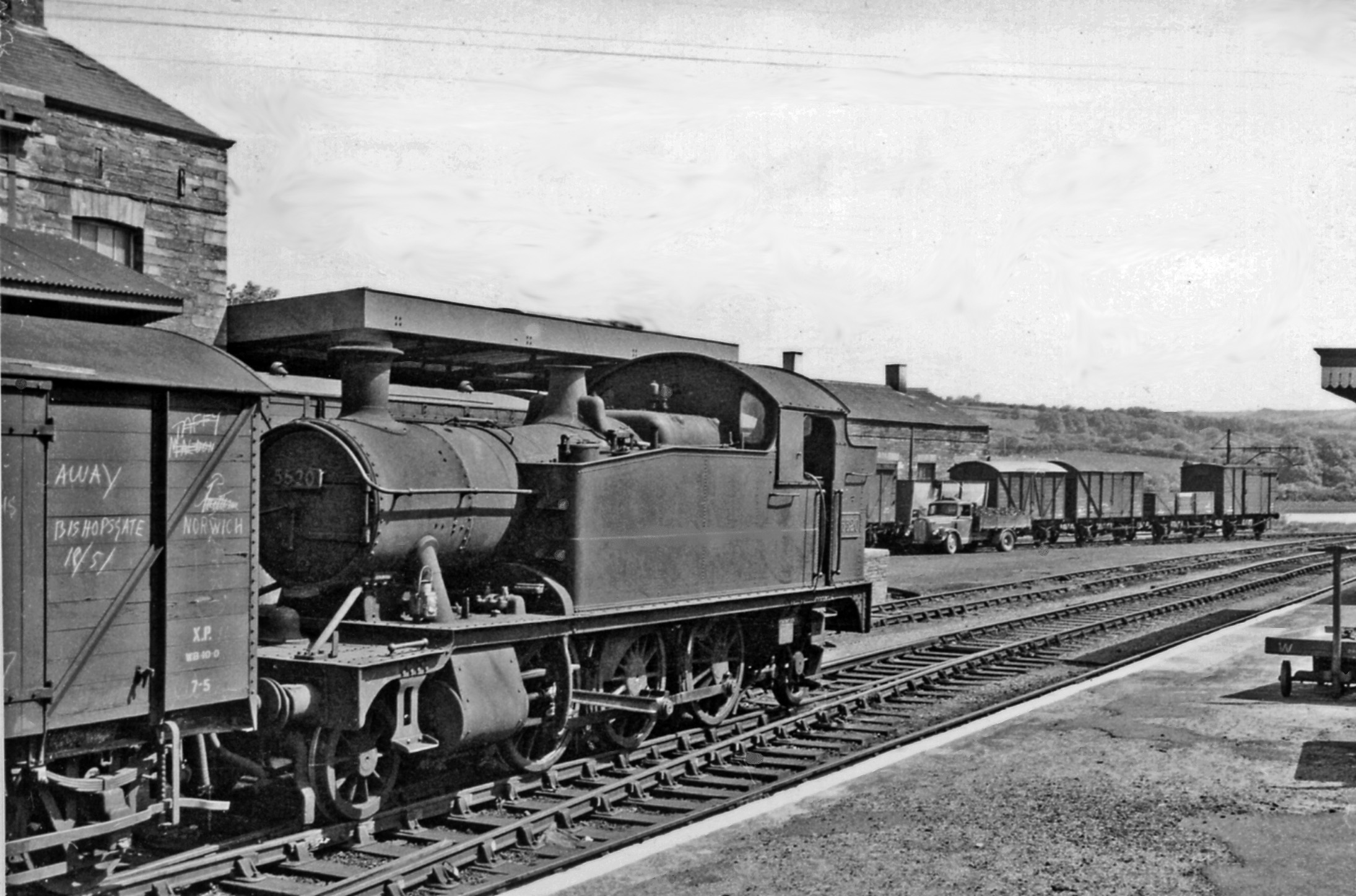
A goods train at Cardigan in 1962, shunted by GWR 4575 Class No. 5520

Szlumper was the manager of the Pembroke and Tenby Railway (P&TR) as well: the friendly relations with that line were important to the Taf Vale concern because the P&TR was a standard gauge railway too, and it had an act of Parliament giving approval to build from Whitland to Carmarthen. At Carmarthen there were other standard gauge lines giving access to the rest of the railway network independently of the Great Western Railway and without the necessity of using the broad gauge. This apparent alliance immediately made the GWR hostile, as a network of standard gauge lines by-passing its own main line was obviously unwelcome.

In the event, the P&TR did not build an independent line from Whitland to Carmarthen: the Great Western Railway (GWR) was persuaded to lay a single standard gauge line on its own formation connecting Whitland and Carmarthen. Moreover, the W&TVR directors managed to negotiate an agreement with the GWR to use the GWR accommodation at Whitland, and the GWR agreed to withdraw opposition to the W&TVR parliamentary bill.

== Parliamentary authorisation ==
On 12 July 1869 the Whitland and Taf Vale Railway obtained its authorising act of Parliament, the Whitland and Taf Vale Railway Act 1869 (32 & 33 Vict. c. xci) with capital of £37,000.

The junction of the Taf Vale line with the Great Western Railway main line (referred to as Taf Vale Junction until the later extension to Cardigan) was to be a little over two miles west of Whitland, and the W&TVR needed the Great Western to agree to lay in mixed gauge track on its line to enable W&TVR trains to reach Whitland. The negotiation proved to be difficult—in fact after a frustrating meeting in April 1869 the position was recorded in W&TVR minutes as being "hopeless". The delay made construction difficult, as rail access to the line under construction was not possible for the contractor.

Land acquisition proved more expensive than the directors had anticipated, but it was possible to let a contract for the construction of the line in the amount of £8,700 to Edward Lewis of Glandovey on 13 October 1870. A major problem was that subscriptions for shares were considerably short of expectations: of the authorised £37,000 only £19,300 had been taken up by April 1872, limiting the directors' freedom to enter into agreements. However the junction with the GWR had been satisfactorily installed at last.

Towards the end of the construction a dispute regarding payments due arose with the contractor, Lewis. The company intended to open the line on 14 January 1873, but Lewis indicated that he was not prepared to hand over the line unless he was paid his outstanding claims. The company found it difficult to come to agreement with Lewis, but Lieutenant Colonel Hutchinson of the Board of Trade inspected the junction arrangements with the GWR at Taf Vale Junction on 17 March 1873, and subject to some improvements at the junction, approved opening. (As the Taf Vale line was not to be opened to passengers at this stage, approval of the Taf Vale line was not required.)

== First opening ==
The line was opened as far as Glogue to goods and minerals trains on 24 March 1873; Lewis's claim went to litigation, and he received a partial award of his claimed payment. By this time the former South Wales Railway main line had been converted to standard gauge, so the issue of mixed gauge track to Whitland station no longer applied.

The initial freight train service was two trains daily. On 15 March 1873, before the line was opened, the only brake van was derailed; as a suspension fault was to blame it was returned to the makers, and for some time the trains operated without a brake van, the guard riding in open wagons.

On 29 April 1873 the board decided to proceed with construction to Crymmych by directly employed labour. This took some time even though the extension was short; it probably opened early in July 1874. (Note: Barrie says "by August 1874" for goods. MacDermot says "by October 1874", as does Burrell.) Arrangements were made with a carrier to provide a road connection for goods to and from Cardigan.

The business on the line increased very well and in fact a second engine had to be procured to handle the traffic. The directors wanted to start passenger operation too, and the necessary signalling (by McKenzie and Holland) and station accommodation were being provided. Now an inspection of the line by the Board of Trade inspector was required, and the notice was given to the Board of Trade on 29 June 1875. In fact the inspecting officer failed to visit within the ten day timescale allowed and the directors opened the line to passengers on 12 July 1875. (Note: Barrie says 12 January 1875, but this must be a mistake.)

At the AGM it was stated:

On the 12th of July the line was opened for passenger traffic, and on the 15th it was inspected by Col. Rich. In his report he said the railway appeared to be substantially constructed... Since the opening, the receipts shod an increase of £213, as compared with the 5 weeks last year... The engineer's report was... that Colonel Rich, R.E., inspected the [line] on the 15th ultimo, and minutely examined the details of the entire works, expressing much satisfaction therewith.

Colonel Rich of the Board of Trade had written proposing an inspection on 15 July, and on 17 July, having been informed of the unauthorised opening, the BoT wrote demanding that the company suspend passenger operation for a month.

Szlumper now pointed out that the line had been properly opened because of the failure of the inspecting officer to visit during the allowed ten days, and that the Board of Trade had no power to order the suspension of traffic on what was now an open railway, as opposed to the opening of a new railway.

Colonel Rich made a visit and made recommendations; he reported that the track was Vignoles (flat-bottom) rail spiked to transverse sleepers; the steepest gradient (he said) was 1 in 40 and the sharpest curve was of 12 chains radius, although a later GWR assessment of the line showed steeper gradients and sharper curves than this. (Note: No doubt Rich relied on information supplied by the company on these statistical matters.) The passenger service consisted of four trains each way every weekday; there was a connecting road service to Cardigan and to Newport. The rails were rather light, at 50 lbs/yard. (Note: Morris says that the gradients were "not severe", and that the passenger platforms on the Glogue section were provided from the outset, before passenger operation.)

Profitability improved and in the second half of 1875 it proved possible to pay a dividend of 3% on ordinary shares.

A third locomotive was obtained in April 1877, but the company did not have the cash in the capital account, and the engine was mortgaged to three named directors for the time being. The engine was heavier than its predecessors and it was found to damage the light track structure in use.

== Cardigan extension ==
On 2 August 1877, the company obtained authorisation to extend the line to Cardigan, by the Whitland and Taf Vale (Cardigan Extension) Railway Act 1877 (40 & 41 Vict. c. clxxxv); the company name was changed to the Whitland and Cardigan Railway. Completion to Cardigan was not speedy; securing subscriptions was a slow business, and land acquisition too was difficult, despite earlier positive indications by landowners. The opening was finally achieved on 1 September 1886; and on the same day the Great Western Railway took over the working of the line.

In 1879 the road coach connection between Crymmych Arms and Cardigan was discontinued by its operator. This was a significant issue for the company because of the contribution of through passengers to W&CR income. The company exerted itself to find someone to take over, and a Captain Davies of Newport did so on the basis of a collaboration with the company.

Relations with the company engineer Szlumper deteriorated sharply during the planning of the extension works, and in May 1879 he was discharged. This resulted in the planning work on the Cardigan extension being suspended. At this difficult time the GWR presented an account for £3,800 in connection with the traffic agreement; David Davies presented an account for £14,000 for repayment of debentures and Szlumper now submitted accounts for his former services for £2,700. With the Cardigan extension in suspense, it was impossible to raise further subscription money to pay these claims. Negotiations with the GWR with a view to the larger company taking over foundered when an inspection disclosed that the state of the line was that it was "in bad order".

At the end of 1879 new contractors, Appleby and Lawton, became involved as prospective builders of the extension, and J. B. Walton was appointed engineer for the works. A variation to the route was designed, saving considerable earthworks at the cost of steeper gradients, and Appleby and Lawton agreed to complete the line for £48,000. The company still did not have that kind of money available, and the only salvation for their finances, they believed, was the extra income that completion to Cardigan would bring in.

Having the line worked by the Great Western Railway seemed to be a solution, and lengthy negotiations towards that outcome proceeded. Eventually at a shareholders' meeting on 16 March 1883 the shareholders approved an agreement with the GWR, which also included a GWR contribution to the Cardigan extension, and enabled a contract with Appleby and Lawton in the sum of £48,270 to be concluded. The GWR was to take over the working fully on completion of the Cardigan extension, and meantime to work the line as agents, with a joint committee of GWR and W&CR directors controlling matters.

Still the works were hampered by land acquisition delays and by the lack of cash to pay the contractor sums that became due. Work on the Cardigan extension started on 1 May 1883; in addition, the original line to Crymmych had to be relaid (and bridges reconstructed) in more robust materials, and the estimate for that work was much higher than anticipated.

Nonetheless, work proceeded, and by late 1884 Boncath was reached, and Appleby and Lawton started carrying goods traffic to that point on behalf of the company. On 10 August 1885 a special passenger excursion from Cardigan to Tenby via Whitland was run. However, the passenger stations were not ready and no Board of Trade authorisation of passenger operation had been obtained. It is likely that the line was far from completely finished, but that as a special arrangement the train was passed through the line where work was still in progress.

== Cardigan branch ==
Work on the Cardigan extension continued. Colonel Rich of the Board of Trade visited to make the statutory inspection on 29 and 30 June 1886; the line was not ready and postponement of passenger opening was ordered. The necessary improvements were made and the line opened on 31 August 1886, and was handed over to the GWR for full operation the following day. (Note: From Price, pages 42 and 43, extracted from the company's minute books. The passage is ambiguous as to whether the "opening" did in fact involve running trains, or was merely symbolic. Price says: "Accordingly arrangements were made to open the Cardigan Extension Railway for traffic on Tuesday 31 August 1886, and to hand it over to the GWR on the evening of the same day to enable them to begin working the next morning... These arrangements evidently went ahead as planned but it is not known what sort of service was operated on 31 August 1886. Suffice to say that it was the second and last time that the W&CR operated public passenger trains over the Cardigan extension... When the G.W.'s first train arrived in Cardigan it was greeted by the Mayor and a brass band and a large crowd..." Morris seems to agree: "For some reason that remains obscure, the directors wanted to run the first train to Cardigan themselves, and only hand the line over to the GWR to operate the day after.") The Whitland and Cardigan had never paid a dividend on ordinary shares since the change of title in 1877.

The GWR passenger service settled down to four trains each way each weekday, with an additional return trip on Saturdays and on the day of the monthly agricultural fair at Crymmych. The GWR was simply working the line, which was still owned by the shareholders, and when receipts declined they felt themselves powerless to change matters. It was only a matter of time before full absorption by the Great Western Railway was the obvious next step, and this was authorised by a section of the Great Western Railway Act 1890 (53 & 54 Vict. c. clix), dated 4 August, and taking retrospective effect from 1 July 1890. The line was now simply the Cardigan branch of the GWR.

John Owen had worked the Glogue quarry in its early days. It was later sold, and continued in use until 1926.

The train service and the outward appearance of the line changed little over succeeding years. Nationalisation of the main line railways of Great Britain took place in 1948, and the area was under the control of British Railways, Western Region.

== Decline and closure ==
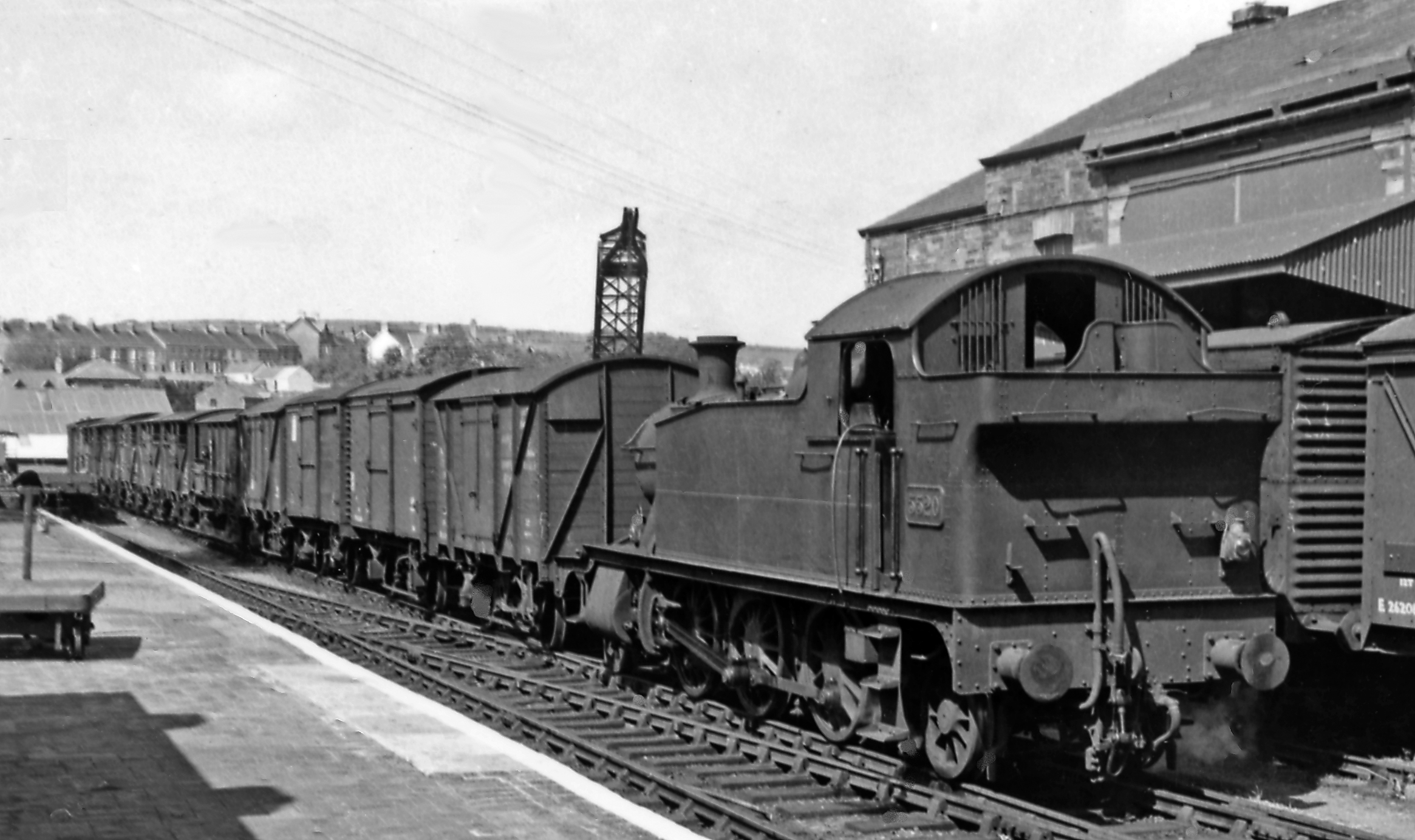
Cardigan station in 1962 looking west

The rural nature of the landscape, and particularly the very low population density, made it difficult for the railway to earn income; the quarrying business too declined. Proposals for closure were prepared, and the line was closed to passenger traffic on 10 September 1962; the last passenger train was the 5.45pm Cardigan Mail on 8 September. Goods traffic continued, but closure to that too followed on 27 May 1963.

== Topography ==
- Cardigan; opened 31 August 1886; closed 10 September 1962;
- Kilgerran Halt; opened 31 August 1886; closed 10 September 1962; the local settlement is named Cilgerran;
- Boncath; opened 31 August 1886; closed 10 September 1962;
- Crymmych Arms; opened 12 July 1875; closed 10 September 1962;
- Glogue; opened 12 July 1875; closed 10 September 1962;
- Llanfyrnach; opened 12 July 1875; closed 10 September 1962;
- Rhydowen; opened 12 July 1875; closed 10 September 1962;
- Llanglydwen; opened 12 July 1875; closed 10 September 1962;
- Login; opened 12 July 1875; closed 10 September 1962;
- Llanfalteg; opened 12 July 1875; closed 10 September 1962;
- Taf Vale Junction; from 1896 Cardigan Junction.

The line had steep gradients and sharp curves; as far as Glogue it climbed continuously at 1 in 40 to 1 in 50, with a final steep section at 1 in 35. After Glogue the line fell with a ruling gradient of 1 in 40.

The trackbed is mainly intact, most having been sold off. Small scale development has taken place at some locations, such as at Llanfallteg and Cardigan station sites. The trackbed between Cilgerran and Cardigan is a footway and cycle path through Teifi Marshes and Wildlife Park, a Site of Special Scientific Interest.

In September 2012 to mark the 50th anniversary of the line's closure, an exhibition was held by the local historical society at the site of the former Llanfallteg station, where a remembrance plaque, illustrated by local artist Peter Icke, was later placed by Llanfallteg History Society.

A local Welsh language newspaper uses the nickname of the line, Cardi bach, as does the shuttle bus service between Cardigan and New Quay.
