= Star, Pembrokeshire =

Village in Pembrokeshire, Wales

Coordinates: 51.9848°N 4.5553°W

Star
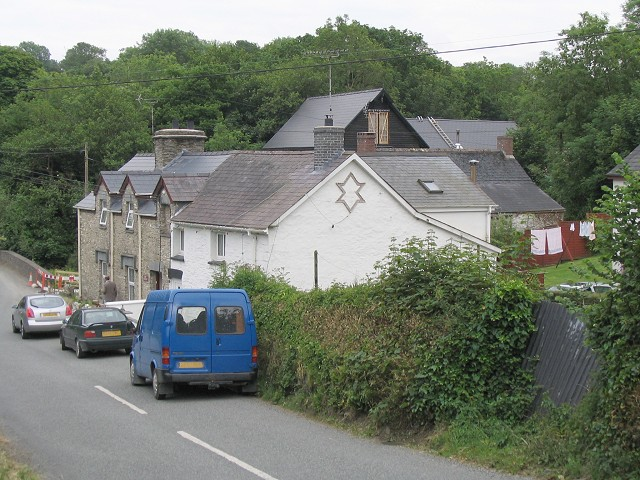

- Location within Pembrokeshire
- OS grid reference: SN245350
- Community: Clydau
- Principal area: Pembrokeshire
- Country: Wales
- Sovereign state: United Kingdom
- Post town: Llanfyrnach
- Postcode district: SA35
- Dialling code: 01239
- Police: Dyfed-Powys
- Fire: Mid and West Wales
- Ambulance: Welsh

Star is a small village in the parish and community of Clydau in Pembrokeshire, Wales.

It lies south of Bwlchygroes on a crossroads in the valley of the Afon Cneifa (a tributary of Afon Cych) where the river is bridged.

== History ==
In 1910 there was a mill processing wheat and corn in the village, and a public house, the Lancych Arms, taking its name from the small settlement of Lancych on Afon Cych to the north.

== Chapel ==
Star Baptist Chapel was opened in 1881. It has an external baptism tank. In 1892 the annual meeting of the Pembrokeshire Baptist Association was held in Star, with preaching to large numbers of people over two days.
