= Eluned Phillips =

Welsh poet (1914–2009)

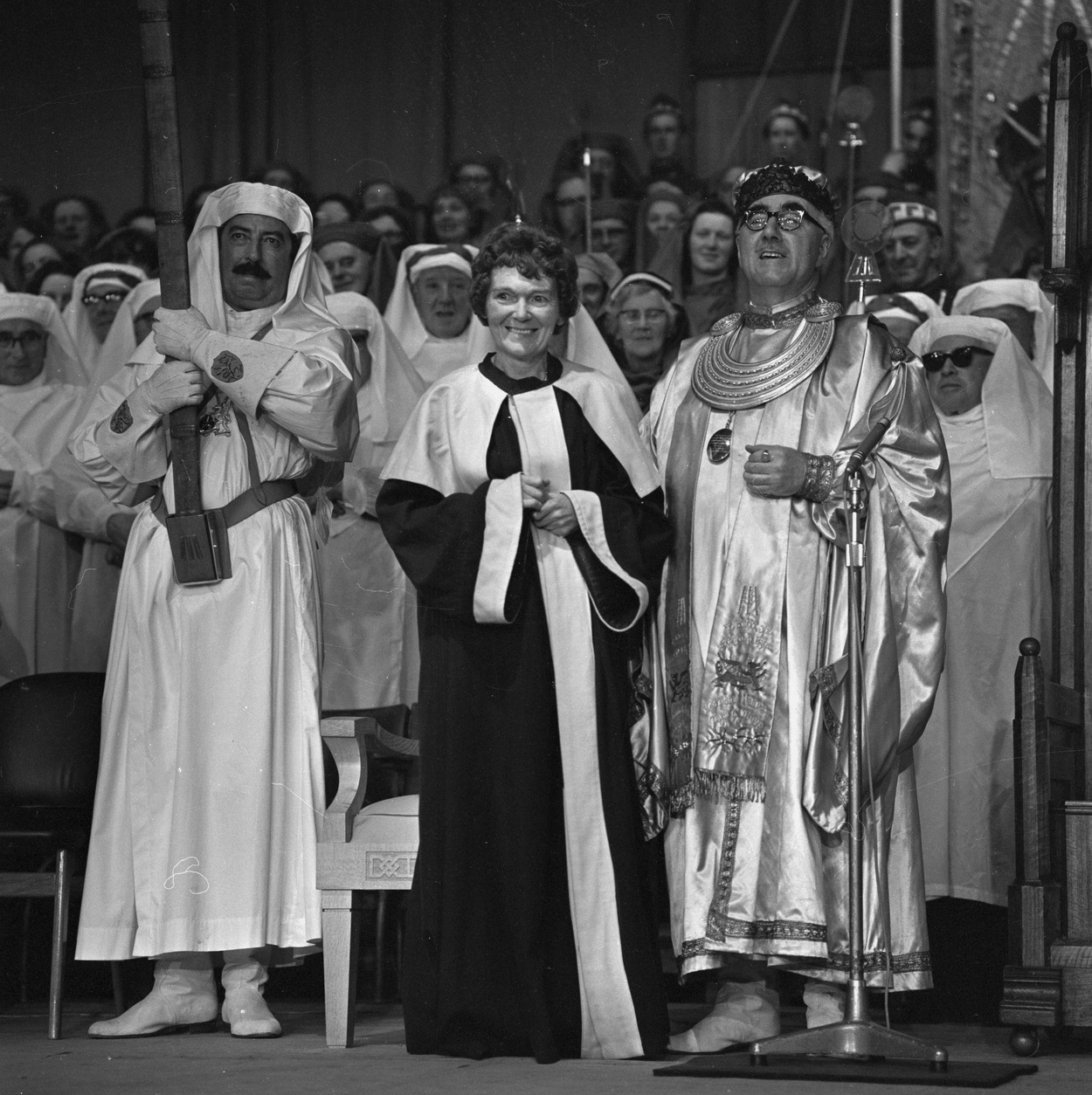
- Born: 27 October 1914; Cenarth
- Died: 10 January 2009 (aged 94); Glangwili General Hospital
- Occupation: Writer

Sara Adeline Eluned Phillips (27 October 1914 – 10 January 2009) was a poet and writer. She was the second woman to win the bardic crown at the National Eisteddfod of Wales and the only woman to win it twice.

== Early life ==
Phillips was born in Cenarth on 27 October 1914. Her father was killed in World War I.

She had red hair, which she didn't like, and, at age 4, she endangered her life trying to dye her hair black by dipping her head in tar.

At 7 years old, she was accused of plagiarism for a poem she submitted to the local paper, but proved her innocence by writing another poem in front of her accuser.

She attended the primary school in Abercych and went to the Congregationalist chapel in Cenarth, where she learnt to read Welsh and the rules of the cynghanedd. She received her schooling from Cardigan Grammar School and then a boarding school in London. While in London, she often visited Paris and met many contemporary writers and artists.

She studied journalism at the University of London in 1939, but her studies were interrupted by the start of World War II.

== Career ==
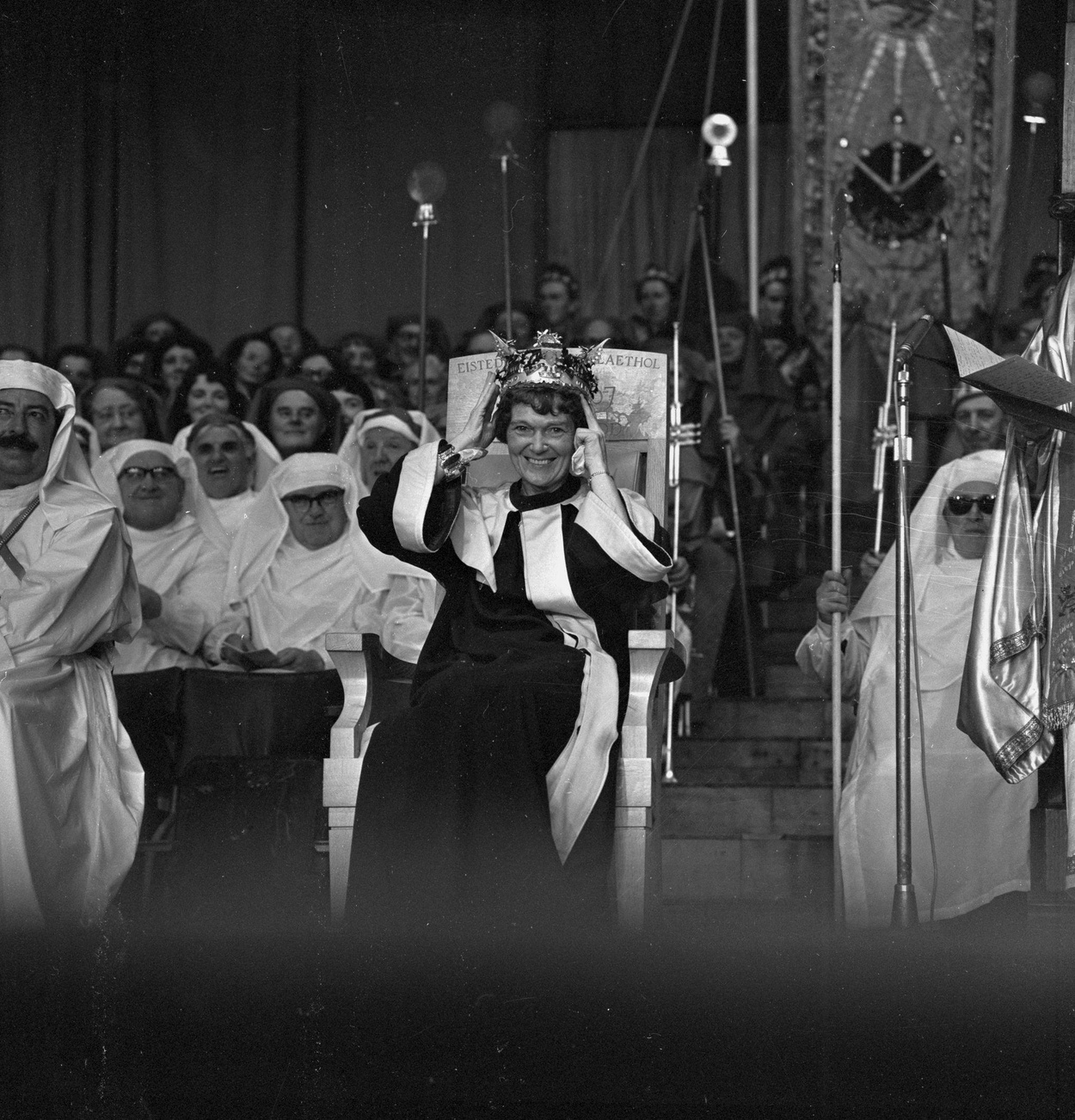
Phillips at the 1967 National Eisteddfod

She joined the Gorsedd of Bards aged 22; her bardic name was Luned Teifi.

While living in London, Phillips wrote poetry and for magazines, as well as several Mills & Boon novels. She moved to Newcastle Emlyn, working as a court translator, in a solicitor's office and as a scriptwriter for BBC Wales.

Phillips won the crown at the National Eisteddfod in 1967 at Bala. She described the experience of receiving the crown as "extreme ecstasy". Unfounded rumours fuelled by sexist prejudice spread that she was claiming credit for a poem that must have been written by a man.

She won the crown again in 1983 at Llangefni with a poem called Clymau (transl. Bonds) about a Welshman in the British Army and Patagonian-Welsh Argentinian.

In 1997, she bought her first computer to write her memoir.

== Personal life ==
Phillips was born on the same day that Dylan Thomas was born in Swansea. She knew Thomas well, but did not like him. Her bohemian lifestyle introduced her to many artists of the era, and she was friends with Augustus John, Edith Piaf and Maurice Chevalier. Pablo Picasso showed her the original of Guernica shortly after he completed it.

She never married, and lived with her aunt in a house called Glyn-y-Mêl in Cenarth, after which she named her book of poetry.

In 1997, she was in two serious car crashes in Los Angeles.

== Death ==
She died of pneumonia on 10 January 2009, aged 94, at Glangwili Hospital in Carmarthen. At the time of her death, she was the oldest member of the Gorsedd of Bards.

== Legacy ==
Cenarth Community Council opened a memorial garden to her on what would have been her 100th birthday. A bursary was also gifted in her name to a Welsh author to fund a novel-writing course.

== Works ==
- Dewi Emrys (1971) (biography)
- Cerddi Glyn-y-Mêl (transl. Glyn-y-Mêl Poems) (1985) (poetry)
- The Reluctant Redhead (2007) (memoir)
