= Cenarth Mill =

Listed former Welsh corn mill

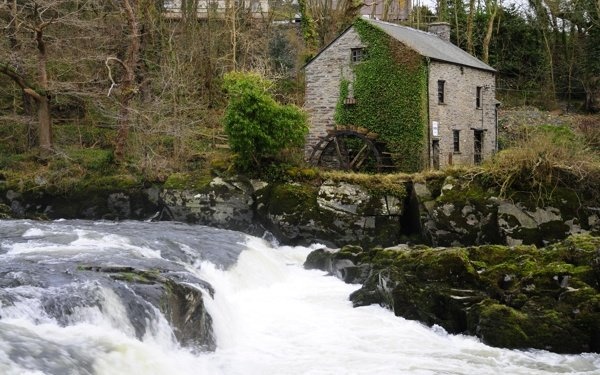
- Cenarth Mill in 2008
- Location: Cenarth, Carmarthenshire, Wales
- Coordinates: 52.045495°N 4.523977°W

Water Power
- Diameter / width of water wheel: 5 m (16 ft) /

Equipment
- Date: late 18th to early 19th century

Listed Building – Grade II*
- Official name: Cenarth Mill
- Designated: 8 January 1975
- Reference no.: 9723

Cenarth Mill (Welsh: Melin Cenarth) is 18th-century water-powered corn mill in Cenarth which now incorporates the National Coracle Centre. It is a grade II* listed building.

== Description ==
Cenarth Mill, also known as Melin Cenarth, is an eighteenth-century corn mill located in Cenarth on the riverside of the Teifi, taking advantage of Cenarth Falls. It is one of the best surviving mills in South West Wales and has gearing that is not typical of the region.

The mill is a two-storey lofted building constructed from rubble stone with a slate gabled roof. It has timber lintels, and the windows have slate sills. Its original sash windows were replaced with casements in the 20th century. To the south, there is a drying kiln house that was built c. 1900. The north end of the mill has an iron undershot water wheel of approximately 5 m (16 ft) diameter with timber paddles driving one pair of stones for barley and one for oats. In 2010, the mill could only produce flour in high-river conditions.

The mill was designated as grade II* listed in 1975. A Building Preservation Order was served on Cenarth Mill in 1983.

== History ==
A mill in Cenarth was first recorded in the 1180s.

In 1298, it was held by the Prince of Wales and remained part of the royal estate until the early 17th century. From c. 1630, it was part of the estate of the Vaughans of Golden Grove until John Vaughan left his estate to John Campbell, 1st Baron Cawdor.

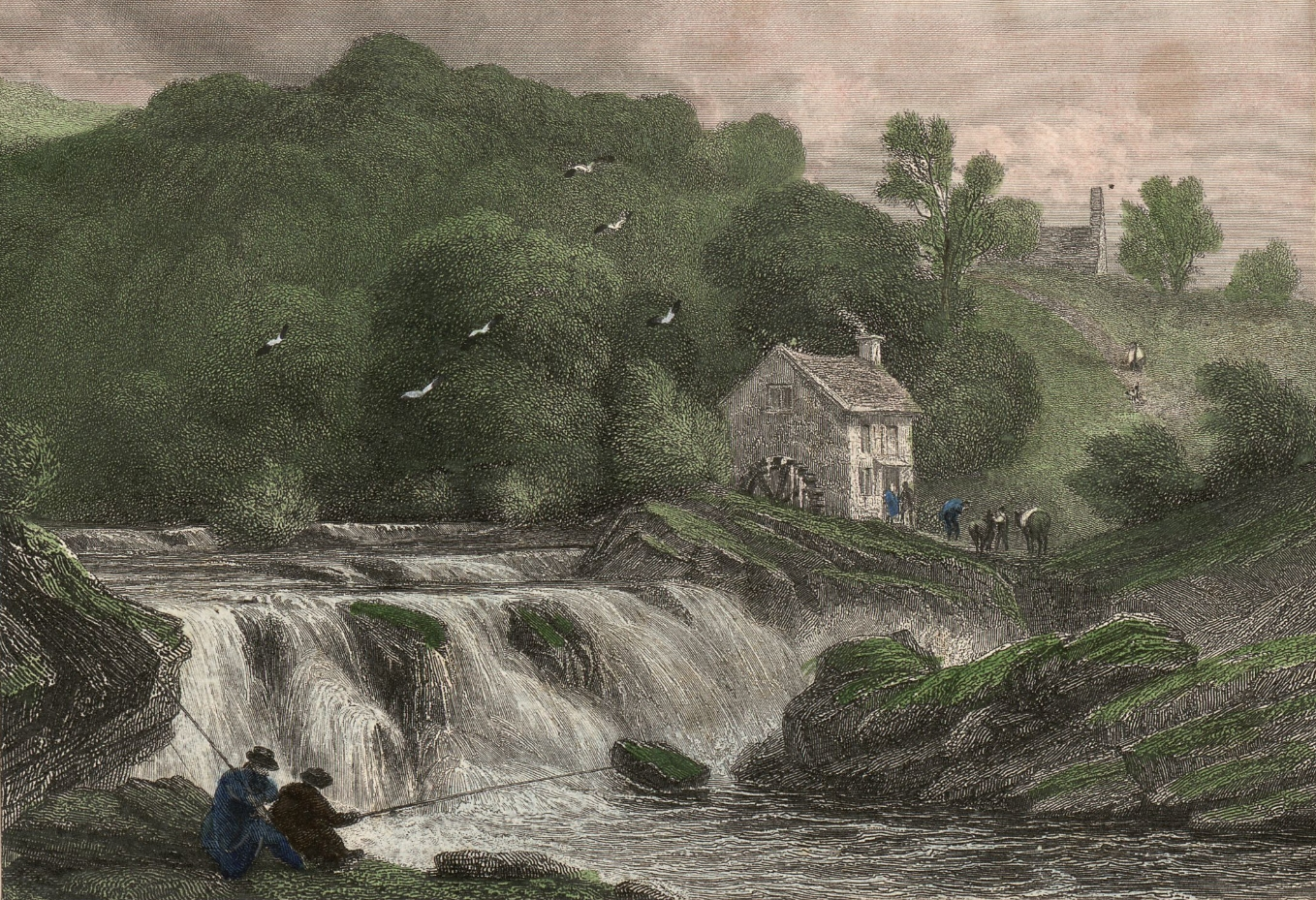
Engraving of Cenarth Mill from c.1830 by David Cox and William Radclyffe

The present building on the riverbank was built in the late 18th century. It retains a complete suite of machinery dating to the late 18th century or early 19th century, which was refurbished in the 19th century. The original wooden gears and shaft of the waterwheel have been replaced with cast-iron.

The mill was operational until 1939 and then operated as an attraction between 1954 and 1964. The Earls of Cawdor held it until 1970, renting out buildings via the Cawdor Estate Office. The mill was restored in 1984–1986.

It opened to the public in association with the National Coracle Centre. Planning permission was granted in 1989 to create a coracle museum in the mill, including a workshop for building coracles, which opened in 1990. Charles and Diana visited the mill on 27 August 1991, as part of their second honeymoon, caravaning around Britain.
