= Cwmcych =

Village in Carmarthenshire and Pembrokeshire, Wales

Coordinates: 51.9910°N 4.5137°W

Cwmcych: Welsh: Glyn Cuch
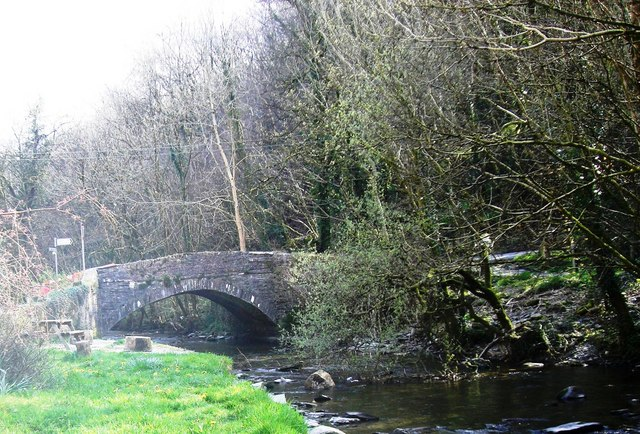
- Pont Cych, Cwmcych

- Location within Pembrokeshire
- OS grid reference: SN275355
- Civil parish: Cilrhedyn
- Community: Manordeifi
- Principal area: Pembrokeshire; Carmarthenshire
- Country: Wales
- Sovereign state: United Kingdom
- Post town: Newcastle Emlyn
- Postcode district: SA38
- Police: Dyfed-Powys
- Fire: Mid and West Wales
- Ambulance: Welsh
- UK Parliament: Caerfyrddin; Ceredigion Preseli

Cwmcych, Cwm Cych or Glyn Cuch (Welsh for 'Valley of the river Cych') is a small village in the upper Cych valley straddling the border between Carmarthenshire and Pembrokeshire, Wales, in the community of Manordeifi.

== Situation ==
The village is in the parish of Cilrhedyn, which also straddles the counties of Carmarthenshire and Pembrokeshire. The Afon Cych valley is wooded with steep sides and narrow lanes; after heavy rain in May 2002 part of the road to the south of Cwmcych fell 20 ft (6.1 m) into the river.

== Historic buildings ==
In the centre of the village is the Grade II listed bridge, Pont Cych, dated 1737 but probably rebuilt in the 19th century.

Until 2015 there was a long-standing pub called the Fox and Hounds; this has since become a private dwelling. Another building of historic significance is Pontcych Lodge, one of the several lodges of the Glaspant Manor estate frequently mentioned in the Glaspant Diary of 1896.

While most pre-20th century buildings date from the 19th century, older cottages in the village were built of stone or earth under thatched roofs. Some new housing has been built since the 1970s.

There were a number of mills in the vicinity for wool or sawing; they were operated by water power from Afon Cych and its tributaries; the mill upstream at Cwm Morgan, Dreifa Mills, has been restored.

There are no places of worship in Cwmcych but there are several chapels and the parish church within one or two miles (1.6 or 3.2 km).
