= Clydau =

Village, parish and community in Pembrokeshire, Wales

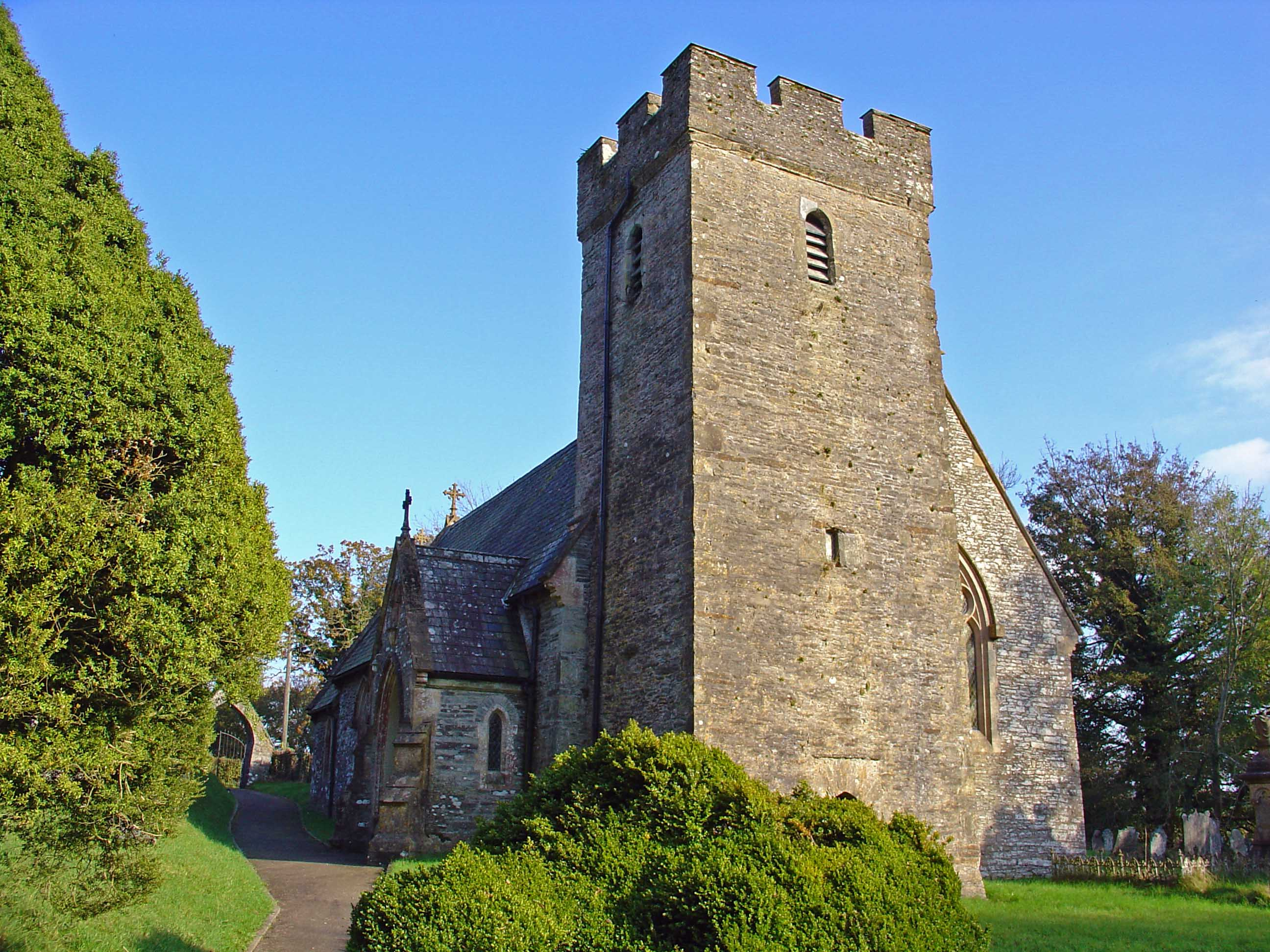
- Clydau parish church

- Location within Pembrokeshire
- Population: 715 (2011)
- Principal area: Pembrokeshire
- Country: Wales
- Sovereign state: United Kingdom
- Post town: LLANFYRNACH
- Postcode district: SA35
- Post town: BONCATH
- Postcode district: SA37
- Dialling code: 01239
- Police: Dyfed-Powys
- Fire: Mid and West Wales
- Ambulance: Welsh
- UK Parliament: Preseli Pembrokeshire
- Senedd Cymru – Welsh Parliament: Ceredigion Penfro
- List of places UK Wales Pembrokeshire 51.99°N 4.548889°W Map of the community

Clydau (sometimes Clydaï or Clydey) is a community and parish in Pembrokeshire, Wales.

== Name ==
The meaning of the Welsh placename is uncertain, although the church is now dedicated to St. Clydaï, an alleged daughter of Brychan.

== History ==
During the early Middle Ages, the settlement was the site of Llangeneu ('St Ceneus'), which was accounted one of the seven principal sees of Dyfed despite having no endowment of land.

Cledau (as Cledye) appears on a 1578 parish map of Pembrokeshire.

Erasmus Saunders (1670–1724), was born in Clydey; he was a Welsh priest and writer. Josiah Thomas Jones (1799-1873), republican and Welsh nationalist, was born at CwmHir Farm, Clydau. He went on to publish many books and established several newspapers in English and Welsh, including the Aberdare Times.

== Settlement ==
The settlement consists of a small group of properties around the parish church, 5 miles (8.0 km) southwest of Newcastle Emlyn and 8 miles (13 km) southeast of Cardigan.

== Community ==
Although the settlement of Clydau is tiny, the community is large, encompassing several other settlements and/or parishes including Bwlchygroes, Star, Tegryn, West Cilrhedyn and a large number of scattered farms. Clydau has its own elected community council and gives its name to an electoral ward of Pembrokeshire County Council. The electoral ward of Clydau covers the communities of Clydau and Boncath. In 2001 it had a population (2001) of 1,425, with 58% Welsh speakers, falling to 715 in 2011.

== Parish ==
The Afon Cneifa, a tributary of Afon Cych, divides the parish into two ancient divisions: Uwchlawrllan to the southeast and Islawrllan to the northwest. The population of the parish was 1,100 (1801), 1,457 (1851), 1,057 (1901), 829 (1951), 681 (2001), 715 (2011). The percentage of Welsh speakers was: 99 (1891), 97 (1931) and 91 (1971).

The 14th century Grade II-listed parish church is dedicated to Ste. Clydaï. It was rebuilt in the late 19th century, but the tower and some other parts of the building are original.
