= Charles Oswald Miles =

Anglican priest (1850–1898)

Charles Oswald Miles (30 May 1850 – 11 August 1898) was an Anglican priest.

== Early life ==
Miles was educated at Marlborough College and Trinity College, Oxford where he took an MA in Classics in 1875. He also attended Cuddesdon College in their fourth term of 1873 and terms one to three of 1874 where he trained for the priesthood.

== England ==
Miles was ordained deacon on 20 September 1874 by John Fielder Mackarness, Bishop of Oxford, and was curate of Banbury (1874–1876). He was ordained a priest, also by the Bishop of Oxford, on 19 September 1875 and became curate of Buckingham (1876–1877). He then sought opportunities abroad and sailed for South Africa in 1877.

== South Africa ==
Bishop Allan Becher Webb established the St Cyprian's Theological College in a building in St George's Street, Bloemfontein, in 1876, in the hopes of addressing some the needs of the still new, isolated, poor and sparsely populated Diocese of Bloemfontein. It opened in 1877, with Bishop Webb himself, Archdeacon Davis Croghan, the Revd K. Champernowne, and the Revd William Thomas Gaul as lecturers. Miles was recruited due to his Cuddesden connections to serve here as Theological Tutor and was Warden of the College from 1877–1882. "Native" students were tutored by the Revd William Crisp. The College was not, however, a success and served latterly only as a boarding house until that closed in 1883.

Whilst at the college, Miles also served as rector of St Cyprian's Church in Kimberley from 1881–1882.

Miles also served from 1880 to 1882 as a canon and the chancellor of the Anglican Diocese of the Free State under Bishop Webb.

Upon leaving South Africa, Miles left a considerable library of books which went to form part of the diocesan library in Bloemfontein.

== Return to England ==
Afterwards he returned to England, where he had to start his ordained ministry as a curate at St Margaret of Antioch's Church, Barley, Hertfordshire, from 1882 to 1884, then becoming Vicar of St Mary's Shirehampton from 1884 to 1888 before moving to be Vicar of Almondsbury in 1888.

== Family ==
Miles was the son of the Reverend Robert Miles (1818–1883), the rector of Bingham in Nottinghamshire, and grandson of Philip John Miles (1773–1845) by his second marriage to Clarissa Peach (1790–1868). Philip John Miles was an English landowner, banker, merchant, politician and collector, who was elected MP for Bristol from 1835 – 1837 having earlier been elected for Westbury from 1820 – 1826 and Corfe Castle from 1829 – 1832. Charles Miles was therefore brother of Frank Miles and of Robert Miles, cousin of Philip Napier Miles and half-cousin of Sir Philip Miles, 2nd Baronet. He cared for his brother, Frank, during his final four years at Brislington Asylum and was Administrator to Frank's estate after his death. Miles bequeathed £3,600 13s 8d (£3million in 2008 terms) to his wife when he died in 1898, by comparison his cousin, Sir Cecil Miles, 3rd Baronet, left £171,591 17s 4d (£145million in 2008 terms) in the same year.

Miles and his wife, Fanny Jane Miles, had a son, Allen Oswald Miles (2nd Lt, 13th (Service) Bn (Forest of Dean)(Pioneers), Gloucestershire Regiment), who was killed in France on 30 June 1916, aged 27. He had been educated at Pembroke Lodge Preparatory School, Southbourne, Hants, Lancing College and Trinity College, Oxford where he took an M.A, becoming one of the masters at Pembroke Lodge. He had enlisted in December 1914 in the Royal Navy Volunteer Reserves.
