= Cenarth =

Village in Carmarthenshire, Wales

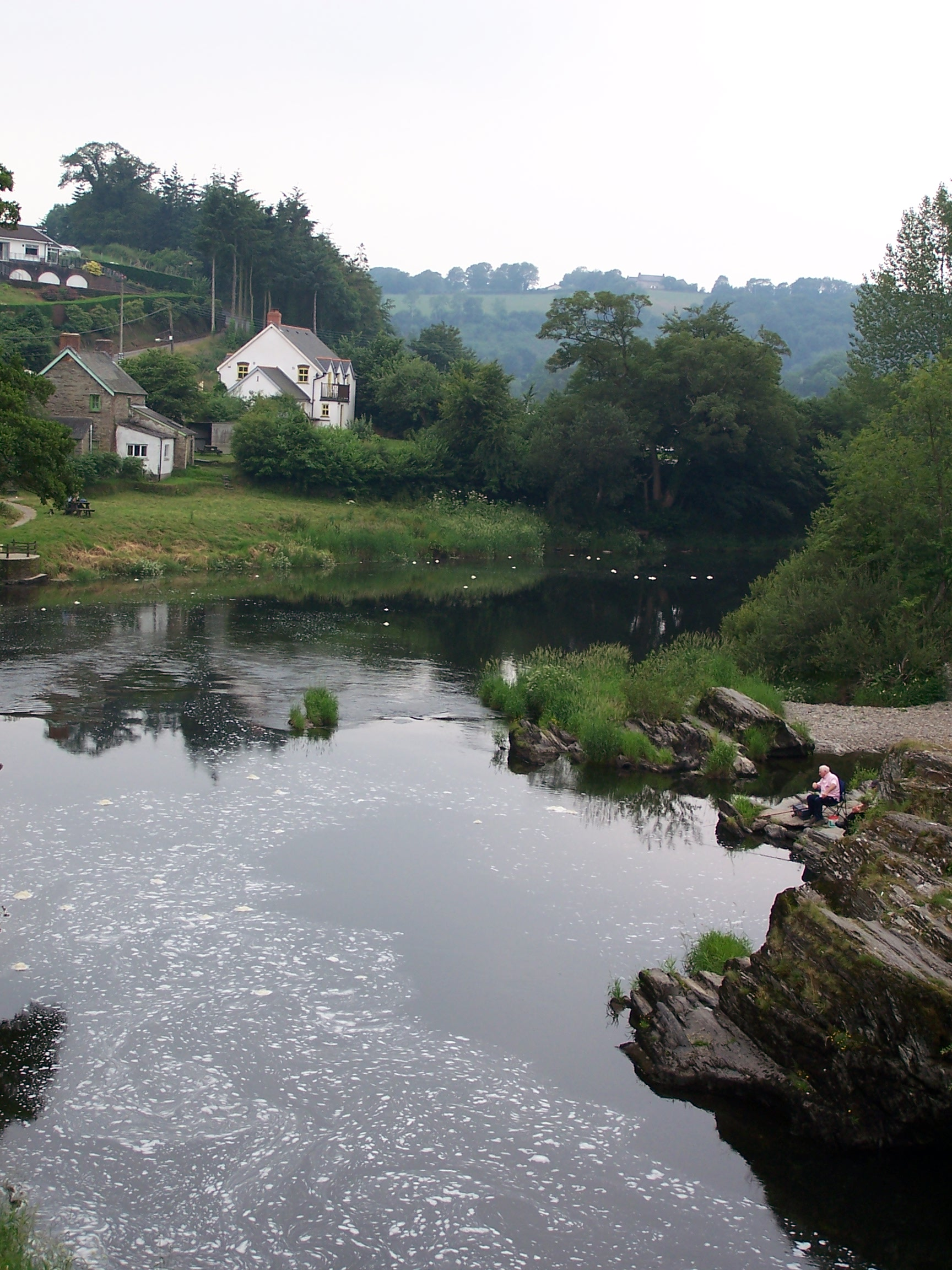
- View of River Teifi downstream (westwards) from Cenarth Bridge

- Location within Carmarthenshire
- Population: 1,030 (2011)
- OS grid reference: SN268416
- Community: Cenarth
- Principal area: Carmarthenshire
- Preserved county: Dyfed
- Country: Wales
- Sovereign state: United Kingdom
- Post town: NEWCASTLE EMLYN
- Postcode district: SA38
- Dialling code: 01239
- Police: Dyfed-Powys
- Fire: Mid and West Wales
- Ambulance: Welsh
- UK Parliament: Caerfyrddin
- Senedd Cymru – Welsh Parliament: Carmarthen East and Dinefwr
- List of places UK Wales Carmarthenshire 52.046°N 4.527°W Map of the community

Cenarth (Welsh pronunciation) is a village, parish and community in Carmarthenshire, on the border between Ceredigion and Carmarthenshire, and close to the border with Pembrokeshire, Wales. It stands on the banks of the River Teifi, 6 miles (9.7 km) east of Cardigan and 4 miles (6.4 km) west of Newcastle Emlyn, and features the Cenarth Falls, a popular visitor attraction, and several other listed structures, including Cenarth Mill, an 18th-century corn mill incorporating the National Coracle Centre.

== History and governance ==
The ancient parish extended south of the river, and included the town of Newcastle Emlyn. In 1934, it annexed the adjoining parish of East Cilrhedyn, and the enlarged parish corresponds with the modern community, which had a population of 1,022 in the 2001 census. With the community of Newcastle Emlyn, it makes up the Carmarthenshire electoral ward of Cenarth, which had a population of 1,995 in 2001, with 60 per cent Welsh language speakers. The ancient parish (less Newcastle Emlyn) had an area of 6,420 acres (2,600 ha). Its census populations were: 672 (1801); 897 (1851); 638 (1901). The percentage of Welsh-speakers was 98 (1891); 96 (1931).

The enlarged parish (post-1934) had an area of 12,100 acres (4,900 ha). Its census populations were: 1098 (1951); 1066 (1961); 926 (1971); 971 (1981). The percentage of Welsh-speakers was 92 (1951); 91 (1961); 82 (1971); 69 (1981).

The community is bordered by the communities of: Newcastle Emlyn; Llangeler; Cynwyl Elfed; and Trelech, all being in Carmarthenshire; by Clydau and Manordeifi in Pembrokeshire; and by Beulah and Llandyfriog in Ceredigion.

== Features ==
East of the village, the River Teifi emerges from a deep ravine over a ledge that produces a spectacular waterfall when the river is in full spate and this attracts many visitors throughout the year. A dramatic painting of the falls was made by Frank Miles and is now at Nottingham City Museum. Miles's father inherited Cardigan Priory from his father, Philip John Miles, but lived in Nottinghamshire as Rector of Bingham.

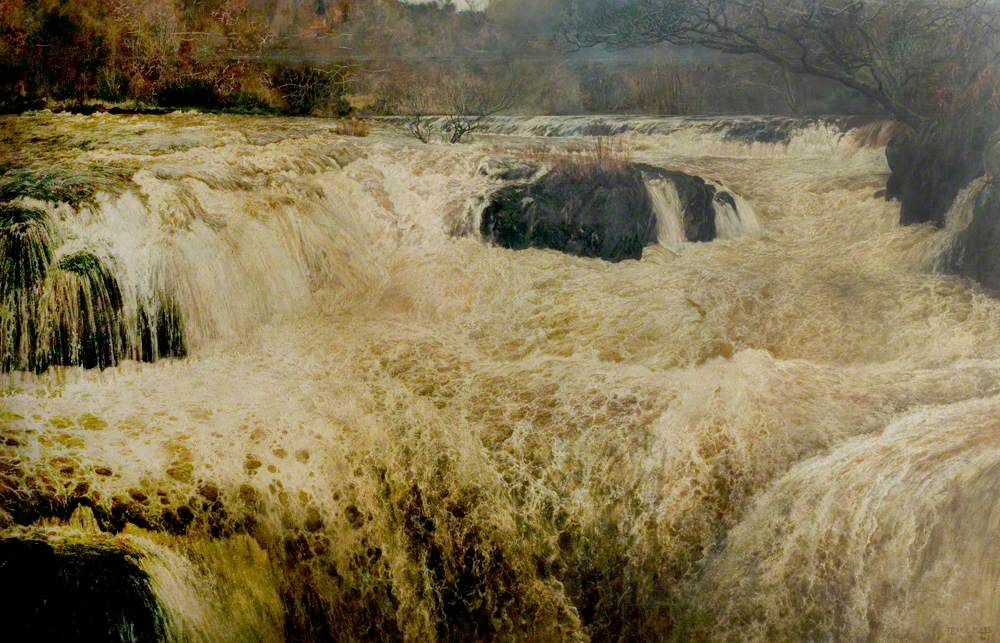
Salmon Leap at Cenarth Falls, by George Francis Miles

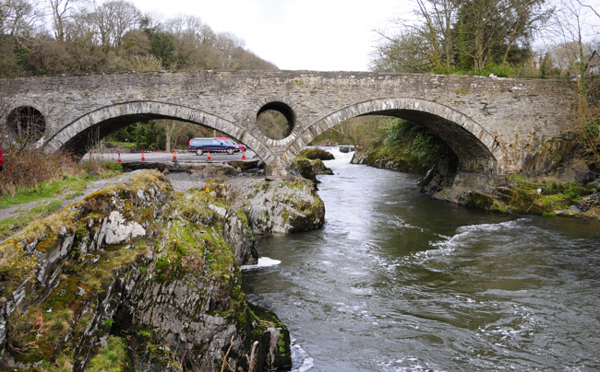
Cenarth Bridge viewed from the west

A dominant feature of the village is Cenarth Bridge over the Teifi west of the falls; the bridge was built in 1787 by William Edwards of Eglwysilan and his son David. The bridge features their trademark series of circular holes (perforated spandrels that allow the weight of the structure to be reduced without losing strength. The bridge is a Grade II*-listed structure and is partly in Carmarthenshire and partly in Ceredigion.

Other visitor attractions are a seventeenth-century flour mill and coracle museum. The village is home to the National Coracle Centre.

== Worship ==
The parish church is dedicated to the local saint, St Llawddog. Although the present building is relatively modern, it is on an important ancient site, and was the "bishop house" of the cantref of Emlyn.
