= The Aberdare Leader =

The Aberdare Leader was a weekly English-language newspaper that was published between 1902 and 1991 in south Wales. It circulated in the Aberdare Valley, Mountain Ash, Merthyr Tydfil, Pontypridd and Glyn Neath.

The main content of the paper was local news. Between 1902 and 1967 the proprietors of the Aberdare Leader were W. Pugh and J. L. Rowlands, with the Celtic Press being the subsequent proprietor.

Welsh Newspapers Online has digitised almost 800 issues of the Aberdare Leader (1902–1919) from the newspaper holdings of the National Library of Wales.

== See also ==
- The Aberdare Times (1869)
