= Ceneu =

Welsh saint and bishop

Saint Ceneu
- Patronage: Clydau

Saint Ceneu (Old Welsh: Keneu) was an early bishop of Menevia (St Davids) in Wales in the sixth century. Giraldus Cambrensis, writing in the twelfth century, stated that Ceneu was the third bishop.

He is said to have been the son of Corun ap Ceredig or Coel Hen. He established a church or monastic community (clas) at the site of the current settlement of Clydau in North Pembrokeshire which was long known as Llangeneu (Church of Ceneu) in his honour. No traces of the settlement are known to survive, and are thought to have been destroyed when there was significant immigration by Flemings settling into the area.

His feast day is 15 June.
