= Pont Cych =

Bridge in Wales

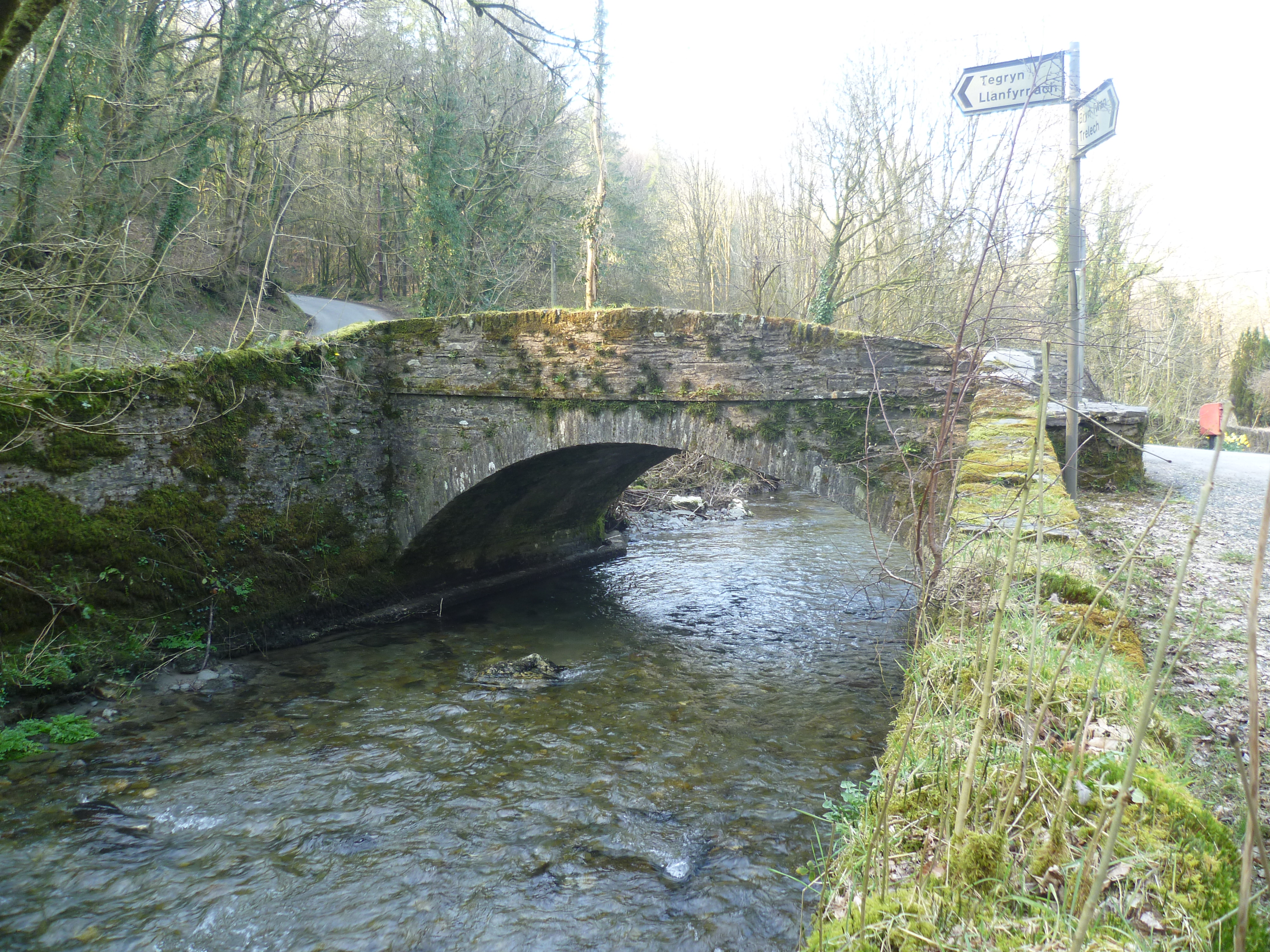
- Pont Cych from upstream
- Coordinates: 51.9971°N 4.5136°W
- Carries: Unclassified lane
- Crosses: Afon Cych
- Locale: Cwmcych, West Wales
- Heritage status: Grade II

Characteristics
- Design: Arch bridge

History
- Construction end: 1737; 289 years ago

Location
- Interactive map of Pont Cych

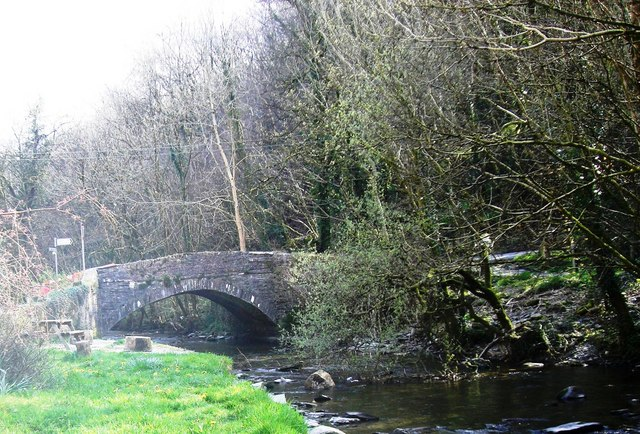
Pont Cych (from downstream)

Pont Cych is a single-arch, Grade II-listed bridge over Afon Cych at Cwmcych in the Cych Valley, bordering Carmarthenshire and Pembrokeshire, Wales.

== History ==
The bridge was rebuilt in 1737 (indicating an earlier bridge existed) and probably rebuilt in the 19th century.

The CADW citation says:

Rubble stone single arch bridge with stone voussoirs to arch rings and projecting flat string course over the arch. Ramped rubble stone parapet and rubble stone abutments each side. Datestone reads 'This bridge rebuilt by both counties. Is Harries, H Howells, overseers. MDCCXXXVII'.

It was listed as the best example of the several bridges over Afon Cych. It carries a minor road that leads to the village of Llanfyrnach from the Cych valley.

The bridge, opposite the former Fox and Hounds inn, was a meeting place for the Tivyside Hounds for fox hunting in the late 19th century.

The north parapet of the bridge carries an Ordnance Survey cut mark, marking a point 46.47 metres (152.5 ft) above mean sea level.

There is a recently working hydro-power installation at the bridge, according to the British Hydropower Association's 2014 map of the UK. In 2017, it caused some concern from Natural Resources Wales in respect of its construction design.
