= Cenarth Falls =

Waterfall in Ceredigion/Carmarthenshire, Wales

Coordinates: 52.0457°N 4.5238°W

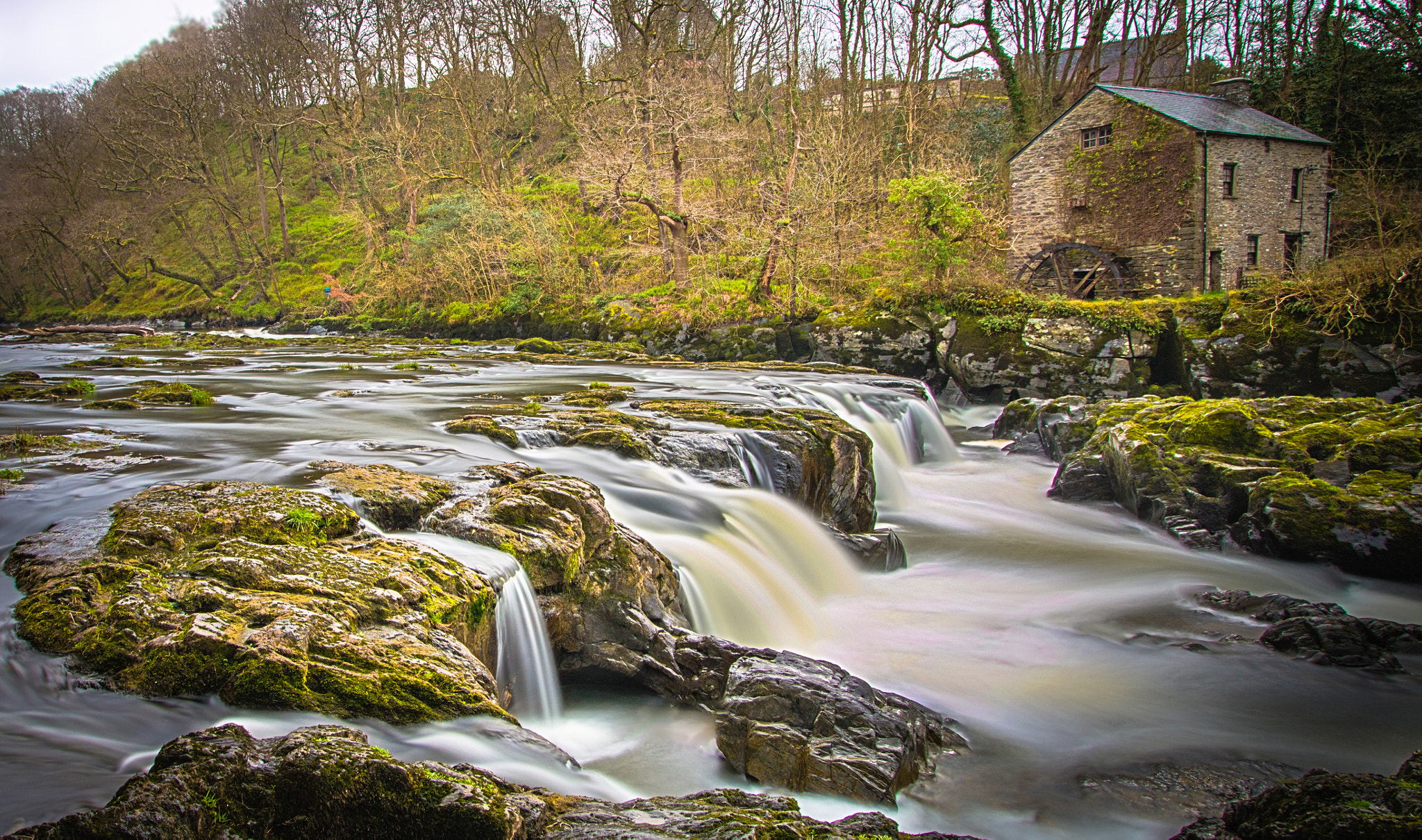
Cenarth Falls West Wales, old mill with waterwheel on right

The Cenarth Falls is a cascade of waterfalls just upstream of the road bridge in the village of Cenarth in Ceredigion, bordering Carmarthenshire and Pembrokeshire, Wales. It is notable as the first significant barrier on the River Teifi that salmon and migratory sea trout encounter on their return to their home river as they make their way upstream to spawn. Because of this, and the very attractive setting of the falls in a natural wooded valley, the falls have become a significant visitor attraction in Ceredigion, including in the autumn when the fish can be watched leaping up the falls.

== History ==
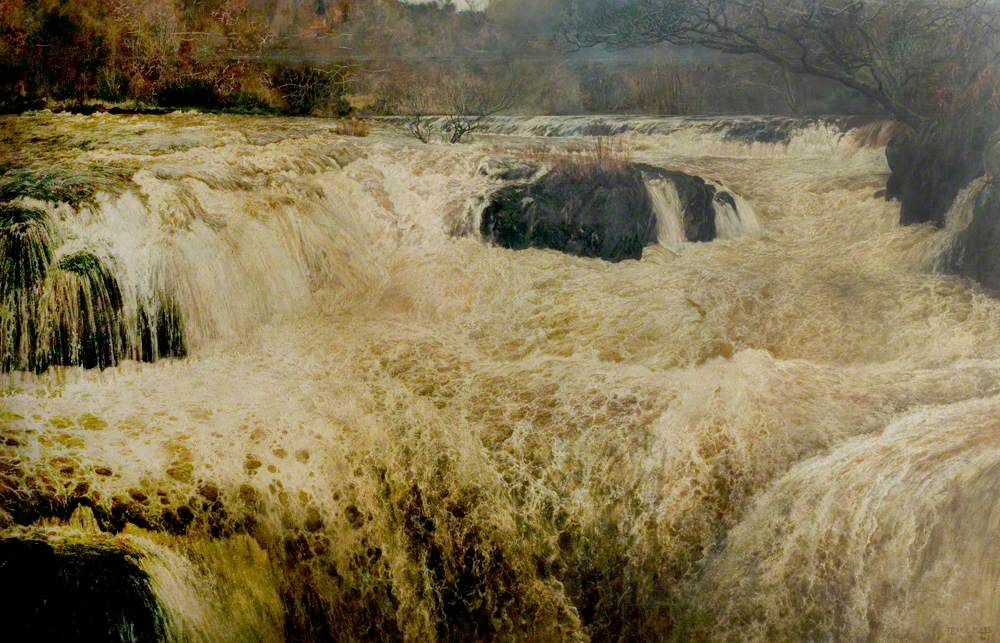
Salmon Leap at Cenarth Falls, by George Francis Miles

A water wheel-powered mill is known to have been at Cenarth Falls from the 13th century, first recorded in 1298 when Edward I became Lord of the Manor of Cenarth. The current two storey mill building, Cenarth Mill, dates from the later 18th century. It was a working concern until 1939. In the 19th and early 20th centuries a leat drew water from behind the falls to power a watermill situated just upstream of the falls on the southern bank. A restoration between 1954 and 1964 led to the mill operating as a tourist attraction, with a further restoration in the mid-1980s. It still houses a full suite of late 1700/early 1800s mill machinery.

A dramatic painting of the falls was made in 1878 by artist Frank Miles and is now at Nottingham City Museum. Miles's father inherited Cardigan Priory from his father, Philip John Miles, but lived in Nottinghamshire as Rector of Bingham.

The less well-known Henllan Falls a few miles upstream of Cenarth provides similar opportunities to watch fish migration.

== Gallery ==
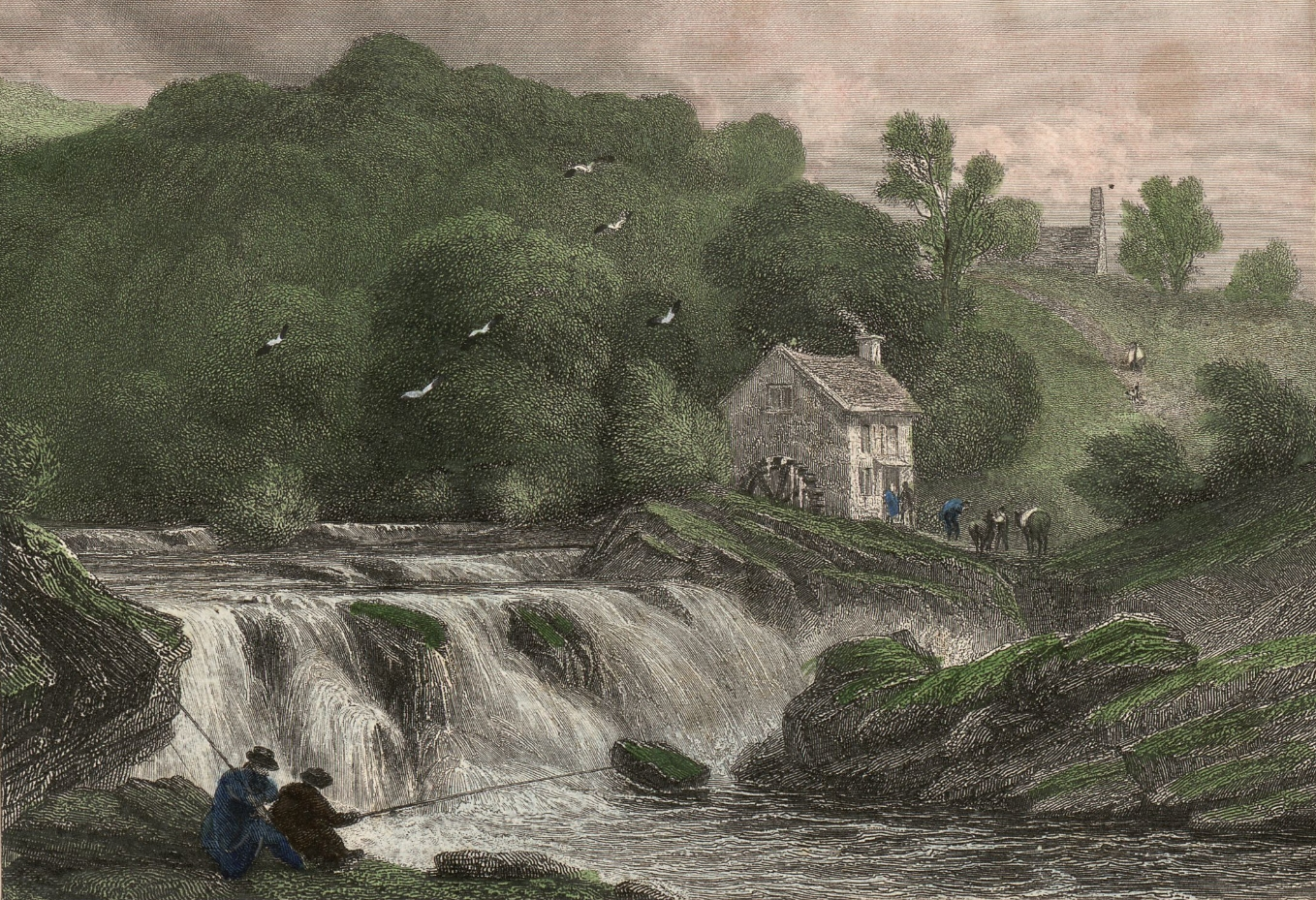
Salmon leap on the Teify - 1830 by David Cox (1783–1859) engraved by William Radclyffe, (1783 or 1796-1855)

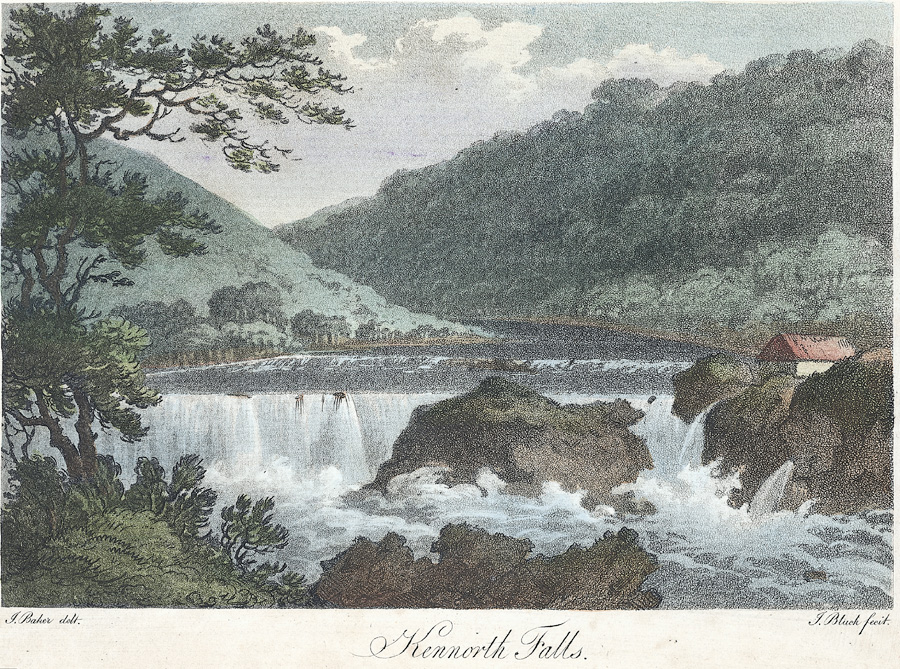
"Kennorth Falls" 18th century aquatint by James Baker, printed by J Bluck, held in collection of National Library of Wales.

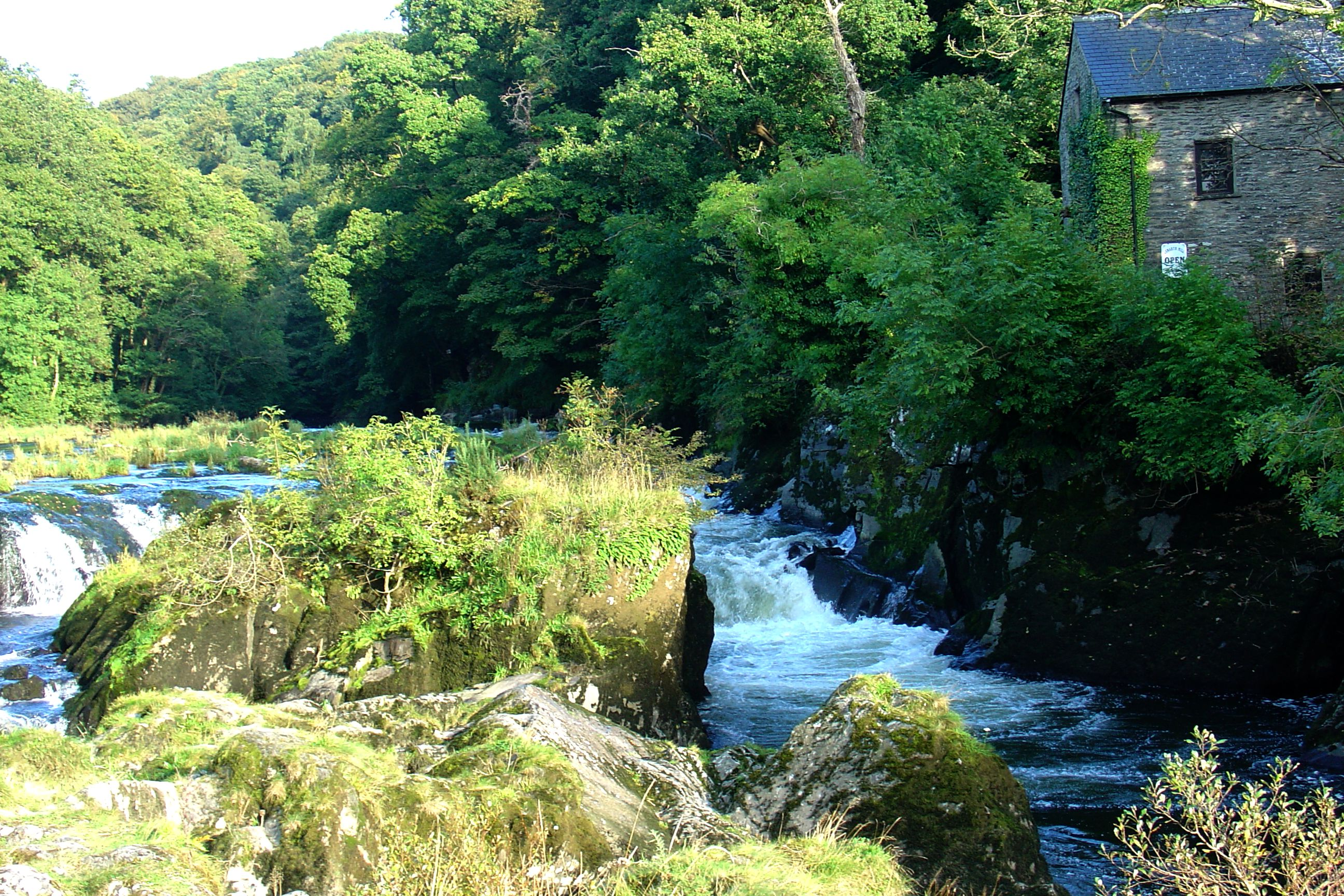
The Cenarth Falls and old mill

== See also ==
- List of waterfalls
- List of waterfalls in Wales
