= Pont Treseli =

Bridge in Pembrokeshire, Wales

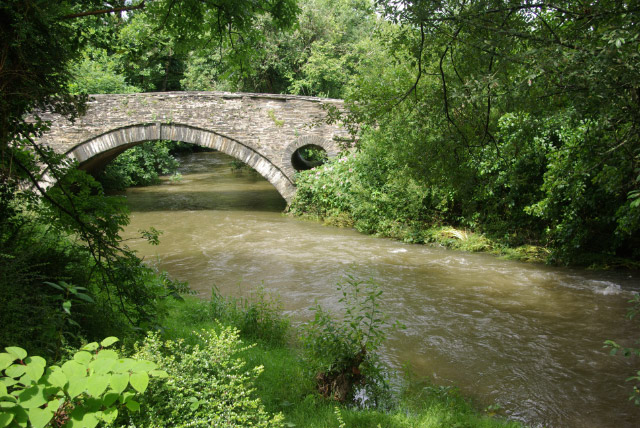
- Pont Treseli, Abercych
- Coordinates: 52.0311°N 4.5512°W
- Carries: B4332 road
- Crosses: Afon Cych
- Locale: Abercych, West Wales
- Heritage status: Grade II

Characteristics
- Design: Arch bridge

Location
- Interactive map of Pont Treseli

Pont Treseli or Pont Tre-seli is a Grade II-listed single-arch stone bridge spanning Afon Cych at Abercych, Pembrokeshire, Wales. It carries the B4332 road across the boundary between Pembrokeshire and Carmarthenshire. Pont Treseli was also the name of one of several discrete settlements that now make up the linear village of Abercych.

The bridge was built in the late 18th or early 19th century from rubble stone and the parapets have slate coping. It has perforated spandrels similar to, and probably derived from, Cenarth Bridge; these function during peak river flow to reduce stress on the bridge structure. The roadway is 18 feet (5.5 m) wide.
