= Bwlchygroes =

Village in Pembrokeshire, Wales

Coordinates: 51.995°N 4.564°W

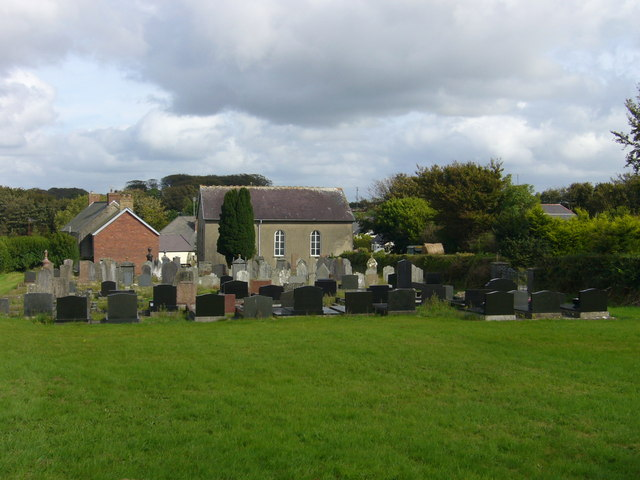
- Bwlchygroes Chapel

- Location within Pembrokeshire
- OS grid reference: SN240360
- Community: Clydau
- Principal area: Pembrokeshire
- Country: Wales
- Sovereign state: United Kingdom
- Post town: Llanfyrnach
- Postcode district: SA35
- Dialling code: 01239
- Police: Dyfed-Powys
- Fire: Mid and West Wales
- Ambulance: Welsh

Bwlchygroes (Welsh pronunciation; sometimes spelled Bwlch-y-groes) is a small upland rural village in the community and parish of Clydau, north Pembrokeshire, Wales, 5 miles (8 km) SW of Newcastle Emlyn and the same distance east of Crymych.

== Community ==
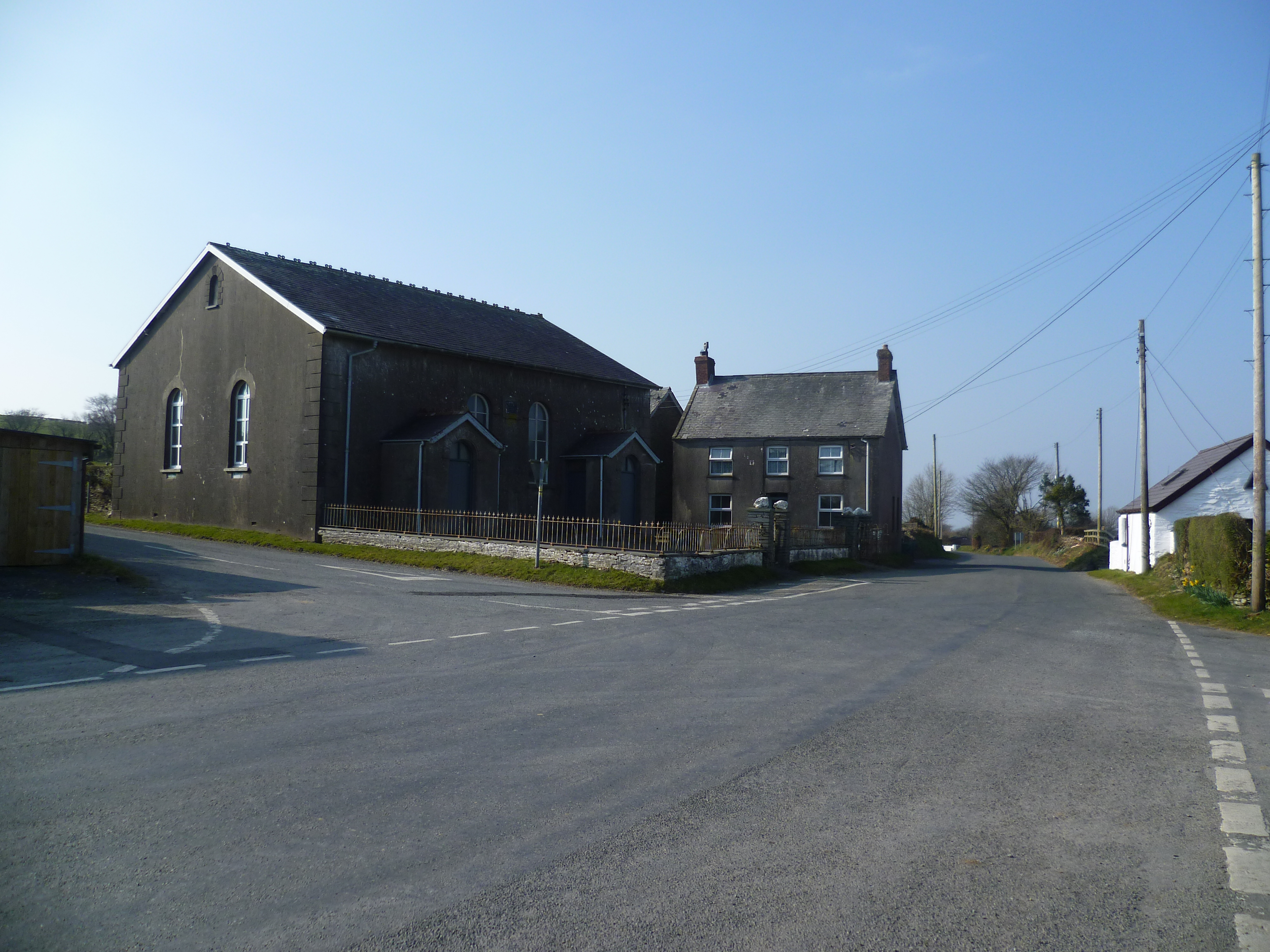
Bwlchygroes crossroads from the SE

Bwlchygroes Community Hall occupies part of the former village school, which closed in 2000. Clydau School, in Tegryn, now serves pupils from Bwlchygroes. School records for 100 years to 1967 are held at the Pembrokeshre Record Office. The village post office closed in 2008. Bwlch-y-Groes Women's Institute papers 1964-2009 are held by Pembrokeshire Record Office.

== Chapel ==
There is a Calvinist Methodist chapel in the village, dating from 1777; date stones bear several later dates.

== Amenities ==
There is an agricultural merchant in the village as well as holiday accommodation. The old school is the headquarters of the Green Dragon community bus and scooter scheme, funded by the Welsh Government, and is home to the nursery group (ysgol feithrin).

== Notability ==
Daniel Blackburn was one of the pioneers for using cooking oil as vehicle fuel in the early 2000s.

Osian Hedd Harries of Bwlchygroes was one of six who repainted the Cofiwch Dryweryn mural in Llanrhystud, Ceredigion, after it was defaced with a “Elvis” graffiti early February 2019.

Bwlchygroes was rated the 6th safest place in Wales in 2014, according to data from UKCrimeStats.
