= Cilrhedyn =

Village and parish in Pembrokeshire and Carmarthenshire, Wales

- Location within Pembrokeshire
- OS grid reference: SN277350
- Community: Clydau; Cenarth
- Principal area: Pembrokeshire; Carmarthenshire
- Country: Wales
- Sovereign state: United Kingdom
- Police: Dyfed-Powys
- Fire: Mid and West Wales
- Ambulance: Welsh
- UK Parliament: Ceredigion Preseli; Caerfyrddin
- Senedd Cymru – Welsh Parliament: Preseli Pembrokeshire; Carmarthen West and South Pembrokeshire

Cilrhedyn is a hamlet and parish in the counties of Carmarthenshire and Pembrokeshire, Wales, in the hill country to the south of the Teifi valley. The Afon Cych divides it into two unequal parts: West Cilrhedyn, Pembrokeshire and East Cilrhedyn, Carmarthenshire. The parish church is in West Cilrhedyn.

== Name ==
The placename is Welsh, meaning "bracken nook". The area is largely Welsh-speaking. The parish appeared on a 1578 parish map of Pembrokeshire as Kilryden.

== West Cilrhedyn ==
The parish of West Cilrhedyn (Pembrokeshire) is now part of the community of Clydau. It had an area of 887 Ha, and consisted entirely of scattered farms. Its census populations were: 215 (1801): 257 (1851): 190 (1901): 127 (1951): 105 (1981). The percentage Welsh speakers was 100 (1891); 97 (1931); 94 (1971).

== East Cilrhedyn ==
The parish of East Cilrhedyn (Carmarthenshire) was merged with the parish of Cenarth in 1934, and it is now part of the community of Cenarth. It had an area of 2238 Ha, and included the villages of Capel Iwan 51°59′55″N 4°29′32″W and Cwmorgan 51°59′12″N 4°29′8″W. Its census populations were: 517 (1801): 806 (1851): 691 (1901): 570 (1931). The percentage Welsh speakers was 100 (1891); 99 (1931).
