= National Coracle Centre =

Museum in Cenarth, Wales

Coordinates: 52.0456°N 4.5259°W

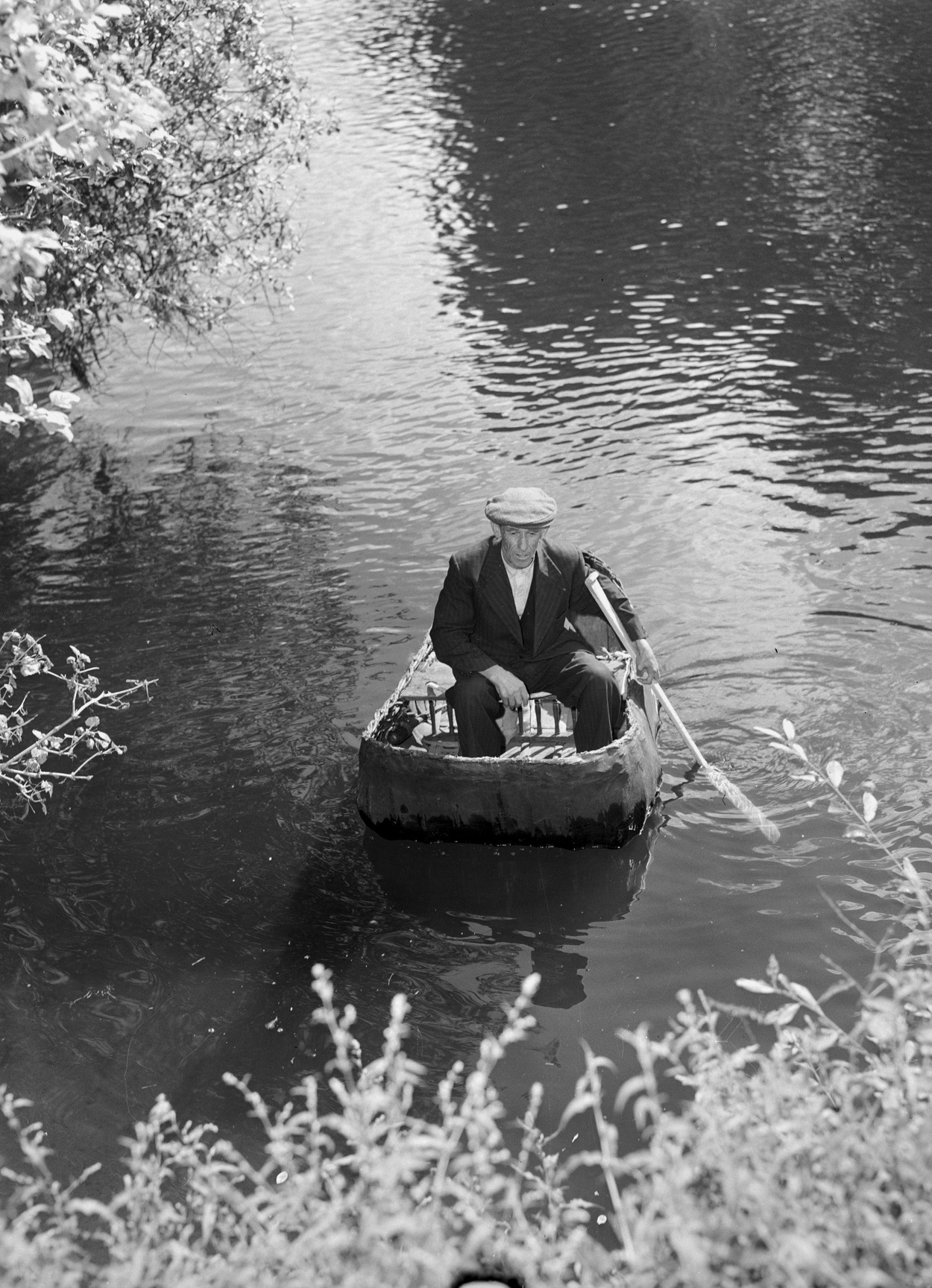
Man in a coracle on the River Teifi

The National Coracle Centre is a museum in Cenarth, Carmarthenshire dedicated to coracles. It opened in 1991, and displays coracles from around the world including Tibetan and Iraqi examples as well as those from Britain.

== Background ==
The coracle, known as "cwrwgl" in Welsh, is a type of boat, made for one person from woven wood, with animals skins as a waterproof covering. The boats were used in the UK around 2000 years ago, originating in Roman times, but are found around the world. They are still used today for fishing on the River Teifi, the River Towy, and the River Taf.

The museum was opened in 1991 by Martin Fowler. The museum is based in a restored 17th century water mill, which Fowler began restoring in 1984. The museum teaches visitors about the history of coracles and coracle making, displaying examples of the boats from across the world, including Tibet, India, Vietnam, United States and Iraq. They also offer workshops on coracle making.

An item of particular interest in the museum is a Vietnamese coracle made from woven bamboo, used by refugees to escape across the South China Sea to Hong Kong. The coracle was donated to the centre by the Exeter Maritime Museum. Another item of interest is a boat from North Dakota made by the Hidatsa people using a willow frame and a buffalo hide.

The museum also looks at the history of poaching, and displays the tools and methods used for illegal fishing, an activity often done in coracles.
