= The Aberdare Times =

Welsh weekly newspaper

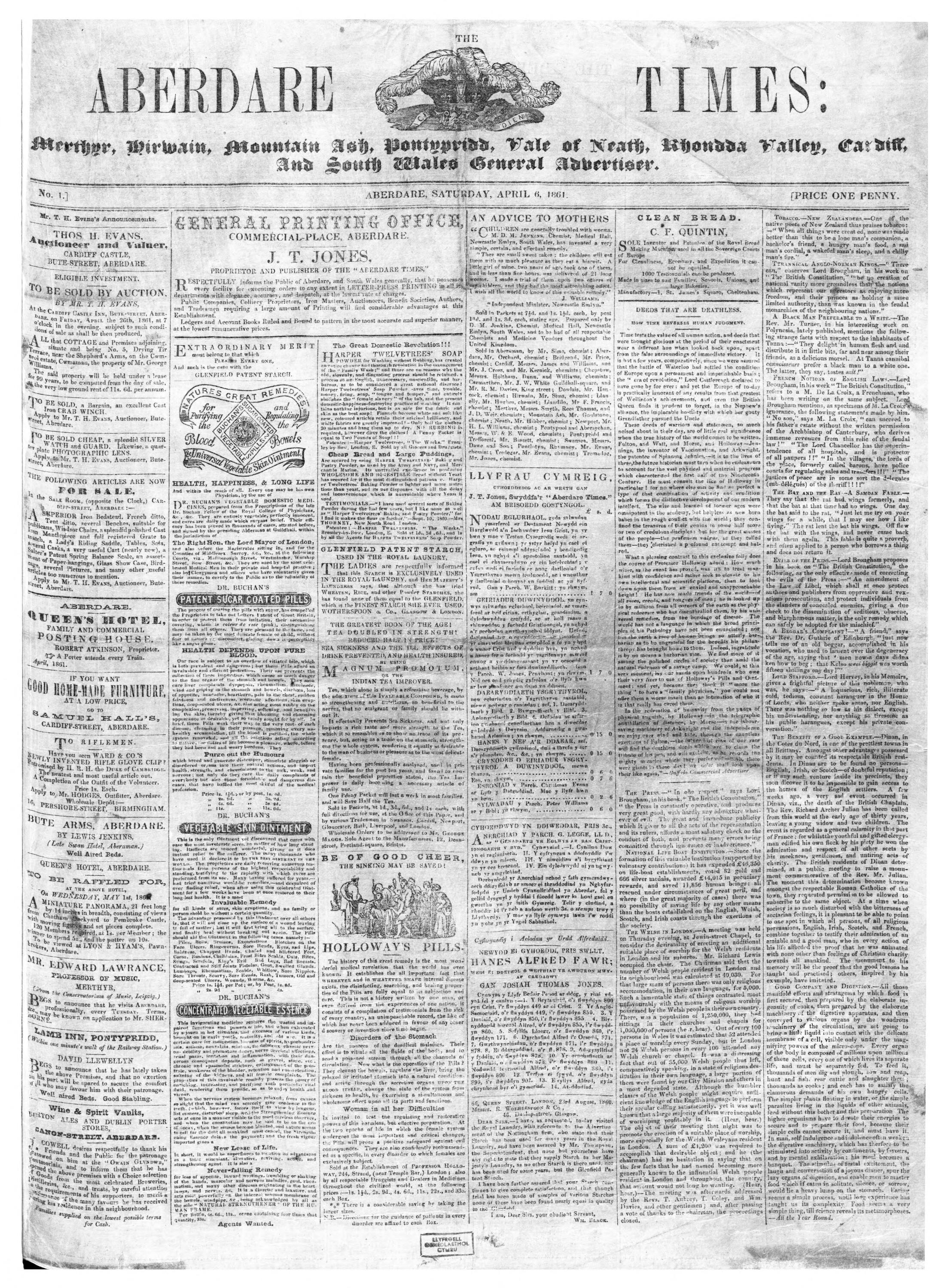
- The Aberdare times: Merthyr, Hirwain, Mountain Ash, Pontypridd, Vale of Neath, Rhondda Valley, Cardiff, and South Wales general advertiser
- Type: weekly newspaper
- Publisher: Josiah Thomas Jones
- Editor: Josiah Thomas Jones[*]
- Launched: 6 April 1861
- City: Aberdare
- Country: Wales
- OCLC number: 751651252

The Aberdare Times was a weekly English-language newspaper based in south Wales. Its circulation was mainly in Merthyr Tydfil, Hirwaun, Mountain Ash, Pontypridd, Neath Valley, Rhondda and Cardiff.

The paper had Labour/Liberal tendencies and its main content was local news. At its inception, Josiah Thomas Jones (1799–1873) was the owner, publisher and editor.

Welsh Newspapers Online has digitised more than 1,700 issues of the Aberdare Times (1861–1902) from the National Library of Wales's newspaper collection.

== See also ==
- The Gwron (1856–1860)
- The Aberdare Leader (1902–1991)
