= Tegryn =

Village in Pembrokeshire, Wales

Coordinates: 51.97°N 4.58°W

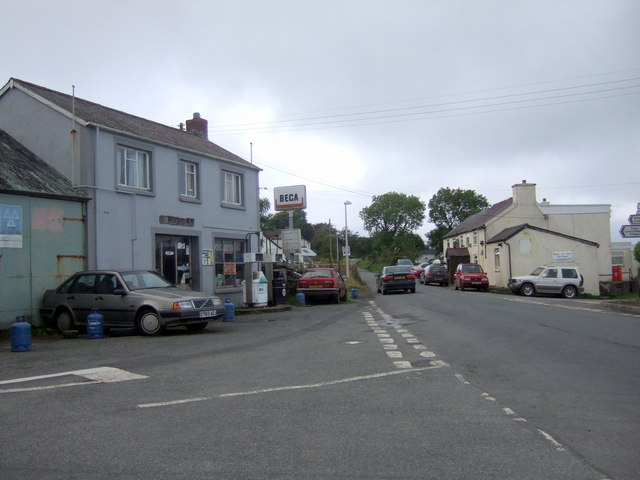
- Tegryn village centre and Butchers Arms (right)

- Location within Pembrokeshire
- OS grid reference: SN229331
- Community: Clydau
- Principal area: Pembrokeshire
- Country: Wales
- Sovereign state: United Kingdom
- Post town: Llanfyrnach
- Postcode district: SA35
- Dialling code: 01239
- Police: Dyfed-Powys
- Fire: Mid and West Wales
- Ambulance: Welsh
- UK Parliament: Preseli Pembrokeshire
- Senedd Cymru – Welsh Parliament: Preseli Pembrokeshire

Tegryn is a hilltop linear village in north Pembrokeshire, Wales, in the community and parish of Clydau and is the largest settlement in the community.

It is at the eastern end of the Preseli Mountains, 1 mile (1.6 km) north of Llanfyrnach, with much of the village around 250 metres (820 ft) above sea level.

== Description ==
Tegryn is a village in the north Pembrokeshire community of Clydau and is home to the Clydau Community Centre (Canolfan Clydau), a charity. It was opened in November 2014 and cost £600,000.

The village has a pub, the Butchers Arms, and a garage, with Post Office services at the Community Centre.

== Education ==
In 1860 a schoolroom was built near the chapel. The present school in Tegryn is Ysgol Clydau Primary School. A 2008-9 Estyn report described the school as having a strong Welsh ethos; there were 63 pupils between 4 and 11 years old, and a third of pupils used Welsh as a main language at home.

In 2014 there were 53 children at the school. In 2025, the council voted to close the school in 2026 and transfer pupils to Ysgol Bro Preseli in Crymych because of a decline in the number of pupils.

== Worship ==
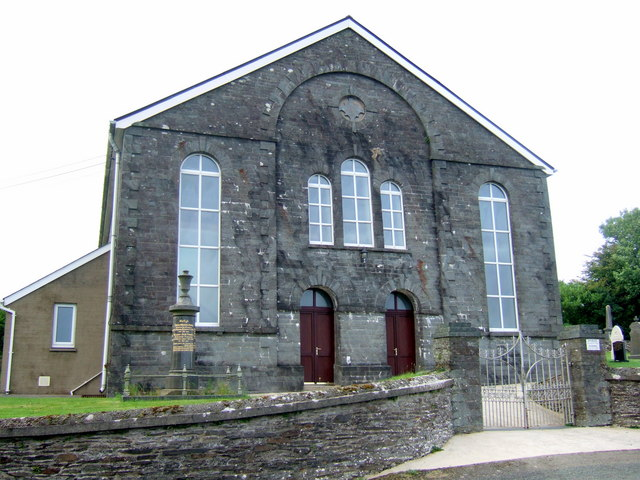
Llwynyrhwrdd Chapel; there were separate doors for men and women

A Welsh Independent chapel was established at Llwyn-yr-hwrdd to the south of the village in 1805. It was rebuilt in 1817 and 1846, and in 1873 it had a membership of 335.
