= Frank Miles =

British artist (1852–1891)

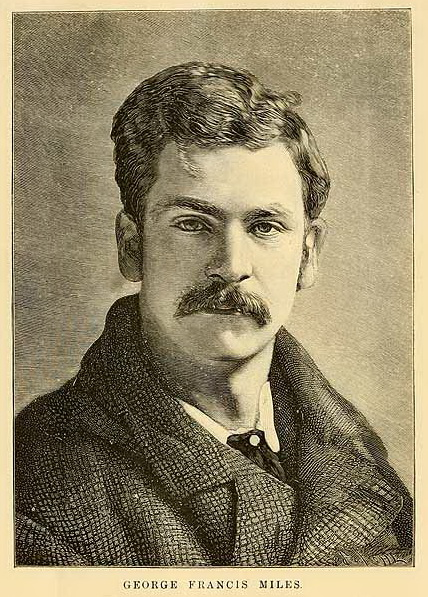

George Francis Miles (22 April 1852 – 15 July 1891) was a London-based British artist who specialised in pastel portraits of society ladies, also an architect and a keen plantsman. He was the artist in chief of the magazine Life, and between 1877 and 1887 he contributed text and botanical illustrations to The Garden, a weekly journal published in London by William Robinson.

== Life and career ==
George Miles was the son of the Rev. Robert Henry William Miles (1818–1883), rector of the Church of St. Mary and All Angels, Bingham, Nottinghamshire, and his wife Mary Ellen (née Cleaver). He was the grandson of Philip John Miles (1773–1845) by his second marriage to Clarissa Peach (1790–1868). Philip John Miles was an English landowner, banker, merchant, politician and collector, who was elected MP for Bristol from 1835 to 1837 having earlier been elected for Westbury from 1820 to 1826 and Corfe Castle from 1829 to 1832. Frank Miles was therefore brother of Charles Oswald Miles, cousin of Philip Napier Miles and half-cousin of Sir Philip Miles, 2nd Baronet.

Today, Frank Miles is best known as a friend of Oscar Wilde whom he met at Oxford in 1874 or 1875, where Miles had family connections to the colleges and friends. He was never an undergraduate after being schooled at home, rather than at Eton as his father and uncles were. Miles introduced Wilde to Lillie Langtry, and to his friend and patron Lord Ronald Charles Sutherland-Leveson-Gower, who later became the model for the worldly Lord Henry Wotton in Wilde's 1890 novel The Picture of Dorian Gray.

In the year leading up to his final illness, Miles was engaged to be married to Miss Gratiana Lucy Hughes (known as Lucy), daughter of Alfred Hughes (later Sir Alfred Hughes, 10th Baronet), of East Bergholt Lodge, Suffolk, but his incarceration led to this falling through. A letter of 1887 from Miles to the wife of the artist George Broughton reads:

...As soon as I have given up my house for three years, I and my girl will find a cottage and live close to London... we think of the S.E. edge of Epping Forest... L and I expect we shall have many friends... we shall be near the best nursery gardens – and I spend half my life growing new rose plants I introduce and send to Kew. ... soon a baronetcy, when an old man dies, will come to my future father in law.

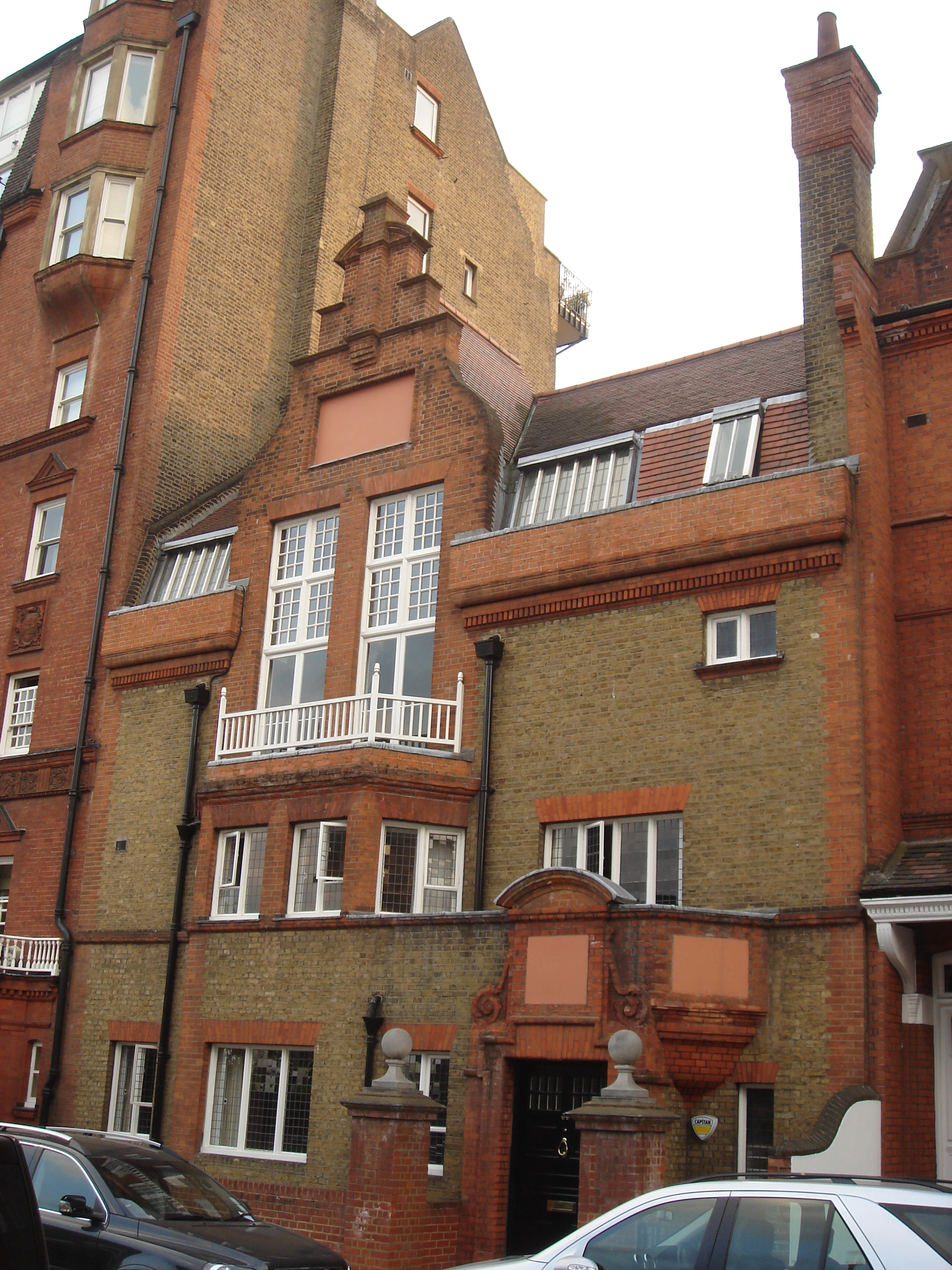
44, Tite Street SW3

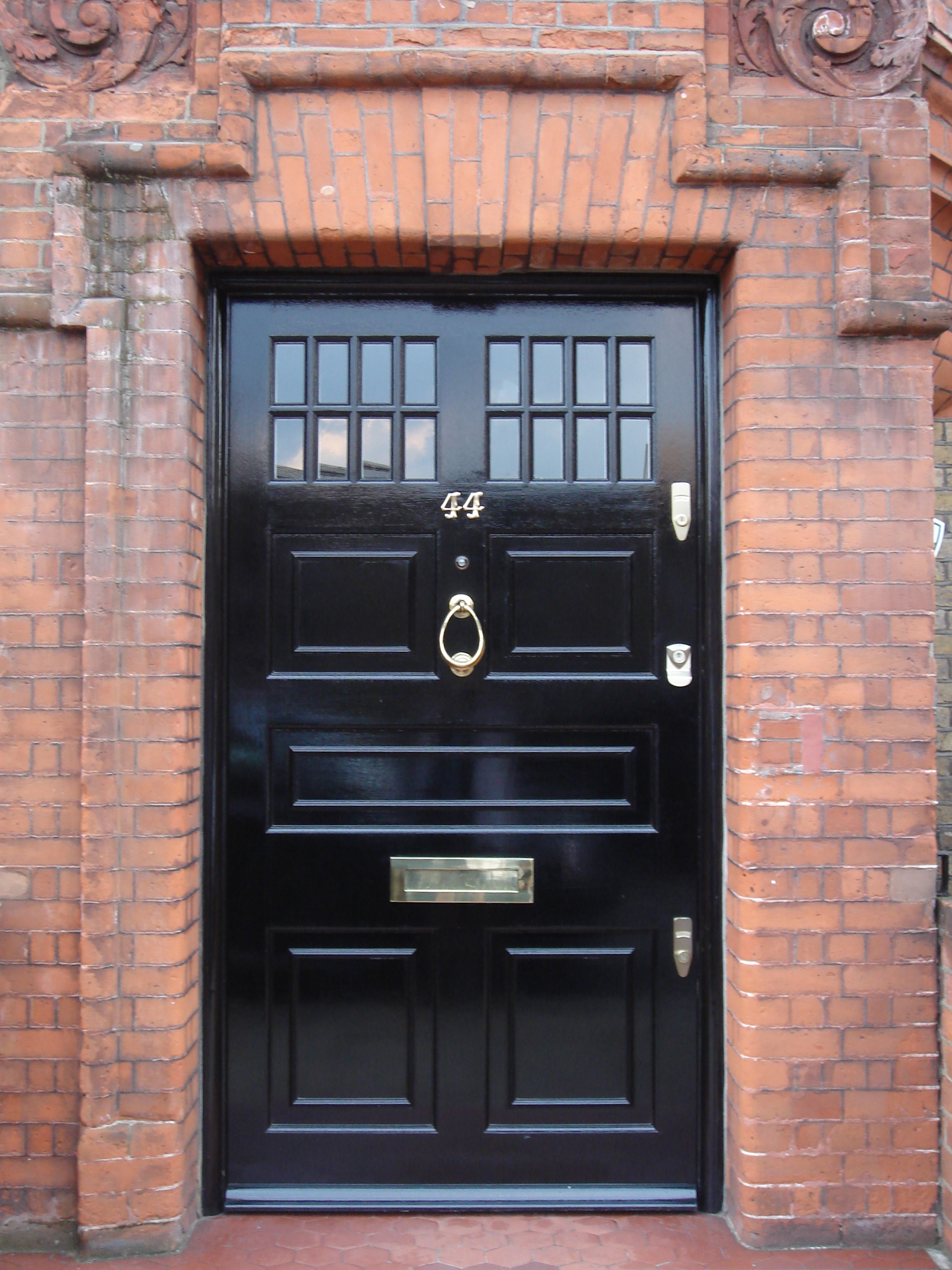
44, Tite Street SW3

Miles commissioned Edward William Godwin to build him a house at what was then No 1 (but later renumbered to 44) Tite Street, Chelsea and moved in from his previous residence off the Strand. Oscar Wilde had been living with him since leaving Oxford in 1878 but it is clear that Miles, two years older than Wilde, was by far the dominant partner. Wilde, although ambitious, had no money and few social connections, while Miles had both. With a generous allowance from his wealthy father and the royalties from his drawings, Miles was able to keep his friend in style. The Court Directory and the Post Office London Directory for 1881 list Miles as the occupant but do not mention Wilde. The 1881 census names Miles as head of the household and describes Wilde as merely a "boarder". The house was on the market in 2011 for £15,500,000.

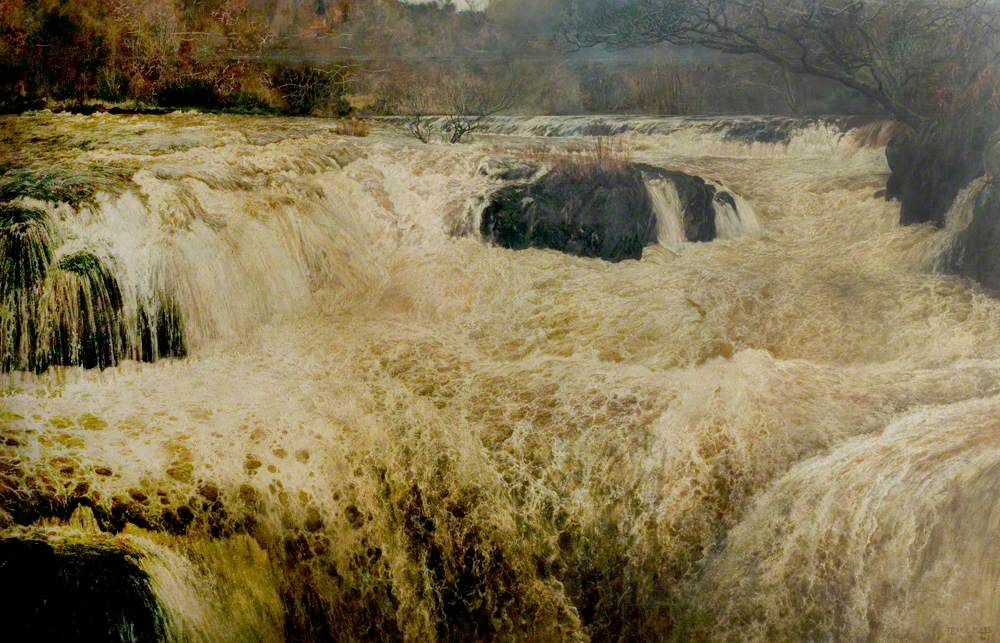
Salmon Leap at Cenarth Falls, by George Francis Miles

His paintings and drawings included Lillie Langtry, Daisy Greville, Countess of Warwick (another mistress to King Edward VII), the Countess of Lonsdale, Sir George Sitwell and his wife Ida and Princess Victoria, Princess Maud and Princess Louise. His work can also be seen in the church at Bingham, Nottinghamshire where he designed the stained-glass windows; at Nottinghamshire County Cricket Club where his 1875 portrait of Richard Daft, the club's captain, is kept and at Nottinghamshire City Museum and Gallery where his 1878 landscape of Cenarth Falls is on display.

He imported many species of plant and cultivated new varieties.

=== Insanity ===
In 1887, Miles was committed to Brislington House, an asylum near Bristol, and he died in 1891 of what was diagnosed as 'general paralysis of the insane' (a term for neurosyphilis; 4 years), exhaustion and pneumonia. After being depleted by paying for his medical care at the asylum, on his death, the remaining possessions of a once-wealthy man with a large inheritance and a successful artistic career were found to be worth only £20 (approx £2,200 in 2025 terms). By comparison, his brother, Rev. Canon Charles Oswald Miles, who administered his estate, left £3,600 13s 6d (£400,000 in 2025 terms) when he died in 1898, and his cousin Sir Cecil Miles, 3rd Baronet, left £171,591 17s 4d (some £19 million in 2025 terms) in the same year. He was buried at Almondsbury, near Bristol.

=== Lillie Langtry ===
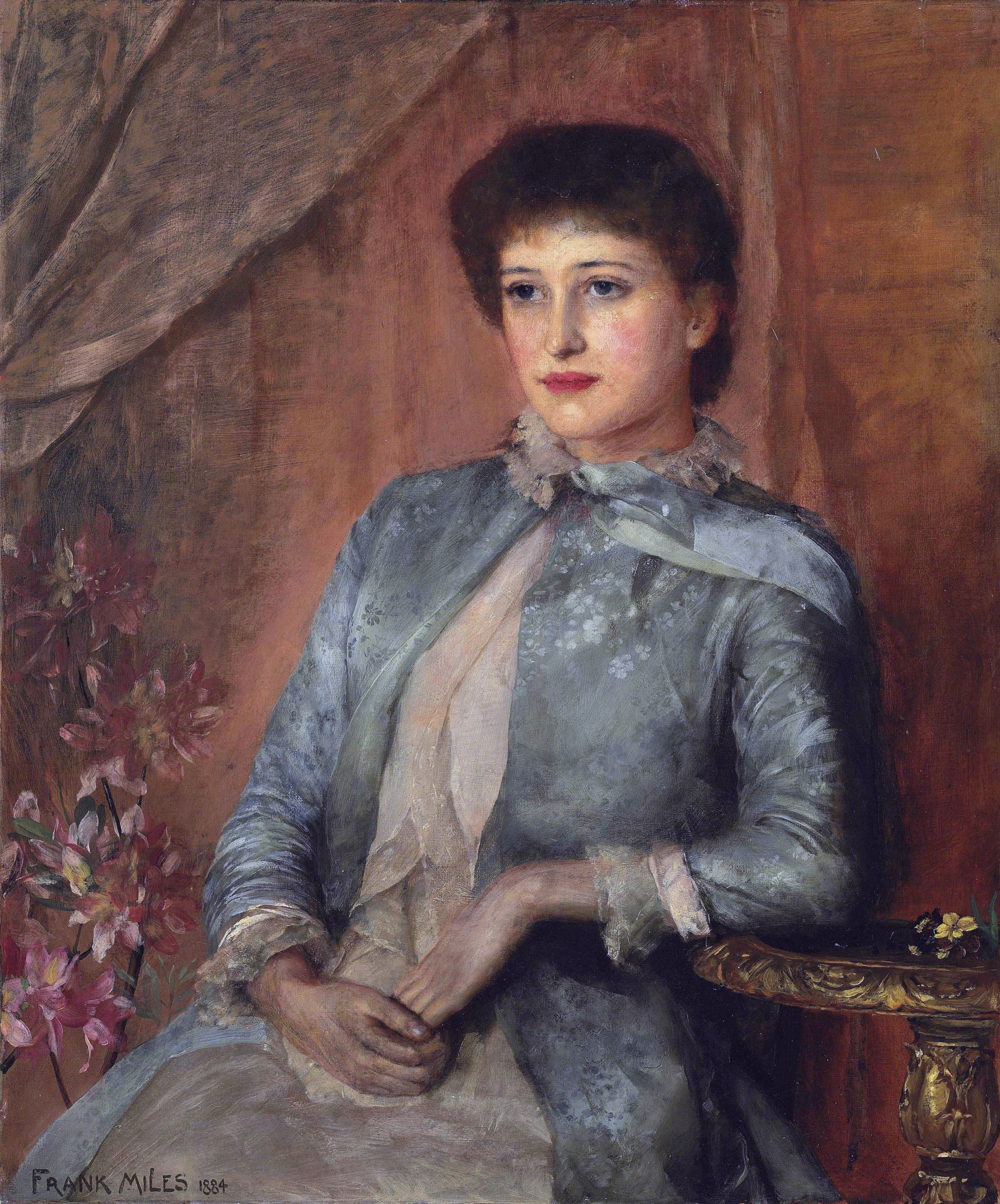
Lillie Langtry (George Frank Miles, 1884)

Frank Miles and his artistic inspiration Lillie Langtry are portrayed in the 1978 televised mini-series Lillie. Langtry became the first publicly acknowledged mistress of the then Prince of Wales, later King Edward VII, between 1877 and 1880. The Prince of Wales was an occasional guest and shooting companion of Frank's cousin, Sir Philip Miles. In an interview published in several newspapers (including the Brisbane Herald) in 1882, Langtry said:

It was through Lord Ranelagh and the painter Frank Miles that I was first introduced to London society… I went to London and was brought out by my friends. Among the most enthusiastic of these was Mr Frank Miles, the artist. I learned afterwards that he saw me one evening at the theatre, and tried in vain to discover who I was. He went to his clubs and among his artist friends declaring he had seen a beauty, and he described me to everybody he knew, until one day one of his friends met me and he was duly introduced. Then Mr Miles came and begged me to sit for my portrait. I consented, and when the portrait was finished he sold it to Prince Leopold. From that time I was invited everywhere and made a great deal of by many members of the royal family and nobility. After Frank Miles I sat for portraits to Millais and Burne-Jones and now Frith is putting my face in one of his great pictures.

== Jack the Ripper suspect ==
It has been theorised that Miles was a suspect in the Jack the Ripper murders. At the time of the murders he was at the asylum at Brislington, over 120 miles (190 km) away from Whitechapel. He does not match the physical descriptions of suspects, particularly as to his height. Most descriptions of Jack the Ripper have him between 5 feet 5 inches and 5 feet 7 inches, and most frequently described as "stout" whereas Miles was tall, of athletic build and keen on sport, particularly tennis.
