= Davis Croghan =

Davis George Croghan, D.D. (July 10, 1832 in Ireland – November 21, 1890 in South Africa), the first Archdeacon of Bloemfontein, and Provost of the Cathedral.

Dr. Croghan was a graduate of Trinity College, Dublin. He arrived in Bloemfontein on 28 February 1867, but left on 6 March 1887, in part because of the relatively harsh winters in the Orange Free State, and became Dean of Grahamstown.
