= Abercych =

Village in Pembrokeshire, Wales

Coordinates: 52.038°N 4.555°W

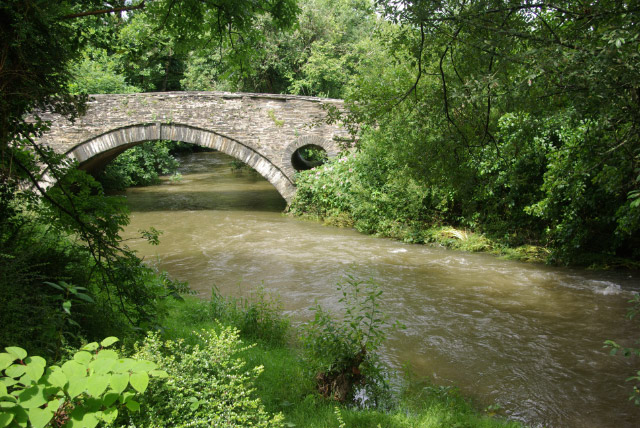
- Pont Treseli carrying the B4332 over Afon Cych

- Location within Pembrokeshire
- OS grid reference: SN248409
- Principal area: Pembrokeshire
- Country: Wales
- Sovereign state: United Kingdom
- Post town: Boncath
- Postcode district: SA37
- Dialling code: 01239
- Police: Dyfed-Powys
- Fire: Mid and West Wales
- Ambulance: Welsh
- UK Parliament: Preseli Pembrokeshire
- Senedd Cymru – Welsh Parliament: Preseli Pembrokeshire

Abercych (or Abercuch, Welsh pronunciation: [ɑbərkiːx]) is a small village in the community of Manordeifi, northeast Pembrokeshire in South West Wales, located approximately 1/3 mile (0.54 km) from the tripoint of the counties of Pembrokeshire, Carmarthenshire and Ceredigion. The village developed from a number of small settlements along the west bank of Afon Cych, which flows into the River Teifi nearby, giving the village its name, meaning "mouth of the Cych".

The village has two pubs, one of which brews its own beer, two chapels and a care farm.

== Description ==
Abercych is a village in the parish and community of Manordeifi, Pembrokeshire, of fewer than 100 houses scattered mostly along the sides of a small lane that runs along the western slopes of the Cych valley. It is 5.5 miles (8.9 km) from the nearest town, Newcastle Emlyn.

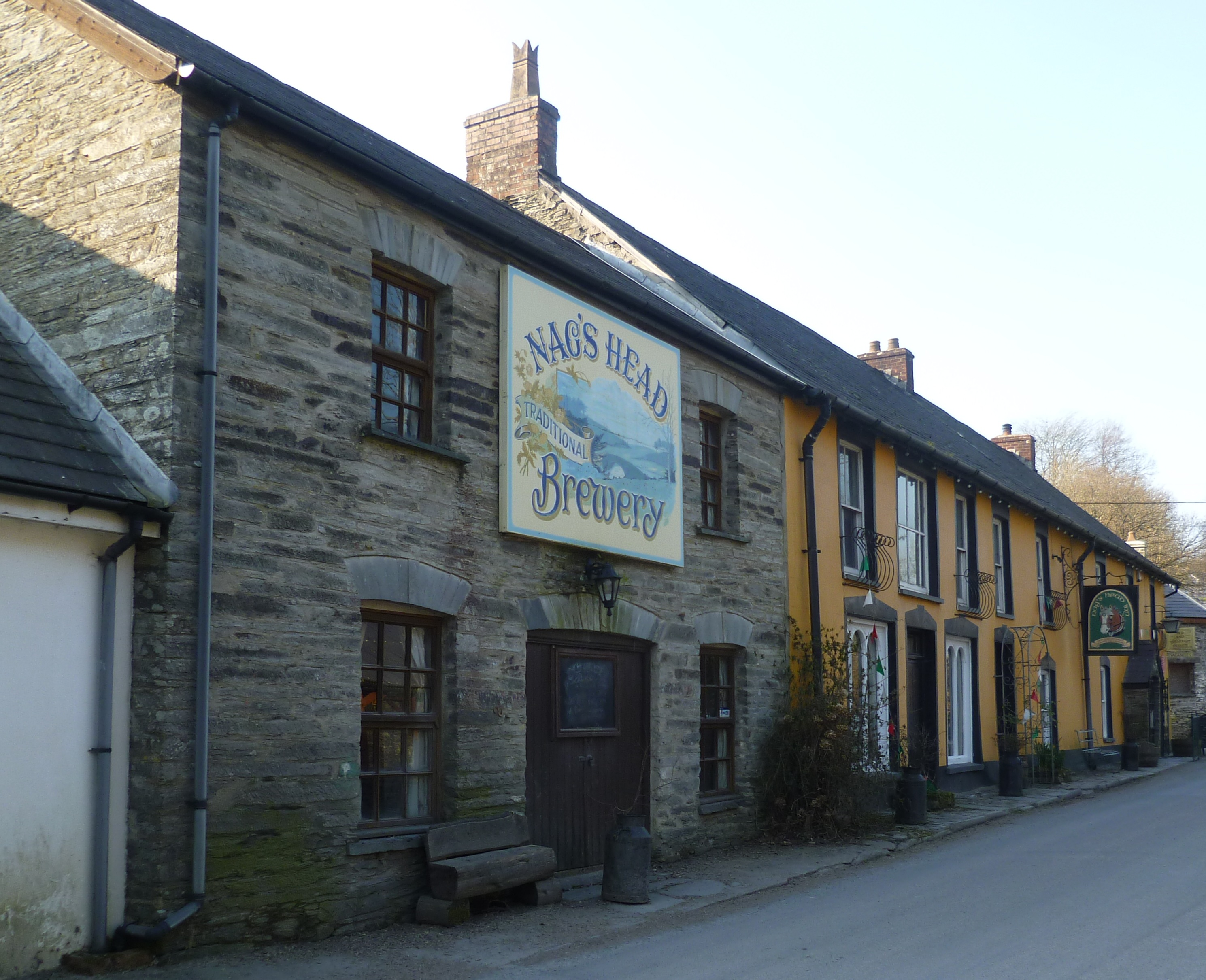
The Nags Head pub and microbrewery

The village is rural with no industry except for a timber sawmill at the western end of the village. It has a village hall which hosts the Manordeifi Community Council meetings every other month, and two public houses: The Penrhiw Inn and The Nag's Head; the latter used to have its own microbrewery.

There is a number of small 'cottage industries' in the village including the magazine Sacred Hoop.

An annual dance festival has been held in the village since 2013.

=== Clynfyw ===
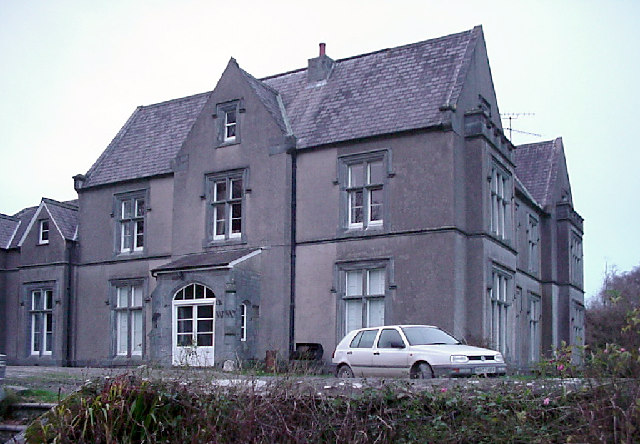
Clynfyw in 2005

Clynfyw (also recorded as Clynfiew) is a 16th-century mansion rebuilt in the 18th century, It was owned by David Lloyd of Clement's Inn, London, who sold it to David Llewelin of Penalltcych, Clydey, in 1685. Llewelin's grandson, Owen Davies of Westminster, sold the estate in 1753 to Thomas Lewis of Llwyngrawys, Llangoedmor, Cardiganshire. The large Clynfiew collection of estate records from 1542 to 1916 is lodged at the National Library of Wales. Since the mid-1980s Clynvyw has been a Community interest company care farm registered with Care Inspectorate Wales. The farm has eight live-in staff and up to 40 day-students working on practical projects. In 2020, the manager, Jim Bowen, whose family have run the farm since the 18th century, accepted a Queen's Award for Enterprise from the Prince of Wales, its second such award.

== History ==
Abercych is an ancient settlement, the Welsh placename of which means 'the mouth of the Afon Cych', referring to where the Cych joins the River Teifi. The earliest recorded settlement was a forge, now no longer in existence. The linear nature of the present village arose from the joining up of several discrete settlements: Pont Hercws, Forge Cych, Penrhiw, Pont Treseli and Abercych itself. There were about 30 houses in the 1840s.

== Worship ==
The village has two chapels: Ramoth Baptist Chapel (built 1827), and Bryn Sion Independent Chapel (built 1831).

== Folklore ==
The Cych is a small river, which is connected with the realm of Annwn in the ancient Welsh tale of Pwyll Pendefig Dyfed, the first of the Four Branches of the Mabinogi. There are several places on the upper reaches of the Cych that are seen as an entry point to the 'other worlds' (fairy realms), and there are some folk tales told by some local people about the magical nature of river and the valley.
