= Afon Cych =

River in Wales

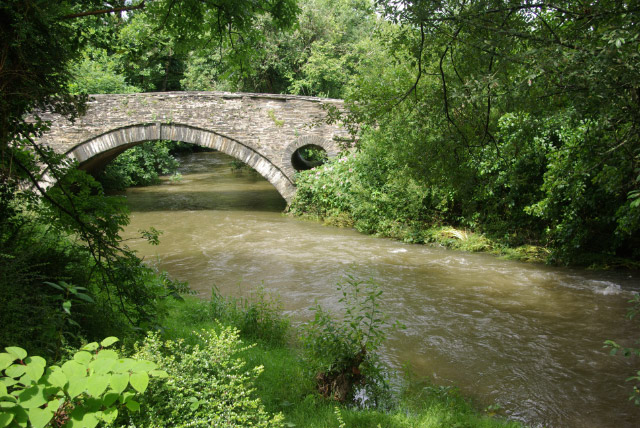

- Mouth
- Native name: Afon Cuch (Welsh)

Location
- Location: Pembrokeshire, Carmarthenshire

Physical characteristics
- Mouth
  - location: River Teifi
- Length: 13 km (8.1 mi)

Basin features
- River system: River Teifi

Afon Cych (standard Welsh orthography: Afon Cuch) is a tributary of the River Teifi in south-west Wales. It is 13 km long, passes through a number of small settlements on the border between Pembrokeshire and Carmarthenshire, and is significant in Welsh legend.

== Sources ==
Its "official" source (although not its highest headwater) is at Blaencych 51°57′53″N 4°29′28″W.

== Course ==
The river flows north-westwards through a deep, wooded, secluded valley, and joins the River Teifi at Abercych 52°2′36″N 4°33′34″W. Its total length is 13 kilometres (8.1 mi). It receives numerous small tributaries: the Sylgen, Barddi, Mamog, Dwrog and Lŵyd on the east side, and the Pedran, Cneifa and Dulas on the west side. It formed the ancient boundary between the commotes of Emlyn Is Cuch and Emlyn Uwch Cuch, and it today forms part of the boundary between Pembrokeshire and Carmarthenshire.

The river runs through the small settlements of Cwmorgan and Cwmcych, and the village of Abercych.

== Bridges ==
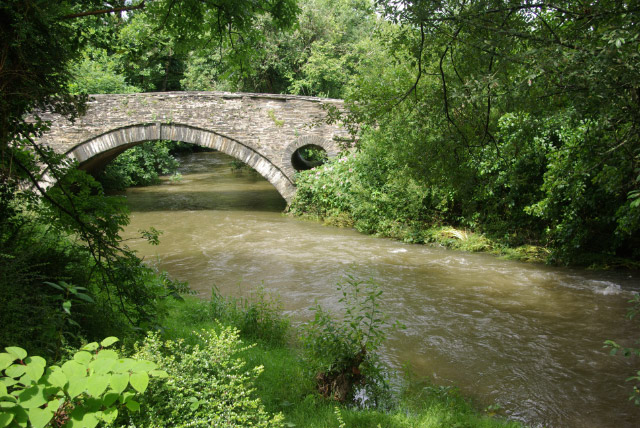
Pont Treseli, Abercych

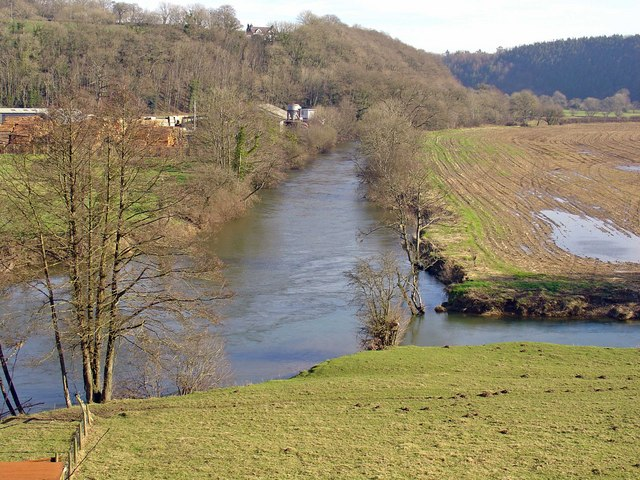
Confluence of the Cych (right) and Teifi

The Cych is crossed by a number of bridges including (from upstream) Pont Cwmorgan, Pont Wedwst, Pont Newydd, Pont Cych at Cwmcych (built in 1737 and Grade II listed), an unnamed bridge by Bridgend, Pont Glancych and Grade II listed Pont Treseli which carries the B4332 road at Abercych and has perforated spandrels similar to Cenarth Bridge.

== History and legend ==
The river's name is marked (in Latin, as Keach flu.) on a 1583 map of Pembrokeshire.

The valley (Glyn Cuch) is well known in Welsh literature as the place where, in the Mabinogi, Pwyll Pendefig Dyfed has his fateful meeting with Arawn, Lord of the Underworld. Boundary streams were often thought of as portals to the underworld.
