= Mynachlog-ddu =

Village, parish and community in Pembrokeshire, Wales

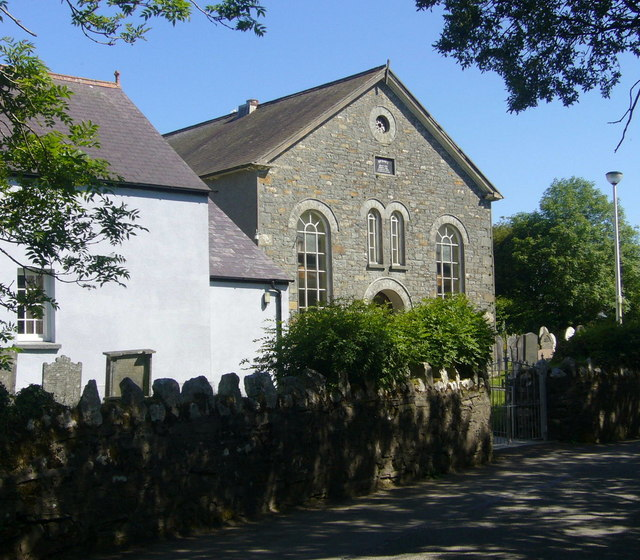
- Bethel Chapel, Mynachlog-ddu

- Location within Pembrokeshire
- Population: 494 (2011)
- OS grid reference: SN 14 30
  - Cardiff: 72.8 mi (117.2 km)
  - London: 198.2 mi (319.0 km)
- Community: Mynachlogddu
- Principal area: Pembrokeshire
- Country: Wales
- Sovereign state: United Kingdom
- Post town: Clunderwen
- Postcode district: SA66
- Police: Dyfed-Powys
- Fire: Mid and West Wales
- Ambulance: Welsh
- UK Parliament: Preseli Pembrokeshire
- Senedd Cymru – Welsh Parliament: Ceredigion Penfro
- List of places UK Wales Pembrokeshire 51.9423°N 4.7015°W Map of the community

Mynachlog-ddu (SN143306) is a village, parish and community in the Preseli Hills, Pembrokeshire, Wales. The community includes the parish of Llangolman. In 2011 the community had a population of 494.

== Origin of the name ==
The Welsh placename means "black monastic grange": before the Dissolution of the Monasteries, the parish belonged to St Dogmaels Abbey.

== Geography ==
Mynachlog-ddu sits on a plateau 200 metres (660 ft) above sea level between Carn Menyn (365 metres, 1,198 ft) and Foel Dyrch (368 metres, 1,207 ft) in the Preseli Hills.

== History ==
Mynachlog-ddu and the surrounding Preselis are rich in prehistoric remains. It is one of the possible sites of the Battle of Mynydd Carn in 1081. By c.1100 it was under the control of the Normans. Much has been unenclosed moorland since the Middle Ages, with few houses. The village developed as housing for slate quarry workers and there has been a chapel in the village since 1794.

The population of the parish in 1821 was 447.

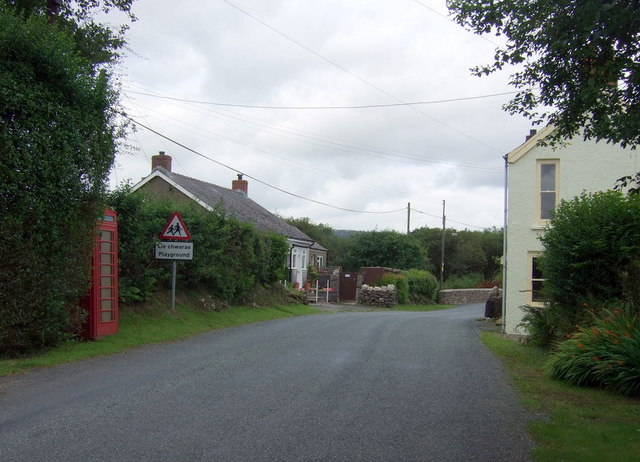
Mynachlog-ddu

Carn Menyn is presumed to be the source of the bluestones used in the inner circle of Stonehenge. In 2000/2001 a project was established to try to transport a piece of bluestone from the village to Stonehenge. The project ended when the stone sank in the sea. It was lifted out a few months after, but the project was never resumed. A comedy based on the idea of a campaign to have the bluestones returned Bringing Back the Bluestones premiered in Pembrokeshire.

There are six listed structures in the community.

== Worship ==
There are two places of worship in the village: the Anglican church (Church in Wales) of St Dogfael (sometimes, Dogmael), and Bethel, the Baptist meeting house.

== Notable people ==
- The poet Waldo Williams (1904–1971) was a pupil at the primary school (where his father was headteacher) between 1911 and 1915, where he learned to speak Welsh. There is a memorial to him at nearby Rhos Fach.
- Dutch naval officer and Colditz prisoner of war camp escapee Damiaen Joan van Doorninck (1902–1987) spent his retirement in Mynachlogddu and died there.
- TV and radio presenter, Mari Grug, grew up on a farm in the village.
