= Carn Menyn =

Rock outcrops in Wales

Carn Menyn or Carn Meini
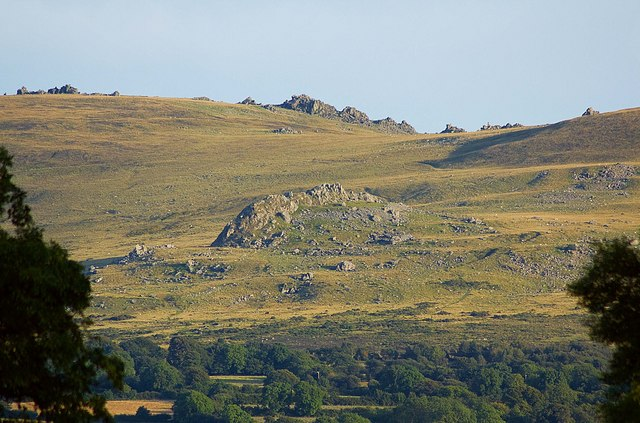
- Carn Menyn on the skyline, viewed from the north

Highest point
- Elevation: 365 m (1,198 ft)
- Prominence: 48 m (157 ft)
- Parent peak: Foel Cwmcerwyn
- Coordinates: 51°57′34″N 4°42′09″W

Naming
- English translation: Butter Rock
- Language of name: Welsh

Geography
- Location: Pembrokeshire, United Kingdom
- Parent range: Preseli Hills
- OS grid: SN144324
- Topo map: OS Outdoor Leisure 35

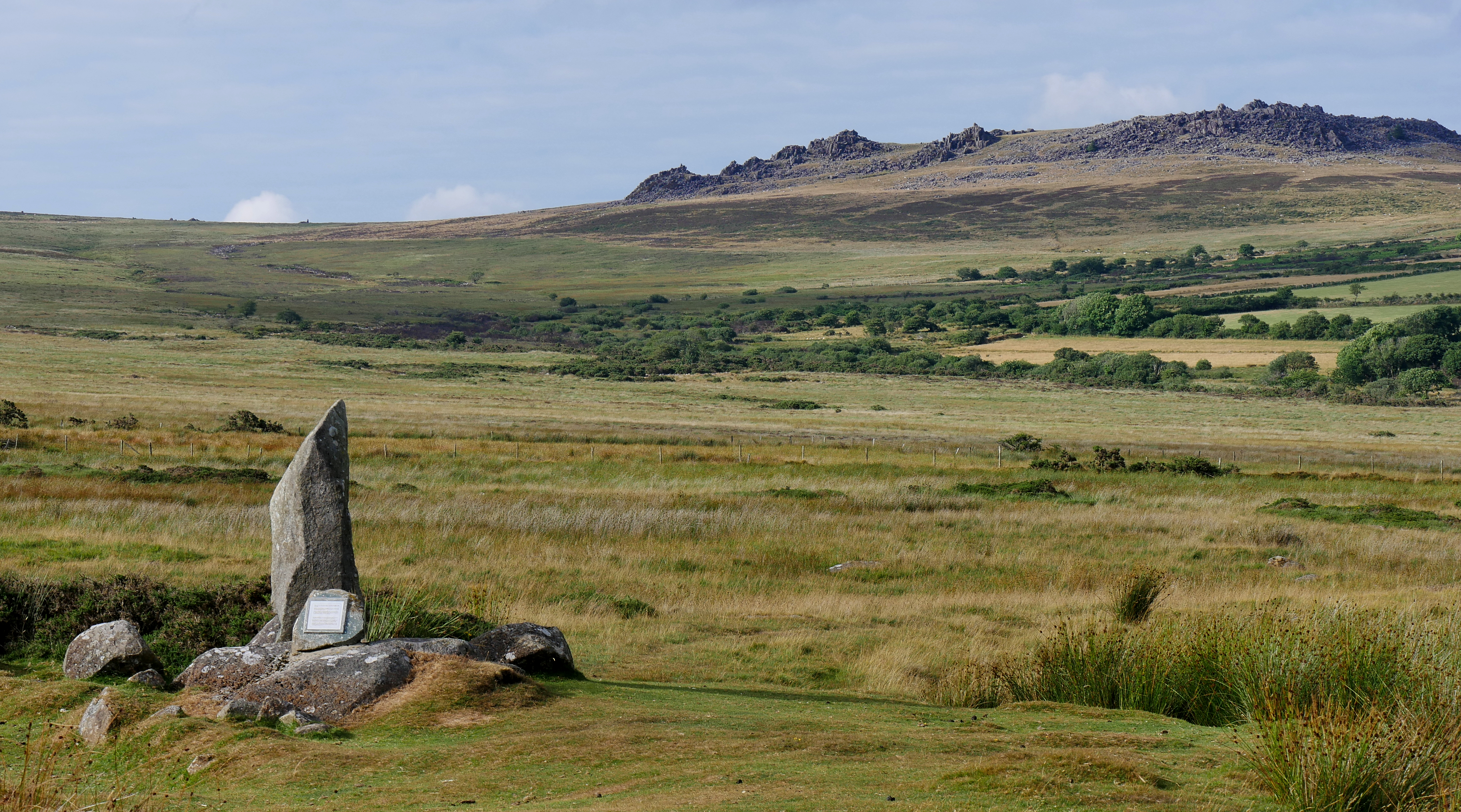
Carn Menyn viewed from the south. Carnmenyn monument in the foreground

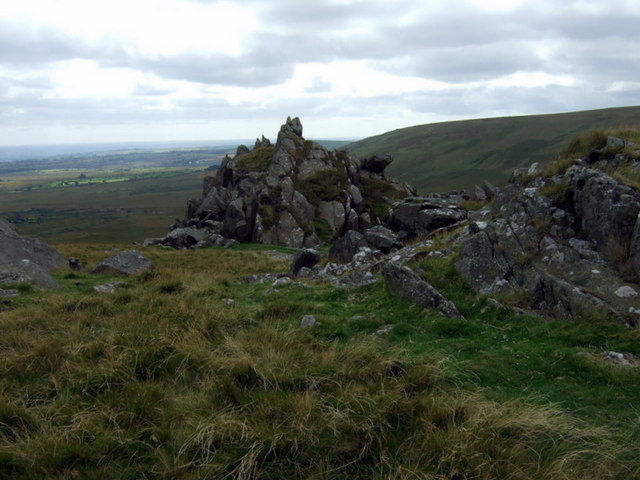
Summit of Carn Menyn

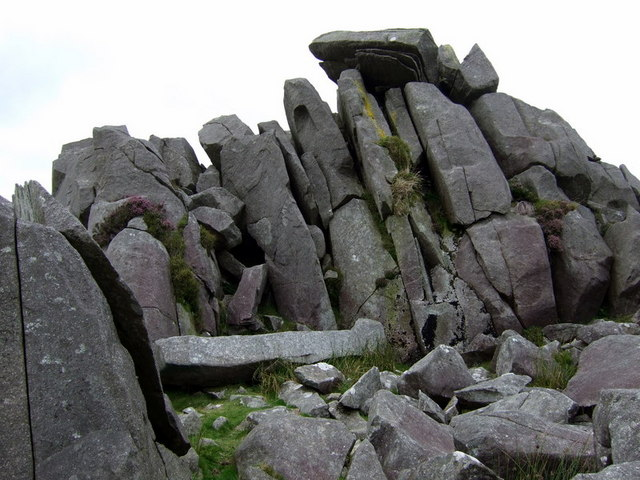
Bluestones on Carn Menyn

Carn Menyn is a grouping of craggy rock outcrops or tors in the Preseli Hills in the Welsh county of Pembrokeshire.

== Name and location ==
The name means "butter rock". It is sometimes called Carn Meini ("rock of stones"), but this is a modern corruption of the original name.

Carn Menyn sits on top of the Preseli ridge, close to the stone setting of Bedd Arthur. It consists of a series of outcrops of spotted dolerite similar to that of other tors in the area, and several other prehistoric sites have been identified nearby. The mountain-top setting provides commanding views across the surrounding countryside and across Cardigan Bay to the Llŷn Peninsula.

== Bluestones ==
Carn Menyn is believed by some to have been the main source for the bluestones used at Stonehenge. Sir Andrew Ramsey first suggested it as a contender in the mid-nineteenth century. In the early 1920s HH Thomas showed through petrographic analysis that many of the bluestones had come from the Preseli Hills, and in 2005 work led by Timothy Darvill and Geoff Wainwright supported the idea that Carn Menyn was the primary quarry. This is disputed by others, and Williams-Thorpe and others from the Open University have suggested that the Stonehenge bluestones came from at least twenty different places, with the Carn Goedog dyke about one mile to the west as the most likely source for the spotted dolerites.

Survey work between 2002 and 2004 by the Strumble-Preseli Ancient Communities and Environment Study (SPACES) recorded an enclosure on the upper part of the outcrop consisting of a steep-sided promontory with a bank of stones across its neck. Although only around 3,500 square metres in area the enclosure contains several dolerite outcrops, each naturally fractured into shapes that could be formed into columns. Semi-worked megaliths lay scattered around apparently having been simply levered out from the larger outcrops. It is debatable whether these "semi-worked megaliths" are prehistoric or recent, since this area has been used by the farming community for at least 300 years for the collection of stone gateposts, lintels and building slabs.

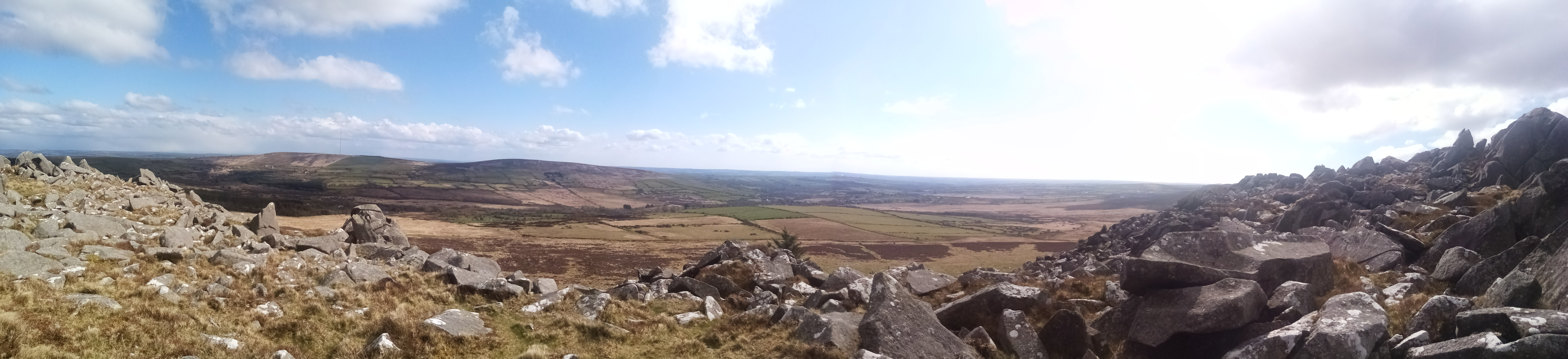
A view from Carn Menyn

Geochemical analysis has shown that some of the bluestones from the inner horseshoe at Stonehenge probably came from Carn Menyn, Carn Goedog, Carn Breseb, Cerrig Marchogion and other sites in the Preseli Hills, while rhyolite fragments may have come from Carn Alw and further afield.

Evidence for later exploitation of the stone at Carn Menyn has been found despite the site's remoteness. Two nearby chapels and many houses in the area were built from Carn Menyn stone. However, this stone was not used preferentially in megalithic or ritual structures—stone from all of the outcrops or tors on Mynydd Preseli has been used in buildings and field boundaries, so long as access by horse-drawn sleds and carts was possible.

In April 2005 an excavation at the site clarified the extent of the enclosure but did not retrieve any cultural material. The same year, the then Archdruid of the Welsh Gorsedd of Bards, Robyn Lewis, wrote to the Daily Telegraph proposing that the Bluestones be returned from Stonehenge to the Preseli Hills. This was also the subject of a stage play called Bringing Back the Bluestones.

Geological studies by Bevins, Ixer and Pearce in 2013 and 2014 have confirmed the suggestion of the Open University team that the spotted dolerites at Stonehenge have come from Carn Goedog and not Carn Menyn.

== See also ==
- Theories about Stonehenge

== Sources ==
- Darvill, T and Wainwright, G, Exploring Preseli in British Archaeology 83, July–August 2005, p29.
- Williams-Thorpe, Olwen et al, Oxford Journal of Archaeology, 25(1). pp 29–46 (2006)
