= Henllan Amgoed =

Village in Carmarthenshire, Wales

Coordinates: 51.844520°N 4.636250°W

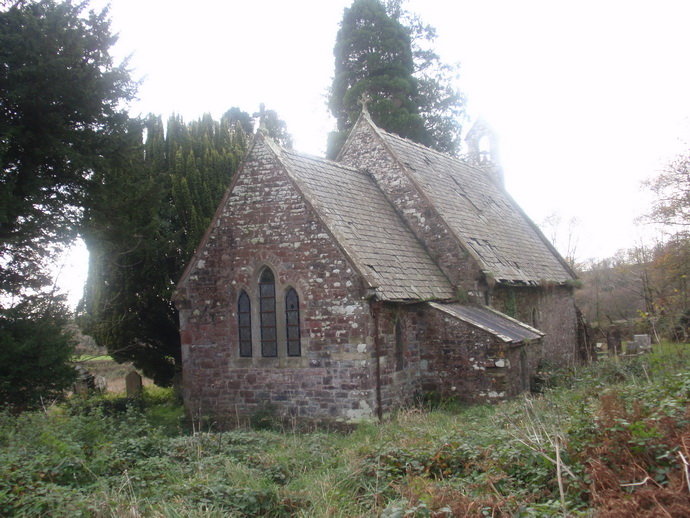
- The chapel at Henllan Amgoed

- Location within Carmarthenshire
- OS grid reference: SN185195
- Community: Henllanfallteg
- Principal area: Carmarthenshire
- Preserved county: Carmarthenshire
- Country: Wales
- Sovereign state: United Kingdom
- Post town: WHITLAND
- Postcode district: SA34
- Dialling code: 01994
- Police: Dyfed-Powys
- Fire: Mid and West Wales
- Ambulance: Welsh
- UK Parliament: Caerfyrddin
- Senedd Cymru – Welsh Parliament: Carmarthen East and Dinefwr

Henllan Amgoed is a small village near Whitland, Carmarthenshire and forms part of the community of Henllanfallteg. The village is home to a chapel and a graveyard. Henllan Amgoed was served by a small local primary school until its closure in 2004, with the pupils moved to an amalgamated school, Ysgol Bro Brynach, in Llanboidy.

Henllan Amgoed takes its name from the ancient commote of Amgoed, and is the only village to retain the name of the past division. In 1697 a Nonconformist congregation formed in the village, one of the earliest in Carmarthenshire.

== Notable residents ==
Eileen Beasley (1921–2012), a prominent Welsh language activist was born and died in the village.

== Bibliography ==
- Davies, John; Jenkins, Nigel; Menna, Baines; Lynch, Peredur I., eds. (2008). The Welsh Academy Encyclopaedia of Wales. Cardiff: University of Wales Press. ISBN 978-0-7083-1953-6.
