= Celtic Way =

Footpath in England and Wales

- Length: 725 miles (1,167 km).
- Location: England, Wales
- Trailheads: Strumble Head, Pembrokeshire (grid reference SM895412) - St Michael's Mount, Cornwall (grid reference SW514299)
- Use: Hiking
- Elevation change: 83,500 ft (25,500 m)
- Highest point: 2,580 ft (790 m)
- Difficulty: Challenging

The Celtic Way is a long-distance walk from West Wales, through South Wales and into Wessex and the West of England in the United Kingdom. The route is 725-mile-long (1,167 km) and visits more than one hundred pre-historic sites through its route.

== The route ==
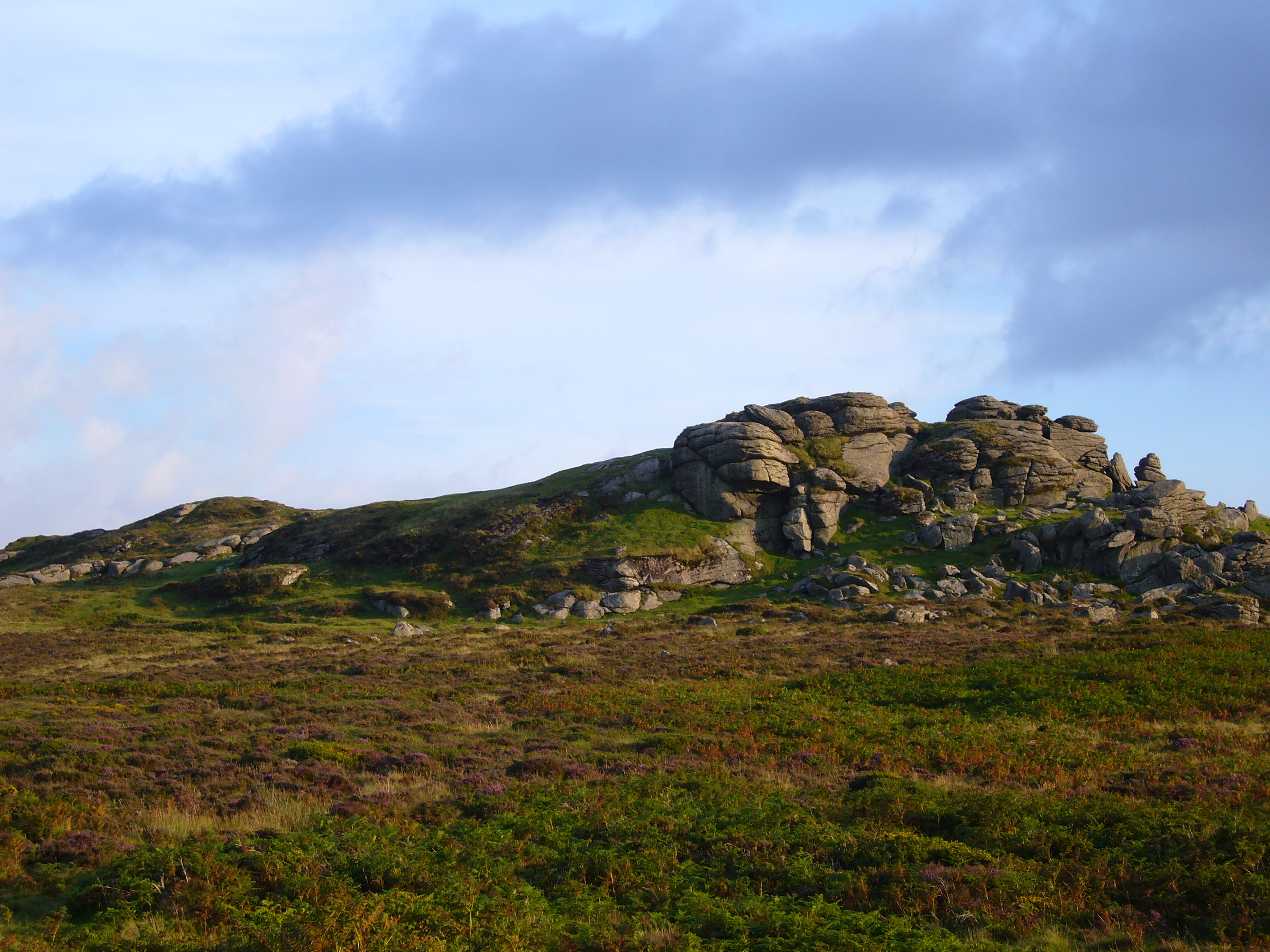
A typical Dartmoor tor close to Haytor

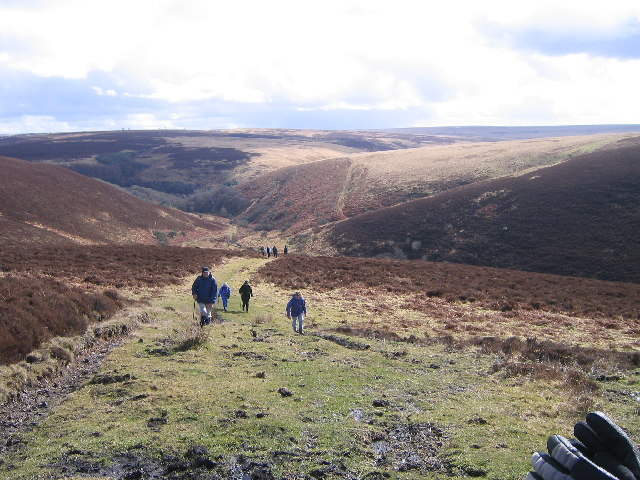
Typical moorland scenery on Exmoor

The route runs from Pembrokeshire eastward through South Wales to Chepstow where it enters the county of Gloucestershire and carries on through Wiltshire to its destination at Stonehenge. There is the option of continuing to Somerset and Dorset Devon and Cornwall. A guide to the route was published in 1998: The Celtic Way: A long distance walk through western Britain by Val Saunders Evans, Cheshire: Sigma Leisure.

The route links sites of importance in Celtic Britain and prehistory. Its central focus is Stonehenge. Key sites along the route include the following: in Pembrokeshire: Ynys Meicel, Goodwick SSI footpath, Tre-llan holy well, Carn Ingli, Pentre Ifan, Gors Fawr stone circle; in Carmarthenshire: Gwal y Filiast burial chamber, Castell Mawr, Merlin's Hill, Llanegwad, Dryslwyn Castle, Gron Gaer Hillfort, Dinefawr Castle, Carn Goch Hillfort; the Black Mountain from the Carmarthenshire and Powys border going into Glamorgan: the Carmarthenshire 'Fans' - Fan Brycheiniog ridge, Fan Hir, the Myddfai lakes, Llyn y Fan Fach and Fawr associated with the physicians of Myddfai, Cerrig Duon stone circle, waterfalls at Scwd yr Eira and Sgwd Gwladys, and the heights of Sarn Helen.

The route continues through the Vale of Glamorgan, including two significant burial chambers: Tinkinswood and St Lythans, both of which raise interesting archaeoastronomical questions. High level walking above the post-industrial coastal plain runs eastward over the Garth Mountain, Caerphilly Mountain, Twmbarlwm, and over Gray Hill to Wentwood before coming down to the Bristol Channel where the route crosses the Severn Bridge walkway then links with established footpaths in England to the Wiltshire Avon on its way to Windmill Hill, Avebury, Silbury Hill, West Kennet Long Barrow and through this designated Heritage Landscape to Stonehenge. From here it is possible to walk across the Hillforts of Wessex to Glastonbury.

There is a continuation from Somerset down to Penwith in Cornwall, and St Michael's Mount, following routes across Exmoor National Park, the Celtic Way Exmoor Option and over Dartmoor.

The final section runs from Stonehenge to the Dorset Coast to set the scene for a walking route linking with France at Mont St Michel. In 2013 the route was being revised and updated.
