= Penbanc =

- tŷ hir
- Interactive map of the Penbanc area

General information
- Type: Longhouse
- Location: Wales
- Coordinates: 51.9869499°N 4.7448654°W

Technical details
- Floor count: 1

Penbanc is a 19th-century thatched Pembrokeshire longhouse (tŷ hir in Welsh) about 1.5 kilometres (0.9 miles) northwest of the hamlet of Brynberian in the Preseli Hills area of the Pembrokeshire Coast National Park in Pembrokeshire, West Wales. It is designated by Cadw as a Grade II listed building.

== Construction ==
The cottage is a single storey building of rubble stone walls with larger quoin stones. The walls are colourwashed and the roof is thatched. The thatch was covered with a corrugated tin roof until the cottage was restored in 2013 and the roof re-thatched. The interior has rough A-frame trusses formed from rounded timbers with pegged joints. Rough purlins support the roof thatch. The A-frames and purlins are now exposed but originally there would have been a boarded loft. According to Cadw, originally the thatch straw was probably laid over an underthatch of gorse over a layer of straw rope. When re-thatched, a base coat of slates was tied on with handmade straw rope then laid over with a thatch of combed wheat and drum thrashed landrace long straw.

== History ==
Penbanc is thought to have been built in the mid 19th century as a workers' dwelling. Later that century, a cowshed was added to the side and the internal structure was altered. Under private ownership, the property is now used as a holiday cottage. The cowshed has been incorporated into the accommodation.
