= Cilymaenllwyd =

Community in Carmarthenshire, Wales

Coordinates: 51.899°N 4.680°W

- Community
- Location within Carmarthenshire
- Principal area: Carmarthenshire
- Country: Wales
- Sovereign state: United Kingdom
- Police: Dyfed-Powys
- Fire: Mid and West Wales
- Ambulance: Welsh
- List of places UK Wales Carmarthenshire Map of the community

Cilymaenllwyd is a community on the extreme northwest of Carmarthenshire in Wales. The community population at the 2011 census was 742. It lies about 25 miles (40 km) west of Carmarthen, 12 miles (19 km) southeast of Fishguard and 15 miles (24 km) northeast of Haverfordwest. The A478 road runs through the community.

== Location and demographics ==
Cilymaenllwyd has an area of 2,628 hectares and had a population of 725 in 2003. The western edge of the community borders Pembrokeshire. The community is bordered by the communities of Llanboidy and Henllanfallteg in Carmarthenshire, and by Clynderwen, Mynachlog-ddu and Crymych in Pembrokeshire. The River Tâf forms the eastern boundary. The area is part of the foothills of the Preseli Mountains rising to an altitude of 248 metres and is dissected by deep valleys of the Tâf and its tributaries.

Historically it was part of Derllys Hundred. In the 20th century the main road through the community, which links Cardigan, Ceredigion in the north to Tenby, Pembrokeshire in the south, was designated the A478.

The principal commerce of the parish is agriculture.

== Settlements ==
Few maps mark the name Cilymaenllwyd but there are several settlements in the community.

=== Glandy Cross ===
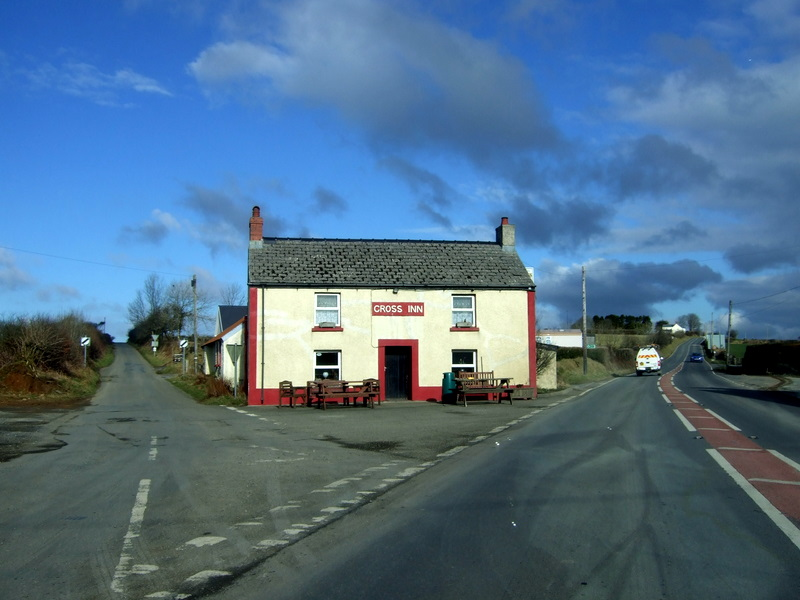
Cross Inn, Glandy Cross

Grid reference SN143266

Glandy Cross is so-named because it lies at the junction of several byways. The main road through the settlement is the A478 and lanes lead to Mynachlog-ddu, Maenclochog, Llangolman and Llanglydwen. The hamlet has a public house (the Cross Inn), a petrol station incorporating a supermarket, a vehicle repair business and a number of domestic dwellings. Crymych Cricket Club's ground is next to the Cross Inn.

=== Efailwen ===
Grid reference SN134253

The history of the hamlet of Efailwen is associated with the Rebecca Riots. On 13 May 1839, the tollgate at Efailwen was the first to be attacked in what would later become known as the Rebecca Riots, an uprising by poor farmers to abolish what they believed was unfair taxation.

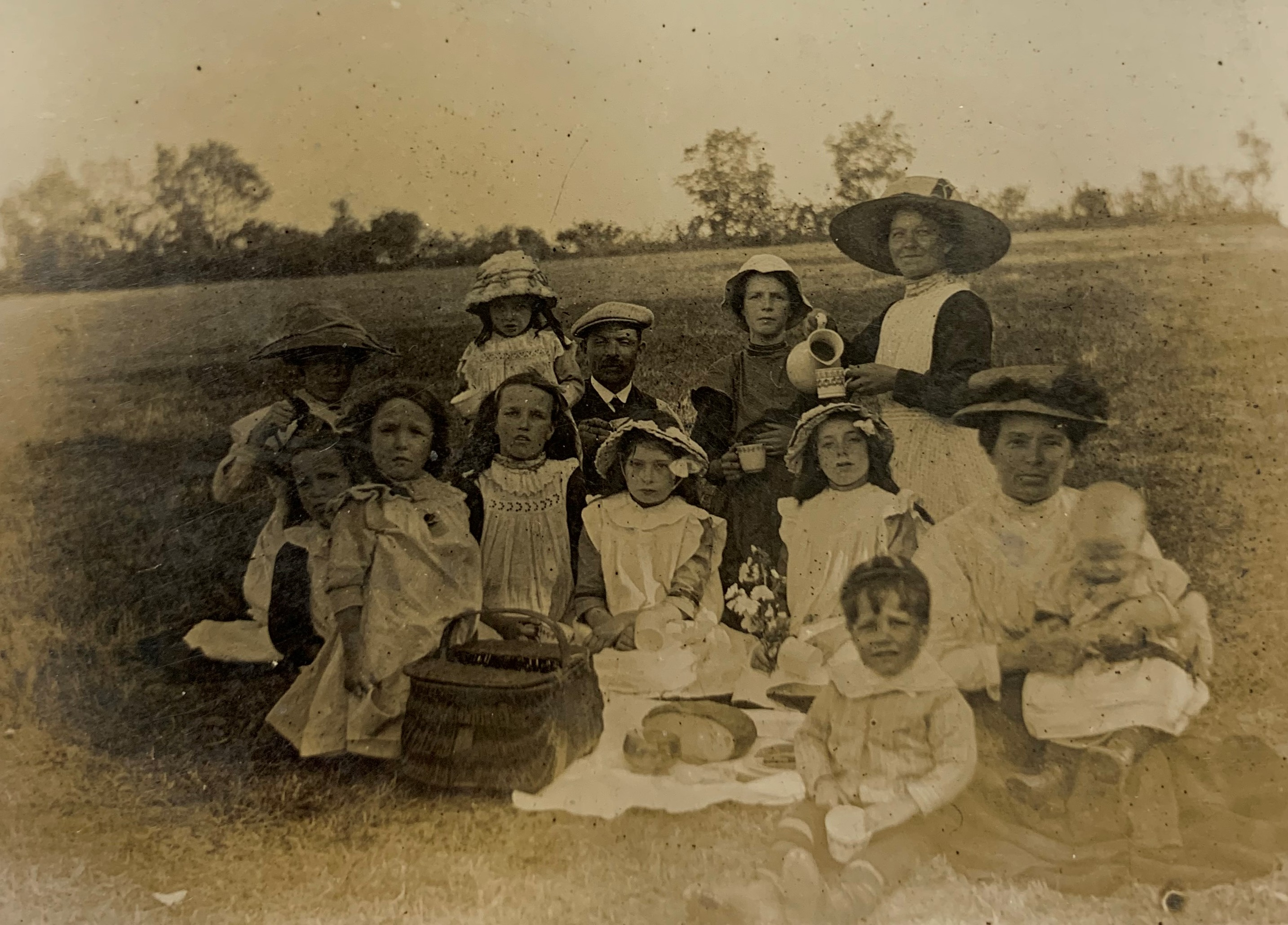
Picnic at Efailwen

Efailwen has a school (Ysgol Beca) serving surrounding settlements, a roadside eatery and a number of domestic dwellings.

=== Hebron ===
Grid reference SN181277

Hebron is a hamlet 1 km north of the village of Llanglydwen. There is a Welsh Independent Chapel here, built in 1804-05 and rebuilt in 1879.

=== Login ===
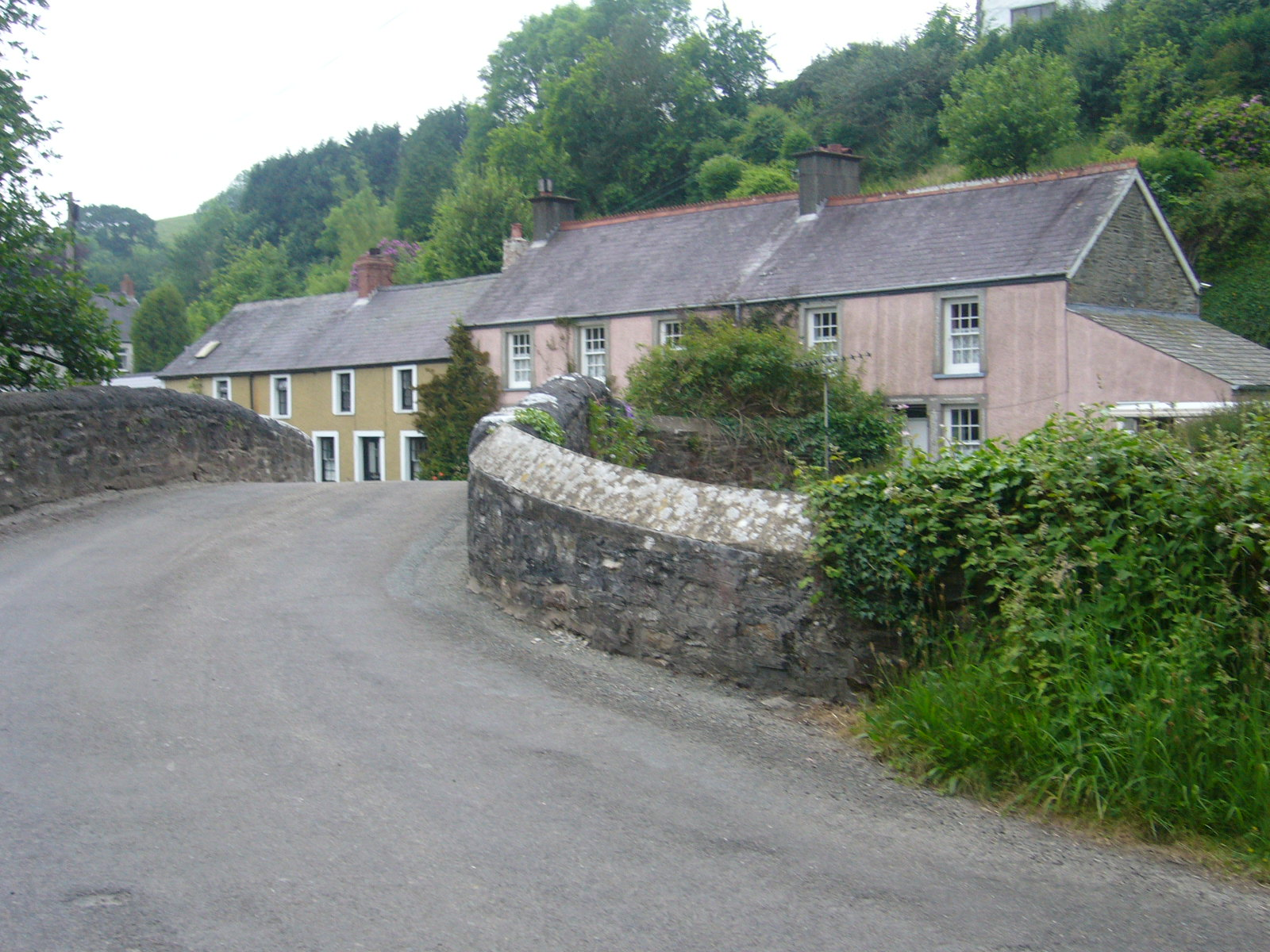
The hamlet of Login: River Taf bridge

Grid reference SN166234

The hamlet of Login lies in the valley and sits on both sides of the River Taf. The name Login may have come from the Old Welsh language word halogyn meaning a dirty pool or stream. The Whitland & Cardigan Railway came up the valley and there was a station in Login.

=== Pant-y Caws ===
Grid reference SN149262

== Worship ==
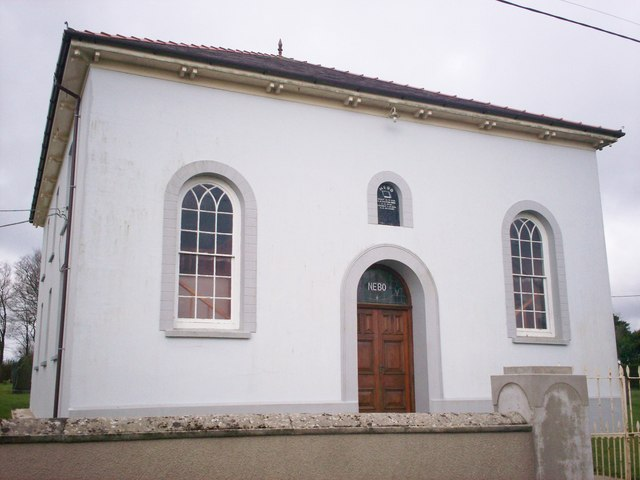
Nebo Chapel, Efailwen

The parish church, at Llandre (grid ref. SN153233), near Login, is disused and now a clothing factory.

Other places of worship in the community are:

- Calfaria Particular Baptist Chapel, Login, dating from 1828 (grid ref. SN165233)
- Nebo Independent Chapel, Efailwen / Eglwyswen, 1836 (grid ref. SN139257)
- Cwm-miles Independent Chapel, Cwm-miles, 1858 (grid ref. SN162223)

Preceding station	Historical railways	Following station
Whitland via Llanfalteg	Great Western Railway; Whitland & Cardigan Railway	Rhydowen via Llanglydwen
