= Bringing Back the Bluestones =

Premiere
- Date premiered: 2002
- Official website

Bringing Back the Bluestones is a stage play by Derek Webb about a pressure group from Pembrokeshire campaigning to have the Stonehenge bluestones returned to Wales. It followed the fortunes of Roy Brown as he sets up the group, Carreg Las (Welsh for "Blue Stone"), and campaigns for the return of the stones to the Preseli Hills.

== History ==
The play began as a short radio play by Derek Webb, but was developed into a stage play in 2002. The original production caused a sensation in Wales when the Western Mail (a leading Welsh newspaper) carried an article reporting the premise the play was based on as true. It was alleged that Carreg Las had argued that since Greece wanted the Elgin Marbles back, Wales should be able to lay claim to the Bluestones. The Western Mail ran a front-page article, a leader column comment, and devoted a full colour half page to the story. Eminent historians and politicians were consulted. A spokesperson for English Heritage, which looks after Stonehenge, reportedly "almost choked when asked about the possibility of dismantling Stonehenge". The story was subsequently taken up by other newspapers and radio stations throughout Wales and in Wiltshire. However, it turned out that the creation of Carreg Las was a spoof designed to generate publicity for the play.

== Other developments ==
In 2004, a few years after the first production, British Archaeology carried the following story:

Dr Robin Lewis, Archdruid of the Welsh Gorsedd of Bards, wrote to the Daily Telegraph: "Since the Stone of Scone was returned to Scotland a few years since, and it is clearly only a matter of time until the Elgin Marbles are returned to Greece, may I express a request that Stonehenge be returned to Wales?" Dr Lewis's appeal, made "on behalf of my fellow druids, bards and the rest of my Welsh compatriots", is not without precedent. Welsh pressure group Carreg Glas made a similar claim on Stonehenge in 2002, which turned out to be a prank to publicise a play called Bringing Back the Bluestones by Derek Webb. Carreg Glas' mad scheme won real-life supporters, so perhaps Archdruid Lewis' voice won’t be a lone one.

The story was also reported by the Milford Mercury and the BBC.

== Recent adaptations ==
The play was rewritten in 2010 for a performance by Fluellen Theatre Company at the Swansea Grand Theatre, as part of their Lunchtime Theatre programme. This new 1-act version subsequently transferred to deValence in Tenby and on to Theatr Gwaun in Fishguard where it attracted record audiences. The main character in the play, Roy Brown, has subsequently been developed in a further comedy entitled Roy Brown: Untitled in which Roy sees modern art as a way of making quick money and turns out a number of "artworks" in quick succession. The play was premiered in 2010 at Swansea's Grand Theatre. Webb is the author of several other plays which have been premiered at the theatre. His most recent play was commemorating the 100th anniversary of the first flight from the UK to Ireland by Denys Corbett Wilson in April 1912.
