= Llanboidy =

Village and community in Carmarthenshire, Wales

Coordinates: 51°52′45″N 4°35′33″W

- Community
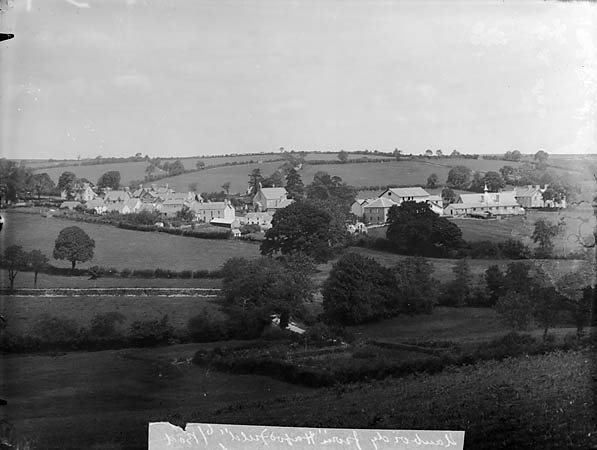
- Llanboidy c.1885

- Location within Carmarthenshire
- Principal area: Carmarthenshire
- Country: Wales
- Sovereign state: United Kingdom
- Police: Dyfed-Powys
- Fire: Mid and West Wales
- Ambulance: Welsh
- List of places UK Wales Carmarthenshire Map of the community

Llanboidy is a village and community in Carmarthenshire, West Wales. The community includes the village of Llanglydwen.

== Location ==
According to the 2001 United Kingdom Census, the community had a population of 988 rising to 1,061 at the 2011 Census.

It is located near the border with Pembrokeshire close to the Landsker Line. The village itself is on the Welsh speaking side.

The community is bordered by the communities of: Llanwinio; Llangynin; St Clears; Eglwyscummin; Whitland; Henllanfallteg; and Cilymaenllwyd, all being in Carmarthenshire; and by Crymych in Pembrokeshire.

== Governance ==
An electoral ward in the same name exists. This ward stretches beyond the boundaries of Llanboidy. The population of the ward taken at the 2011 census was 2,087.

== History and amenities ==
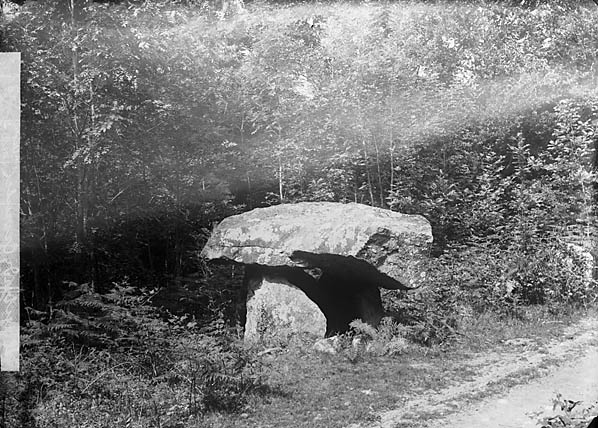
A nearby cromlech, photographed by John Thomas in about 1885

Llanboidy is a scenic village in West Carmarthenshire, Wales. Its history goes back to the Iron Age where the site of a timber built fort can be seen near the village centre. 'Llanboidy' may mean church (Llan) of the cowshed (beudy) and its name probably is linked to St. Brynach. Brynach was a wandering 5th century Irish saint who got shipwrecked off the South Wales coast, returning to Ireland from a tour to Brittany. He founded several West Wales churches and the village church is named after and dedicated to him.

Another notable church he founded is at the village of Nevern. This is approximately 20 miles north west of Llanboidy and is overlooked by Carn Ingli (said by some to mean Mountain of Angels).

Llanboidy then became an important drovers road route in the Middle Ages and once had four taverns.

It has a sports and social club and a football (soccer) team. There is a village post office and the school has recently been re-built. The church graveyard holds a very precious statue, called "the Grief", by the Cardiff-born sculptor Sir William Goscombe John. It was slowly deteriorating, until it was restored and brought indoors, in order to preserve it. It was a funerary monument to the Victorian era MP Walter Rice Howell Powell. Powell was a Haverfordwest-born 1819 philanthropist who brought money and jobs to the village and his legacy can be seen at the Market Hall, Piccadilly Square and other fine buildings in the village. The seat of the Powells was the mansion of Maesgwynne, north of the village.
