= Banc Du =

Hilltop in Pembrokeshire, Wales

Coordinates: 51.940°N 4.821°W

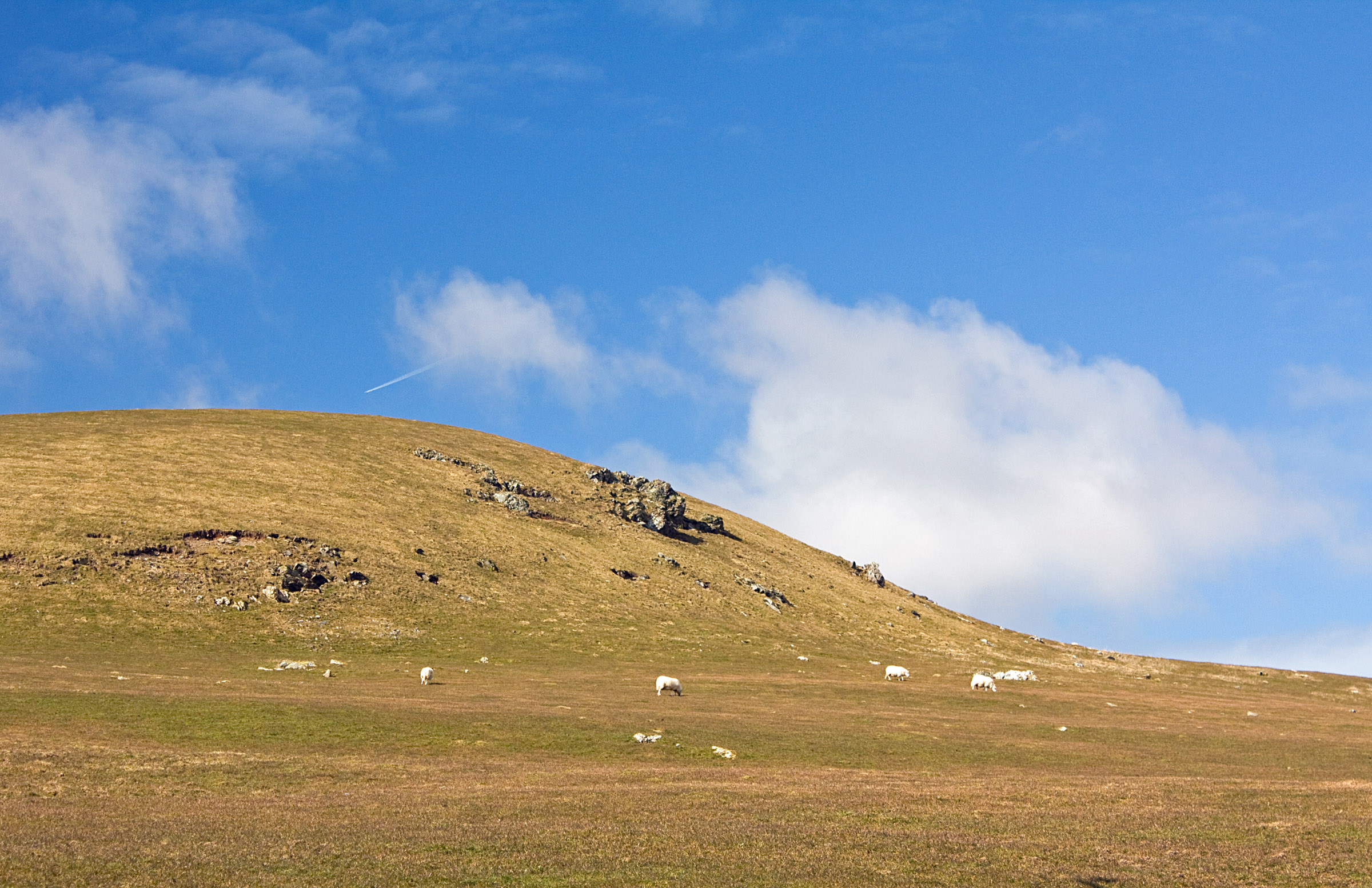
Site of Banc Du

Banc Du is a prominent, fairly flat-topped southwards-projecting promontory of Foel Eryr, at about 334m OD at the west end of the Preseli Hills in north Pembrokeshire, Wales. First spotted during an aerial photographic survey of the region in 1990, this hilltop enclosure consists of two non-concentric and incomplete earthworks that define a roughly oval area around the hilltop, amidst a series of cultivation features and abandoned trackways.

There is a crag-line on the south-east side and steep slopes to the south and west. It overlooks the source of the Afon Syfynwy to the south-east, and afford extensive views to the south and west. Neither upland not lowland, Banc Du occupies a curious position between enclosed fields and open moor, clearly cultivated in the past, but now maintained as improved pasture for grazing sheep.

== Phases of occupation ==
Surveys suggest three main periods of activity across the hill. The most recent comprises extensive ridge and furrow cultivation probably associated with a now-abandoned, putatively medieval or later, long house settlement or small hamlet downslope to the north-west. Earlier than this are two curved trackways that seem to provide access to a single long-house dwelling or structure. It is currently unclear whether these are contemporary or successive.

The earthworks of the earliest visible phase show an inner boundary defining an oval space that is perhaps open against the cragline on the east side. Outside is an outer boundary that appears to start on the cragline, cross the neck of the promontory on the north side, and then curve around the west side to run close and parallel to the inner boundary to the south.

A single evaluation trench was opened in August 2005. This demonstrated that the bank, about 3.8m wide, was preserved to c. 40 cm, and had been apparently set onto an old, deturfed land surface. Postholes towards the front and rear were suggestive of a timber lacing within the bank. The ditch was 2.8m wide and a maximum of 1m deep with a U-shaped profile. Radiocarbon dates obtained through the AHRC-funded Neolithic Enclosure Dating Project show that the initial silt accumulated at around 3650 BC, whilst the middle fills contained material from the period 3000-2600 BC.

Examination of pollen evidence concludes that the enclosure was built in a heath-dominated landscape with some local scrubby woodland including oak and hazel.

== Significance ==
Although small scale, Banc Du has profound implications for the understanding of occupation of the area in the fourth and third millennia BC. The first confirmed neolithic enclosure in Wales and the mid west of Britain, it is also notable for the fact that visible earthworks survive at ground level. When first built, it would have been contemporary with the great megalithic tombs such as the long barrow at Pentre Ifan just 7.5 km to the north, and the passage grave at Bedd yr Afanc 6 km to the north-east.
