= Foel Drygarn =

Iron Age hillfort in Pembrokeshire, Wales

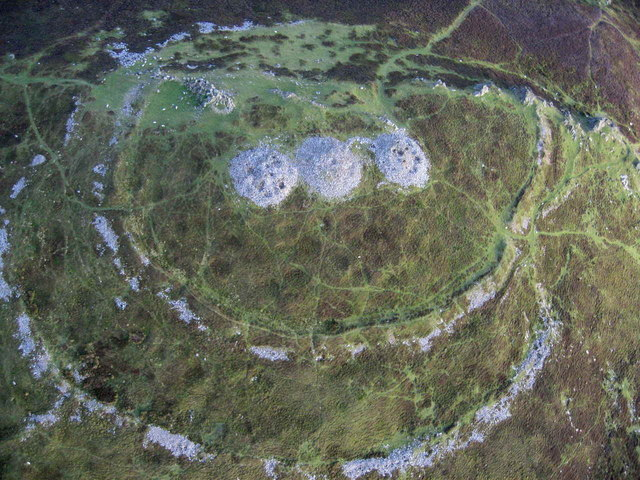
- Aerial view looking southwards

- Location within Pembrokeshire
- 51°58′14″N 4°41′1″W
- Type: Hillfort
- Periods: Bronze Age; Iron Age
- Location: Near Crymych, Wales
- OS grid reference: SN 158 336

Site notes
- Area: 1.2 hectares (3.0 acres)

Foel Drygarn ('The hill of the three cairns') is an Iron Age hillfort, within which are three Bronze Age burial cairns. The site is about 1.5 miles (2 km) west of the village of Crymych in Pembrokeshire, Wales. It is a scheduled monument.

== Description ==
The hill, the furthest east of the Preseli Hills, can be seen from miles around, and the fort was probably an important centre in its time. An inner defence on the summit encloses 1.2 hectares (3.0 acres); outside this are defences built at later stages on the north and east side. Each are single ramparts of dry stone and earth; there are traces of a ditch outside the inner rampart.

Within the inner defence are three stone cairns, regarded as Bronze Age burial mounds. In the fort there are at least 227 hut platforms. The remains represent a long period of occupation of the fort, and it is supposed that not all the dwellings were in use at the same time. Their builders evidently respected their Bronze Age predecessors, as the cairns were not plundered for the stone.

Sabine Baring-Gould, excavating the site in 1899, found Iron Age and Roman pottery, glass beads and many sling stones.

== See also ==
- Hillforts in Britain
- List of Scheduled prehistoric Monuments in south Pembrokeshire
