= Bedd Arthur =

Standing stones

Coordinates: 51°57′35″N 4°42′57″W

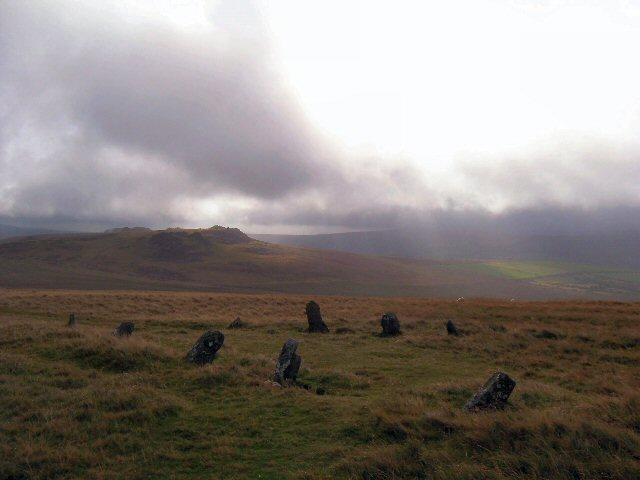
Bedd Arthur

Bedd Arthur and other nearby Neolithic sites. (The area in green is within the Pembrokeshire Coast National Park)

Bedd Arthur ("Arthur's Grave") is a possibly Neolithic hengiform monument megalithic site in the Preseli Hills in the Welsh county of Pembrokeshire. Thirteen upright stones and at least 2 fallen ones, each around 0.6 metres (2.0 ft) high form an oval horseshoe with similarities to the earliest form of Stonehenge.

== Description ==
Bedd Arthur consists of a barely visible oval bank and ditch, with thirteen standing stones, none higher than 60 centimetres (24 in) arranged inside along with two further fallen stones. The stone layout measures around 20 by 10 metres (66 by 33 ft). The shape is not well defined and is generally described as sub-rectangular but has been described as a rectangle, a horseshoe, an oval and a pointed ellipse. Such arrangements of stones are also found at a site known as the 'Churchyard' on Skomer Island, and were adopted at Stonehenge, for which and Bedd Arthur has been speculatively suggested as a prototype.

The stones appear to be leaning inwards, suggesting that they were originally placed on the flanks of a mound which has since disappeared. There is also one "truncated end", similar to the portal on some elongated Neolithic burial mounds. There may have been a burial chamber in the middle of the stone setting: it would not be exceptional for the mound itself to have been removed by erosion or grave hunters, as may have happened to the Bedd yr Afanc passage grave on the northern side of Mynydd Preseli.

== Name ==
It is one of many sites in the British Isles to be claimed by local folklore as the burial place of King Arthur. The name Bedd Arthur means Arthur's Grave. There are numerous prehistoric sites around Pembrokeshire, claiming an association with Arthur. In the vicinity of Bedd Arthur, there are the Cromlechau Meibion Arthur in Nevern, Garn Arthur and Cerrig Meibion Arthur in Mynachiog-Ddu, and Bwrdd Arthur in Llanboidy

== Stonehenge connection ==
It sits on top of the Preseli ridge and overlooks the rocky outcrop of Carn Menyn, a site that has been suggested as a source for some of the bluestones used at Stonehenge. A 2011 study of a particular group of the Stonehenge bluestones made of a Rhyolite material identified a geological match with an outcrop at Rhosyfelin, 3 kilometres (1.9 miles) north of Bedd Arthur. On the other hand, a 2015 archaeological studies at Rhosyfelin failed to identify any signs of quarrying, which appears to promote the possibility of the stones as glacial erratics carried east on an ice-flow, rather than a Neolithic cultural link between the two places.

== Site ==
The site has not been excavated and is absent from authoritative surveys. Its authenticity as a site, and any relationship to Stonehenge or local sources of stone are therefore unconfirmed.

The site is in Eglwyswrw community, and is a Scheduled monument with legal protection from disturbance and is within the Pembrokeshire Coast National Park.

== See also ==
- List of Scheduled prehistoric Monuments in north Pembrokeshire
