= Henllanfallteg =

Community in Carmarthenshire, Wales

Coordinates: 51.849°N 4.647°W

- Community
- Location within Carmarthenshire
- Principal area: Carmarthenshire
- Country: Wales
- Sovereign state: United Kingdom
- Police: Dyfed-Powys
- Fire: Mid and West Wales
- Ambulance: Welsh
- List of places UK Wales Carmarthenshire Map of the community

Henllanfallteg (Welsh: Henllan Fallteg) is a community in the west of Carmarthenshire, Wales. It comprises the villages of Cwmfelin Boeth, Henllan Amgoed, Hiraeth, Llanfallteg, and Rhydywrach. The community population taken at the 2011 census was 480.

The community is bordered by the communities of: Cilymaenllwyd; Llanboidy; and Whitland, all being in Carmarthenshire; and by Llanddewi Velfrey and Clynderwen in Pembrokeshire.
