= Mynydd Carningli =

Hill in Pembrokeshire, Wales

Coordinates: 51.99843°N 4.82450°W

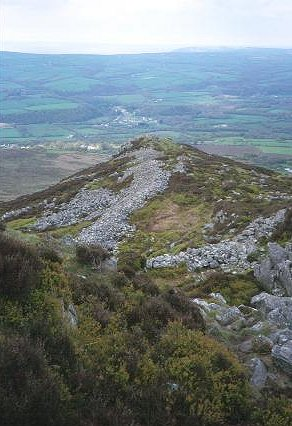
- Mynydd Carningli

Highest point
- Elevation: 346 m (1,135 ft)
- Prominence: 232 m (761 ft)
- Parent peak: Foel Cwmcerwyn
- Listing: Marilyn

Naming
- English translation: Angel–rock mountain
- Language of name: Welsh
- Pronunciation: Welsh: [ˈmənɪð karnˈɪŋli]

Geography
- Location: Pembrokeshire, Wales
- Parent range: Preseli Hills
- OS grid: SN062371
- Topo map: OS Landranger 145

Geology
- Last eruption: 450 million years ago

Mynydd Carningli is a mountain in the Preseli Hills near the town of Newport, Pembrokeshire, Wales. It has both prehistoric and historic remains.

== Topography ==
Carningli (or Carn Ingli) is 347 metres (1,138 ft) high. Close to the coast, it dominates the surrounding countryside. It is easy to climb but has a rocky summit and a steep scree slope on its southern and eastern flanks. It is a biological SSSI.

== Carningli Hillfort ==
The summit features a large and prominent archeological site; one of the largest hillforts in west Wales. This hillfort, generally dated to the Iron Age and assumed to be from the first millennium BC. It covers an area of about 4 ha, and is about 400 m x 150 m in extent. The lower slopes of Carningli are covered with traces of Bronze Age settlement (Pearson 2001) and so some features of the hillfort may be even older. Although not one of the largest fortified sites in Wales, it is certainly one of the most complex, incorporating a series of substantial stone embankments, natural rock cliffs and scree slopes which may have been used as natural defences. Inside and outside the embankments are terraced enclosures, hut circles and rectangles. Approximately 25 hut circles are at the north east end of the site. On the other side are three enclosures separated by embankments. Beneath the scree slope on the eastern flank of the mountain are two further massive defensive embankments. The only plan is that of Hogg 1973 - it has been modified by Figgis. According to Hogg, there are signs that some of the defensive embankments and walls had been intentionally demolished, which he attributed as "evidence for systematic destruction by Roman invaders in the aftermath of the conquest of Wales". The Royal Commission on the Ancient and Historical Monuments of Wales noted in 2009 that "Such a dramatic interpretation, placing the Roman legions on the slopes of Carn-ingli in an attack on its inhabitants, might be questioned today".

There are records of intermittent occupation of the site in Post-Roman Wales and the Age of the Saints, and as recently as the Middle Ages. No comprehensive excavations of the hillfort have been made.

As with other upland defended sites, the economy of the tribe which inhabited Carningli was probably a pastoral one. The site is very exposed, and it is quite possible that it was only seasonally inhabited.

The site is referred to in the Cadw Guide to Ancient and Historic Wales (1992) by Sian Rees, and in NP Figgis's "Prehistoric Preseli" (2001).

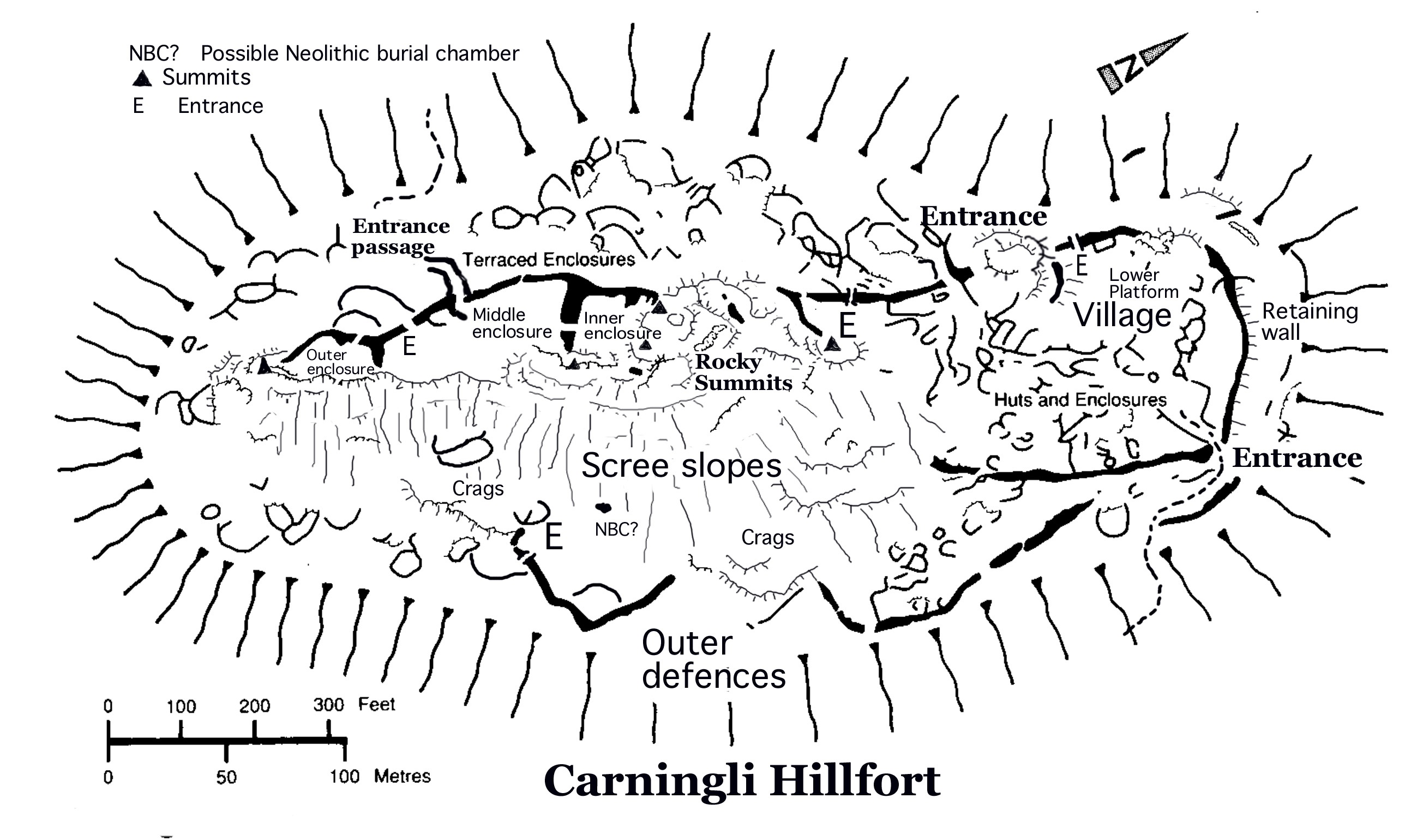
Map of Carningli hillfort by Brian John

== Sacred association ==
According to legend Saint Brynach (a local saint) used to climb to the summit to find serenity, to pray and to "commune with the angels" in the 5th century. In some old texts and maps the mountain is called Carn Yengly or Carnengli, which are probably corruptions of Carn Engylau. Strictly, this would be translated as "the rocky summit of the angels." However, this derivation of the name is not universally agreed.

== Local literature ==
Brian John's self-published "Angel Mountain Saga" of eight volumes, recounts the life of Mistress Martha Morgan of Plas Ingli. These books were published between 2001 and 2012. The mountain is the heroine's personal sanctuary.

== Industry ==
There was once a little "mountain railway" on Carningli, carrying broken stone from a small quarry down to a crushing plant on the Cilgwyn Road. Some railway sleepers can still be found in the turf, but otherwise the only traces remaining are the two stone pillars that supported a cable drum — a cable was used to control the descent of the loaded wagons as they rolled downhill, and then to pull the empty ones back up again. This little industry was abandoned before 1930.

== See also ==
- List of hillforts in Wales
