= Carn Ingli =

Protected area in Pembrokeshire, Wales

- Site of Special Scientific Interest
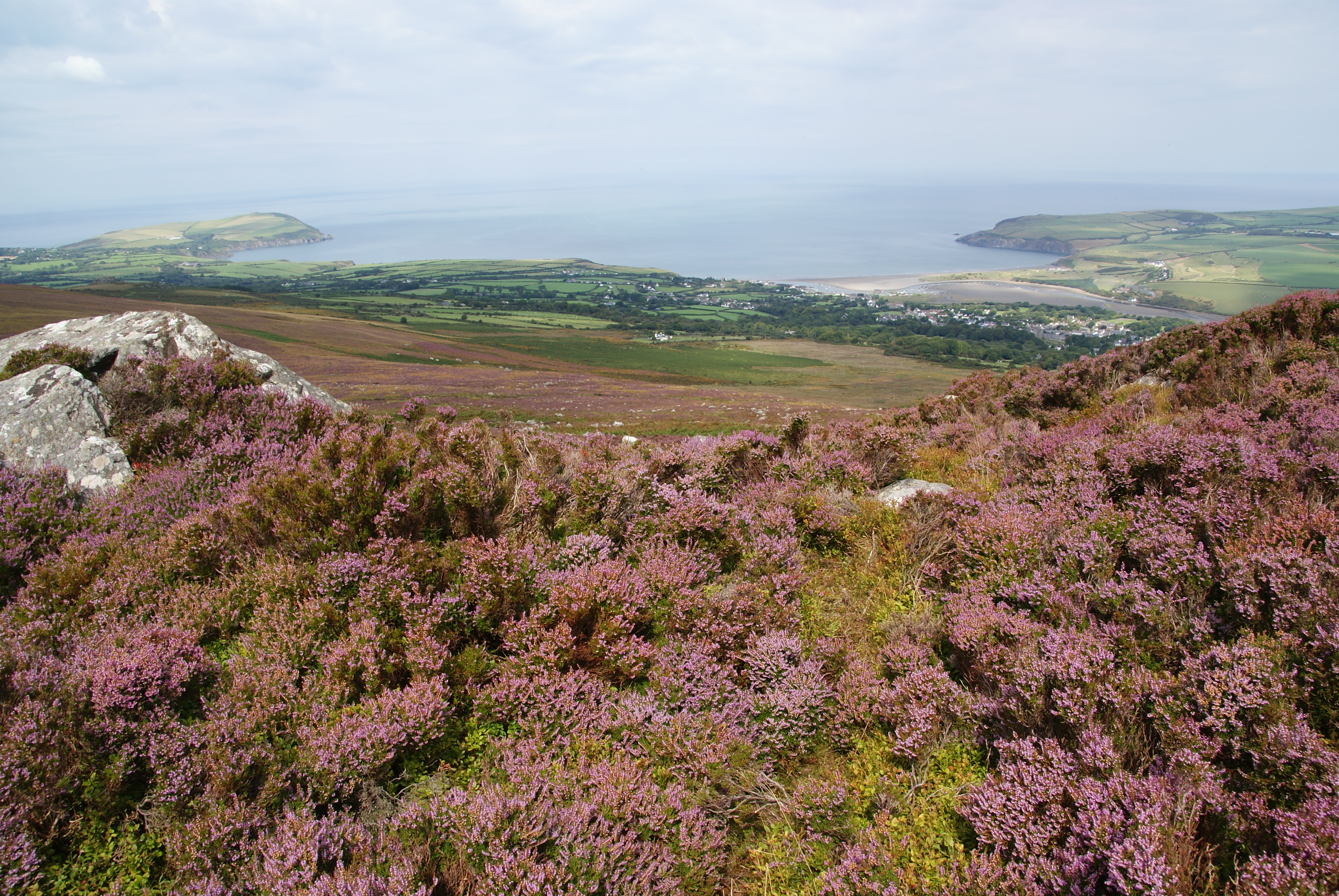
- On top of Carn Ingli

- Location within Pembrokeshire
- Location of Carn Ingli.
- Area of search: Pembrokeshire
- Grid reference: SN0548837415
- Coordinates: 52.001°N 4.835°W
- Interest: Biological
- Area: 428.4 ha (1,059 acres)
- Notification date: 1954

Carn Ingli (Welsh: [karn ˈɪŋli]) is a Site of Special Scientific Interest (SSSI) in the Preseli Hills, Pembrokeshire, Wales. It was designated a SSSI in January 1954 in an attempt to protect its fragile biological elements. The site has an area of 428.4 hectares (1,059 acres) and is managed by Natural Resources Wales.

== Type ==
This site is designated due to its biological qualities. SSSIs in Wales have been notified for a total of 142 different animal species and 191 different plant species.

It is the oceanic heathland vegetation which makes this area special. Rock outcrops and associated blockfields add to the diversity as does the small areas of spring-fed flushes. The area also includes several scarce plants, including lichens, and a rare damselfly, Coenagrion mercuriale.

== See also ==
- List of Sites of Special Scientific Interest in Pembrokeshire
- Mynydd Carningli
