= Theatr Gwaun =

Cinema and theatre in Pembrokeshire, Wales

Coordinates: 51.995094°N 4.978792°W

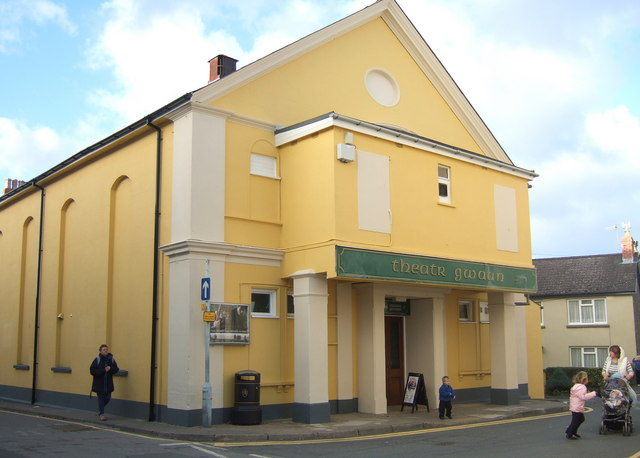
The theatre in 2006

Theatr Gwaun is a cinema/theatre in Fishguard, Pembrokeshire.

Built in 1885 as a Temperance hall, it was briefly converted for use as a school in January 1895 before being converted into a cinema in the 1920s. Originally, the building was known as The Studio Cinema, a sister to the Studio Cinema in Bristol. The Studio Cinema was taken over by the local authority as a going concern and was run by the Smedley family until 1993, when management was transferred under Preseli Pembrokeshire District Council to Emyr Bateman. The cinema retained much of its original features until refurbishment. During 1994 the venue was refurbished and its name was changed to Theatr Gwaun, still owned and managed by Preseli Pembrokeshire District Council (succeeded in 1996 by Pembrokeshire County Council). The venue consisted of 180 seats with easy access. The differing forms of entertainment it offers include cinema, jazz, youth theatre and many others. In 2010 the theatre was under threat of closure by Pembrokeshire County Council, which now owned it. A group was formed to fight the closure, called Friends of Theatr Gwaun, which has subsequently taken over the management of the theatre on a lease from the council.

In 2018 the Theatr Gwaun Community Trust acquired ownership of the building via a Community Asset Transfer.
