= Craig Rhos-y-felin =

Coordinates: 51°59′31″N 4°44′40″W

Craig Rhos-y-felin is a rocky outcrop on the north side of the Preseli Mountains in Wales, which is designated as a RIGS site on the basis of its geological and geomorphological interest. It is accepted by some in the archaeological community that it is the site of a quarry, used together with one at Carn Goedog, for gathering stones used at Stonehenge, most notably as the source of some of the foliated rhyolite found in the Stonehenge "debitage". This is disputed by others, who believe that all of the features at the site, apart from evidence of intermittent occupation over a long period, are of natural origin. Some believe that the site was used as a quarry in both the Neolithic and Bronze Ages, around 4000 to 5000 years ago, and the rock's shape, like a pillar, allowed the stones to be quarried with relative ease compared to stones taken from other places. Others argue that if prehistoric men had wanted to obtain monoliths for use as standing stones, all they had to do was collect them from the abundant glacial erratics littering the landscape.

Craig Rhos-y-felin was first claimed to be the site of a quarry in 2011. The cited evidence was disputed in two journal articles published in 2015 by Brian John, Dyfed Elis-Gruffydd and John Downes.
