= Foel Cwmcerwyn =

Highest point (536m) in the Preseli Mountains, Pembrokeshire, Wales

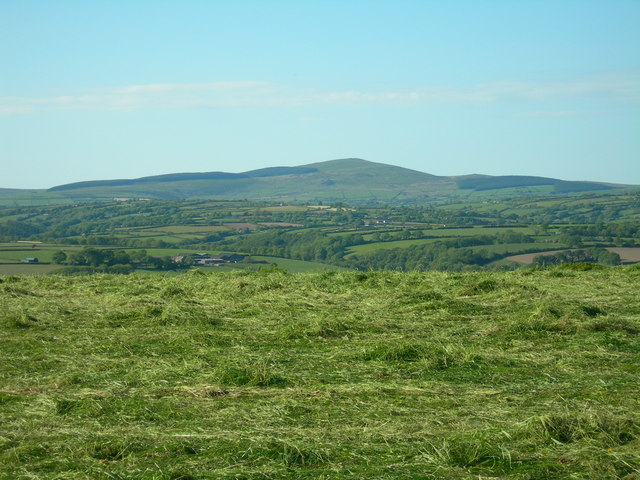

Highest point
- Elevation: 536 m (1,759 ft)
- Prominence: 344 m (1,129 ft)
- Parent peak: Plynlimon
- Listing: Marilyn, Council top
- Coordinates: 51°56′44″N 4°46′29″W

Naming
- English translation: vat-valley hill
- Language of name: Welsh
- Pronunciation: Welsh: [vɔi̯l kʊmˈkɛrwɪn]

Geography
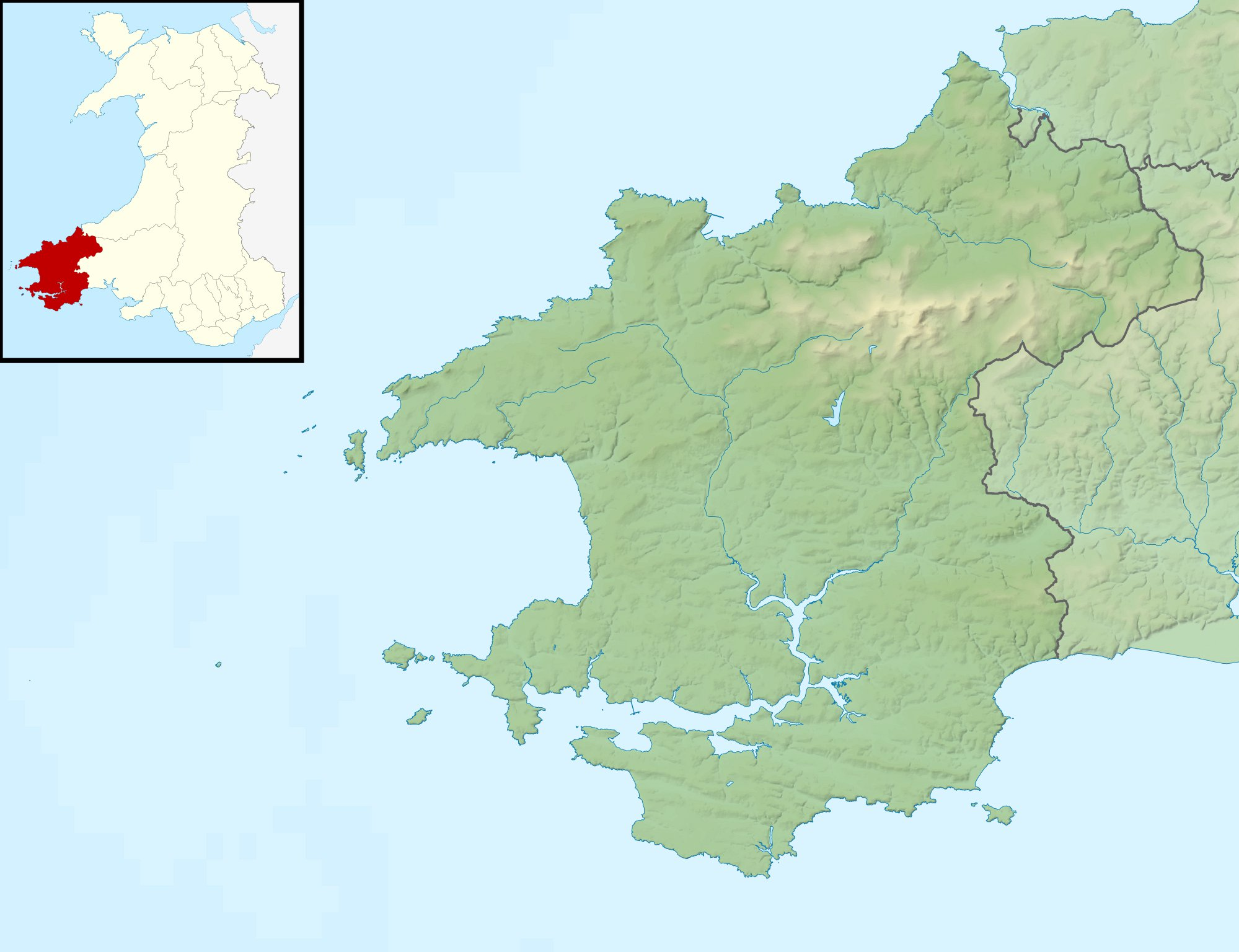
- Location within Pembrokeshire
- Location: Preseli Hills, Wales
- OS grid: SN094311
- Topo map: OS Landranger 145

Foel Cwmcerwyn is the highest point of the Preseli Mountains and of Pembrokeshire.

== Location ==
Foel Cwmcerwyn lies within the borders of the Pembrokeshire Coast National Park, which includes most of the Preselis. A path leads to the summit from the village of Rosebush in the southwest.

== Features ==
A trig point and a number of cairns are dotted across the summit area, and there is a disused quarry on the hill's western slopes as well as managed forest.

The peak features on numerous walking routes and trails.

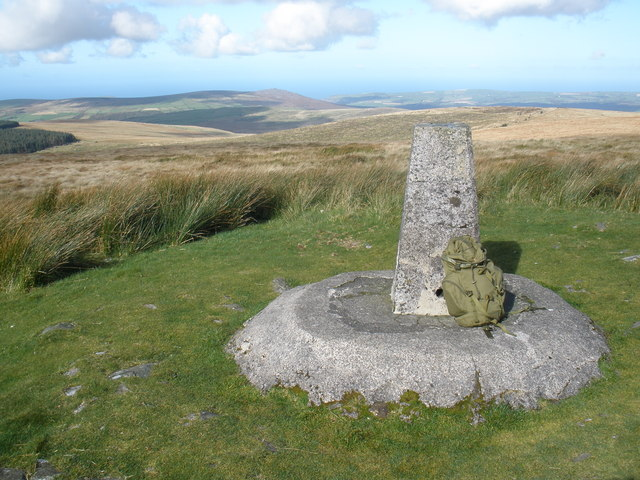
Summit of Foel Cwmcerwyn

== Burial cairn ==
A Bronze Age burial cairn close to the summit is listed by the Royal Commission's website Coflein as

occupying a spectacular south-facing spur... The mound is flat-topped, sub-circular, measuring some 18-19m in diameter and being 1.2-1.5m high, apparently undisturbed.
