= Bluestone =

Name for a number of varieties of stone

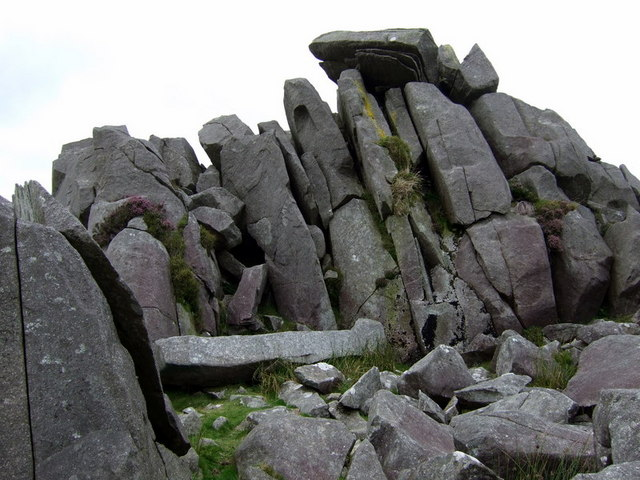
Carn Menyn bluestones. These dolerite slabs, split by frost action, seem to be stacked ready for the taking, and many have been removed over the centuries for local use. Research favours the theory that humans also transported stones from Carn Menyn to build Stonehenge, about 250 km away.

Bluestone is a cultural or commercial name for a number of natural dimension or building stone varieties, including:

- basalt in Victoria, Australia, and in New Zealand
- dolerites in Tasmania, Australia; and in Britain (including Stonehenge)
- feldspathic sandstone in the US and Canada
- limestone in the Shenandoah Valley in the US, from the Hainaut quarries in Soignies, Belgium, and from quarries in County Carlow, County Galway and County Kilkenny in Ireland
- slate in South Australia

It is unrelated to human-made blue brick.

== Stonehenge ==
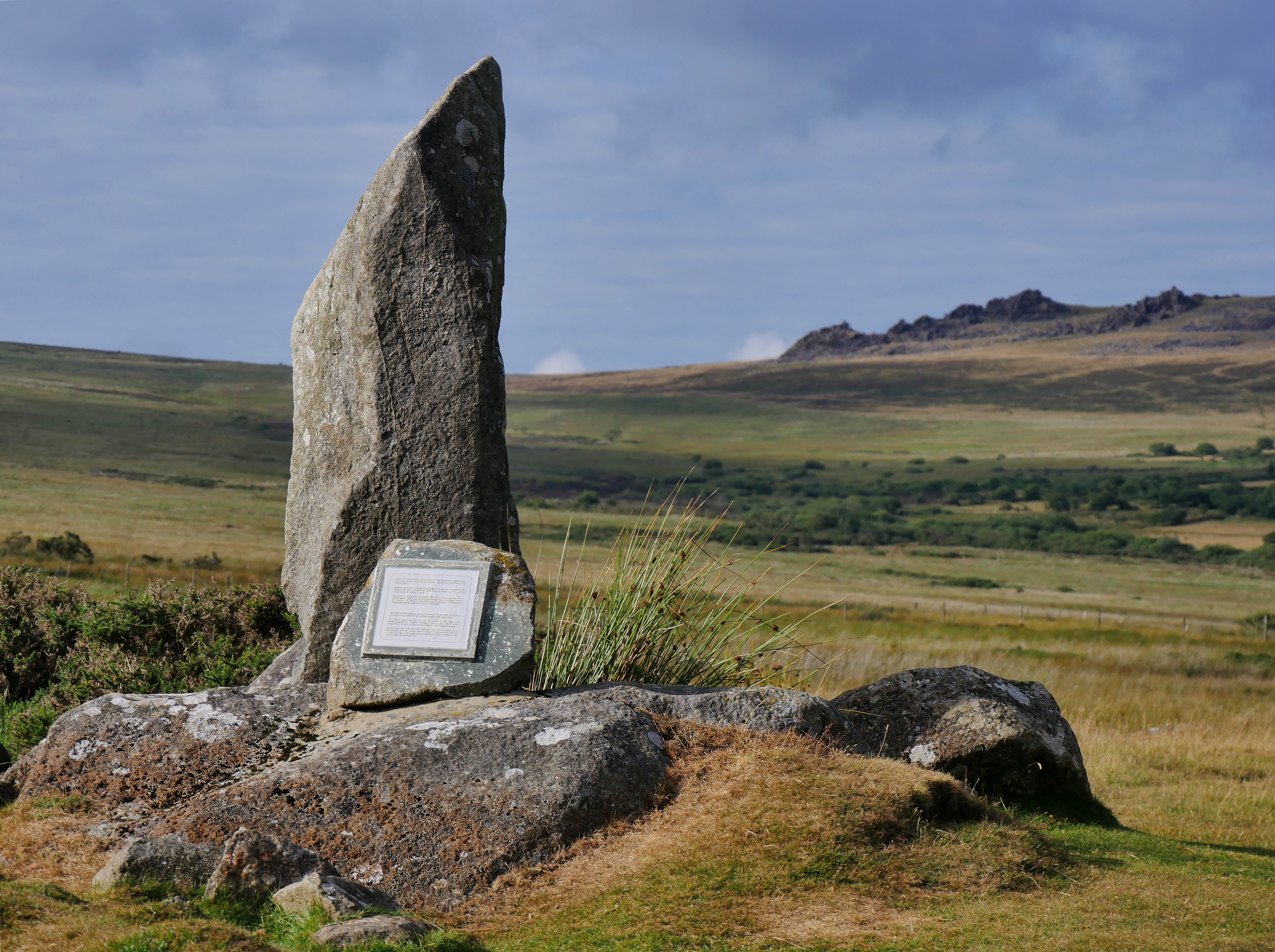
Bluestone monument and Carn Menyn, Preseli Hills

The term "bluestone" in Britain is used in a loose sense to cover all of the "foreign", not intrinsic, stones and rock debris at Stonehenge. It is a "convenience" label rather than a geological term, since at least 46 different rock types are represented. One of the most common rocks in the assemblage is known as Preseli spotted dolerite—a chemically altered igneous rock containing spots or clusters of secondary minerals replacing plagioclase feldspar. It is a medium grained dark and heavy rock, harder than granite.

Preseli bluestone tools, such as axes, have been discovered elsewhere within the British Isles. Many of them appear to have been made in or near Stonehenge, since there are petrographic similarities with some of the spotted dolerites there. The bluestones at Stonehenge were first used there during the third phase of construction at Stonehenge around 2300 BC. It is assumed that there were about 80 monoliths originally, but this has never been proven since only 43 remain. The stones are estimated to weigh between 2 and 4 tons each. The majority of them are believed to have come from the Preseli Hills, about 250 kilometres (160 mi) away in Wales, either through glaciation (glacial erratic theory) or through humans organizing their transportation.

=== Glacial erratic theory ===
A summary of the major aspects of the Stonehenge "bluestone conundrum" was published in 2008. In 2018 a book devoted specifically to the problem of bluestone provenance and transport concluded that the Stonehenge bluestones are essentially an ill-sorted assemblage of glacial erratics. Much further research into the origin of the bluestones has been published between 2012 and 2022 particularly by geologists Richard Bevins and Rob Ixer. If a glacier transported the stones, then it must have been the Irish Sea Glacier. In support of the glacial erratic theory, researchers reporting in 2015 found no firm evidence of quarrying at Rhosyfelin in the Preselis. However, in such event, one might expect to find other bluestone boulders or slabs near the Stonehenge site, but no such bluestones (apart from fragments) have been found.

Recent research challenges the prevailing theory that Stonehenge's Altar Stone originated in northeast Scotland's Orcadian Basin. While previous dating pointed to a Scottish source, a comprehensive multi-proxy analysis of museum samples reveals that the stone's unique petrology, geochemistry and mineralogy do not match the Old Red Sandstone outcrops of the Orcadian Basin or any other examined UK location. As a result, the exact geographic provenance of the Altar Stone remains unknown.

=== Human transport theory ===
The archaeological find of the Boscombe Bowmen has been cited in support of the human transport theory. Preseli Bluestone dolerite axe heads have been found around the Preseli Hills as well, indicating that there was a population who knew how to work with the stones, In 2015, researchers claimed that some of the stones at Stonehenge came from Neolithic quarries at Carn Goedog and Craig Rhos-y-felin in the Preseli Hills. The quarrying hypothesis has been hotly disputed by Brian John, Dyfed Elis-Gruffydd and John Downes, whose own detailed research led to the conclusion that the so-called quarrying features were all natural, created over a long period of glacial and periglacial landscape change. Further, no independent evidence has ever been found to support the thesis of long overland or sea transport of Preseli bluestones from Wales to Salisbury Plain.

== Australia ==
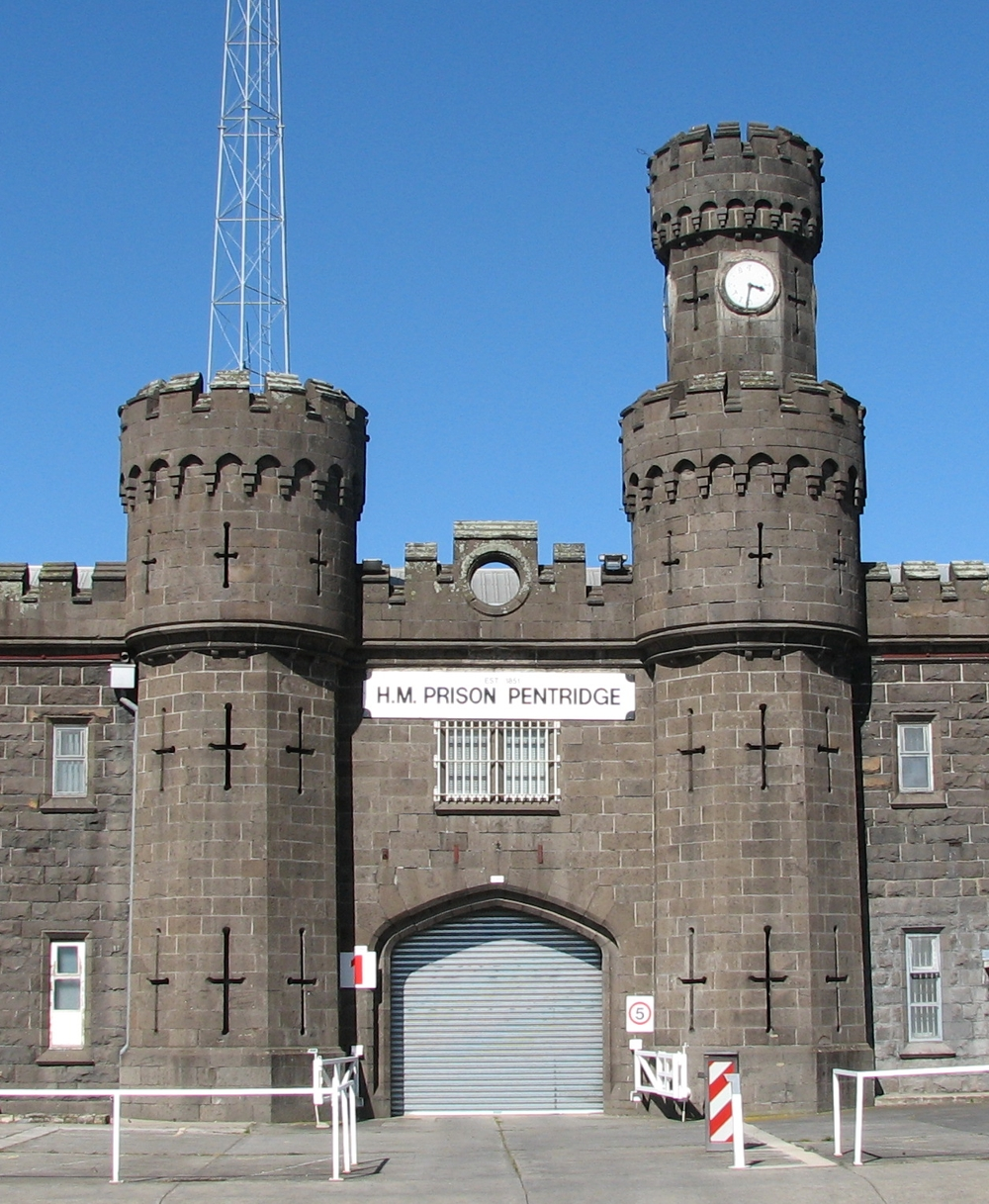
HM Prison Pentridge was one of the many buildings constructed of local bluestone in Melbourne in the 19th century

There are three distinct building materials called "bluestone" in Australia.

=== Victoria ===
In Victoria, what is known as bluestone is a basalt or olivine basalt. It was one of the favoured building materials during the Victorian Gold Rush period of the 1850s. In Melbourne, it was extracted from quarries throughout the inner northern suburbs, such as Clifton Hill, Brunswick and Coburg, where the quarry used to source the stone for Pentridge Prison is now Coburg Lake. Bluestone was also sourced in many other regions of the Victorian volcanic plains, and used in towns and cities in the state's central and western regions, including Ballarat, Geelong, Kyneton, Port Fairy and Portland. It is still quarried at a number of places around the state.

Bluestone is a very hard material and therefore difficult to work, so it was predominantly used for warehouses, miscellaneous walls, and the foundations of buildings. However, a number of significant bluestone buildings exist, including the Old Melbourne Gaol, Pentridge Prison, St Patrick's Cathedral, Victoria Barracks, Melbourne Grammar School, Deaf Children Australia and Victorian College for the Deaf, Vision Australia, the Goldsbrough Mort warehouses (Bourke Street) and the Timeball Tower at Williamstown, as well as St Mary's Basilica in Geelong. Some examples of other major structures that use bluestone include Princes Bridge, the adjacent Federation Wharf, and Hawthorn Bridge. Because of its distinctive qualities, post-modern Melbourne buildings have also made use of bluestone for nostalgic reasons. They include the Southgate complex and the promenade in Southbank, Victoria.

Bluestone was used extensively as cobblestone, and for kerbs and gutters, many examples of which still exist in Melbourne's smaller city lanes, and 19th-century inner-suburban streets and lanes. Crushed bluestone aggregate, known as "blue metal" (or "bluemetal"), is used extensively in Victoria as railway ballast, as road base, and in making concrete. Combined with bitumen, it is used as a road surfacing material.

=== South Australia ===
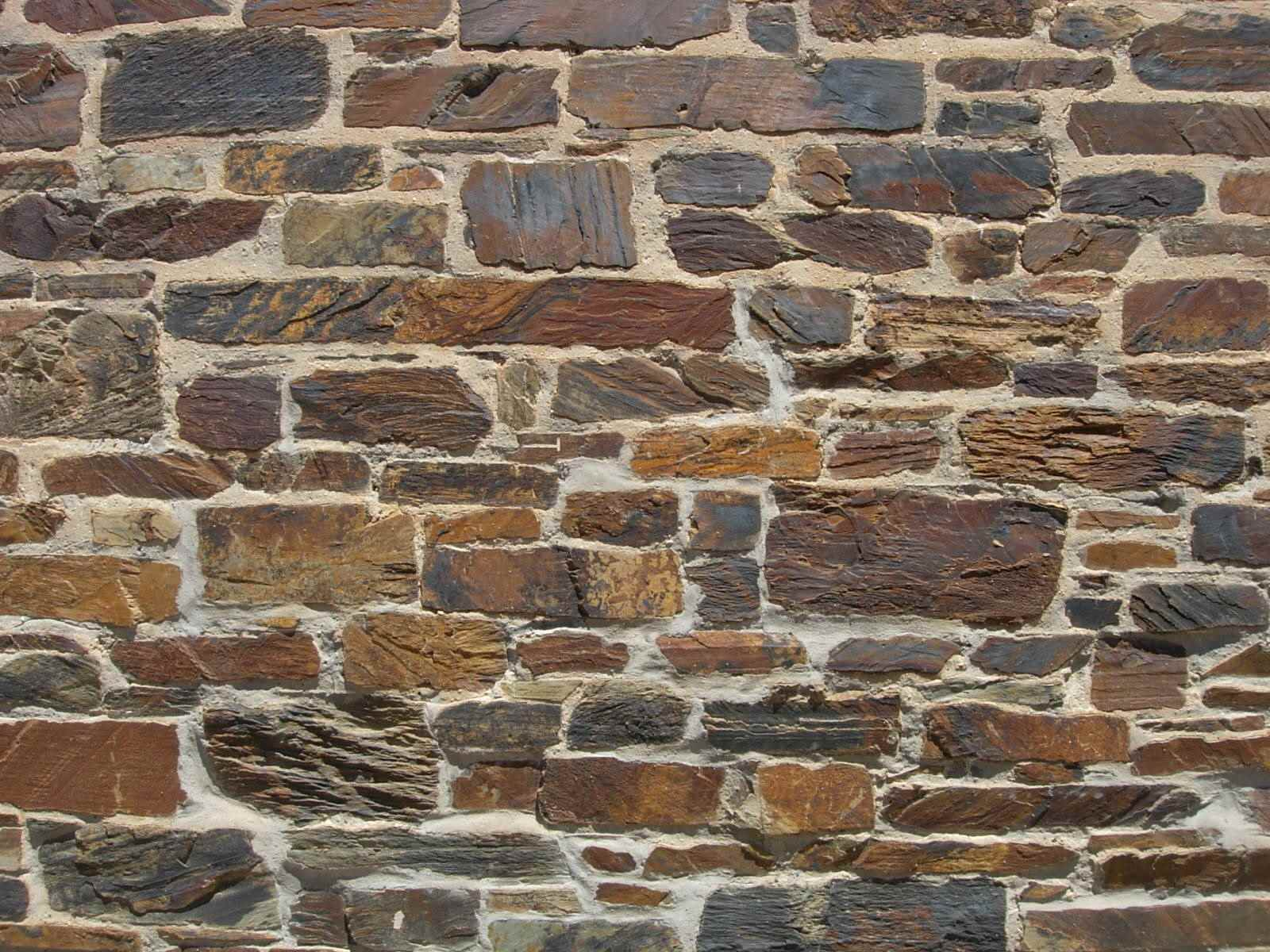
Typical colouring caused by mineralisation in Adelaide bluestone

In South Australia, the name bluestone is given to a form of slate which is much less durable than Victorian bluestone, but was valued for its decorative appearance. The interior of the stone is usually pale grey or beige in colour, but is given attractively coloured surfaces by ferric oxide and other minerals deposited in joints and bedding planes. The slate is laid in masonry with the mineralised surfaces exposed. Bluestone was most popular from about the 1850s to the 1920s, quarried in the Adelaide Hills at Dry Creek, O'Halloran Hill (formerly Tapley's Hill) and Glen Osmond, as well as a number of other places in rural areas.

=== Tasmania ===
In Tasmania, the name bluestone is given to dolerite (diabase), which is a dominant stone variety in the landscape, and used in a variety of building roles.

== New Zealand ==
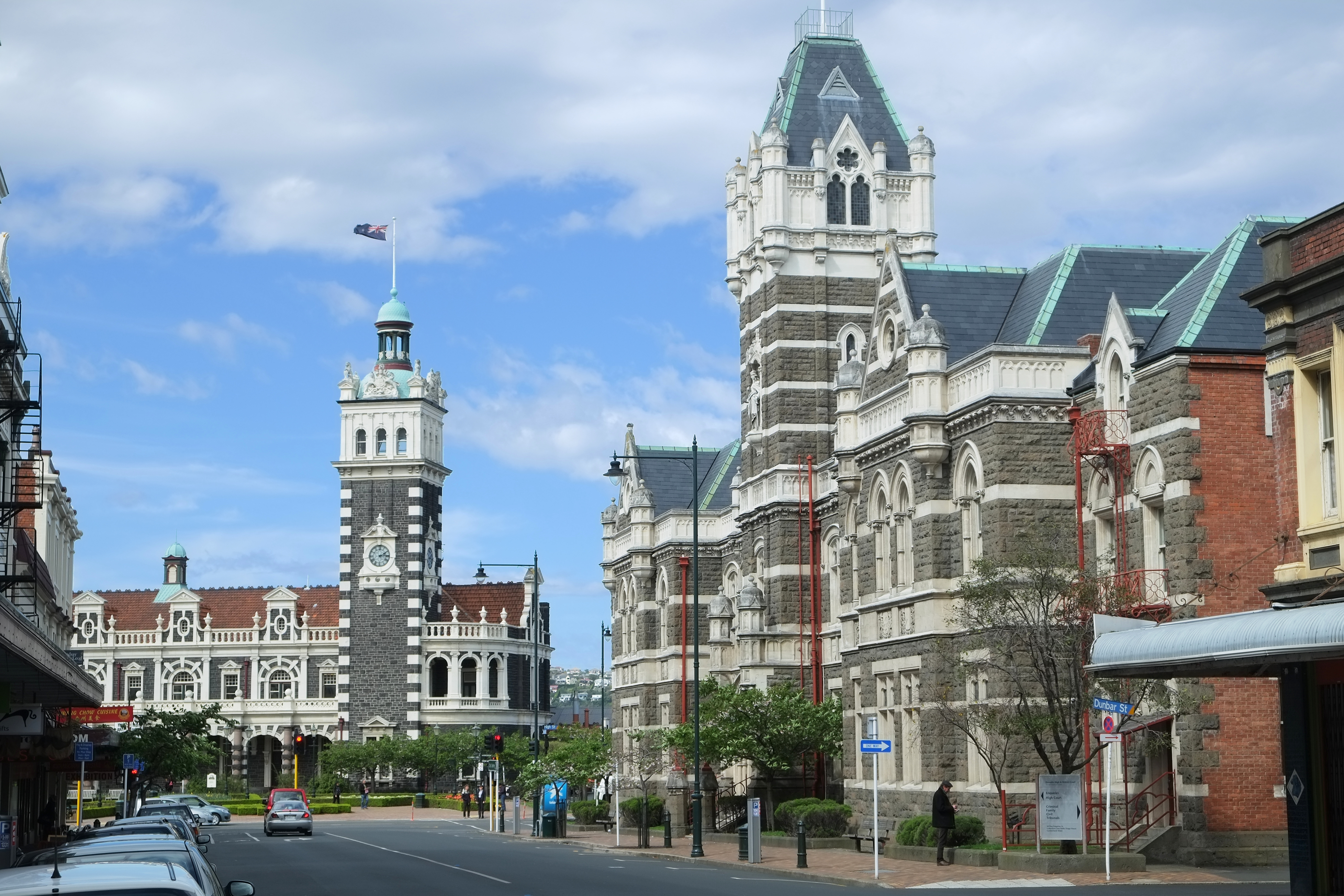
Dunedin Railway Station and Law Courts, New Zealand, showing dark bluestone and creamy Oamaru stone construction

Timaru bluestone (also known as Port Chalmers bluestone) is an attractive building material, used both historically and to the present. It is a grey basalt similar to Victorian bluestone, quarried near Timaru in the South Island. Bluestone from near Kokonga in Central Otago is also widely used, and is the main construction material (often with facing of Oamaru stone, a local compact limestone) in many of the notable historic buildings in the southern South Island, most of which were constructed during the financial boom following the Otago gold rush. Prominent structures to use this combination include Otago University Registry Building, Dunedin Law Courts, and Dunedin Railway Station. Similar construction using Timaru bluestone was used for Christchurch Arts Centre.

== United States and Canada ==
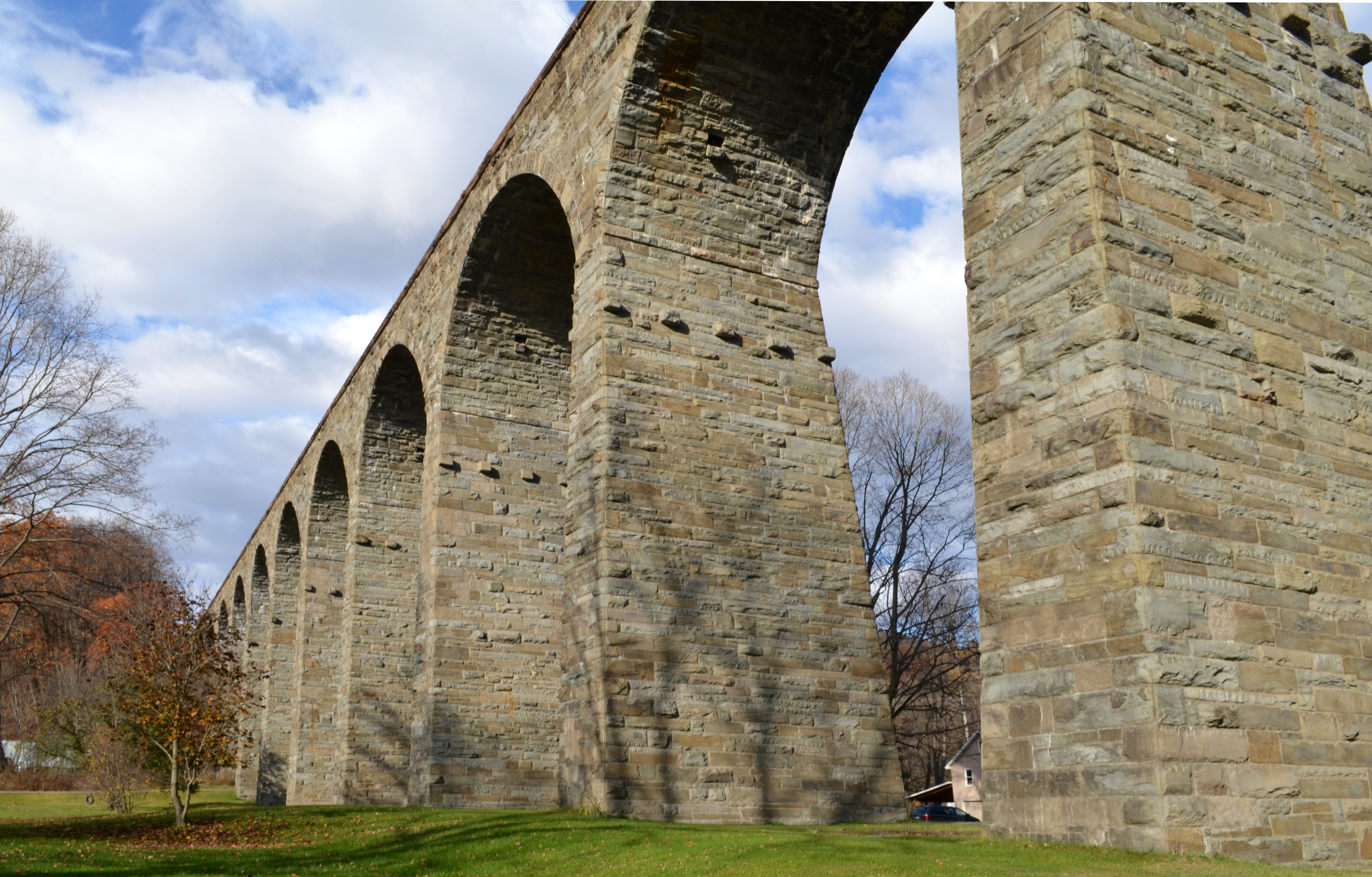
Starrucca Viaduct, Pennsylvania

There are two distinct building materials called "bluestone" in the United States, one of which is also found in Canada.

Bluestone from Pennsylvania and New York is a sandstone defined as feldspathic greywacke. The sand-sized grains from which bluestone is constituted were deposited in the Catskill Delta during the Middle to Upper Devonian Period of the Paleozoic Era, approximately 370 to 345 million years ago. The Catskill Delta was created from runoff from the Acadian Mountains ("Ancestral Appalachians"). This delta ran in a narrow band from southwest to northeast and today provides the bluestone quarried from the Catskill Mountains and Northeastern Pennsylvania. The term "bluestone" is derived from a deep-blue-colored sandstone first found in Ulster County, New York. It can, however, appear in many other hues, mostly shades of grays and browns. Bluestone quarrying is of particular value to the economy of Susquehanna County, Pennsylvania. The Starrucca Viaduct, finished in 1848, is an example of Pennsylvania bluestone as a building material. Bluestone is quarried in western New Jersey, Pennsylvania, and eastern New York. It is also quarried in the Canadian Appalachians near Deer Lake in Western Newfoundland. The Pennsylvania Bluestone Association has 105 members, the vast majority of them quarriers.

The other, lesser known, type of American "bluestone" is a blue-tinted limestone abundant in the Shenandoah Valley of Virginia. It is a limestone formed during the Ordovician Period approximately 450 to 500 million years ago, at the bottom of a relatively shallow ocean that covered what is today Rockingham County, Virginia. The limestone that accumulated there was darker in color than most other limestone deposits because it was in deeper waters exposed to less light. The darker blue color resulted in limestone from this region being dubbed "bluestone" and with two sequences measuring about 10,000 feet (3,000 m) thick, it gives the area one of the largest limestone deposits in the world. The stone eventually fades from a deep blue to a light grey after prolonged exposure to sun and rain. Given the abundance of the stone in the Rockingham County area, the first settlers used it as foundations and chimneys for their houses. When James Madison University was built, the local bluestone was used to construct the buildings because of its high quality and cultural heritage.

== See also ==
- Theories about Stonehenge

== Bibliography ==
- Jack, R Lockhart. The Building Stones of South Australia. Bulletin No. 10, Geological Survey of South Australia, Adelaide, 1923.
- John, Brian. The Bluestone Enigma: Stonehenge, Preseli and the Ice Age. Greencroft Books, 2008, page 95. ISBN 978-0-905559-89-6.
- Jones, Nancy. Rooted on Bluestone Hill: A History of James Madison University. Center for American Places, Inc. Santa Fe, NM. 2004.
