= List of hundreds of Wales =

Former land divisions of Wales

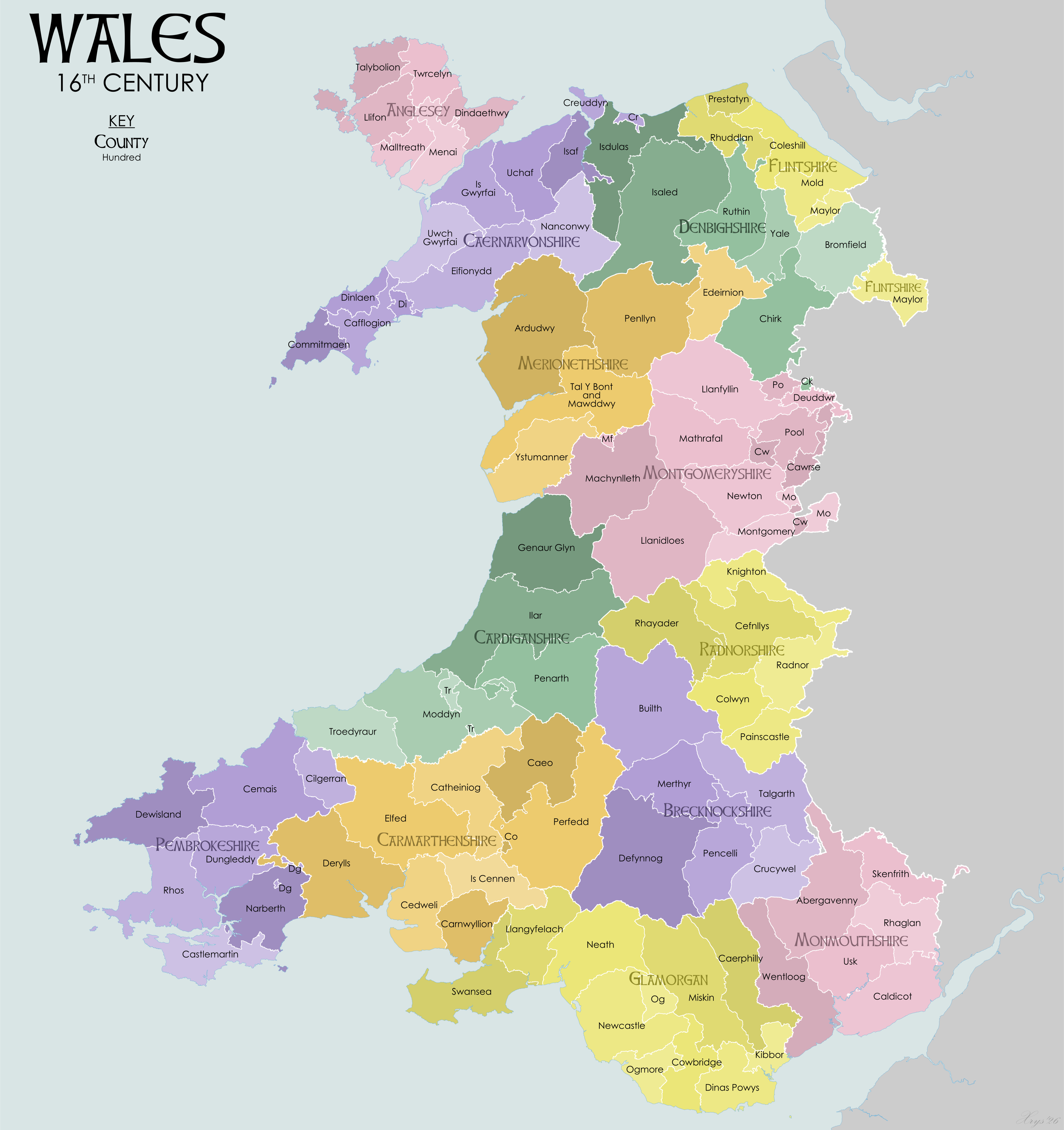
Wales divided into its counties and hundreds in the 16th century

Wales was divided into hundreds following the Laws in Wales Acts 1535 and 1542, using a similar system of hundreds as used in England. This resulted in the creation of five new counties (Monmouthshire, Brecknockshire, Radnorshire, Montgomeryshire and Denbighshire) from the Marches of Wales. Combined with the transformation of the Lordships of Pembroke and Glamorgan into new counties, with the existing counties of Cardiganshire, Caernarfonshire and Flintshire (created by the Statute of Rhuddlan) this gave Wales its thirteen (now historic) counties.

It replaced a medieval Welsh system of division called cantrefi (a hundred farmsteads) which had existed for centuries and was of particular importance in the administration of the Welsh law.

== Anglesey ==
Anglesey was divided into six hundreds:

- Dindaethwy or Tindaethwy or Tyndaethwy
- Llifon or Llyfon
- Malltraeth
- Menai
- Talybolion
- Twrcelyn or Trecelyn

== Brecknockshire ==
Brecknockshire was divided into six hundreds.

- Builth or Buallt
- Crucywel or Crickhowell
- Defynnog or Devynnock or Devynock
- Merthyr or Merthyr-Cynog
- Pencelli or Penkelly or Pencelly
- Talgarth

== Caernarfonshire ==
Caernarfonshire was divided into ten hundreds:

- Commitmaen
- Creuddyn
- Dinlaen
- Eifionydd
- Cafflogion
- Isaf
- Uchaf
- Nanconwy
- Is Gwyrfai
- Uwch Gwyrfai

== Cardiganshire ==
Cardiganshire was divided into five hundreds.

- Genaur Glyn
- Ilar
- Moyddyn
- Penarth
- Troedyraur

=== Parishes ===
Until 1974, under the Local Government Act 1972, Cardiganshire was divided into the following parishes. Chapelries are listed in italics.

Hundred	Parishes
Genaurglyn	Llanbadarn Fawr (Ysbyty Cynfyn) • Llanfihangel Genau'r Glyn • Llangynfelyn
Ilar	Cilcennin • Ciliau Aeron • Henfynyw • Llanafan • Llanbadarn Trefeglwys • Llanddeiniol • Llanddewi Aberarth • Llanfihangel Lledrod • Llanfihangel Rhosddu/Llanfihangel Rhostie • Llanfihangel-y-Creuddyn (Llantrisant) • Llangwyryfon • Llanilar • Llanrhystud • Llansantffraid • Llanwnnws • Llanychaearn • Trefilan • Ysbyty Ystwyth • Ystrad Meurig
Moyddyn	Betws Bledrws • Betws Leucu^{1} • Cellan • Dihewyd • Llanarth (Llanina) • Llanbedr Pont Steffan/Lampeter • Llandysilio Gogo (Capel Cynon) • Llanfair Clydogau • Llanfihangel Ystrad • Llangrannog • Llangybi • Llanllwchaiarn • Llannerchaeron • Llanwenog • Llanwnnen • Silian
Penarth	Llanbadarn Odwyn • Llanddewi Brefi (Blaenpennal • Gartheli) • Llangeitho • Nantgynllo/Nantcwnlle • Tregaron
Troedyraur	Aberporth • Aberteifi/Cardigan • Bangor Teifi • Betws Ifan • Blaenporth • Brongwyn • Henllan • Llandyfriog • Llandygwydd • Llandysul (Capel Dewi • Llandyssulfed • Llanffraed) • Llanfair Orllwyn • Llanfair Treflygen • Llangoedmor (Y Mwnt) • Llangynllo • Llechryd • Penbryn • Tremain • Troedyraur • Verwick/Y Ferwig

^{1}a chapelry to Llanddewi Brefi in Penarth hundred

== Carmarthenshire ==
Carmarthenshire was divided into eight hundreds.

- Carnwyllion
- Catheiniog
- Caeo
- Cedweli
- Derllys
- Elfed
- Is Cennen
- Perfedd

=== Parishes ===
In the medieval period Carmarthenshire was divided into the following parishes:

Hundred	Parishes
Carnwallon	Llanedi; Llanelli (Capel Ifan); Llangennech; Llannon
Cathinog	Brechfa; Llanegwad; Llanfihangel Cilfargen; Llanfihangel Rhos-y-corn; Llanfihangel-ar-Arth (Pencader); Llanfynydd; Llangathen; Llanllwni; Llanybydder (Abergorlech); Pencarreg
Cayo	Cilycwm; Cynwyl Caio; Llanycrwys; Llandeilo (Llandyfan); Llandyfeisant; Llansawel; Llanwrda
Derllys	Carmarthen St Mary; Carmarthen St Peter (Llanllwch); Cilymaenllwyd (Castelldwyran); Cyffig; Eglwyscymyn; Henllan Amgoed (Eglwys Fair y Churig?); Laugharne; Llanboidy (Eglwys Fair Glyn Taf?); Llandawke; Llanddowror; Llandeilo Abercywyn; Llandre Egremont; Llanfihangel Abercywyn; Llangain; Llangan; Llanglydwen; Llangynin; Llangynog; Llansadwrnen; Llansteffan (Llanybri); Llanwinio; Marros; Mydrim; Pendine; St Clears
Elvet	Abergwili (Llanfihangel-uwch-gwili; Llanllawddog; Llanpumsaint); Abernant; Cenarth; Cilrhedyn; Cynwyl Elfed; Llangeler; Merthyr; Newchurch (Llanfihangel Croesfeini); Penboyr; Trelech a'r Betws (Capel Bettws)
Iscennen	Betws; Llanarthne; Llanddarog; Llandybie; Llanfihangel Aberbythych
Kidwelly	Kidwelly; Llandyfaelog; Llangyndeyrn; Llangunnor; Pembrey (Llandyry); St Ishmael (Llansaint)
Perfedd	Llanddeusant; Llandingat; Llanfair ar y Bryn (Ystradffin); Llangadog (Gwynfe); Llansadwrn; Myddfai

== Denbighshire ==
Denbighshire was divided into six hundreds:

- Broomfield
- Chirk
- Is Aled
- Is Dulas
- Ruthin
- Yale

== Flintshire ==
Flintshire was divided into five hundreds:

- Coleshill
- Maylor
- Mold
- Prestatyn
- Rhuddlan

== Glamorgan ==
Glamorgan was divided into ten hundreds:

- Caerphilly
- Cowbridge
- Dinas Powys
- Kibbor
- Llangyfelach
- Miskin
- Neath
- Newcastle
- Ogmore
- Swansea

== Merionethshire ==
Merionethshire was divided into five hundreds:

- Ardudwy
- Edernion
- Ystumanner
- Penilyn
- Tal Y Bon and Mawddwy

== Monmouthshire ==
Monmouthshire was divided into five hundreds:

- Abergavenny
- Caldicot
- Rhaglan
- Skenfrith
- Usk
- Wentloog

== Montgomeryshire ==
Montgomeryshire was divided into eight hundreds:

- Cawrse
- Deuddwr
- Llanfyllin or Llanvyllin
- Machynlleth
- Mathrafal
- Montgomery
- Newtown
- Pool

== Pembrokeshire ==
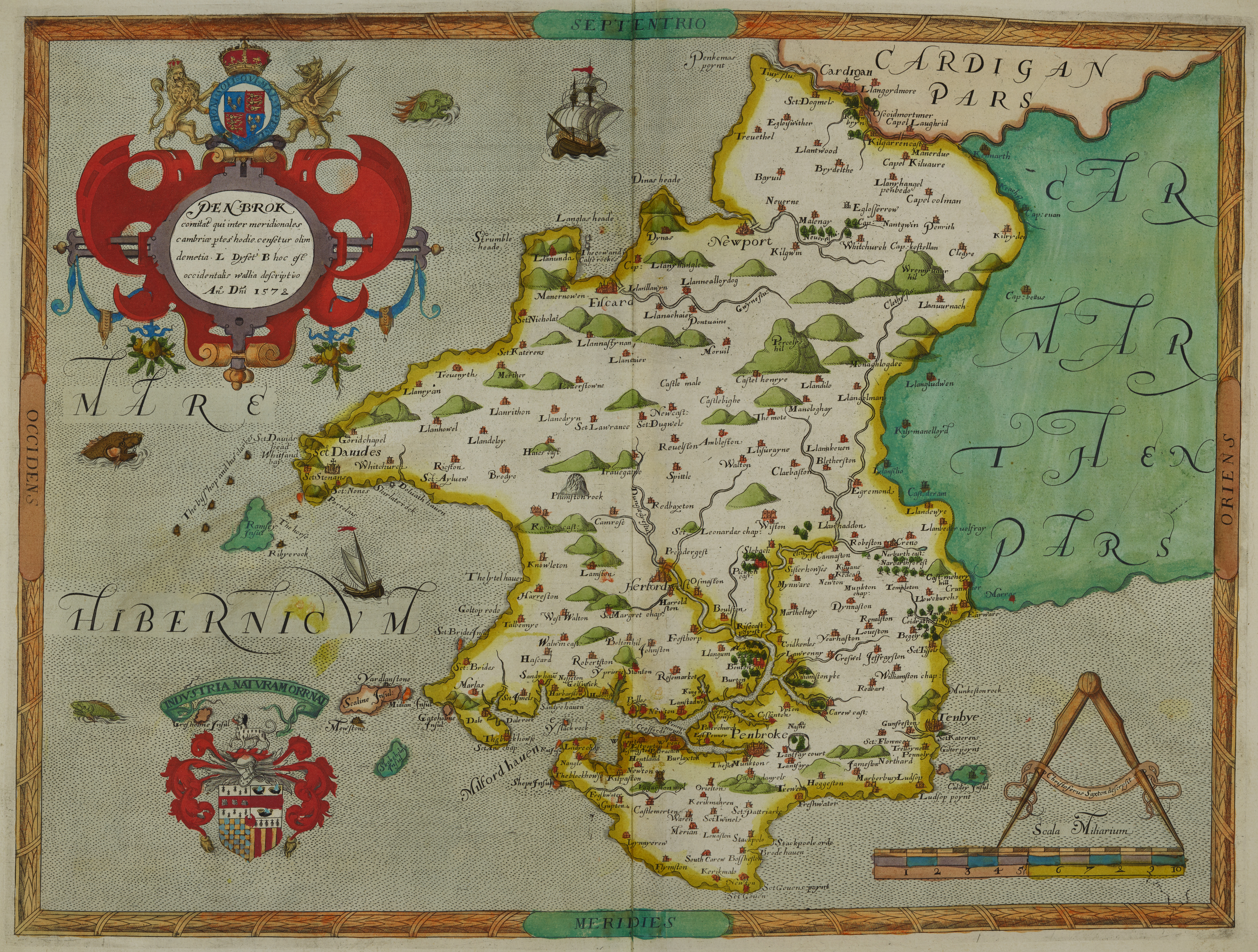
Hand-drawn map of Pembrokeshire by Christopher Saxton from 1577

Pembrokeshire was divided into seven hundreds from the Laws in Wales Act 1535:

- Castlemartin
- Cemais or Cemmaes or Kemmes
- Cilgerran
- Dewisland
- Dungleddy or Daugleddau
- Narberth
- Rhos or Roose or Rhoose

=== Parishes ===
Below is a table of parishes in the medieval period (note: these do not necessarily equate to the pre-1974 civil parishes due to changes in the 19th and 20th centuries). Chapelries are listed in italics.

Hundred	Parishes
Castlemartin	Angle/Angl • Bosherston/Llanfihangel-clogwyn-gofan • Castlemartin/Castell Martin • Cosheston • Dinbych-y-pysgod/Tenby • Hodgeston • Llandyfai/Lamphey • Maenorbŷr/Manorbier • Monkton/Cilmaen • Nash • Penalun/Penally • Penfro/Pembroke St Mary • Penfro/Pembroke St Michael • Pwllcrochan/Poolcroughan • Rhoscrowdder/Rhoscrowther • St Florence/Sain Fflwrens • St Petrox • St Twynnells • Upton • Warren • Y Stagbwll/Stackpole
Cemais / Kemmes	Abergwaun/Fishguard • Beifil/Bayvil • Casmael/Puncheston • Casnewydd-bach/Little Newcastle • Castell-fuwch/Castlebythe • Castell-hendre/Henry's Moat • Dinas/Dinas Cross • Eglwyswen/Whitechurch • Eglwyswrw • Eglwyswythwr/Monington • Llandeilo Llwydarth/Llandilo • Llandudoch/St Dogmaels • Llanfair Nant Gwyn • Llanfyrnach • Llangolman • Llanllawer • Llanwnda • Llanychaer • Llanychlwydog • Maenclochog • Melinau/Meline • Morfil/Morvil • Mynachlogddu • Nanhyfer/Nevern (Cilgwyn) • Newport/Trefdraeth • Pontfaen • Trewyddel/Moylgrove
Cilgerran	Cilgerran • Clydau • Llanfihangel Penbedw • Llantwyd/Llantood • Maenordeifi/Manordeifi (Capel Colman) • Penrhydd/Penrydd (Castellan) • Y Bridell/Bridell
Dewisland	Breudeth/Brawdy • Granston/Treopert • Hayscastle/Caslai • Jordanston/Trefwrdan • Letterston/Treletert • Llandelwy/Llandeloy • Llanedeyrn/St Edrins • Llaneilfyw/St Elvis • Llanfair Nant-y-Gof • Llanhywel/Llanhowel • Llanreithan • Llanrhian • Llanstinan • Maenorowain/Manorowen • Merthyr/Mathry • St Dogwells/Llantydewi • St Lawrence • Tremarchog/St Nicholas • Tyddewi/St Davids • Whitchurch/Tregroes
Deugleddyf/Dungleddy	Ambleston/Treamlod • Bletherston/Trefelen • Boulston • Clarbeston/Treglarbes • Crinow/Crynwedd • Llawhaden • Llanfallteg • Llanycefn • Llys-y-frân • New Moat/Y Mot • Prendergast • Rudbaxton • Slebech/Slebets • Uzmaston • Walton East/Waltwn • Wiston/Cas-wis • Ysbyty/Spittal
Narberth or Arberth	Amroth • Arberth/Narberth • Begeli/Begelly • Caeriw/Carew • Coedcanlas • Cronwern/Crunwere • Gumfreston • Jeffreyston • Lawrenny/Lawrenni • Llanbedr Felfre/Lampeter Velfrey • Llanddewi Felfre/Llanddewi Velfrey • Llandysilio/Llandissilio • Llanusyllt/St Issells • Loveston • Ludchurch • Martletwy • Minwear • Mounton • Newton North • Redberth • Reynalton • Robeston Wathen • Yerbeston
Roose	Burton • Camros/Camrose • Dale • Freystrop • Haroldston St Issells • Haroldston West • Hasguard • Haverford/Hwlffordd St Martin • Haverford/Hwllffordd St Mary • Haverford/Hwlffordd St Thomas • Herbrandston • Hubberston • Johnston • Lambston • Llangwm • Llanudwal/Llanstadwell • Mailrhos/Marloes • Nolton • Robeston West • Roch/Y Garn • Rosemarket/Rhosfarced • St Brides/Sain Ffraid • Llanisan-yn-Rhos/St Ishmaels • Steynton • Talbenny • Trefgarn/Treffgarne • Walton West • Walwyn's Castle/Castell Gwalchmai

== Radnorshire ==
Radnorshire was divided into six hundreds:

- Cefnllys
- Colwyn
- Knighton
- Painscastle
- Radnor
- Rhayader

== Counties, hundreds and parishes in 1849 ==
Parishes remained mostly unchanged from the introduction of canon law in c. 1180-1220 until the major reforms of 1858, 1866 and 1894. Of course, there were some changes during this period, particularly around the time of the Dissolution of the Monasteries when some monastic lands became extra-parochial places and others were absorbed into neighbouring parishes or became new ones. Nevertheless, the situation as reflected in Samuel Lewis's Topographical Dictionary of Wales, 4th ed., 1849, reflects more or less the 'ancient parishes' that had formed the backbone of local administration for six hundred years or so.

Some parishes were divided into chapelries, hamlets or townships, some of which were assessed independently for poor relief and provided separate census returns, thereby executing many of the civil functions of independent parishes. Such 'independently assessed townships' (IATs) are listed in the table below. IATs were officially declared to be civil parishes in their own right by the Poor Law Amendment Act 1866. Extra-parochial places had previously been converted into civil parishes (even though some of them were uninhabited) by the Extra-Parochial Places Act 1858. The patchwork of parishes, chapelries, townships and extra-parochial places was thereby converted into a uniform set of parishes covering the whole country. The situation in 1866 may therefore be inferred from the table below, by adding to the list of ancient parishes all extra-parochial places and all IATs.

County	Hundred (division)	Parishes (IATs)
Anglesey	Jurisdiction of Beaumaris	Llandegfan (Beaumaris IAT only)
Anglesey	Llifon	Bodedern • Bodwrog • Ceirchiog • Holyhead (part) • Llanbeulan (part, including part of Llannerch-y-medd IAT) • Llandrygarn • Llanfaelog • Llanfair-yn-neubwll • Llanfihangel-yn-nhowyn • Llanllibio • Llantrisant (part, including Gwredog IAT) • Llanynghenedl • Llechgynfarwy (including part of Llannerch-y-medd IAT) • Llechylched • Trewalchmai (part)
Anglesey	Malltraeth	Aberffraw • Cerrigceinwen • Heneglwys • Llanbeulan (part) • Llangadwaladr • Llangristiolus • Llangwyfan • Trefdraeth • Tregaian (part) • Trewalchmai (part)
Anglesey	Menai	Llanddaniel-fab • Llanedwen • Llanffinan • Llanfihangel-ysgeifiog • Llangaffo • Llangefni • Llangeinwen • Llangwyllog • Llanidan (including Llanfair-y-cwmwd IAT) • Llantrisant (part) • Newborough • Rhodogeidio (including part of Llannerch-y-medd IAT) • Rhoscolyn • Tregaian (part)
Anglesey	Talybolion	Coedana (part) • Holyhead (part) • Llanbabo • Llanbadrig • Llanddeusant • Llanfachraeth • Llanfaethlu • Llanfair-yng-nghornwy • Llanfechell • Llanfflewyn • Llanfigael • Llanfwrog • Llanrhwydrys • Llanrhyddlad
Anglesey	Twrcelyn	Amlwch (including part of Llannerch-y-medd IAT) • Bodewryd (since c. 1800) • Coedana (part) • Llanallgo • Llanbeulan (part) • Llandyfrydog • Llaneilian • Llaneugrad • Llanfihangel-tre'r-beirdd • Llanwenllwyfo • Penrhos-lligwy • Rhosbeirio
Anglesey	Tyndaethwy	Llanbedr-goch • Llanddona • Llanddyfnan • Llandegfan • Llandysilio • Llanfaes • Llanfair-mathafarn-eithaf • Llanfair-pwllgwyngyll • Llanfihangel-din-sylwy • Llangoed • Llaniestyn • Llansadwrn • Penmon • Penmynydd • Pentraeth • Puffin Island (extra-parochial) • Tregaian (part)
Brecknockshire		Fenni-fach, Llanddew, Llanddewi-abergwesyn, Llanddewi'r-cwm, Llandyfaelog-fach, Llandyfaelog-tre'r-graig, Llandeilo'r-fan, Llandefalle, Llandulas, Llanelieu, Llanfihangel-abergwesyn, Llanfihangel-bryn-pabuan, Llanfihangel-fechan, Llanfihangel-nant-bran, Llanfihangel-talyllyn, Llanfillo, Llanfrynach, Llanganten, Llangasty-talyllyn, Llangenny, Llangorse, Llangynog, Llanhamlach, Llansantffraed, Llanspyddid, Llanwrthwl, Llanynis, Llanywern, Llyswen, Maesmynis, Modrydd, Patrishow, Penbuallt, Penderyn, Penpont, Rhosferig, Talachddu, Trallong, Treflys, Ystradfellte
Brecknockshire	Borough of Brecon	Brecon Castle (extra-parochial) • Brecon St John the Evangelist (including Brecon St Mary IAT) • Christ's College (extra-parochial) • Llanfaes^{4} (part)
Brecknockshire	Builth	Alltmawr • Builth • Llanafan-fawr (including Llysdinam IAT) • Llanafan-fechan (including part of Gwarafog IAT) • Llanlleonfel (including part of Gwarafog IAT) • Llanwrtyd
Brecknockshire	Crickhowell	Crickhowell • Llanbedr-ystrad-yw • Llanelly • Llanfihangel-cwmdu • Llangattock • Llangynidr
Brecknockshire	Defynnog	Defynnog (comprising Cray, Glyn, Glyntawe, Maescar and Senny IATs) • Llanfaes^{4} (part) • Llywel (comprising Isclydach, Traianglas and Traianmawr IATs) • Ystradgynlais (comprising Higher and Lower IATs)
Brecknockshire	Merthyr-cynog	Aberyscir • Battle • Garthbrengi (part) • Merthyr-cynog
Brecknockshire	Pencelly	Cantref • Garthbrengi (part) • Llanddetty • Llanfaes^{4} (part) • Llanfeigan • Vaynor
Brecknockshire	Talgarth	Aberllynfi^{1} • Bronllys • Cathedine • Crickadarn • Glasbury (Pipton and Tregoed and Felindre IATs only) • Gwenddwr (including Trawscoed IAT) • Hay • Llanigon (including Glynbach IAT) • Talgarth (including Grwyne-fawr and Grwyne-fechan IATs)
Cardiganshire		Caron-is-clawdd, Isandre, Llancynfelyn, Llanddeiniol, Llanddewi-aberarth, Llandygwydd, Llandyssul, Llanerchaeron, Llanfair-clydogau, Llanfair-orllwyn, Llanfair-treflygen, Llanfihangel-ystrad, Llangeitho, Llangoedmore, Llangranog, Llangunllo, Llangwyryfon, Llangybi, Llanilar, Llanio, Llanllwchaiarn, Llansantffraid, Llanwenog, Llanwnen, Llanychaiarn, Llechryd, Lledrod Lower, Lledrod Upper, Melindwr, Mount, Nantcwnlle, Parcel-canol, Penbryn, Prysg and Carfan, Rhostie, Silian, Tirymynach, Trefeirig, Trefilan, Troedyraur, Uchandre, Vaenor Lower, Vaenor Upper, Verwick, Ysgubor-y-coed, Yspytty-ystwyth, Ystrad-meurig
Cardiganshire	Geneu'r Glyn	Llanbadarn-fawr (Aberystwyth, Broncastellan, Clarach, Cwmrheidol and Elerch IATs only) • Llanfihangel-geneu'r-glyn (including Ceulan-a-maesmawr, Cyfoeth-y-brenin, Cynnull-mawr and Henllys IATs)
Cardiganshire	Ilar	Cilcennin • Ciliau-aeron (part) • Henfynyw • Llanafan • Llanbadarn-fawr (Llanbadarn-y-creuddyn Lower and Llanbadarn-y-creuddyn Upper IATs only) • Llanbadarn-trefeglwys • Llanfihangel-y-creuddyn (comprising Lower and Upper IATs) • Llanrhystud (including Haminiog and Mefenydd IATs) • Llanwnws (comprising Gwnnws Lower and Gwnnws Upper IATs) • Tregaron (part of Caron-uwch-clawdd IAT only)
Cardiganshire	Moyddyn	Betws-bledrws • Cellan • Dihewyd (part) • Lampeter (part) • Llanarth • Llanddewi-brefi (Betws-lleucu IAT only) • Llandysilio-gogo • Llanina (including Cydplwyf IAT)
Cardiganshire	Penarth	Llanbadarn-odwyn • Llanddewi-brefi (Blaenpenal, Deutu-camddwr, Deutu-pysgotwr, Garth and Ystrad, Gartheli, Gogoyan, Gorwydd and Gwynfil IATs only) • Tregaron (part, including part of Caron-uwch-clawdd IAT)
Cardiganshire	Troedyraur	Aberporth • Bangor-teifi • Betws-ifan • Blaenporth • Brongwyn • Cardigan • Cardigan Island (extra-parochial) • Ciliau-aeron (part) • Dihewyd (part) • Henllan • Lampeter (part) • Llandyfriog
Carmarthenshire		, Llanboidy, Llandawke, Llanddowror, Llandilo-abercowin, Llandissilio East, Llandyfeisant, Llanfair-ar-y-bryn, Llanfihangel-aberbythych, Llanfihangel-abercowin, Llanfihangel-ar-arth, Llanfihangel-cilfargen, Llanfihangel-rhosycorn, Llanfynydd, Llangain, Llangan East, Llangathen, Llangeler, Llangennech, Llanglydwen, Llangunnor, Llangynin, Llangynog, Llanllawddog, Llanllwni, Llanpumsaint, Llansadwrn, Llansindurnen, Llanstephan, Llanwinio, Llanwrda, Llanybyther, Loughor Borough, Marros, Meidrim, Merthyr, Myddfai, Newchurch, Pembrey, Penboyr, Pencarreg, Pendine, Talley, Trelech-a'r-betws
Carmarthenshire	Borough of Carmarthen	Carmarthen
Carmarthenshire	Carnawllon	Llanedi • Llanelli • Llannon
Carmarthenshire	Cathinog	Brechfa • Llanegwad (part) • Llanycrwys
Carmarthenshire	Cayo	Cilycwm • Cynwyl-gaeo • Llandeilo-fawr (part) • Llansawel
Carmarthenshire	Derllys	Cilymaenllwyd (part, including Castelldwyran IAT) • Cyffig • Eglwyscummin • Egremont • Henllan-amgoed (including Eglwys-fair-a-churig IAT) • Laugharne (comprising Parish and Town IATs) • St Clears
Carmarthenshire	Elvet	Abergwili • Abernant • Cenarth • Cilrhedyn (part) • Cynwyl-elfed
Carmarthenshire	Iscennen	Bettws • Llanarthney • Llanddarog • Llandeilo-fawr (part) • Llandybie •
Carmarthenshire	Borough of Kidwelly	Kidwelly (St Mary Within IAT only)
Carmarthenshire	Kidwelly	Cloigin (extra-parochial)^{3} • Kidwelly (St Mary Without IAT only) • Llandyfaelog • Llangyndeyrn • St Ishmael
Carmarthenshire	Perveth	Llanddeusant • Llandingat • Llangadog
Carnarvonshire		Llanaelhaiarn, , , Llanddeinolen, Llandegwning, Llandudno, Llandudwen, Llandwrog, Llanengan, Llanfaelrhys, Llanfaglan, Llanfairfechan, Llanfair-is-gaer, Llanfihangel-bachellaeth, Llanfihangel-y-pennant, Llangelynin, Llangian, Llangwnadl, Llangwstennin, Llangybi, Llaniestyn, Llanllechid, Llanllyfni, Llannor, Llanrhychwyn, Llanrug, Llanwnda, Llanystumdwy, Llysfaen, Maenan, Meyllteyrn, Nevin, Penllech, Penmachno, Penmorfa, Penrhos, Pistyll, Rhiw, The Abbey, Treflys, Trefriw,Tydweiliog, Ynyscynhaiarn.
Carnarvonshire	Borough of Carnarvon	Llanbeblig (part)
Carnarvonshire	Commitmaen	Aberdaron • Bodferin • Bryncroes (part) •
Carnarvonshire	Creuddyn	Eglwysrhos • Llandrillo-yn-rhos (Eirias IAT only)
Carnarvonshire	Dinllaen	Abererch (part) • Bardsey Island (extra-parochial) • Boduan • Ceidio • Edern
Carnarvonshire	Eifionnydd	Abererch (part) • Beddgelert (part) • Criccieth • Dolbenmaen • Llanarmon •
Carnarvonshire	Gafflogion	Bottwnog • Bryncroes (part) • Carnguwch • Denio • Llanbedrog •
Carnarvonshire	Isgorvai	Bangor • Beddgelert (part) • Betws-garmon • Llanbeblig (part) • Llanberis •
Carnarvonshire	Llechwedd-isaf	Caerhun • Conwy • Eglwysbach (Maenan IAT only) • Gyffin • Llanbedr-y-cennin (including Dolgarrog IAT)
Carnarvonshire	Llechwedd-uchaf	Aber • Dwygyfylchi • Llandygai
Carnarvonshire	Nant-conway	Betws-y-coed • Dolwyddelan • Llanrwst (Trewydir IAT only) • Ysbyty-ifan (Eidda IAT only)
Carnarvonshire	Uchgorvai	Clynnog
Denbighshire		, Llanddoget, Llanddulas, Llandegla, Llandrillo-yn-rhos, Llandyrnog, Llanelian-yn-rhos, Llanelidan, Llanfair-dyffryn-clwyd, Llanferras, Llanfihangel-glyn-myfyr, Llanfwrog, Llangadwaladr, Llangedwyn, Llangerniew, Llangollen-traian, Llangwm, Llangwyfan, Llangynhafal, Llannefydd, Llanrhaiadr-yn-mochnant (north), Llanrhydd, , Llansannan, Llansantffraid-glan-conway, , Llansilin, Llantysilio, Llanychan, Llanynys, Llay, Marchwiel, Minera, Nantglyn, Pennant (part), Pentrevoelas, Ruthin, St Asaph (part), Stansty, Tir-ifan, Tre-brys
Denbighshire	Bromfield	Bangor-is-y-coed (Eyton, Pickhill, Ryton and Sesswick IATs only) • Erbistock (part) • Gresford (Borras-riffre, Burton, Erddig, Erlas, Gwersyllt and parts of Allington and Marford and Hoseley IATs only) • Holt (Cacca Dutton, Dutton Diffieth, Dutton-y-bran, Ridley and Sutton IATs only) • Ruabon • Wrexham (Abenbury-fawr, Acton, Bieston, Bersham, Borras-hovah, Broughton, Brymbo, Esclusham Above, Esclusham Below, Gourton, Wrexham Abbott and Wrexham Regis IATs only)
Denbighshire	Chirk	Chirk • Llanarmon-dyffryn-ceiriog • Llanarmon-mynydd-mawr • Llangollen (including Glyntraian IAT) • Llansantffraid-glyn-ceiriog • Llanymynech (Careghofa IAT only (until 1844))^{2}
Denbighshire	Borough of Denbigh	Denbigh
Denbighshire	Isaled	Cerrigydrudion • Gwernihowel (extra-parochial) • Gwytherin • Henllan • Llanrhaeadr-yng-nghinmeirch
Denbighshire	Isdulas	Abergele • Betws-yn-rhos • Eglwysbach (part) • Llanfair-talhaiarn • Llanrwst (part) • St Asaph (part) • St George
Denbighshire	Ruthin	Bodfari (Aberwheeler IAT only) • Clocaenog • Cyffylliog • Derwen • Efenechtyd • Llanbedr-dyffryn-clwyd • Llanynys (part)
Denbighshire	Yale	Bryneglwys • Llanarmon-yn-ial (part) • St Asaph (part)
Flintshire		Meliden, Mold, Nannerch, Nerquis, Newmarket, Overton, Penley, Rhuddlan, St Asaph, Threapwood (part), Tremeirchion, Tryddyn, Whitford, Worthenbury, Ysceifiog
Flintshire	Coleshill	Cilcain • Flint • Halkyn • Holywell • Northop
Flintshire	Maelor	Bangor-is-y-coed (Bangor-is-y-coed IAT only) • Dodleston (Higher Kinnerton IAT only)^{2} • Erbistock (part) • Gresford (parts of Allington and Marford and Hoseley IATs only) • Hanmer (including Bettisfield, Bronington, Halghton, Tybroughton and Willington IATs) • Hope • Llanarmon-yn-ial (part) • Malpas (Iscoyd IAT only)^{2} • Wrexham (Abenbury-fechan IAT only)
Flintshire	Mold	Hawarden (including Saltney IAT)
Flintshire	Prestatyn	Dyserth (part) • Gwaenysgor • Llanasa •
Flintshire	Rhuddlan	Bodfari (part) • Caerwys • Cwm • Dyserth (part) • St Asaph (part)
Flintshire	Borough of Rhuddlan	Dyserth (part)
Glamorganshire		Gowerton, , Llanblethian, Llancarfan, Llandaff, Llandeilo-talybont, Llanddewi, Llandeyrn, Llandough (Llanfair), Llandough (Penarth), Llandow, Llandyfodwg, Llangan, Llangeinor, Llangennith, Llanharan, Llanharry, Llanilid, Llanilterne, Llanishen, Llanmadoc, Llanmaes, Llanmihangel, Llanrhidian Higher, Llanrhidian Lower, Llansamlet Higher, Llansamlet Lower, Llansannor, Llantrithyd, Llanvedw, Llanvythin, Llysworney, Marcross, Mawr, Merthyr-dovan, Merthyr-mawr, Michaelston-le-Pit, Michaelston-super-Ely, Monknash, Nash, Newcastle Higher, Newcastle Lower, Newton Nottage, Nicholaston, Oxwich, Oystermouth, Penarth, Penderry, Pendoylan, Penlline, Penmaen, Pennard, Penrice, Pentyrch, Peterston-super-Ely, Port Eynon, Porthkerry, Pyle, Radyr, Reynoldston, Rhigos, Rhossili, Rhyd-y-gwern, Rhyndwclydach, Roath, Rudry, Rumney, St Mary Church, St Mary Hill, St Lythans, St Mellons, St Nicholas, Sker, Stembridge, Sully, Swansea Higher and Lower, Swansea St Thomas, Swansea Town and Franchise, Tythegston Higher, Tythegston Lower, Van, Wenvoe, Whitchurch, Wick, Ynysawdre, Ystradowen
Glamorganshire	Caerphilly	Eglwysilan • Gelligaer • Llanfabon • Merthyr-tydfil (part)
Glamorganshire	Jurisdiction of Cardiff	Cardiff St John • Cardiff St Mary
Glamorganshire	Cowbridge	Eglwys-brewis • Flemingston • Gileston • Llantwit Major • St Athan • St Hilary • Welsh St Donats
Glamorganshire	Borough of Cowbridge	Cowbridge
Glamorganshire	Dinas Powis	Barry • Bonvilston • Cadoxton-juxta-Barry • Caemain (extra-parochial)^{3} • Cogan • Highlight (extra-parochial) • Lavernock • Leckwith • Penmark • St Andrews Major • St-Brides-super-Ely • St Fagans • St George's-super-Ely
Glamorganshire	Kibbor	Caerau • Lisvane •
Glamorganshire	Llangyfelach	Llangiwg • Llangyfelach (part of Clase IAT)
Glamorganshire	Borough of Merthyr Tydfil	Merthyr-tydfil (part)
Glamorganshire	Miskin	Aberdare • Llantrisant • Llantwit-fardre • Llanwonno • Ystradyfodwg
Glamorganshire	Neath	Aberavon • Baglan (comprising Higher and Lower IATs) • Briton Ferry • Cadoxton-juxta-Neath (comprising Blaenhonddan, Coedffranc, Dulais Higher, Dulais Lower, Dyffryn-clydach, Neath, Neath Lower, Neath Middle, Neath Upper and Ynys-y-mond IATs) • Cilybebyll • Glyncorrwg (including Blaengwrach IAT) • Llantwit-juxta-Neath (including Clyne and Resolven IATs) • Michaelston-super-Avon (comprising Higher and Lower IATs)
Glamorganshire	Newcastle	Bettws • Coity (comprising Higher and Lower IATs) • Coychurch (comprising Higher, Lower, Pencoed and Peterston-super-montem IATs) • Kenfig • Laleston • Llangynwyd (comprising Cwmdu, Higher, Lower and Middle IATs) • Margam • Newcastle • St Brides Minor (part)
Glamorganshire	Ogmore	Colwinston • Ewenny • St Andrews Minor • St Brides Major • St Brides Minor (part) • St Donats
Glamorganshire	Swansea	Bishopston • Cheriton • Ilston • Knelston • St John's-juxta-Swansea •
Glamorganshire	Borough of Swansea	Llangyfelach (part of Clase IAT)
Merionethshire		, Llandderfel, Llandecwyn, Llandrillo, Llanegryn, Llanelltyd, Llanenddwyn, Llanfachreth, Llanfair, Llanfihangel-y-pennant, Llanfihangel-y-traethau, Llanfrothen, Llangar, Llangelynin, Llangower, Llansantffraid-glyn-dyfrdwy, Llanuwchllyn, Llanycil, Llanymawddwy, Maentwrog, Pennal, Talyllyn, Trawsfynydd
Merionethshire	Ardudwy	Beddgelert (part) • Ffestiniog • Llanaber • Llanbedr • Llandanwg • Llanddwywe (comprising Is-y-graig and Uwch-y-graig IATs) •
Merionethshire	Edeirnion	Betws-gwerfil-goch • Corwen • Gwyddelwern
Merionethshire	Estimaner	Tywyn
Merionethshire	Penllyn	Llanfor • Llanycil
Merionethshire	Talybont and Mawddwy	Dolgellau • Llangelynin • Mallwyd (part)
Monmouthshire		Abergavenny, Aberystruth, Bedwas, Bedwellty, Bettws, Bettws-newydd, Bishton, Bryngwyn, Bwlch-trewyn (from 1844), Caerleon, Caerwent, Caldicot, Chapel Hill, Chepstow, Christchurch, Clytha, Coedkernew, Cwmcarvan, Cwmyoy Lower, Cwmyoy Upper, Dingestow, Dinham, Dixton Newton, Duffryn, Glascoed, Goldcliff, Goytre, Graig, Grosmont, Gwehelog, Gwernesney, Henllys, Howick, Ifton, Itton, Kemeys Commander, Kemeys Inferior, Kilgwrrwg, Llanarth, Llanbadoc, Llanddewi-fach, Llanddewi-rhydderch, Llanddewi-skirrid, Llandegveth, Llandenny, Llandevenny, Llandogo, Llanellen, Llanfoist, Llanfrechfa Lower, Llanfrechfa Upper, Llangattock-juxta-caerleon, Llangattock-lingoed, Llangattock-nigh-Usk, Llangattock-vibon-avel, Llangeview, Llangoven, Llangstone, Llangua, Llangwm-isaf, Llangwm-uchaf, Llangybi, Llanhennock, Llanhilleth, Llanishen, Llanllowell, Llanmartin, Llanover, Llansaintfraed, Llansoy, Llantilio-crossenny, Llantilio-pertholey, Llantrisant, Llanvaches, Llanvair-discoed, Llanvair-kilgeddin, Llanvapley, Llanvetherine, Llanvihangel-crucorney, Llanvihangel-llantarnam, Llanvihangel-nigh-Usk, Llanvihangel-pontymoel, Llanvihangel-rogiet, Llanvihangel-tor-y-mynydd, Llanvihangel-ystern-llewern, Llanwenarth-citra, Llanwenarth-ultra, Llanwern, Machen Lower, Machen Upper, Magor, Malpas, Mamhilad, Marshfield, Mathern, Michaelston-y-vedw, Mitchel Troy, Monkswood, Monmouth, Mounton, Mynyddislwyn, Nash, Newchurch East, Newchurch West, Newport, Newport St Woollos, Oldcastle, Panteg, Parc Grace Dieu, Penallt, Penhow, Penrhos, Penterry, Pen-y-clawdd, Peterstone Wentloog, Portskewett, Raglan, Redwick, Risca, Rockfield, Rogerstone, Rogiet, St Arvans, St Arvans Grange, St Brides Netherwent, St Brides Wentloog, St Kingsmark, St Maughans, St Pierre and Runstone, Shirenewton, Skenfreth, Tintern Parva, Tredunnock, Tregare, Trellech Grange, Trelleck, Trelleck Town, Trevethin with Pontypool, Trostrey, Undy, Usk, Welsh Bicknor (until 1844), Whitson, Wilcrick, Wolvesnewton, Wonastow
Montgomeryshire		Llanbrynmair, Llandinam, Llandrinio, Llandysilio, Llanerfyl, Llanfair-caereinion, Llanfechain, Llanfihangel-yng-ngwynfa, Llanfyllin, Llangadfan, Llangurig, Llangyniew, Llangynog, Llanllugan, Llanllwchaiarn, Llanmerewig, Llanrhaiadr-yn-mochnant (south), Llanwddyn, Llanwyddelan, Llanymynech (Careghofa IAT only (from 1844))^{2}, Manafon, Meifod, Middletown, , Montgomery, Newtown, Pennant (part), Penstrowed, Rhosgoch, Snead (part)^{2}, Tregynon, Trelystan, Uppington,
Montgomeryshire	Cawrse	Alberbury (Criggion IAT only)^{2} • Berriew (part) • Castle Caereinion (part) • Churchstoke (part)^{2} • Forden • Worthen (Leighton IAT only)^{2}
Montgomeryshire	Deythur	Alberbury (Bausley IAT only)^{2} • Llansantffraid-ym-mechan (Llansantffraid-deuddwr IAT)
Montgomeryshire	Llanfyllin	Hirnant
Montgomeryshire	Llanidloes	Carno • Llanidloes • Llanwnnog • Trefeglwys
Montgomeryshire	Machynlleth	Cemmaes • Darowen • Llanwrin • Machynlleth (including Isygarreg and Uwchygarreg IATs) • Penegoes •
Montgomeryshire	Mathrafal	Castle Caereinion (part) • Garthbeibio • Mallwyd (Caereinion-fechan IAT only)
Montgomeryshire	Montgomery	Churchstoke (part)^{2} • Hyssington (part)^{2} • Kerry • Lydham (Aston IAT only)^{2} • Mainstone (Castlewright IAT only)^{2} • Mochdre
Montgomeryshire	Newtown	Aberhafesp • Berriew (part) • Bettws-cedewain • Llandyssil
Montgomeryshire	Pool	Buttington (Trewern IAT only) • Guilsfield • Llansantffraid-ym-mechan (Llansantffraid-pool IAT)
Montgomeryshire	Liberties of Welshpool	Buttington (Cletterwood and Hope IATs only) • Castle Caereinion (part) • Welshpool (comprising Cyfronydd, Pool Lower, Pool Middle and Pool Upper IATs)
Pembrokeshire		Cilrhedyn (part), Furzy Park and Portfield, Little Newcastle, Llandeloy, Llandilo, Llandissilio West, Llanfair-nant-gwyn, Llanfair-nant-y-gof, Llanfallteg East, Llanfallteg West, Llanfihangel-penbedw, Llanfrynach, Llangan West, Llangolman, Llangwm, Llanhowell, Llanllawer, Llanreithan, Llanrhian, Llanstadwell, Llanstinan, Llantood, Llanwnda, Llanycefn, Llanychaer, Llanychlwydog, , Llysyfran, Loveston, Ludchurch, Maenclochog, Manorbier, Manorowen, Marloes, Martletwy, Mathry, Meline, Minweer, Monington, Monkton, Morvil, Mounton, Moylgrove, Mynachlogddu, Narberth North, Narberth South, Nash, New Moat, Newport, Newton North, Nolton, Pembroke St Mary, Pembroke St Michael, Penally, Pontfaen, Puncheston, Pwllcrochan, Redberth, Reynalton, Rhoscrowther, Robeston Wathen, Robeston West, Roch, Rosemarket, Rudbaxton, St Nicholas, St Petrox, St Twynnells, Skokholm Island, Slebach, Smalls Rock Lighthouse, South Bishop Rock Lighthouse, Spittal, Stackpole Elidor, Steynton, Talbenny, Tenby St Mary In Liberty, Tenby St Mary Out Liberty, Treffgarne, Tremain, Upton, Vorlan, Walton East, Walton West, Walwyns Castle, Warren, Whitechurch, Whitechurch, Wiston, Yerbeston
Pembrokeshire	Castlemartin	Angle • Bosherston • Caldey Island (extra-parochial)^{3} • Castlemartin • Cosheston • Hodgeston • Lamphey • St Florence
Pembrokeshire	Cemmaes	Bayvil • Bridell (part) • Castlebythe • Dinas • Eglwyswrw • Fishguard • Henry's Moat • Nevern • St Dogmaels
Pembrokeshire	Daugleddau	Ambleston • Bletherston • Boulston • Cilymaenllwyd (Grondre and part of Castelldwyran IATs only) • Clarbeston • Crinow • Llanddewi-velfrey (part) • Llawhaden •
Pembrokeshire	Dewisland	Brawdy • Cathedral Close of St Davids (extra-parochial) • Granston • Hayscastle • Jordanston • Letterston • St Davids • St Dogwells • St Ederns • St Elvis • St Lawrence •
Pembrokeshire	Borough of Haverfordwest	Haverfordwest St Martin (part) • Haverfordwest St Mary • Haverfordwest St Thomas (part) • Poorfield (extra-parochial)^{3} • Prendergast (part) • Uzmaston (part)
Pembrokeshire	Kilgerran	Bridell (part) • Capel-colman • Cilgerran • Cilrhedyn (part) • Clydau • Manordeifi • Penrydd (including Castellan IAT)
Pembrokeshire	Narberth	Amroth • Begelly (including East Williamston IAT) • Carew • Coedcanlas • Crunwere • Gumfreston • Jeffreyston • Lampeter-velfrey • Lawrenny • St Issells •
Pembrokeshire	Roose	Burton • Camrose • Dale • Freystrop • Grassholm Island (extra-parochial) • Haroldston St Issells • Haroldston West • Hasguard • Haverfordwest St Martin (part) • Haverfordwest St Thomas (part) • Herbrandston • Hubberston • Johnston • Lambston • St Brides • St Ishmaels •
Radnorshire		, Llanddewi-fach, Llanddewi-ystradenny, Llandeilo-graban, Llandrindod, Llanelwedd, Llanfaredd, Llanfihangel-helygen, Llanfihangel-rhydithon, Llangunllo, Llansaintfraed-in-Elvel, Llanstephan, , Llowes, Michaelchurch-on-Arrow, New Radnor, Newchurch, Norton, Pilleth, Rhayader, Rhulen, Stanage, Trewern and Gwailtha, Walton and Womaston, Whitton
Radnorshire	Cefnllys	Abbey-cwm-hir (part) • Bleddfa (part) • Cefnllys • Llanbadarn-fawr • Llandegley
Radnorshire	Colwyn	Aberedw • Betws-disserth • Cregrina • Disserth • Glascwm (including Trewern IAT) • Llanbadarn-y-garreg •
Radnorshire	Knighton	Abbey-cwm-hir (part) • Beguildy • Bleddfa (part) • Heyope • Knighton • Llananno (part) • Llanbadarn-fynydd • Llanbister •
Radnorshire	Liberties of New Radnor	Cascob (part)^{2} • Llanfihangel-nant-melan (including part of Harpton and Wolfpits IAT) • Old Radnor (including Ednol, Evenjobb, Kinnerton, Salford and Badland, Old Radnor and Burlingjobb and part of Harpton and Wolfpits IATs)
Radnorshire	Painscastle	Boughrood • Bryngwyn • Clyro • Glasbury (part) • Llanbedr-painscastle •
Radnorshire	Borough of Presteigne	Presteigne (including Discoed and Litton and Cascob IATs)
Radnorshire	Radnor	Gladestry • Glascwm (Colva IAT only)
Radnorshire	Rhayader	Llananno (part) • Llansantffraed-cwmdeuddwr • Llanyre • Nantmel • St Harmon

^{1}reduced to a hamlet (but not made part of any other parish) when the church fell into disrepair during the 18th century

^{2}part of this parish is in England

^{3}due to its small size this extra-parochial place was not created a parish in 1858 but was merged into neighbouring parishes

^{4}also known as Brecon St David

== See also ==
- List of hundreds of England
