= Pen-y-wenallt =

Hamlet in Ceredigion, Wales

Coordinates: 52.047°N 4.499°W

- Location within Ceredigion
- OS grid reference: SN282415
- Community: Beulah
- Principal area: Ceredigion
- Preserved county: Dyfed
- Country: Wales
- Sovereign state: United Kingdom
- Post town: Newcastle Emlyn
- Postcode district: SY23
- Police: Dyfed-Powys
- Fire: Mid and West Wales
- Ambulance: Welsh
- UK Parliament: Ceredigion Preseli

Pen-y-wenallt is a hamlet in Ceredigion (formerly Cardiganshire), Wales. Pen-y-wenallt lies halfway between Cenarth and Pont Ceri, bordering on Carmarthenshire, and is a constituent of the Parish of Llandygwydd. The River Teifi (or Afon Teifi) flows along its southern border.

Pen-y-wenallt was the home of the seventeenth century theologian, Theophilus Evans.
