= Cemais =

Cemais may refer to the following medieval divisions in Wales:

- Cemais (Dyfed)
- Cemais (Anglesey)

== See also ==
- Cemaes, a village on Anglesey
- Kemeys Commander, a village in Monmouthshire
