= Newton North =

Newton North may refer to:

- Newton North, Pembrokeshire, Wales, UK
- Newton North High School, Mass., USA
