= Theophilus Evans =

Welsh historian

Theophilus Evans (February 1693 – 11 September 1767) was a Welsh clergyman and historian. He was the fifth son of Charles Evans of Pen-y-wenallt, near Newcastle Emlyn, in Carmarthenshire, and Elinor Beynon of nearby Llangoedmor, in Cardiganshire, both in West Wales. In 1728, Evans married Alice Bevan from Gelligaled, Glamorganshire, with whom they had five children, three sons and two daughters, the elder of whom was the mother of historian Theophilus Jones.

== Clerical life ==
Evans was born in the family home in Pen-y-wenallt, 'the descendant of a Carmarthenshire family of minor gentry, characterized by strong royalist and Anglican loyalties.' He was christened in the church of Saint Tygwydd in Llandygwydd, Cardiganshire in 1693. He was ordained a deacon in 1718 and a priest in 1719, by Adam Ottley, the Bishop of St Davids. He then became the curate for Tyr yr abad after which he became the curate for Llanlleonvel, which was part of the hundred of Builth in Brecknockshire, and then became the domestic chaplain for the adjoining village of Garth. In 1727 Evans became the private chaplain of Marmaduke Gwynne, Sackville's heir, but they eventually parted because of Gwynne's support for Howell Harris and the Methodist cause. In 1728 his bishop offered him the small rectory of Llanynis, which he held for ten years, after which he resigned. In 1738 he became the rector of Llangammarch and in the following year, he also obtained a post at Saint David’s Church in Llanfaes, Brecon, and held both posts until he died.

== Publications ==
In 1715 Evans might have had published Llwybr hyffordd y plentyn bach i fywyd tragwyddol. In 1716 he definitely had published his book, Drych y Prif Oesoedd (A mirror of ancient times), which has been described as 'a brief chronicle or history of the Britons' and an 'entertaining version of the early history of Wales', which Jones (1909) claimed 'has been more read and more admired by the inhabitants of South Wales than any other ever published in the language ...'. In 1739 Evans had published Pwyll y Pader, 'an exposition of the Lord's prayer in several sermons, which he dedicated to Sackville Gwynne, Esq., of Glanbrân', near Llandovery. In 1752 Evans had his A history of the modern enthusiasm published in which he treated 'sectaries of all descriptions with great severity, but quotes their own authors and instances their own leaders, for what he conceives, their most objectionable principles and their worst actions'.

== Death ==
Evans died on September 11, 1767, leaving his small estate and his many books and papers to Theophilus Jones, his grandson, who had spent much of his boyhood with him. He was buried in the churchyard, 'near the stile, entering from the east.' Jones paid him the following tribute:

'He had perhaps as much of the milk of human kindness, as any man who ever lived: of the value of money he knew little, books were his only treasures, and employed the greatest part of that time in which he was not engaged in the duties of his holy function, and in this character he was remarkably eminent.'
