= List of hundreds of England and Wales =

List of hundreds of England and Wales may refer to:

- List of hundreds of England
- List of hundreds of Wales
