= Henllys =

Henllys could refer to a number of places in Wales.

- Henllys, Carmarthenshire a hamlet on the west bank of the River Tywi in the parish of Cilycwm
- Henllys, Ceredigion a township in the parish of Llanfihangel Genau'r Glyn or Llandre
- Henllys, Conwy a small place to the west of Llanfair Talhaiarn
- Henllys, Gwynedd a hamlet near Llanbedrog
- Henllys, Monmouthshire in the parish of Tregare
- Henllys, Pembrokeshire in the parish of Nevern (including Castell Henllys)
- Henllys, Powys a small place near the parish of Manafon to the south of Llanfair Caereinion
- Henllys, Swansea a small place to the west of Llanddewi
- Henllys, Torfaen formerly a village and parish historically in, which became a suburb and community of the new town of Cwmbran in the 1980s
- Henllys Vale, a hamlet just to the south of Cwmbran in Torfaen
- Henllys-fawr, a small place to the north of Aberffraw on the Isle of Anglesey
