= Llanfwrog =

Llanfwrog may refer to:

- Llanfwrog, Anglesey
- Llanfwrog, Denbighshire
