= Rhyd-Meirionnydd =

Village in Ceredigion, Wales

Coordinates: 52.457081°N 4.060902°W

- Location within Ceredigion
- OS grid reference: SN 6006 8634
  - Cardiff: 77.3 mi (124.4 km)
  - London: 179.7 mi (289.2 km)
- Community: Genau'r-glyn
- Principal area: Ceredigion
- Country: Wales
- Sovereign state: United Kingdom
- Post town: Borth
- Postcode district: SY24
- Police: Dyfed-Powys
- Fire: Mid and West Wales
- Ambulance: Welsh
- UK Parliament: Ceredigion Preseli
- Senedd Cymru – Welsh Parliament: Ceredigion Penfro

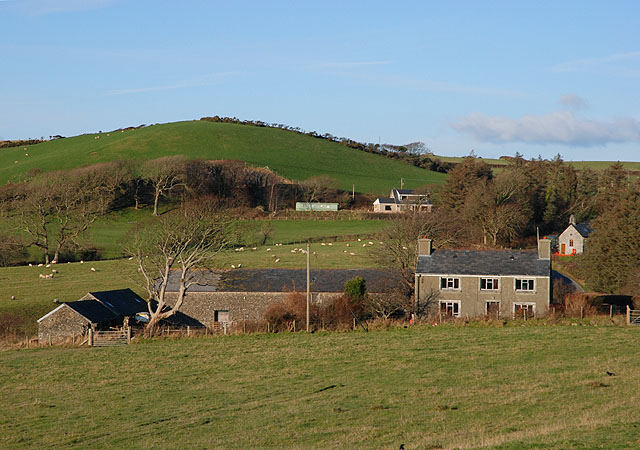
Rhyd-meirionydd farm

Rhyd-Meirionnydd (also spelled as Rhyd-meirionydd or Rhyd Meirionnydd) is a small village in the community of Genau'r-glyn, Ceredigion, Wales, which is 77.3 miles (124.3 km) from Cardiff and 179.7 miles (289.2 km) from London. Rhyd-Meirionnydd is represented in the Senedd by Elin Jones (Plaid Cymru) and is part of the Ceredigion Preseli constituency in the House of Commons.

== See also ==
- List of localities in Wales by population
