= Coedcanlas =

Village and parish in Pembrokeshire, Wales

Coordinates: 51.74°N 4.89°W

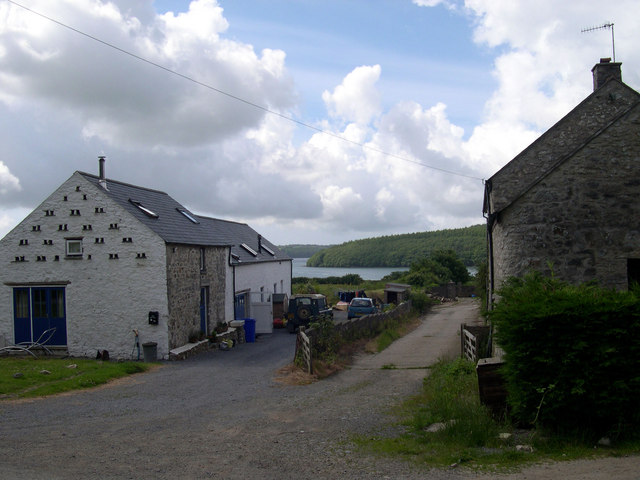
- Coedcanlas farm cottages, 2009

- Location within Pembrokeshire
- OS grid reference: SN008088
- Community: Martletwy
- Principal area: Pembrokeshire
- Country: Wales
- Sovereign state: United Kingdom
- Police: Dyfed-Powys
- Fire: Mid and West Wales
- Ambulance: Welsh
- UK Parliament: Preseli Pembrokeshire
- Senedd Cymru – Welsh Parliament: Preseli Pembrokeshire

Coedcanlas is a small parish in Pembrokeshire, Wales, on the eastern shore of the Daugleddau estuary, 5 miles (8.0 km) north of Pembroke, in the Pembrokeshire Coast National Park, Wales, United Kingdom. Together with the parishes of Martletwy, Minwear, Newton North and Lawrenny, it constitutes the community of Martletwy.

== Name ==
The placename is a Welsh placename and means "Cynlas's wood", Cynlas being a Welsh personal name. It appears on a 1578 map as "Coidkenles", presumably an English phonetic rendition.

== History ==
The parish church of St Mary, which may have had pre-Conquest origins, was "in decay" in the 17th century, was rebuilt in the 18th century, and is now a ruin again. The parish had an area of 341 hectares (840 acres).

The village was once important for export of limestone, which was quarried extensively, but today it consists only of a few farms. Coedcanlas farmhouse was once a minor gentry country house. It is a Grade II Listed building and the remnants of its, once large, garden are listed at Grade II on the Cadw/ICOMOS Register of Parks and Gardens of Special Historic Interest in Wales.

In the 1840s, the parish had 169 inhabitants. Its census populations were: 152 (1801): 167 (1851): 85 (1901): 69 (1951): 32 (1981). The percentage of Welsh speakers was 11 (1891): 3 (1931): 0 (1971). Part of Little England beyond Wales, it has been essentially English-speaking for 900 years.
