= Morgan Jones (cricketer) =

Welsh cricketer (1829–1905)

Personal information
- Full name: Morgan Jones
- Born: 20 December 1829; Llandygwydd, Cardiganshire, Wales
- Died: 2 June 1905 (aged 75); Llanmiloe, Carmarthenshire, Wales
- Batting: Unknown
- Bowling: Unknown

Domestic team information
- Years: Team
- 1849–1850: Oxford University

Morgan Jones DL (20 December 1829 – 2 June 1905) was a Welsh cricketer.

The son of The Reverend John Jones, he was born in December 1829 at Llandygwydd, Cardiganshire. He was educated at Harrow School, matriculating at University College, Oxford in 1848. While studying at Oxford, he played for Oxford University on two occasions against Cambridge University in The University Matches of 1849 and 1850. In the 1850 fixture, he claimed a five wicket haul with six wickets in the Cambridge first-innings. Jones later served as a deputy lieutenant of Pembrokeshire in 1852 and of Cardiganshire in 1853. He served as High Sheriff of Cardiganshire in 1854. Jones died in June 1905 at Llanmiloe, Carmarthenshire.
