= Duhonw =

Community in Powys, Wales

Coordinates: 52.119°N 3.436°W

- Community
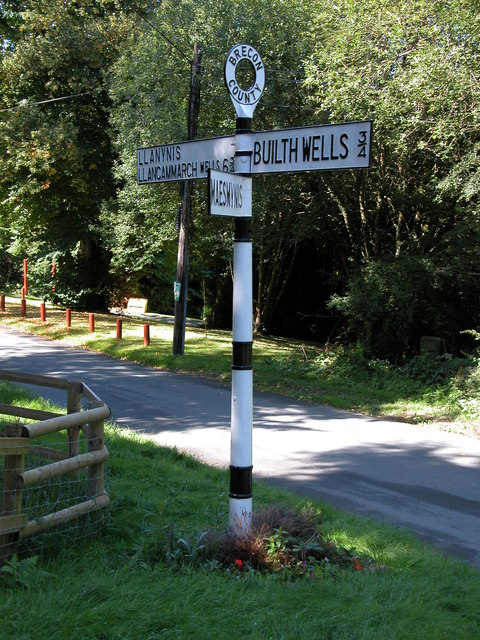
- Old Brecon County signpost
- Principal area: Powys
- Country: Wales
- Sovereign state: United Kingdom
- Police: Dyfed-Powys
- Fire: Mid and West Wales
- Ambulance: Welsh
- List of places UK Wales Powys Map of the community

Duhonw is a rural community in Powys, Wales, to the south of Builth Wells (Welsh: Llanfair ym Muallt), in the historic county of Breconshire. Covering an area of 4,376 hectares (10,810 acres) and including scattered farms and dwellings, it is bordered to the north by the Afon Irfon, to the south by Mynydd Epynt and Banc y Celyn, at 472 metres (1,549 ft), and to the east by the rivers Duhonw and Wye (Afon Gwy). Llangammarch Wells (Welsh: Llangamarch) lies to the west.

According to the 2011 census, the population was 294, a 2% decrease from the 300 people recorded in 2001. The 2011 census showed that 14.6% of the population could speak Welsh, an increase from 9.2% in 2001.

Duhonw Community Council was created following a 1985 review by the Local Government Boundary Commission for Wales, amalgamating the four small communities of Llanddewi'r Cwm, Llangynog, Llanynis and Maesmynis.

Duhonw is part of the UK Ministry of Defence's Sennybridge Training Area, and is listed as a Site of Special Scientific Interest.

== See also ==
- Buellt

== See also ==
- List of Sites of Special Scientific Interest in Brecknock
