= Tŷ-llwyd =

Mansion in Ceredigion, Wales

Coordinates: 52.105607°N 4.504214°W

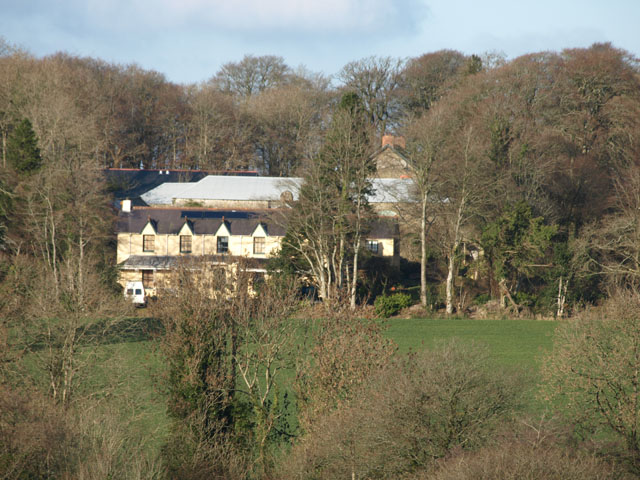

- Location within Ceredigion
- OS grid reference: SN 2859 4821
  - Cardiff: 71.4 mi (114.9 km)
  - London: 191.4 mi (308.0 km)
- Community: Beulah
- Principal area: Ceredigion
- Country: Wales
- Sovereign state: United Kingdom
- Post town: Cardigan
- Postcode district: SA43
- Police: Dyfed-Powys
- Fire: Mid and West Wales
- Ambulance: Welsh
- UK Parliament: Ceredigion Preseli
- Senedd Cymru – Welsh Parliament: Ceredigion Penfro

Tŷ-llwyd is an old mansion and estate in the community of Beulah, Ceredigion, Wales, which is 71.4 miles (114.8 km) from Cardiff and 191.4 miles (308.1 km) from London.

Tŷ-llwyd mansion is an 18th-century building with a home farm and a number of outbuildings. It once formed the centre of a small country estate. Much of the land has been sold off and the house is now a guesthouse.

== See also ==
- List of localities in Wales by population
