= Y Cross Cas-lai =

Coordinates: 51.8862°N 5.0345°W

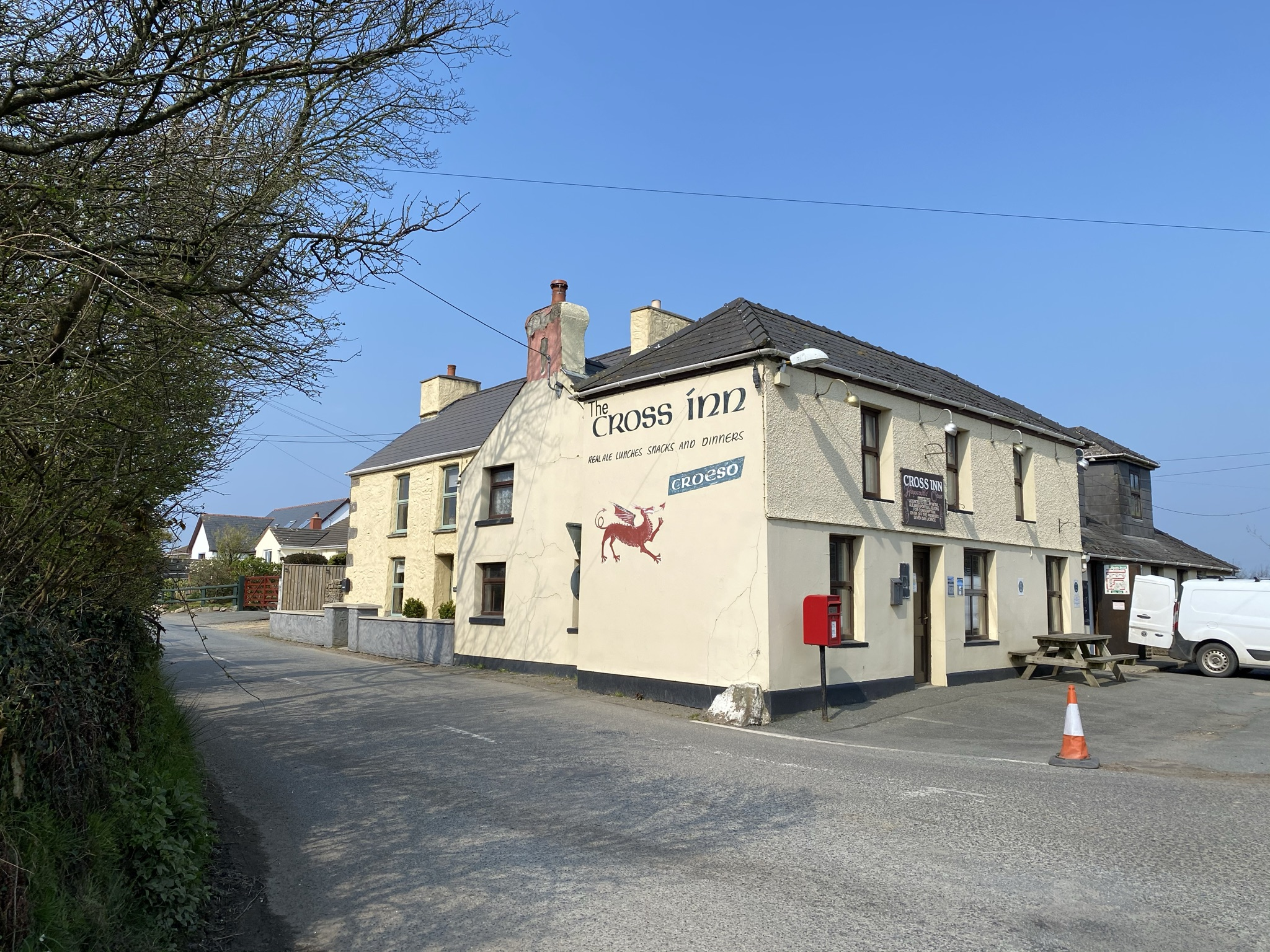
Exterior view in 2021

Y Cross Cas-lai (English: The Cross Inn) is a community-owned pub in Hayscastle Cross (Welsh: Cas-lai), Pembrokeshire, Wales.

As The Cross Inn, it was owned by the Phillips family for 160 years, and is the only pub in an isolated area. After the owning family decided to sell and were unable to find buyers, it was bought by a community group in 2023, and rebranded using the Welsh-language form of the name.
