= Cynog ap Brychan =

Coordinates: 52.025327°N 3.480438°W

Saint Cynog or Canog of Wales
- Born: c. 434 AD; Wales
- Died: 5th century AD; Wales
- Cause of death: martyrdom
- Venerated in: Catholic Church Eastern Orthodox church
- Feast: 7 October
- Attributes: A young man with gingery hair, a Celtic tonsure and a torc holding a palm
- Patronage: Kilmacanogue, County Wicklow

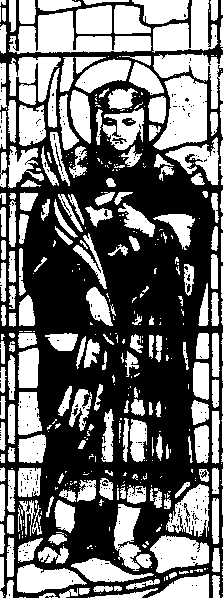
Drawing of a church stained-glass window depicting Saint Cynog.

Cynog ap Brychan (Welsh: Cynog ap Brychan; born c. 434), also known as Saint Cynog or Canog (Old Welsh: Kennauc), was an early Welsh saint and martyr. His shrine is at Merthyr Cynog in Wales and his feast day is observed on 7 or 9 October. In Ireland he is known as St. Mocheanog.

== Life ==
Cynog was reportedly the son of St. Brychan, a powerful Welsh prince of the British Dark Ages, and Benadulved, daughter of Benadyl, a prince of Powys, whom Brychan seduced while a hostage at the court of her father.

As a young man he enjoyed hunting. He later became a hermit priest and a travelling missionary who founded various churches in Wales, Ireland and Brittany before settling back in Wales as a hermit. St. Cynog by his prayers is said to have banished a tribe of giant cannibals or ormests who lived in the mountains and terrorised a local community in Wales. He was also a cheerful doer of the humblest tasks which earned him the enmity of some jealous monks.

He was murdered on the mountain called the Van (Bannau Brycheiniog) while living with a community of hermits who became jealous of his holiness and resentful of his admonitions against their slothfulness. He was regarded as a martyr and his relics are housed at Merthyr Cynog.

== Cynog's torc relic ==
In 1191, Gerald of Wales wrote that there still existed a certain relic purported to be a royal torc that had once been worn by Cynog, presumably as an item of royal regalia. Gerald encountered this relic while travelling through Brycheiniog. He wrote of this relic:

Moreover I must not be silent concerning the collar which they call St. Canauc's; for it is most like to gold in weight, nature, and colour; it is in four pieces wrought round, joined together artificially, and clefted as it were in the middle, with a dog's head, the teeth standing outward; it is esteemed by the inhabitants so powerful a relic, that no man dares swear falsely when it is laid before him: it bears the marks of some severe blows, as if made with an iron hammer; for a certain man, as it is said, endeavouring to break the collar for the sake of the gold, experienced the divine vengeance, was deprived of his eyesight, and lingered the remainder of his days in darkness.

— Gerald of Wales, The Itinerary of Archbishop Baldwin through Wales, Chapter II

Though not easy to interpret, this detailed description points, in the opinion of Sir T. D. Kendrick, to its probably being Welsh or Irish work of the Viking period, i.e. the 10th or the 11th century.

== Veneration ==
He is chiefly commemorated in Brycheiniog, where Defynnog, Ystradgynlais, Penderyn, Battle, Llangynog, and Merthyr Cynog, are all named after him, the last being reputed his place of burial.

== Veneration in Ireland ==
Saint Cynog is believed to have spent time in Ireland where he was known as Mochonog or Mocheanog (literally meaning mo-chean-og - 'my young Canoc'). He founded an ancient church at Kilmacanogue in County Wicklow. Some sources claim that he was a disciple of St. Patrick and that he baptised the children of Lir. A national school in Bray has been named in his honour According to tradition his brother was St. Mochorog or Mo-Goroc who was also active in Wicklow and founded churches at Kilmacurragh, Delgany and Enniskerry.
