= Marmaduke Gwynne =

Welsh squire and Methodist convert

Marmaduke Gwynne (1691–1769) was a Welsh squire, and an early and influential Methodist convert. He was a scion of the Gwynne family of Glanbrân near Llandovery. Gwynne married well and employed Theophilus Evans as an Anglican private chaplain. He was converted to Methodism by Howell Harris. He served as a legal adviser and financial supporter to the Methodists and his daughter Sarah married Charles Wesley.

== Life ==
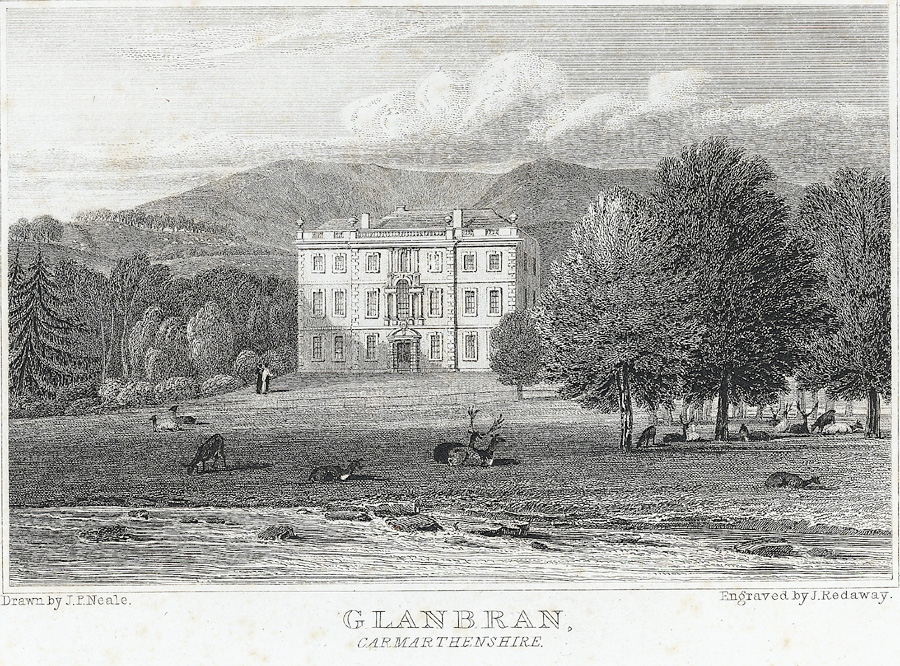
Glanbran, Carmarthenshire. This house was built by Marmaduke's brother Roderick Gwynne

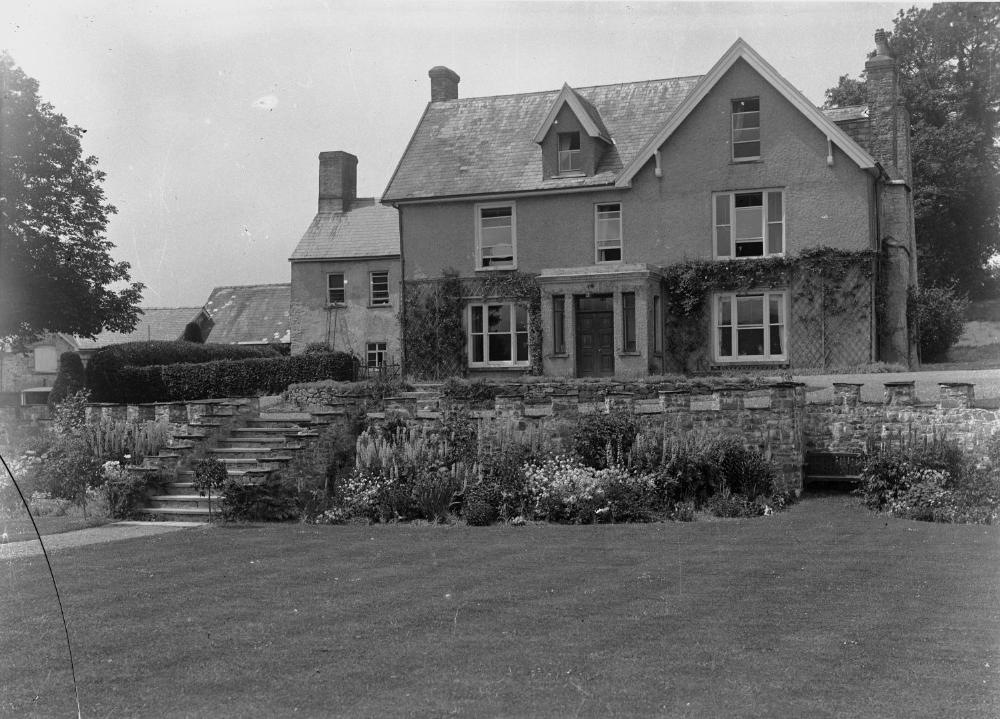
Garth House. Gwynne's home and the house where Charles Wesley courted Sally Gwynne

Gwynne was born in Llanafan Fawr, Breconshire, to Howell and Mary (née Gwynne) Gwynne; his parents both had the surname Gwynne, but were not closely related. He was baptised on 1 January 1692. He was the eldest of seven children and his name was the same as his maternal grandfather who had built up the family fortune in a life of public service driven by self-interest. His grandfather had lost his position as a judge in Anglesey due to allegations of corruption and Jacobitism.

Gwynne attended Jesus College, Oxford before joining Gray's Inn in 1711. He seemed to get his interest in the law from his namesake and his interest in religion from his father and Sackville Gwynne who was the squire at Glanbrân near Llandovery.

By the time Gwynne had reached his majority he had returned from London to take up a substantial inheritance of Garth and Llanelwedd from his grandfather (as his father had died in 1708). When Gwynne married Sarah Evans of Peterwell at Lampeter it was a combination of two fortunes as Evans brought a lump sum of £30,000 and her own income of £600 for year. Gwynne became a magistrate and High Sheriff of Radnorshire in 1718.

In 1726 Sarah, Gwynne's fifth child (of nine) was born. Gwynne became a firm friend of the clergyman Theophilus Evans and from 1727 Evans was employed as a private chaplain at the Gwynne residence in Garth where he would preach sometimes more than once a day.

== Conversion ==
Gwynne was converted to Calvinistic Methodism and became an active supporter of the evangelist Howell Harris in 1737. The family story is that Gwynne went to listen to Harris in the role of an investigating magistrate. He took along a copy of the Riot Act, the reading of which was a necessary preliminary to dispersing an assembly thought contrary to public order, but with the need to presume innocence he first listened to one of his sermons. Gwynne was an immediate convert and invited Harris back to his house to eat that evening. When Gwynne returned his wife refused to eat with the stranger. His eleven-year-old daughter, Sally (baptised Sarah), was intrigued but Theophilus Evans was completely unimpressed and within two years he had moved away from his erstwhile benefactor.

In 1738 Gwynne was offering Harris the use of valuable books in Welsh and he was seen as amongst the first members of the gentry in Wales to openly declare their support for this religious revolution. Meanwhile, only his daughter shared his spiritual confidence in his household.

Harris was arrested in January 1741 when it was claimed that he and his followers had broken into a celebration by force of arms and then one of Harris's men had then assaulted a Justice of the Peace when he had arrived to arrest him. When the case came to court, Harris refused a lawyer and this obliged Gwynne to appear on his behalf. However, when Harris walked from the court he was seized by a mob intent on murder. Gwynne and his brother, Roderick Gwynne of Glanbrân, were able to avert a lynching. Gwynne was able to use his skill and influence to avoid a custodial sentence, but Harris had to take a fine for a reduced charge of "behaving in a riotous manner".

Gwynne spent more and more time on his religious beliefs and continued to correspond with Harris. Despite his wife's objections he made his house welcome to passing travellers of similar beliefs including the ministers Edward Godwin, George Whitefield, Benjamin Dutton (and his wife, Ann Dutton). Ann Dutton was to become an influential Baptist writer. His house guests also included John and Charles Wesley. The Gwynne family had twenty servants who looked after them and a minimum of ten house guests and frequently more.

Gwynne attended the 1745 Methodist conference in Bristol and he was the only non-preacher at the conference. On 8 April 1749 his daughter, Sarah, married Charles Wesley at Llanllywenfel parish church near Garth, Powys. Sarah had met Charles two years before and it was said to be "love at first sight" and a rare happy marriage in the Wesley family. Sarah's mother is said to have brought a sixth share of £30,000 and £600 per year to the marriage whereas Charles had to get his brother to underwrite a potential income of £100 per year from book sales to reassure Sarah's family.

Gwynne's enthusiasm for the Wesleys cooled his relationship with Harris. Gwynne eventually stepped back from his active support for Methodism but he remained on good terms with the Wesleys and Howell Harris. Gwynne lived in Ludlow for several years after 1745 but then returned to Breconshire.

Marmaduke Gwynne died in 1769, aged 77, and was buried at Llanlleonfel parish church near the Garth estate. He had six daughters and three sons Howell, Roderick and Marmaduke. In time it was the descendants of his second son Marmaduke (who died in 1782) who inherited the family's wealth and lived at Llanelwedd Hall until the early 20th century.

Honorary titles
Preceded by John Miles	High Sheriff of Radnorshire; 1718	Succeeded by Hugh Powell
