= Beulah, Ceredigion =

Village and community in Ceredigion, Wales

Beulah
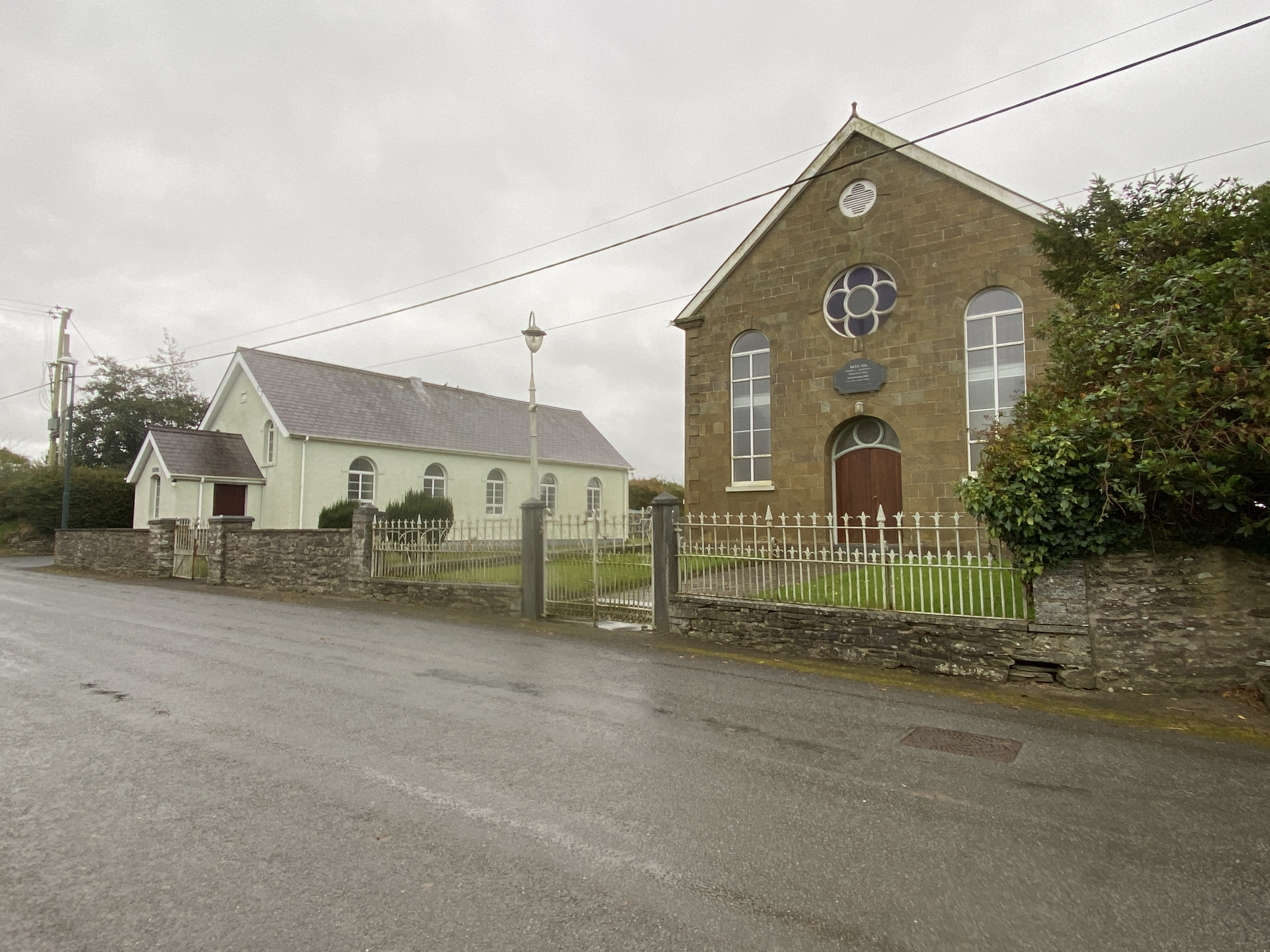

- Location within Ceredigion
- Population: 1,627 (2011)
- OS grid reference: SN289461
  - Cardiff: 90 mi (140 km)SE
- Principal area: Ceredigion
- Preserved county: Dyfed
- Country: Wales
- Sovereign state: United Kingdom
- Post town: NEWCASTLE EMLYN
- Postcode district: SA38
- Post town: CARDIGAN
- Postcode district: SA43
- Dialling code: 01239
- Police: Dyfed-Powys
- Fire: Mid and West Wales
- Ambulance: Welsh
- UK Parliament: Ceredigion Preseli
- Senedd Cymru – Welsh Parliament: Ceredigion Penfro
- List of places UK Wales Ceredigion 52.087312°N 4.501063°W Community map: Map of the community

Beulah is a small village, wider community and electoral ward located halfway between the market town of Newcastle Emlyn and the seaside resort of Aberporth in Ceredigion, Wales.

The wider community area of Beulah also covers the villages of Llandygwydd, Betws Ifan, Brongwyn, Tŷ-llwyd, Cwm-cou and the larger part of Cenarth, which it shares with Carmarthenshire across the River Teifi.

== Governance ==
The Beulah electoral ward's population was 1,617 in 2001, increasing slightly to 1,627 at the 2011 Census. The ward is coterminous with the community and elects one county councillor to Ceredigion County Council. Prior to 1995 it was a ward for Dyfed County Council and included the neighbouring communities of Troedyraur and Llangoedmor.

== Attractions ==
The area's attractions include Cenarth Falls waterfalls on the Teifi and Felin Geri watermill in Ceri Valley.
