= Hayscastle =

Village, parish and community in Pembrokeshire, Wales

Hayscastle: Welsh: Cas-lai/Castellhaidd
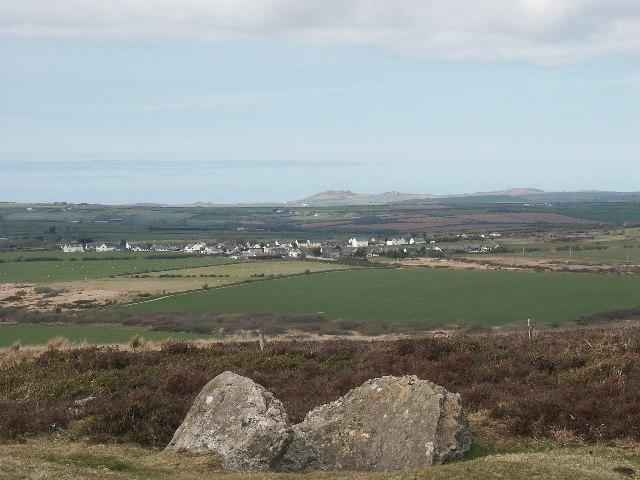

- Location within Pembrokeshire
- Population: 465 (2011)
- Principal area: Pembrokeshire
- Country: Wales
- Sovereign state: United Kingdom
- Post town: Haverfordwest
- Postcode district: SA62
- Police: Dyfed-Powys
- Fire: Mid and West Wales
- Ambulance: Welsh
- UK Parliament: Preseli Pembrokeshire
- List of places UK Wales Pembrokeshire 51.886261°N 5.034736°W Map of the community

Hayscastle, or Hays-Castle (Welsh: Cas-lai or Castellhaidd), is a village, parish and community of Pembrokeshire in West Wales, 7½ miles (N. W. by N.) from Haverfordwest on the B4330 road.

== History ==
Richard Fenton, in his 1810 Historical Tour, identified what he believed to be the remains of a Roman villa near Ford.

Hays Castle Motte is the site of a former Norman castle. It stood on a mound, oval in plan, which still stands around 20 feet (6.1 m) high on one side.

Hayscastle was in the union of Haverfordwest, in the Hundred of Dewisland. There were 366 inhabitants in 1841. The large rural parish is recorded as having been for the greater part inclosed and in a good state of cultivation. The largest village is Haycastle Cross; Haycastle itself to the northwest is no larger than a hamlet; the parish includes the settlements of Brimaston and Ford, the latter being in the extreme east of the parish.

In 1870–72, John Marius Wilson's Imperial Gazetteer of England and Wales recorded a parish population of 297 and 62 houses in an area of 4,462 acres (1,806 ha).

RAF Hayscastle Cross Chain Home early warning radar installation was situated here during the Second World War.

== Worship ==
The parish church is dedicated to St. Mary. The church is of medieval origin, but little remains from that period except the 13th-century font. Repairs were made to the church by D. F. Ingleton in 1927–8. In the small village of Ford in the parish there is a chapel of ease.

There are places of worship for Independents and Calvinistic Methodists and two or three Sunday schools which were supported by the dissenters. Noddfa Newton Chapel was built in 1862 and rebuilt in 1924. It is described as having an "old-fashioned stone gable front with a centre arch and arched windows." Several tumuli were formerly discernible, but they have been nearly levelled.

== Amenities and events ==
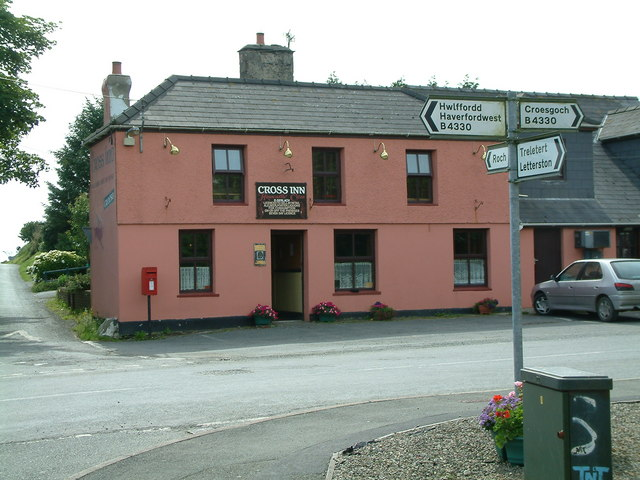
Y Cross pub at Hayscastle Cross

The village has a History and Environment Society, Women's Institute, Neighbourhood Watch and Young Farmers' Club. The Y Cross inn stands in the centre of the village and had been run for 160 years by the same family. It was announced in July 2023 that the inn, which had been on the market for two years, had attracted a community grant of £200,000 from the UK government to allow it to be bought by the community.

Since 1954, the Hayscastle Show, an horticultural show, has been held each August. In 1969, a separate committee was formed to organise pony classes which are now also a feature of the show.

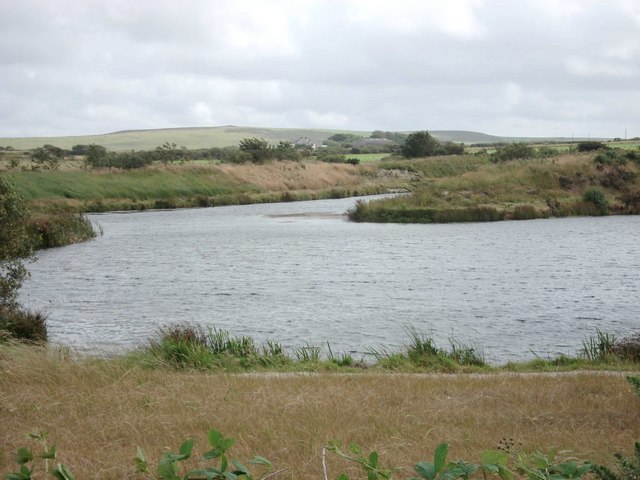
Hayscastle fishery

Hayscastle fishery with a small lake lies between the villages of Hayscastle Cross and Hayscastle.
