= Dihewyd =

Village in Ceredigion, Wales

Coordinates: 52.181°N 4.216°W

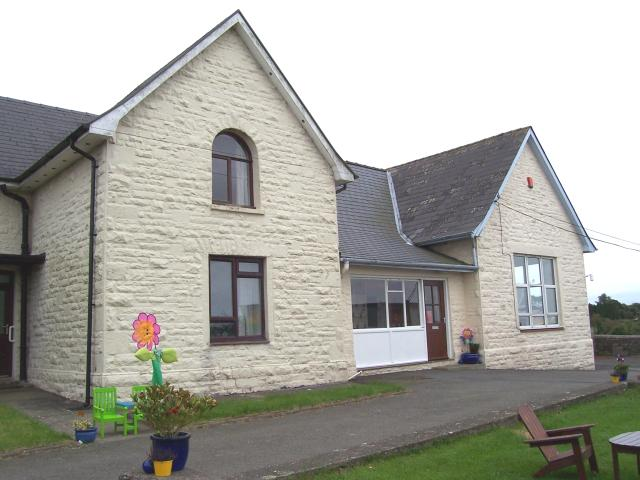
Dihewyd Primary School, on the B4342 in Dihewyd.

Dihewyd is a village and parish in the county of Ceredigion, West Wales with a population of about 200 people. It is 5 miles (8 km) from Aberaeron and 8 miles (13 km) (northwest by west) from Lampeter. This parish is situated near the Vale of Aeron and not far from the river Mydur. There is also a primary school in the village called Ysgol Gynradd Dihewyd which currently has about 30 pupils attending. Dihewyd no longer has a local shop, pub or post office - the nearest being three miles away at Ystrad Aeron and it only has one bus service (Bwcabus on Wednesdays) to the nearby harbour town of Aberaeron as well as a school bus taking pupils to Ysgol Gyfun Aberaeron. It does have a public telephone box (but it has had the phone removed) and, since October 2015, is connected to fibre broadband. It also has a chapel, church and village hall.

Treberfedd is known as the highest point of Dihewyd as well as the highest point of central Ceredigion.

Despite not having a local shop since 1989, the local primary school now has a Siop Sied open to the public. A shop inside a shed at the side of the school that trusts the members of the public to go into it and buy things without anyone actually managing the shop, people only supply it with things like eggs, fruit, vegetables etc.
