= Llanddewi'r Cwm =

Village in Powys, Wales

Coordinates: 52.127°N 3.412°W

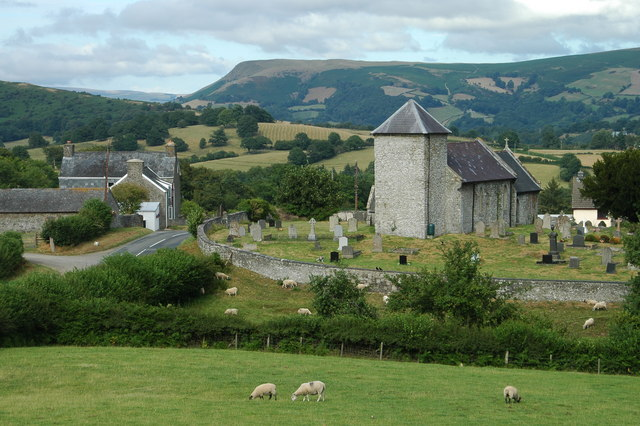

- Location within Powys
- Community: Duhonw
- Principal area: Powys
- Preserved county: Powys
- Country: Wales
- Sovereign state: United Kingdom
- Police: Dyfed-Powys
- Fire: Mid and West Wales
- Ambulance: Welsh
- UK Parliament: Brecon, Radnor and Cwm Tawe
- Senedd Cymru – Welsh Parliament: Brecon and Radnorshire

Llanddewi'r Cwm (also spelt Llanddewi'r-cwm) is a village and former community in Powys, Wales. In 1985 it was made part of the newly-formed community of Duhonw.

Its church, dedicated to St David, is known to have existed as early as 1183.
