= Menai =

Menai may refer to:

== Places ==
=== Australia ===
- Menai, New South Wales

=== Africa ===
- Menai Bay on the island of Zanzibar, Tanzania
- Menai Island, a Cosmoledo atoll islet, Seychelles

=== Europe ===
- Menai, an electoral ward in Bangor, Wales, UK
- Menai (Caernarfon ward) in Wales, UK
- The Menai Strait in North Wales, UK
  - The Menai Suspension Bridge across the strait
  - Coleg Menai, Bangor (near the bridge)
  - Menai Bridge (Welsh: Porthaethwy), a town near the bridge
- Mineo (Ancient Greek: Μεναί, romanized: Menai), Italy

== Other uses ==
- Operation Menai Bridge, the codename for plans surrounding the death of King Charles III
