= Perfedd Hundred =

Hundred of Carmarthenshire, Wales

Coordinates: 51.905°N 3.781°W

Perfedd was a hundred, a geographic division, in the traditional county of Carmarthenshire, Wales. Its name derives from the Latin word permedium meaning "inner part".
