= Llanfwrog, Anglesey =

Village in Anglesey, Wales

Coordinates: 53.325278°N 4.551944°W

Llanfwrog
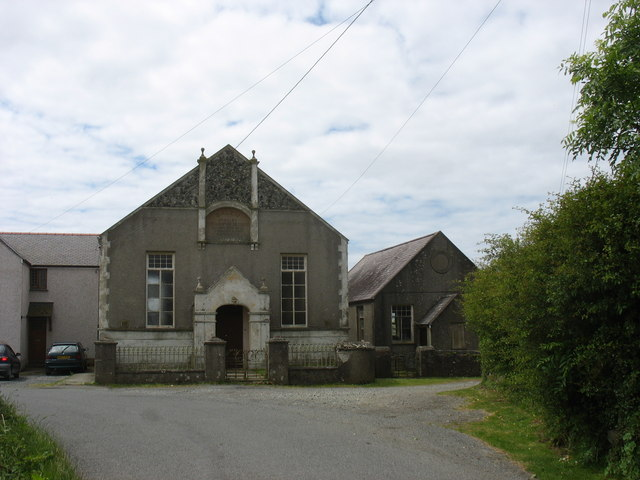

- Location within Anglesey
- Community: Llanfaethlu
- Principal area: Anglesey
- Preserved county: Gwynedd
- Country: Wales
- Sovereign state: United Kingdom
- Police: North Wales
- Fire: North Wales
- Ambulance: Welsh
- UK Parliament: Ynys Môn
- Senedd Cymru – Welsh Parliament: Bangor Conwy Môn

Llanfwrog is a village in Anglesey, in north-west Wales. It lies about 4 miles (6.4 km) to the northeast of Holyhead. The village lies near the coast about a mile east of Beach Gribin. A country road connects it with the A5025 road, one mile east, and Llanfaethlu, approximately 2.5 miles (4 km) to the north.

According to tradition, it was founded by Saint Mwrog. In the Welsh language Llanfwrog translates as the place/church of St. Mwrog. The only other place that is associated with the name of a Saint Mwrog is Llanfwrog, Denbighshire. In the Middle Ages Llanfwrog parish lay in the commote Talybolion in the Hundred of Cemaes. The church belonged to the rectory of the parish of Llan by the eighteenth century.
