= Crinow =

Village and parish in Pembrokeshire, Wales

Coordinates: 51.80°N 4.72°W

Crinow: Welsh: Crynwedd
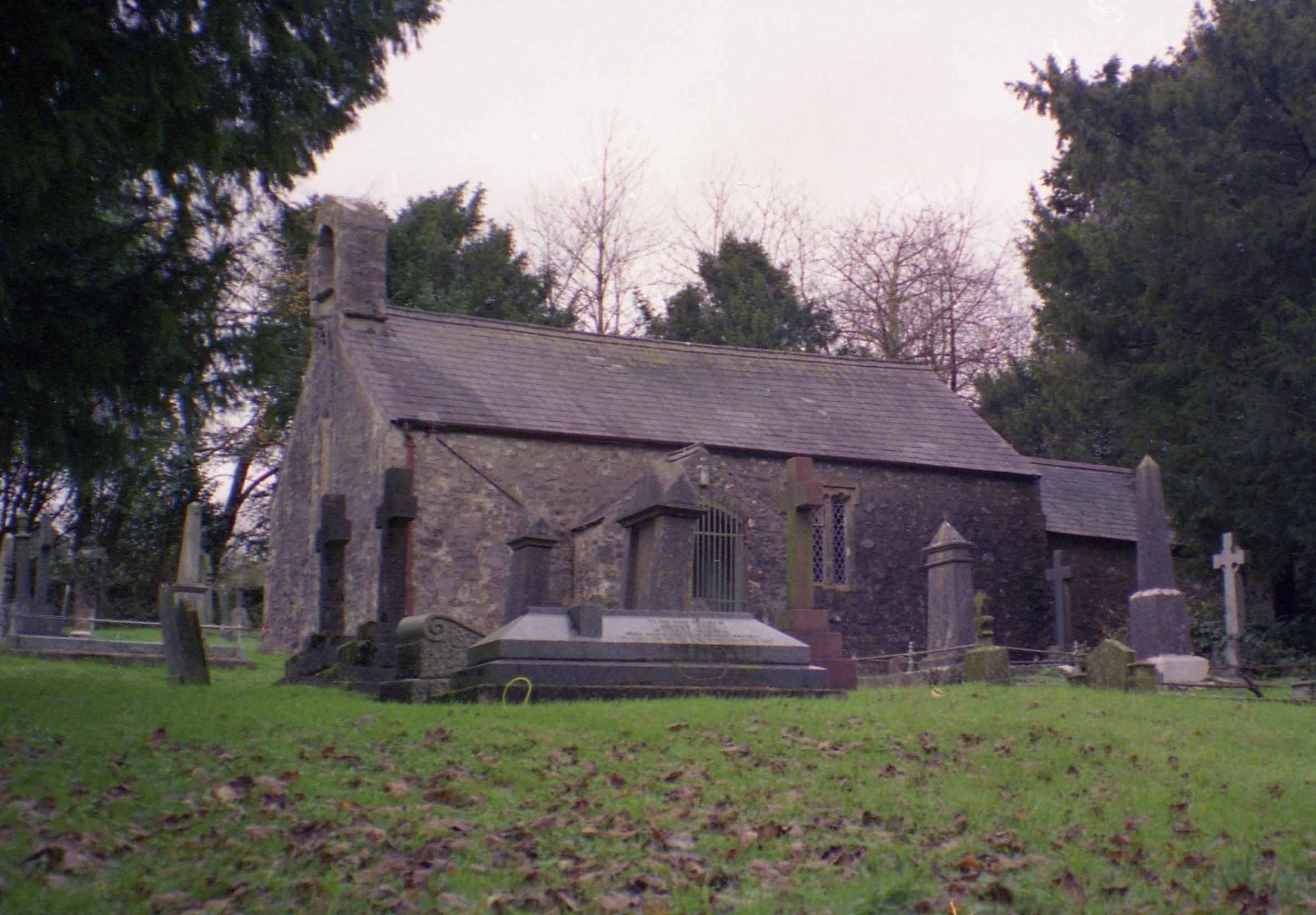
- Crinow church

- Location within Pembrokeshire
- OS grid reference: SN127144
- Community: Narberth
- Principal area: Pembrokeshire
- Country: Wales
- Sovereign state: United Kingdom
- Post town: NARBERTH
- Postcode district: SA67
- Dialling code: 01834
- Police: Dyfed-Powys
- Fire: Mid and West Wales
- Ambulance: Welsh

Crinow (Welsh: Crynwedd) is a village and parish in Pembrokeshire, Wales, 1.2 miles (1.9 km) east of Narberth. The parish is part of the community of Narberth.

== Name ==
The derivation of the placenames (English and Welsh) is obscure.

== History ==
The parish was originally a manor attached to St David's and it formed a detached part of the Hundred of Dungleddy. It appeared on a 1578 map as "Creno". It is close to the Pembrokeshire language frontier and was described as Welsh-speaking by George Owen in 1602, but today it is predominantly English speaking.

In 1934, a detached part of the parish of Lampeter Velfrey was added to Crinow. The pre-1934 parish had an area of 144 Ha. Its census populations were: 53 (1801): 69 (1851): 56 (1901): 32 (1951): 31 (1981). The percentage of Welsh speakers was 70 (1891): 48 (1931): 20 (1971).
