= Brongwyn =

Village in Ceredigion, Wales

Coordinates: 52.064199°N 4.498818°W

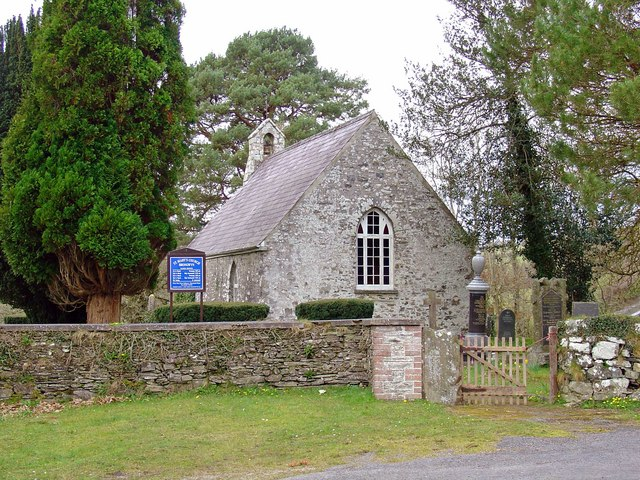

- Location within Ceredigion
- OS grid reference: SN 2880 4359
  - Cardiff: 69.5 mi (111.8 km)
  - London: 190.7 mi (306.9 km)
- Community: Beulah
- Principal area: Ceredigion
- Country: Wales
- Sovereign state: United Kingdom
- Post town: Newcastle Emlyn
- Postcode district: SA38
- Police: Dyfed-Powys
- Fire: Mid and West Wales
- Ambulance: Welsh
- UK Parliament: Ceredigion Preseli
- Senedd Cymru – Welsh Parliament: Ceredigion

Brongwyn (also spelt Bryngwyn or Bryn Gwyn) is a village in the community of Beulah, Ceredigion, Wales, which is 69.5 miles (111.9 km) from Cardiff and 190.7 miles (306.9 km) from London. Brongwyn is represented in the Senedd by Elin Jones (Plaid Cymru) and is part of the Ceredigion Preseli constituency in the House of Commons.

== History ==
The word derives from the Welsh language: "White meadows".

Bryn Gwyn was a civil parish, at the 1971 census (the last before the abolition of the parish), Bryn Gwyn had a population of 207. In 1974 Brongwyn became a community, on 1 April 1987 the community was abolished.

== See also ==
- High Sheriff of Montgomeryshire - 1838: Martin Williams, of Brongwyn
- List of localities in Wales by population
