= Maesmynis =

Settlement in Powys, Wales

Coordinates: 52.117°N 3.449°W

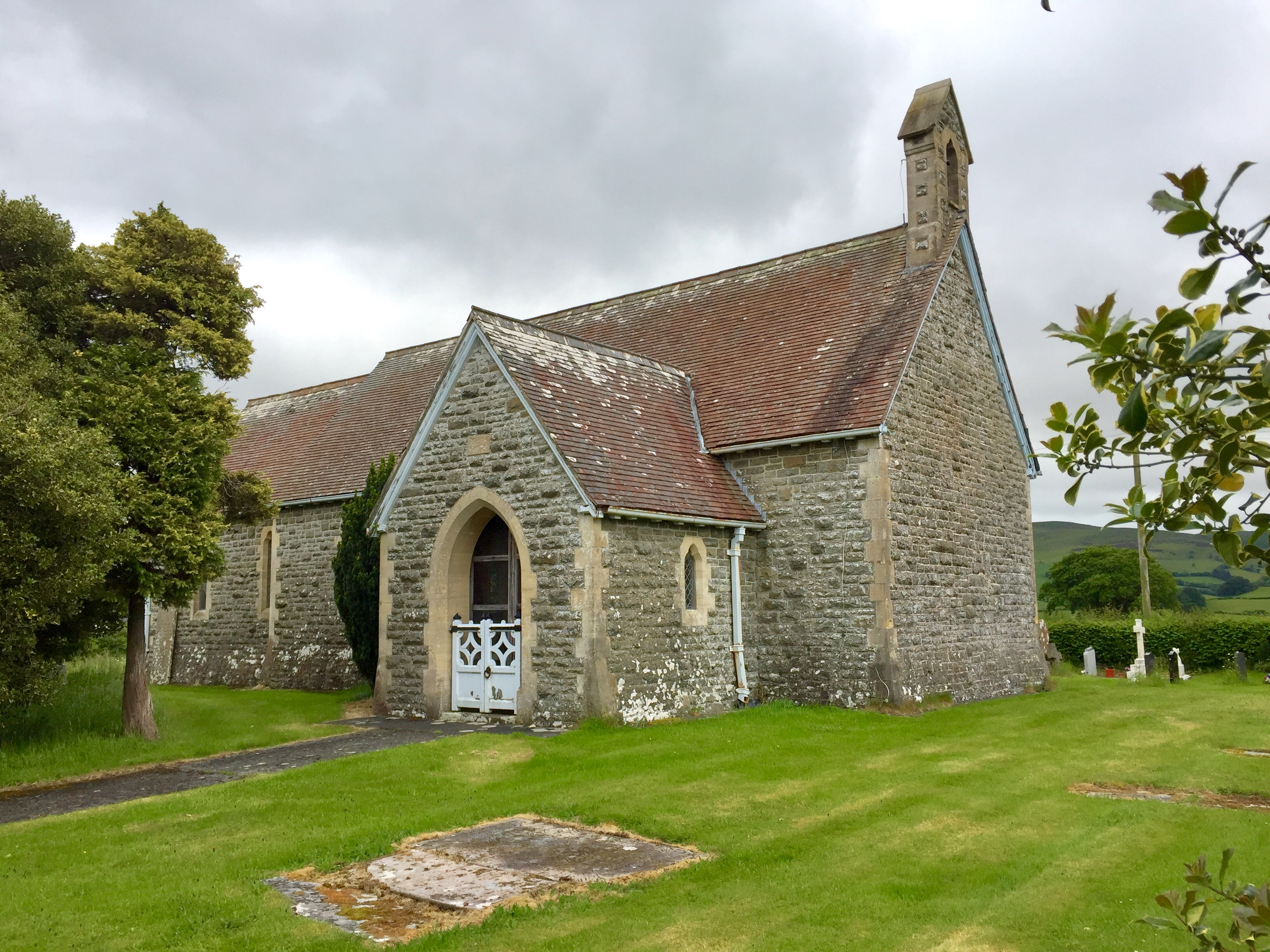
- St David's Church

- Location within Powys
- Community: Duhonw
- Principal area: Powys
- Preserved county: Powys
- Country: Wales
- Sovereign state: United Kingdom
- Police: Dyfed-Powys
- Fire: Mid and West Wales
- Ambulance: Welsh
- UK Parliament: Brecon, Radnor and Cwm Tawe
- Senedd Cymru – Welsh Parliament: Brecon and Radnorshire

Maesmynis (also spelt Maesmynys) is a small settlement and former community in Powys, Wales. In 1985 it was made part of the newly-formed community of Duhonw.

The church, dedicated to St David, was rebuilt in 1878 and refurbished in 1963.
