= Llangynog, Duhonw =

Former parish in Powys, Wales

Coordinates: 52.1012°N 3.4324°W

Llangynog
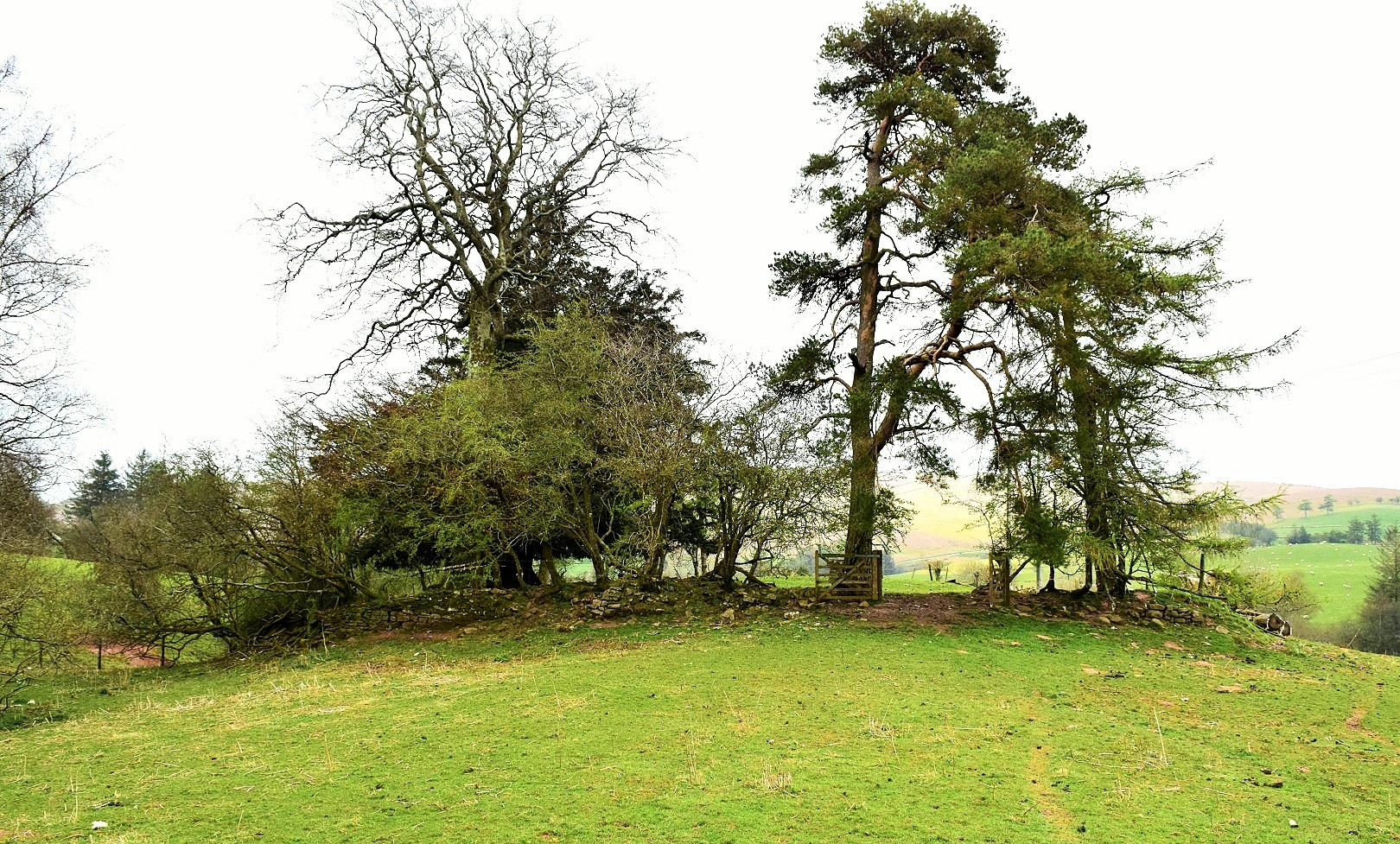
- The former site of St Cynog's Church

- Location within Powys
- Community: Duhonw
- Principal area: Powys
- Preserved county: Powys
- Country: Wales
- Sovereign state: United Kingdom
- Police: Dyfed-Powys
- Fire: Mid and West Wales
- Ambulance: Welsh
- UK Parliament: Brecon, Radnor and Cwm Tawe
- Senedd Cymru – Welsh Parliament: Brecon and Radnorshire

Llangynog is a former parish and community in Powys, Wales, about 6km south of Builth Wells. In 1985 it was made part of the newly-formed community of Duhonw.

The parish did not include any settlement, only a few farms. The church was decicated to St Cynog. The church was first mentioned in 1578. It was founded in medieval times or earlier, but saw little use during the 19th century. The church was last used in 1956, and it was ultimately demolished sometime in the 1960s.
