= Betws Ifan =

Village in Ceredigion, Wales

Coordinates: 52.100°N 04.479°W

- Location within Ceredigion
- OS grid reference: SN302475
- Principal area: Ceredigion
- Preserved county: Dyfed
- Country: Wales
- Sovereign state: United Kingdom
- Post town: NEWCASTLE EMYLN
- Postcode district: SA38 9
- Police: Dyfed-Powys
- Fire: Mid and West Wales
- Ambulance: Welsh
- UK Parliament: Ceredigion Preseli

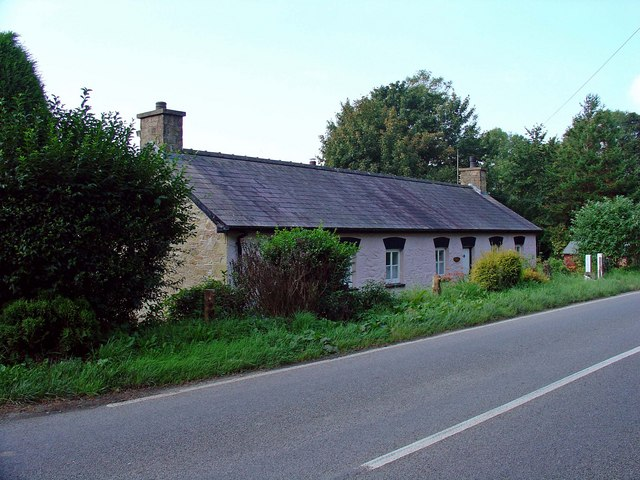
Llain-allt, Betws Ifan

Betws Ifan (antiquarian forms include Bettws Evan and Bettws Ieuvan) is a small village located in Ceredigion, Wales.

Surrounding villages include Beulah, Brongest, Glynarthen and Aberporth. Betws Ifan is only a few miles away from Cardigan town and Newcastle Emlyn town. The settlement is built around the village hall, located in the heart of the village. It also includes a bakery.
