= Talybolion =

Welsh medieval commote

Talybolion was a commote in the Hundred of Cemaes. The parishes of Llanfwrog and Llanbadrig were within its boundaries.
