= Cynnull-mawr =

Village in Ceredigion, Wales

Coordinates: 52°28′05″N 3°58′57″W

- Location within Ceredigion
- OS grid reference: SN 6542 8741
  - Cardiff: 76.3 mi (122.8 km)
  - London: 176.9 mi (284.7 km)
- Community: Ceulanamaesmawr
- Principal area: Ceredigion
- Country: Wales
- Sovereign state: United Kingdom
- Post town: Borth
- Postcode district: SY24
- Police: Dyfed-Powys
- Fire: Mid and West Wales
- Ambulance: Welsh
- UK Parliament: Ceredigion Preseli
- Senedd Cymru – Welsh Parliament: Ceredigion

Cynnull-mawr is a small village in the community of Ceulanamaesmawr, Ceredigion, Wales, which is 76.3 miles (122.8 km) from Cardiff and 176.9 miles (284.7 km) from London. Cynnull-mawr is represented in the Senedd by Elin Jones (Plaid Cymru) and is part of the Ceredigion Preseli constituency in the House of Commons.

== Etymology ==
'Cynnull' is the Welsh word for "a gathering"; the word "mawr" means "great"; "a great gathering".

== See also ==
- List of localities in Wales by population
