= Cathinog Hundred =

Former hundred of Carmarthenshire, Wales

Coordinates: 51.8808°N 4.0620°W

Cathinog (also spelt Catheiniog, Cetheiniog) was a hundred, a geographic division, in the traditional county of Carmarthenshire, Wales. Its name derives from St. Cathen, a local saint to whom a church is dedicated in Llangathen.
