= Martletwy =

Village, parish and community in Pembrokeshire, Wales

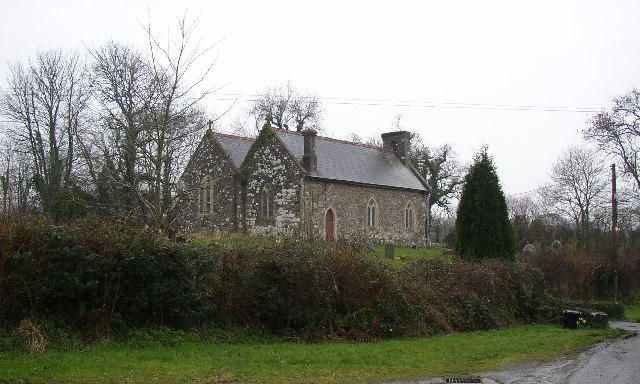
- Parish church of St Marcellus

- Location within Pembrokeshire
- Population: 570 (2011)
- OS grid reference: SN034106
- Community: Martletwy
- Principal area: Pembrokeshire
- Country: Wales
- Sovereign state: United Kingdom
- Post town: Narberth
- Postcode district: SA67 8
- Police: Dyfed-Powys
- Fire: Mid and West Wales
- Ambulance: Welsh
- UK Parliament: Mid and South Pembrokeshire
- Senedd Cymru – Welsh Parliament: Carmarthen West and South Pembrokeshire
- List of places UK Wales Pembrokeshire 51.76°N 4.85°W Map of the community

Martletwy is a village, parish and community in the county of Pembrokeshire, Wales.

== Description ==
Martletwy lies in south of the county, the nearest town is Narberth some 7 miles (11 km) distant to its north and east. It lies mainly to the west of the A4075 road, which links Carew in the south with the Canaston Bridge junction at the A40 road, although part of the Cross Hands area bridges the main road. To the west and south, the area's boundary is the Eastern Cleddau, to the southeast the River Cresswell forms its boundary.

== History ==
According to Lewis, the population of the parish in 1833 was 725. He described the area as good arable and pasture land, which was enclosed, and considerable supplies of coal and culm on the estate of Sir John Owen, which was shipped from a specially-constructed quay at Landshipping on the Eastern Cleddau.

=== Historic building ===
Blackpool Mill is a Grade II-listed disused mill dating to 1813 which is intact and contains working machinery. It was operational until the Second World War and in 2017 plans for its development as a heritage attraction were being considered.

== Martletwy parish ==
The parish church is dedicated to St Marcellus and is in the diocese of St Davids. There are Baptist, Methodist and Independent chapels.

== Martletwy Community ==
Martletwy consists of the following villages: Martletwy, Coedcanlas, Minwear, Newton North, Landshipping and Lawrenny.

== Governance ==
A Martletwy electoral ward exists, though this ward stretches beyond the confines of Martletwy community, covering the neighbouring Llawhaden and Uzmaston, Boulston and Slebech. It had a total population at the 2011 Census of 1,970.

== Notable places ==
The village was best known for being home to the Oakwood theme park.
