= Cemais (Anglesey) =

Welsh medieval cantref

Coordinates: 53.41°N 4.44°W

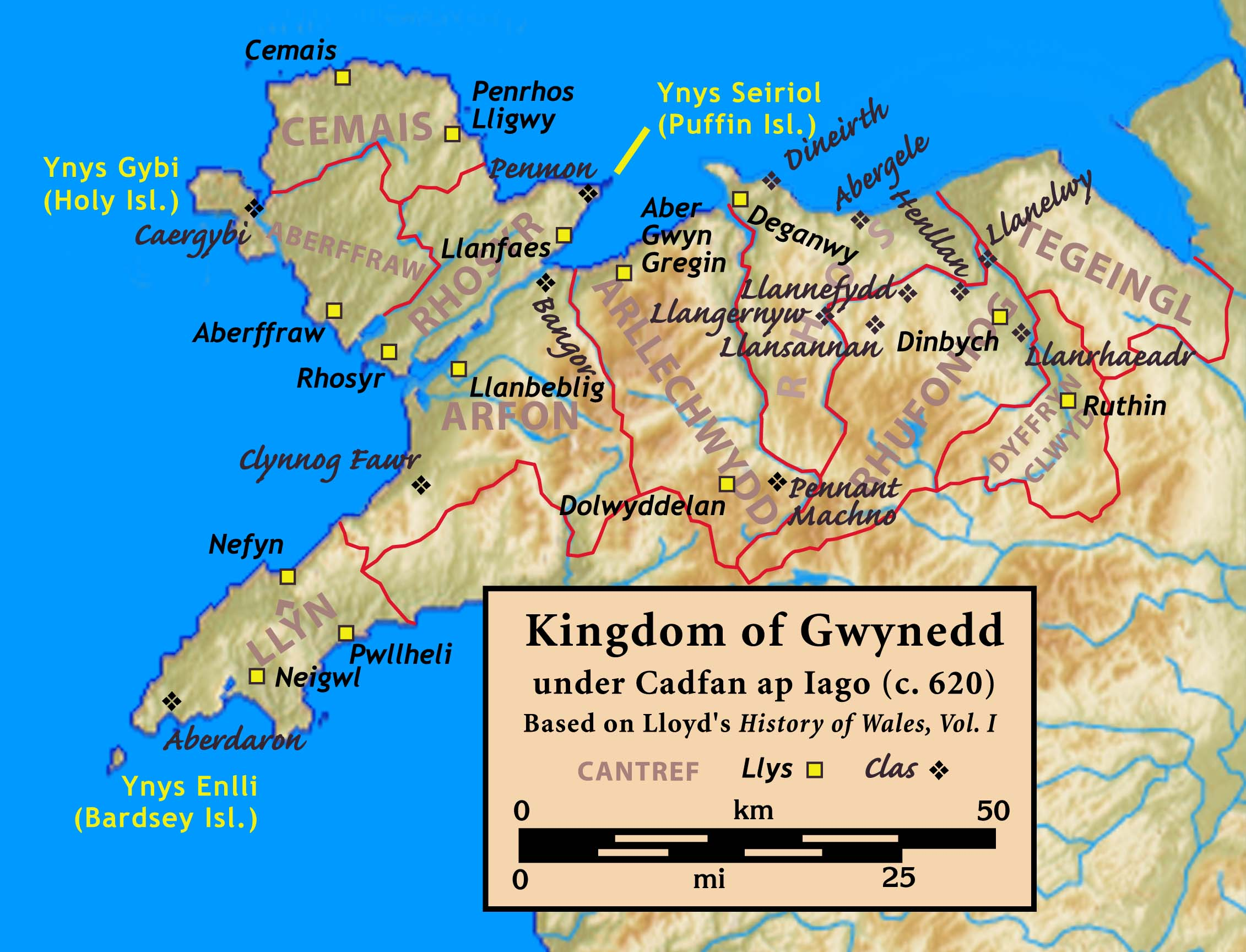
Kingdom of Gwynedd c.620, showing cantrefi

Cemais was one of the three medieval cantrefs on the island of Anglesey, north Wales, in the Kingdom of Gwynedd. It lay on the northern side of the island on the Irish Sea.

The cantref consisted of the two cwmwds of Talybolion and Twrcelyn.

== See also ==
- Aberffraw cantref
- Rhosyr (cantref)
