= Llandygwydd =

Village in Ceredigion, Wales

Coordinates: 52.06°N 4.56°W

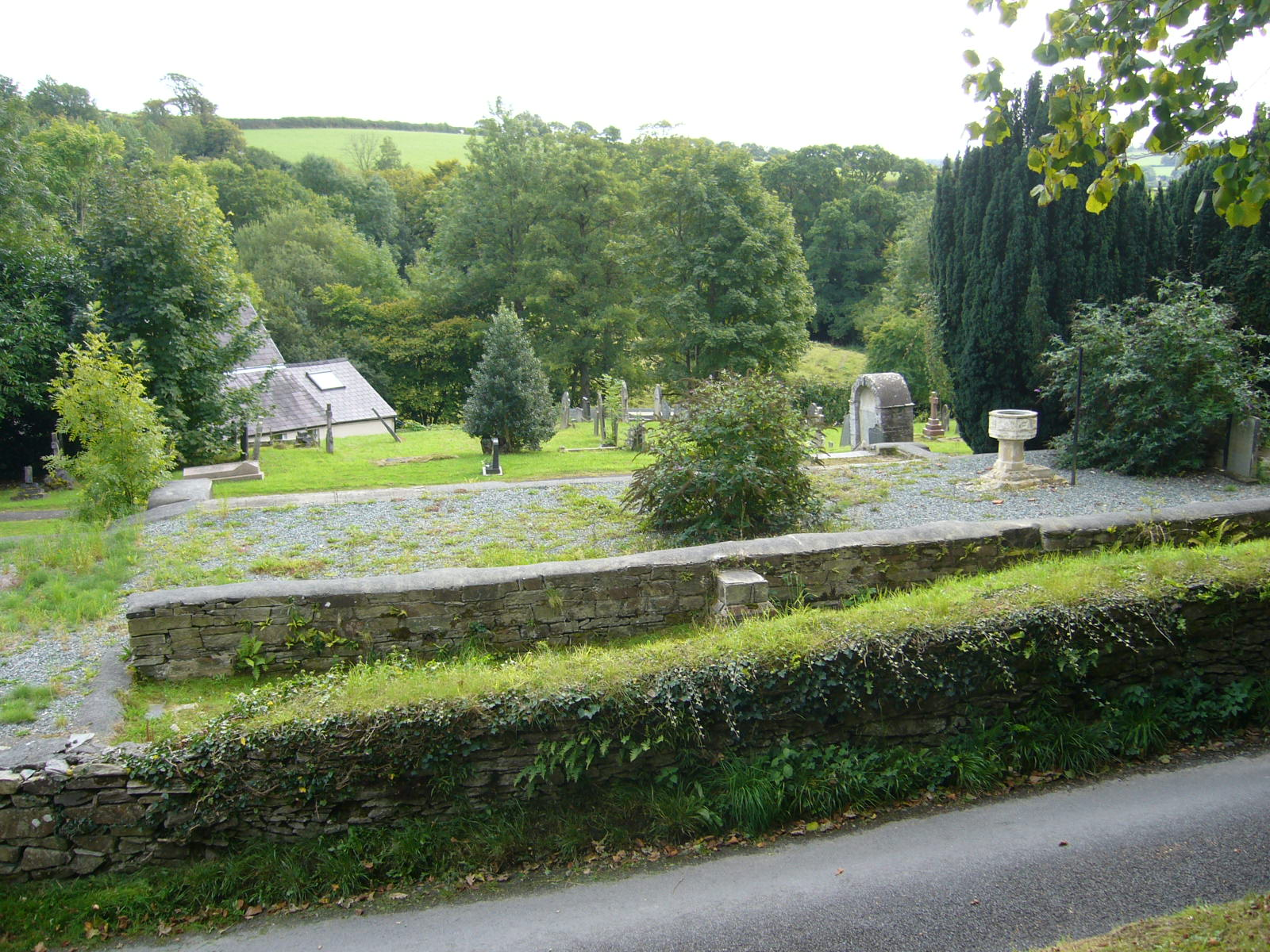
- Foundations of the church of Saint Tygwydd

- Location within Ceredigion
- OS grid reference: SN241437
- Principal area: Ceredigion
- Preserved county: Dyfed
- Country: Wales
- Sovereign state: United Kingdom
- Post town: Cardigan
- Postcode district: SA43
- Dialling code: 01239
- Police: Dyfed-Powys
- Fire: Mid and West Wales
- Ambulance: Welsh
- UK Parliament: Ceredigion Preseli
- Senedd Cymru – Welsh Parliament: Ceredigion Penfro

Llandygwydd is a small settlement in Ceredigion, West Wales, which lies between Newcastle Emlyn and the town of Cardigan.

== Amenities and history ==
A small stream runs through the village. There also is a parish church with a small graveyard.

It has no commercial buildings. The post office closed in 2001. The village hall is mostly used as a polling station by the local people. The village also has its own short mat bowling club, which meets at the village hall.

== Notable people ==
- Theophilus Evans (1693–1767), cleric and historian of Pen-y-wenallt, was christened in the church of Saint Tygwydd in 1693.
- Morgan Jones (1829–1905), first-class cricketer and High Sheriff of Cardiganshire, was born in the village.

== Reference ==
- Roberts, Enid Pierce (2016). "Evans, Theophilus (1693-1767), cleric, historian, and man of letters". In Johnston, Dafydd; Gruffydd Jones, Elin Haf (eds.). Dictionary of Welsh Biography. Aberystwyth: The National Library of Wales.
