= Llanynis =

Former parish in Powys, Wales

Coordinates: 52.140°N 3.446°W

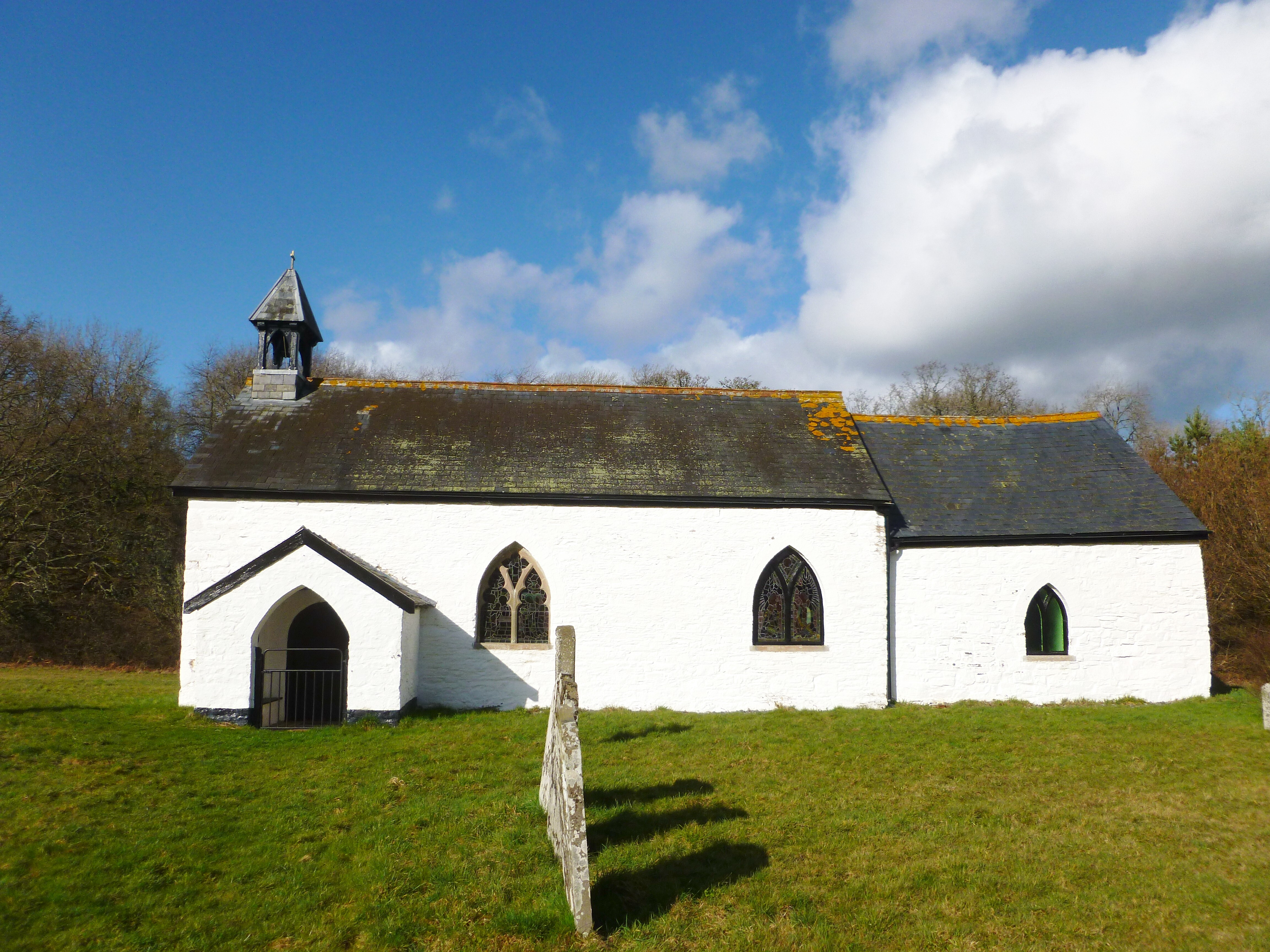
- St David's Church

- Location within Powys
- Community: Duhonw
- Principal area: Powys
- Preserved county: Powys
- Country: Wales
- Sovereign state: United Kingdom
- Police: Dyfed-Powys
- Fire: Mid and West Wales
- Ambulance: Welsh
- UK Parliament: Brecon, Radnor and Cwm Tawe
- Senedd Cymru – Welsh Parliament: Brecon and Radnorshire

Llanynis (also spelt Llanynys) is a former parish and community in Powys, Wales. In 1985 it was made part of the newly-formed community of Duhonw.

Today Llanynis is an isolated church, not accessible on any public road. The church is dedicated to St David, and formerly St Llyr. There is no village associated with the parish.
