= Minwear =

Village and parish in Pembrokeshire, Wales

Coordinates: 51.78°N 4.84°W

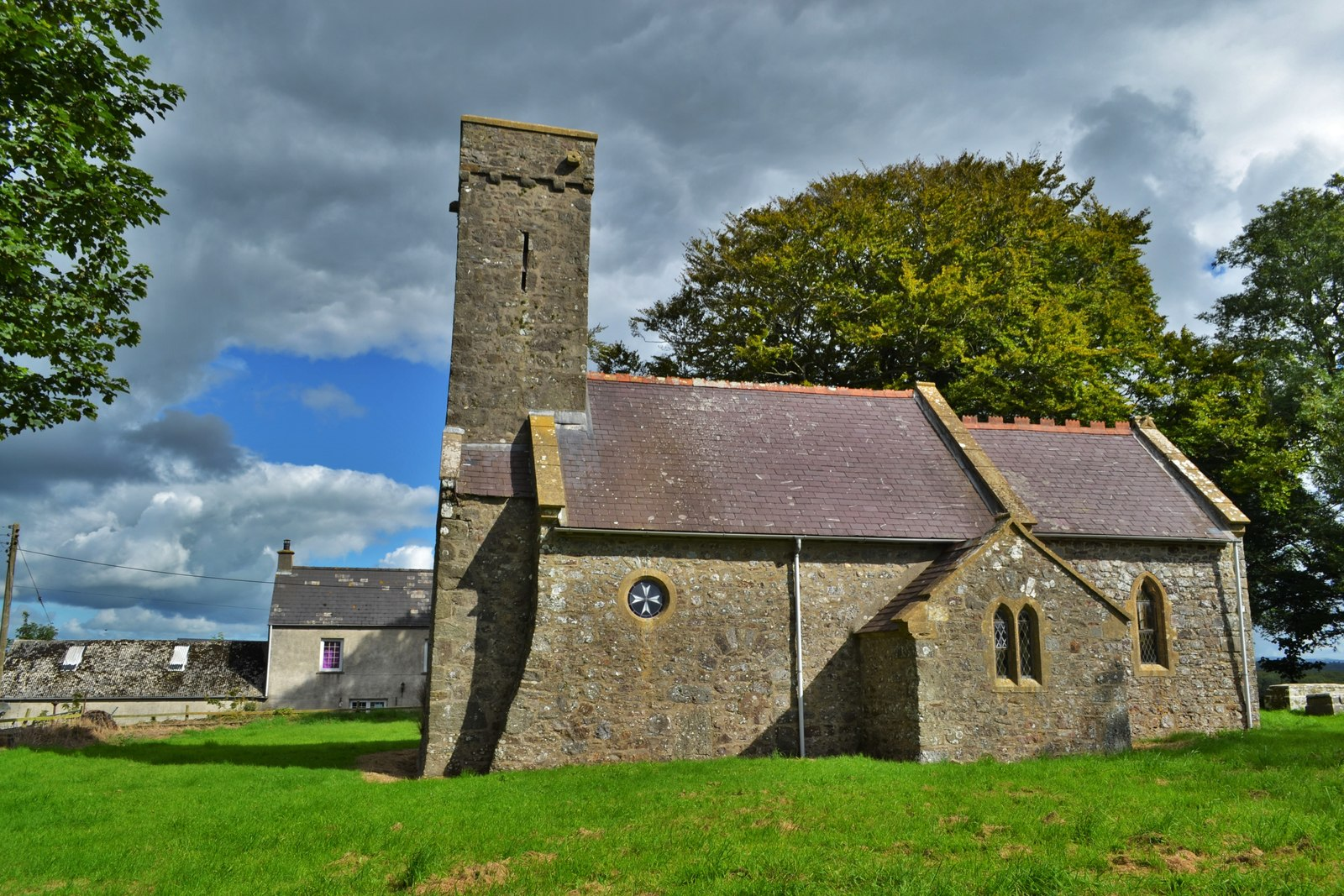
- Church of St Womar

- Location within Pembrokeshire
- OS grid reference: SN038130
- Community: Martletwy
- Principal area: Pembrokeshire
- Country: Wales
- Sovereign state: United Kingdom
- Police: Dyfed-Powys
- Fire: Mid and West Wales
- Ambulance: Welsh

Minwear is a former parish and village in the community of Martletwy, in the county of Pembrokeshire, Wales, on the Eastern Cleddau river, 4 1/2 miles (7.2 km) southwest of the town of Narberth. Its history can be traced back to the 12th century. Wood from Minwear Forest supported local industries from mediaeval times to the 19th century.

== Parish church ==
The parish church is dedicated to St Womar. It appears on a 1578 map as Mynware. The church is a Grade II listed building dating from Norman times, but much of the original architecture was obscured by a 19th-century restoration. Minwear is in the present-day Church in Wales parish of Jeffreyston with Reynoldston and Loveston and Martletwy with Lawrenny and Yerbeston.

== History ==
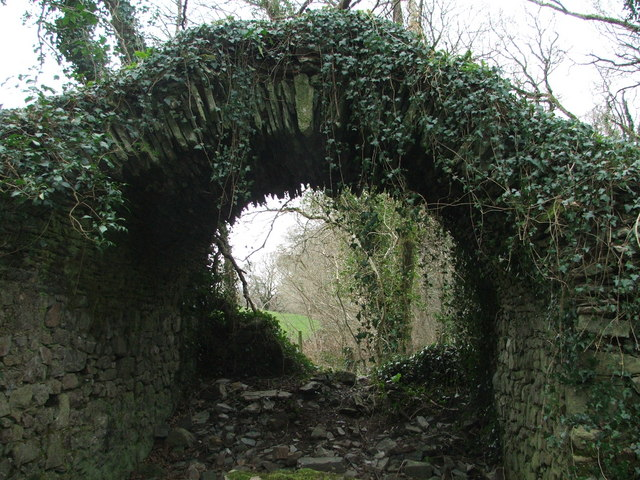
The Sisters' House ruins

The parish and tithes were granted to the Knights of St. John of Jerusalem in 1150. The order also had an establishment now known as the Sisters' House, today a ruin, but marked on the 1578 parish map of Pembrokeshire as Sisterhowses. In 1540 the order was ejected under the Dissolution of the Monasteries; the village had disappeared by 1850, leaving just the church and a farming hamlet.

The 1870 Imperial Gazetteer describes the parish as covering 1,957 acres (792 ha) with a population of 99 in 16 houses.

Minwear Wood (or Minwear Forest), originally part of the mediaeval Narberth Forest which was recorded in the 12th century, was a deciduous forest until the 20th century, when conifers were planted. Before that, the wood was used for charcoal for the iron foundry at Blackpool Mill from 1730 and for shipbuilding until both industries declined. Today, riverside walks are a local attraction, where the variable salinity of the tidal river supports a wide range of plant and bird species.
