= Bluestone, Pembrokeshire =

Holiday park in Pembrokeshire, southwest Wales

Coordinates: 51.783°N 4.801°W

Bluestone National Park Resort
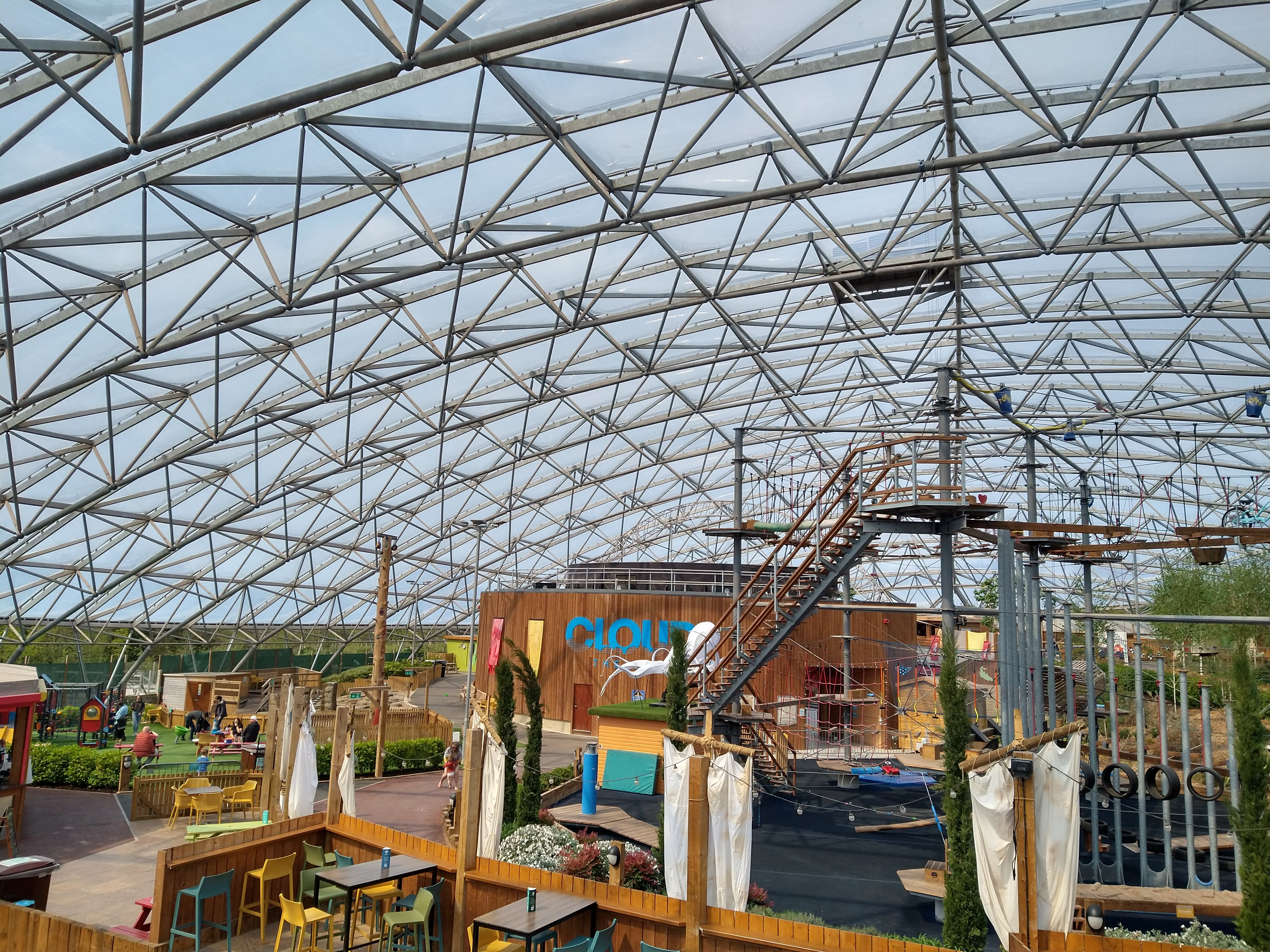
- Bluestone Serendome interior
- Industry: Leisure
- Founded: July 2008
- Headquarters: Narberth, Pembrokeshire, Wales
- Products: Short breaks, family holidays, leisure activities
- Owner: Bluestone Resorts Ltd
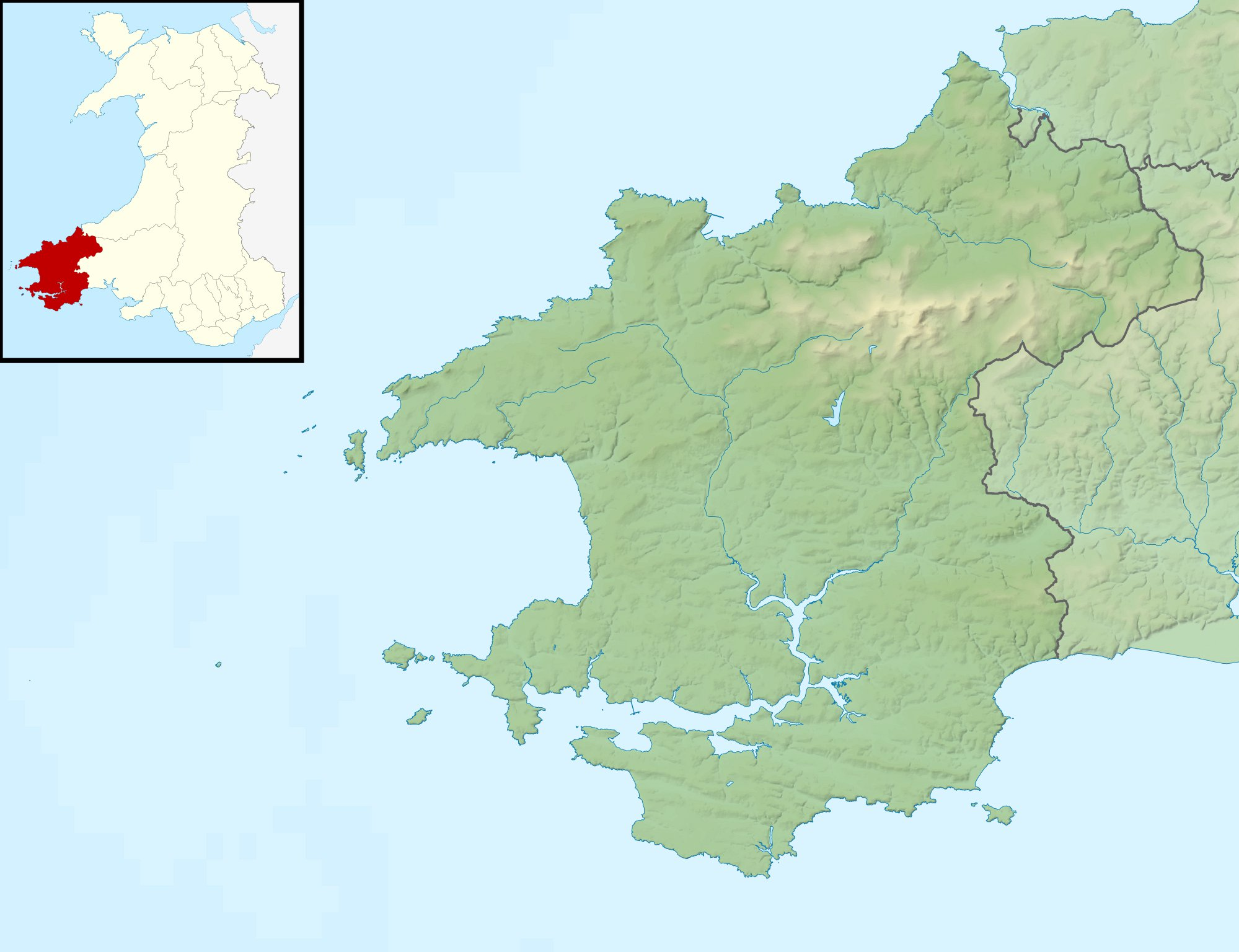

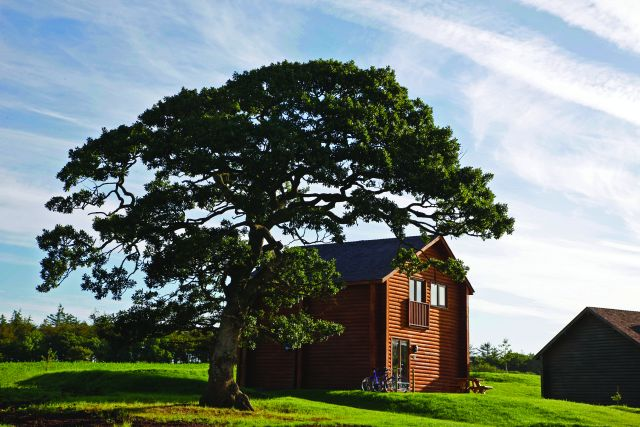
Bluestone National Park Resort

Bluestone National Park Resort is a holiday park in Pembrokeshire, southwest Wales. The resort falls partly within the boundaries of the Pembrokeshire Coast National Park. The park is owned by several private backers and Pembrokeshire County Council and employs about 700 people.

== Description ==
The resort's accommodation consists of 344 timber lodges, as well as cottages and studio apartments set in 500 acres (2.0 km^{2}). This area includes the Blue Lagoon indoor water park (not to be confused with the nearby Blue Lagoon former quarry of Abereiddy), Steep Ravine outdoor activity area, an indoor playground and a medieval themed activity area. The resort itself is centred on the "village" which has shops, restaurants, a pub, wine store and a spa.

Within the boundaries of the resort are a ruined manor house (known locally as Castell Coch) and the external structure of Newton North parish church.

The park is car-free (except on check-in and check-out days), but walking and cycling is encouraged. Electric golf buggies can be rented by day or for a full stay and are commonly seen around the park. A number of play areas and food outlets are housed in the Serendome.

The park has been described as resembling a top-end housing estate.

The park is close to Oakwood Theme Park, which closed in 2025.

== History ==
In 2016 Bluestone announced plans to spend £2.5 million restoring Blackpool Mill site with the addition of a miniature railway as a tourist attraction, but following objections from the National Park, the plans were deferred by Bluestone, and subsequently rejected, with Bluestone invited to re-apply.

Bluestone subsequently reapplied for change of use and it was granted as well as planning permission for 80 additional lodges
