= Blue Lagoon Water Park, Pembrokeshire =

Water park in Pembrokeshire, Wales

Coordinates: 51.78°N 4.808°W

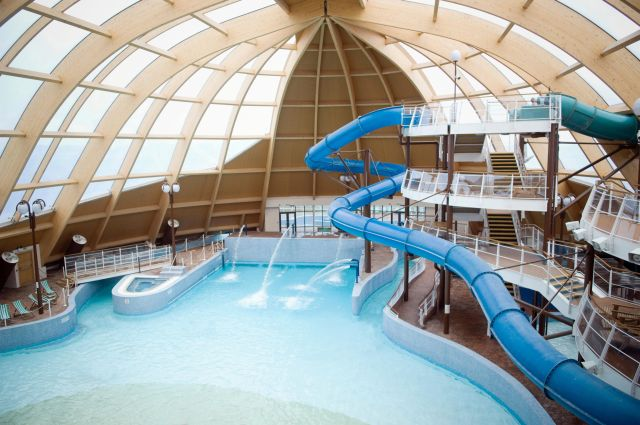
Blue Lagoon Water Park

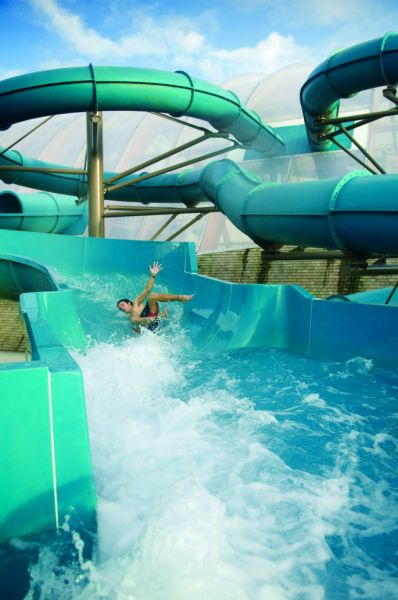
The water park's slides

Blue Lagoon Water Park is an indoor waterpark near Canaston Bridge, Narberth in Pembrokeshire, Wales in the Bluestone National Park Resort. It opened in 2008.

== Features ==
The waterpark features a beach-style swimming pool with a wave machine, spa pools, river rapids ride, two water flumes, a lazy river that takes you outside, a pirates’ shipwreck and a separate wet play area for children in the water cove.

Blue Lagoon is only available for residents of Bluestone Resort who have "unlimited access".

The waterpark is heated with locally sourced biomass. In 2022, it was rated "excellent" by the Royal Life Saving Society UK.

The park was closed for over a year during the COVID-19 pandemic in Wales, re-opening to only residents of Bluestone resort in April 2021. By April 2022, the water park had retained the exclusive policy. The move was criticised by locals.

== Construction ==
The roof structure is constructed of timber frame, covered in wood tiles and two layers of transparent plastic.
