= C. Collin Davies =

British historian and historical geographer (1896–1974)

- Born: Cuthbert Collin Davies; 16 April 1896; Narberth, Pembrokeshire, Wales
- Died: 5 November 1974 (aged 78)
- Citizenship: British
- Occupations: Historian, historical geographer, professor
- Known for: An Historical Atlas of the Indian Peninsula

Academic background
- Education: University of Wales, Aberystwyth (BA); University of Cambridge (PhD)

Academic work
- Discipline: South Asian history, Historical geography
- Institutions: School of Oriental and African Studies; University of Oxford
- Notable works: The Problem of the North-West Frontier; Warren Hastings and Oudh

Cuthbert Collin Davies (16 April 1896 – 5 November 1974), who published as C. Collin Davies, was a Welsh historian and historical geographer.

He was a scholar of South Asian history and is best known for his historical atlas of the Indian subcontinent, which became a standard reference work for students and researchers.

He spent most of his career at the University of Oxford, where he served as Reader in Indian History for nearly three decades.

== Early life and education ==
Davies was born in Narberth, Pembrokeshire, Wales, on 16 April 1896, the son of David Collins Davies. He studied at the University of Wales, Aberystwyth, where he earned his Bachelor of Arts degree in 1923. He then went to the University of Cambridge, where he completed his PhD in 1926 at Peterhouse.

During World War I, Davies served as an officer in France from 1915 to 1916, then in the Indian North-West Frontier, and also took part in the Third Anglo-Afghan War.

== Academic career ==
In 1926, Davies was appointed Lecturer in Indian History at the School of Oriental and African Studies (SOAS) in London, a position he held until 1936. He supervised several doctoral theses during this period, which are now held at the British Library.

In 1936, he moved to the University of Oxford, where he became Reader in Indian History. He remained at Oxford until 1963, a tenure of twenty-seven years.

== Research and publications ==
Davies work focused on the political and geographical history of British India. His first major book, The Problem of the North-West Frontier, 1890–1908, was published by Cambridge University Press in 1932 and ran to 234 pages.

It examined the strategic and administrative challenges of controlling the frontier region of British India, a subject he knew firsthand from his military service. He followed this with Warren Hastings and Oudh in 1939, a study of the early years of British rule in India under the first Governor-General. He also edited several volumes of historical documents, including The Benares Diary of Warren Hastings (1948) and The Private Correspondence of Lord Macartney (1950). Davies is perhaps best known for An Historical Atlas of the Indian Peninsula, first published by Oxford University Press in 1949.

The atlas, which contained 47 maps in 96 pages, became a standard reference for students of Indian history and was reprinted several times, with a second edition appearing in 1959. He also published an article on Warren Hastings and the Younger Pitt in the English Historical Review in 1955.

== Legacy ==
In 1973, a group of scholars honored Davies with a Festschrift titled Essays in Indian History, in Honour of Cuthbert Collin Davies, edited by Donovan Williams and E. Daniel Potts, published by Asia Publishing House with xiv and 259 pages. Davies died on 5 November 1974. The theses he supervised are preserved at the British Library's Asian and African Studies collection. His historical atlas continues to be cited in scholarly works on the historical geography of India.
