= Wickedly Welsh Chocolate =

Chocolate factory in Haverfordwest, Wales

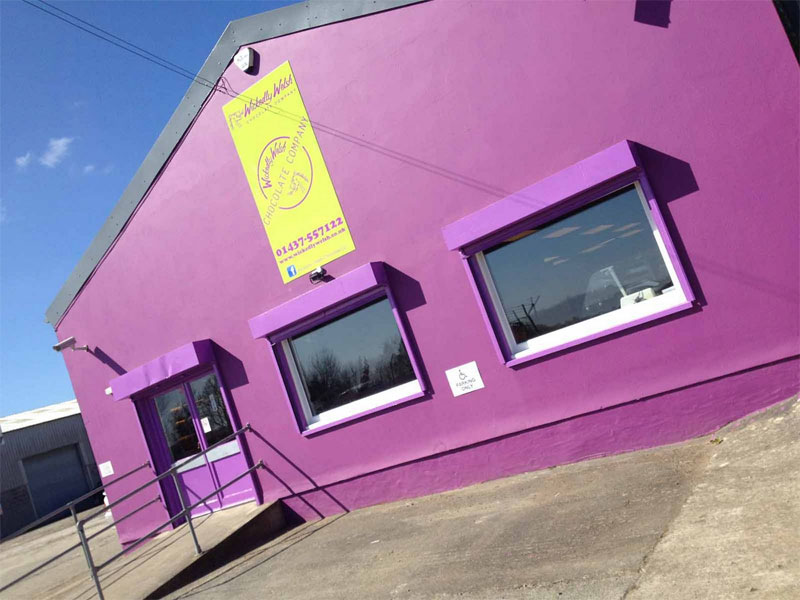
Outside Wickedly Welsh

Wickedly Welsh Chocolate is a chocolate factory located in Haverfordwest, Pembrokeshire, Wales. The business makes its own chocolate at the premises. The company's product is available at 25 stores in the local area including Oakwood Theme Park.

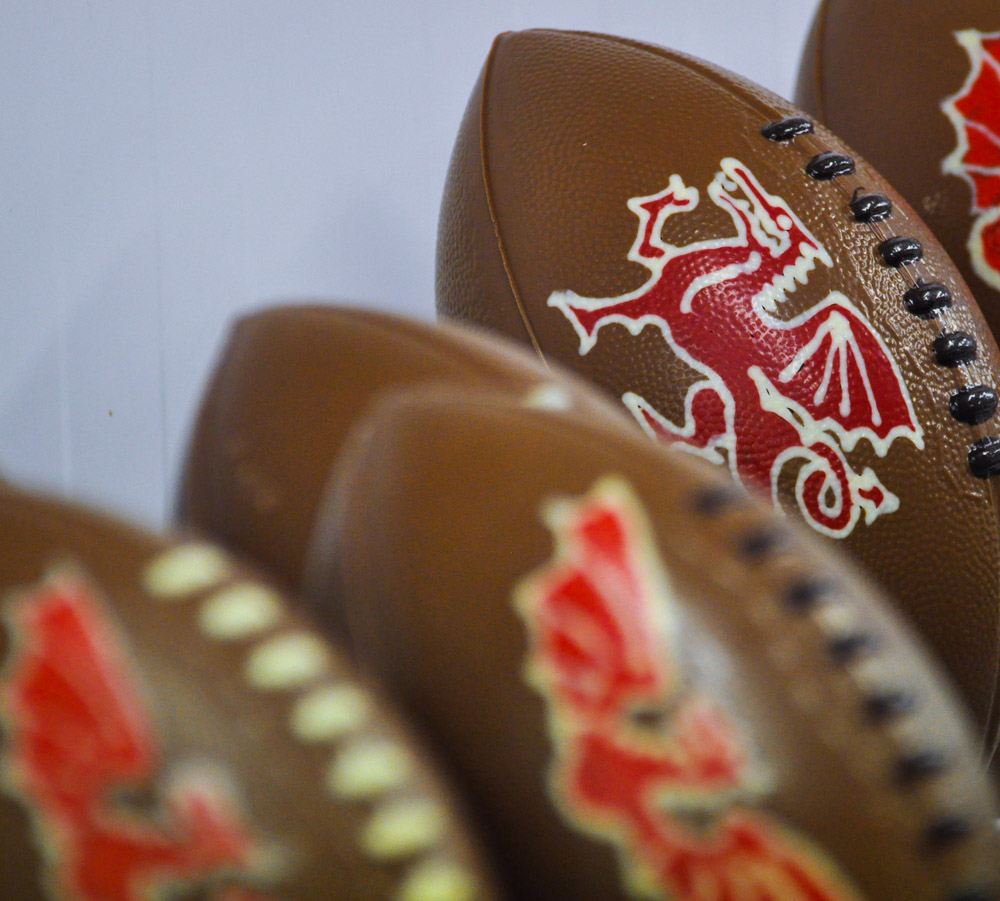
Wickedly Welsh chocolate rugby balls

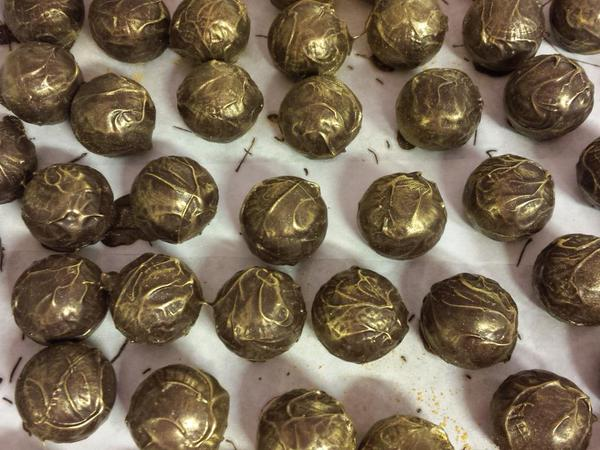
Flavanol rich chocolates

== History ==
The factory was started by Mark Owen in April 2014, who suffers from type 1 diabetes. Consequently, the company's product range is diabetic-friendly. The business creates a range of chocolates, amongst which is a chocolate high in flavanols. Owen's wife Karen had previously worked on the nearby Pemberton's Chocolate Farm in Llanboidy and knew the appropriate machinery to purchase. The couple tried to take over running of the farm, which was on the market, but failed to do so, setting up their current premises instead.

In the eight months after opening, the factory catered to 20,000 visitors, although due to a huge increase in production the former Visitors Centre and café are now permanently closed The company runs a regular newsletter via email to around 15,000 subscribers with ideas for chocolate-based recipes. Local MP Stephen Crabb has praised the factory and business, calling it "a fantastic addition to Pembrokeshire's tourism offer". The company runs regular promotions for Valentine's Day, Mother's Day and Halloween. The company have produced a Willy Wonka-themed "Golden Ticket" campaign, with winners receiving tickets for both the factory and Oakwood Theme Park. For Easter 2015, the factory collaborated with Wales Online to provide a VIP tour of the factory as a competition prize.
