= Narberth Castle =

Castle in Narberth, Pembrokeshire, Wales

Coordinates: 51.796°N 4.742°W

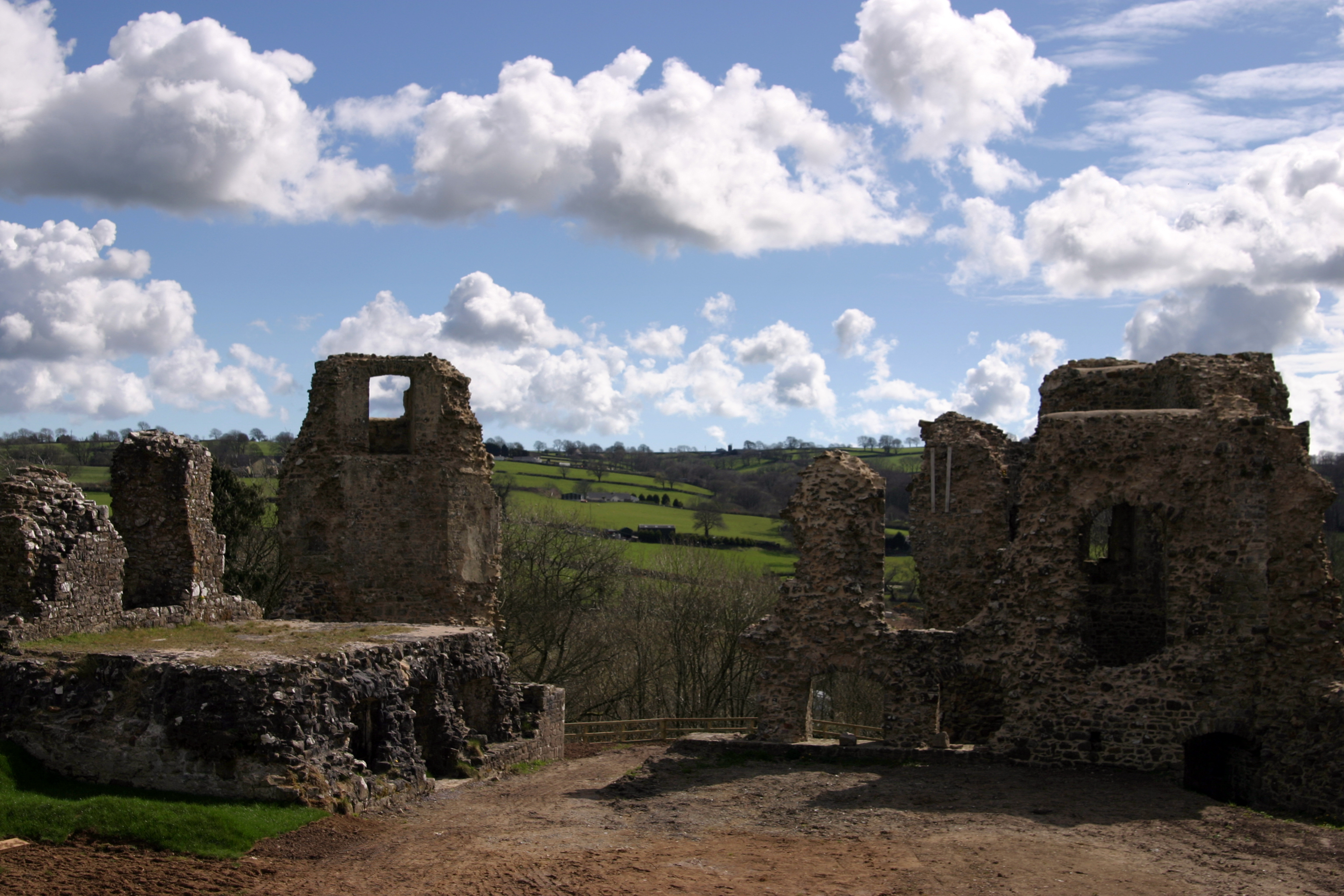
Narberth castle ruins, looking towards the south. Photo taken shortly after safety work had been carried out in 2004–05, prior to re-opening to the public.

Narberth Castle (Welsh: Castell Arberth) is a ruined Norman fortress in the town of Narberth, Pembrokeshire, West Wales. It forms part of the Landsker Line.

A chronicle in the Cotton library mentions that, in 1116, Gruffydd ap Rhys attacked and destroyed the castle of arberth; this however probably refers to the nearby Sentence Castle, the stone castle at Narberth not having been built until over 100 years later.

== Origins ==
The current ruins are undoubtedly Norman and seem to date from the 13th century, having been built by Andrew Perrot. However the castle is mentioned in the third branch of the Mabinogi as the place where Rhiannon was imprisoned and forced to carry travellers through the gates as penance for killing her son. Although there is some controversy over the actual location of the castle in the Mabinogi (there are at least two other earthworks nearby that are contenders, but neither are in good defensive positions compared to the site of this one), the Normans often built castles on top of earlier defensive structures and it is plausible that the original was obliterated.

== History ==
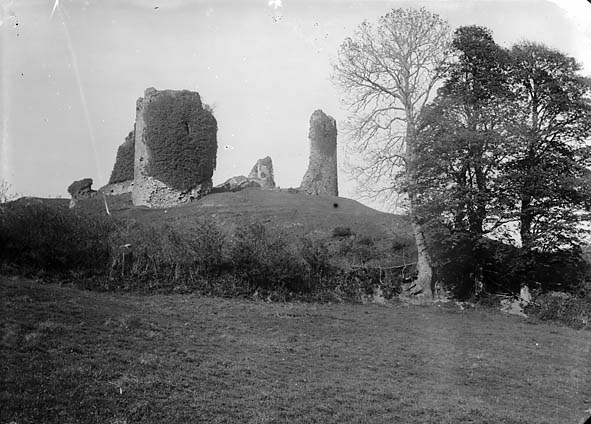
The ruins in about 1885

The castle never changed hands throughout the Glyndŵr Rising in 1400–1415 and was slighted after being taken by Oliver Cromwell in the English Civil War. Excavations have found more than 20 graves on the north side dating from the 12th century to the 13th, hinting that the area may have once been the site of a church.

In the early part of the 20th century, the annual town fair held a procession which ended in the castle, with dancing and music. In 2005, the castle was opened again to the public after being taken over by the council and made safe. At the opening ceremony, the official documents confirming the 'twinning' of Narberth and Ludlow were signed by the towns' mayors. There was also a performance of a specially written adaptation by Derek Webb of the Mabinogion tale Culhwch and Olwen featuring many local children and a giant boar made by a local artist.

== Style ==
The castle has provided a good deal of building material for the surrounding houses and the remains are mostly single and double storey walls, with the barrel-vaulted kitchen cellars intact. No upper storey rooms are intact. There is an early engraving visible on an information board at Narberth railway station (and possible elsewhere in the town) which shows now-vanished tall chimneys of a Flemish style that can still be seen at the well-preserved Manorbier Castle.
