= Canaston Bridge =

Bridge in Pembrokeshire, Wales

Coordinates: 51.80°N 4.81°W

- Location within Pembrokeshire
- Principal area: Pembrokeshire
- Country: Wales
- Sovereign state: United Kingdom
- Police: Dyfed-Powys
- Fire: Mid and West Wales
- Ambulance: Welsh
- UK Parliament: Preseli Pembrokeshire
- Senedd Cymru – Welsh Parliament: Preeli Pembrokeshire

Canaston Bridge
- Pont Canaston
- Interactive map of Canaston Bridge

Location
- Robeston Wathen, Pembrokeshire
- Roads at junction: A40; A4075; B4314

Construction
- Type: Roundabout
- Opened: 2011
- Maintained by: South Wales Trunk Road Agent

Canaston Bridge is the location in Pembrokeshire, southwest Wales where the A40 trunk road crosses the Eastern Cleddau. It is on the edge of the Pembrokeshire Coast National Park, 14 miles (23 km) northeast of Pembroke, and close to Oakwood Theme Park and Blue Lagoon waterpark. It is about half a mile upstream of Blackpool Mill, at the normal tidal limit of the river.

== Name ==
The origin of the name is obscure. Several properties use the name Canaston, as well as Canaston Wood.

== Activity ==
A pumping station removes some 33 megalitres of water per day for Welsh Water. The river is monitored at Canaston Bridge for flood risk downstream. Hydrometric data at the bridge are kept by Natural Resources Wales.

Canaston Woods Walk, promoted by Pembrokeshire County Council, starts at Canaston Bridge.

== History ==
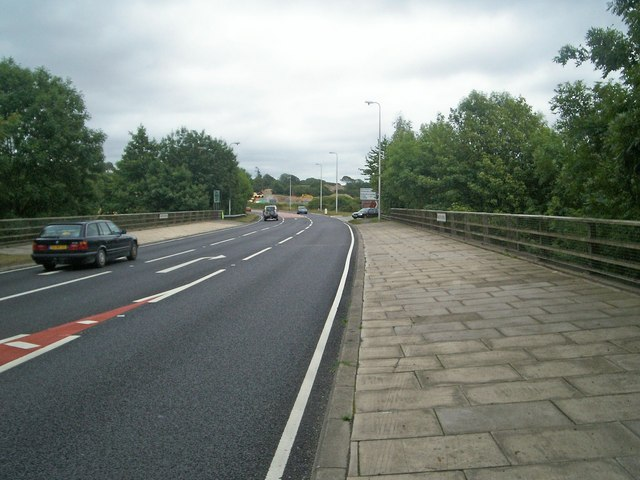
Bridge carrying the A40 in 2006 (A4075 beyond)

In 1914, the Royal Commission on Monuments published details of the bridge, with an illustration:

The present Canaston Bridge is probably not of earlier date than the late 16th or early 17th century, and it doubtless has witnessed more than one renewal. Placed as it is on the principal line of communication from Gloucester and South Wales to Haverfordwest and St Davids, and at the point where the Cleddau ceases to be tidal, there must have been a bridge immediately upon or closely adjacent to the present site from the 12th century when transit of men and military stores to Ireland became a matter of importance. The name always appears in early records as Cananiston or the like.

Canaston Bridge is on the border between the ancient parishes of Robeston Wathen and Slebech. It is marked on a 1578 parish map as Cannaston, with a bridge shown, but there was no recorded parish or settlement of that name. The Royal Commission recorded the name as a historic place name. Canaston Bridge is listed as a place name in the parish of Slebech and others, as it borders several.

Canaston Wood is a remnant of the mediaeval Narberth Forest, which was recorded in the early 12th century. The Manor of Canaston was recorded in the 14th century. Canaston Wood was mentioned as significant by George Owen in about 1600. Canaston Bridge itself is mediaeval, and is a Grade II listed structure. In 1635 there was a charcoal-fuelled blast furnace at Canaston Wood, the only known example of its period.

The Roads from Tavernspite Act 1828 (9 Geo. 4. c. cvi), which replaced the earlier Roads from Tavernspite (Pembrokeshire) Act 1808 (48 Geo. 3. c. cxxxix), exacted tolls on the roads around the bridge.

Up to the time that the Cleddau Bridge was opened in 1975, Canaston Bridge was the lowest bridging point on the river.

In 2009, when the Robeston Wathen bypass was being constructed (including a new bridge), Dyfed Archaeological Trust carried out an investigation close to the bridge. They discovered flint scattering (Mesolithic or Neolithic) and evidence of early metal working.

== Wildlife ==
Swallows and martins nest between the girders beneath the A40 road.
