= Narberth Town Hall =

Municipal Building in Narberth, Wales

- Neuadd y Dref Arberth (Welsh)
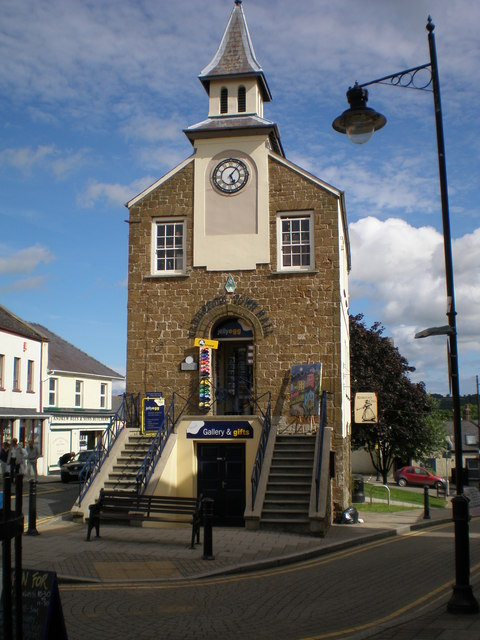
- Narberth Town Hall

- Shown in Pembrokeshire
- 51.7982°N 4.7434°W
- Location: High Street, Narberth

History
- Built: 1833

Site notes
- Architect: William Owen
- Architectural style: Neoclassical style

Listed Building – Grade II
- Official name: Town Hall
- Designated: 17 May 1988
- Reference no.: 6481

Narberth Town Hall (Welsh: Neuadd y Dref Arberth) is a municipal building in the High Street, Narberth, Pembrokeshire, Wales. The structure, which is currently used as a shop, is a Grade II listed building.

== History ==
The building was commissioned as a combined lock-up and courthouse. The site that the civic officials selected was occupied by a water tank from where the local people collected their water. It was designed in the neoclassical style, built in rubble masonry using stone from a quarry at Robeston Wathen and was completed in around 1833.

The design involved a symmetrical main frontage with three bays facing north up the High Street; it featured two flights of steps, on either side of the central bay, providing access to a round-headed doorway on the first floor. The building was remodelled to a design by the county surveyor, William Owen, with slightly projecting voussoirs, in 1845. Internally, the principal rooms were the lock-up on the ground floor and the courtroom on the first floor.

During the Rebecca Riots, in which rioting farmers and agricultural workers, often dressed as women, undertook protests, an attack on a new workhouse in the town took place and the rioters were subsequently incarcerated in the lock-up in 1839.

By the mid-19th century the building had become dilapidated and the magistrates vacated the courtroom on the first floor. The room was instead used as a mechanics' institute with a library and a reading room. A tower, with a clock designed and manufactured by J. W. Benson of Ludgate Hill and a pyramid-shaped roof surmounted by a bellcote, was added in 1881. Following significant population growth, largely associated with the status of Narberth as a market town, the area became an urban district in 1902. The new council adopted the mechanics' institute as its regular meeting place.

Visiting speakers at the mechanics institute included the suffragette, Emmeline Pankhurst, who addressed a crowd from the steps of the building in 1908. A second floor was added to the building to a design by George Thomas of Templeton in memory of a former president of the mechanics institute, Robert Ward, in 1912.

As the responsibilities of the urban district council increased, it became necessary to establish offices for the council officers and their departments at Bank House in St James Street. The building continued to serve as a meeting place and town hall for Narberth Urban District Council for much of the 20th century but ceased to be local seat of government when the enlarged South Pembrokeshire District Council was formed in 1974. Following an extensive programme of refurbishment works, carried out to a design by Wyn Jones of Haverfordwest, the building was re-opened in summer 1992, initially as a tourist information centre and later as a clothing shop.
