= Josephine Reynolds =

Welsh writer and firefighter (born 1965)

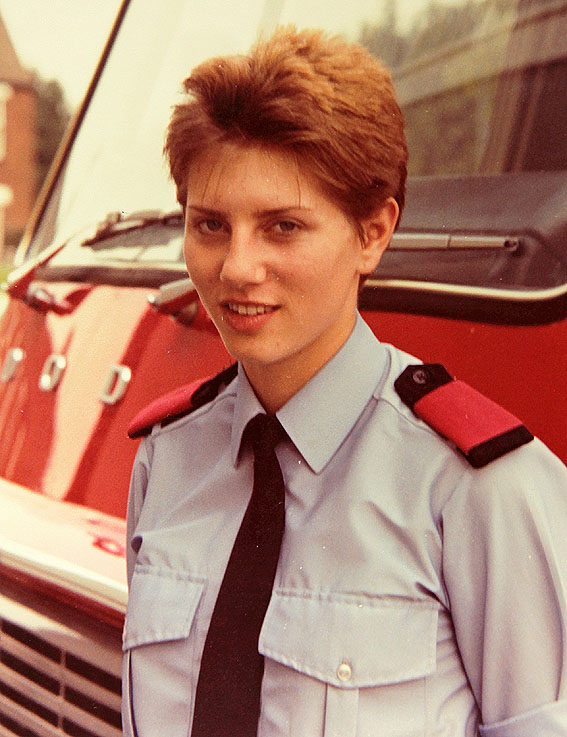
- Josephine Reynolds in September 1982
- Born: 28 March 1965; Narberth, Pembrokeshire, Wales
- Occupation(s): writer and former firefighter
- Notable work: Fire Woman: The Extraordinary Story of Britain's First Female Firefighter (2017)

Josephine Reynolds (born 28 March 1965) is a Welsh writer and former firefighter. She has been described as one of the first full-time female firefighters in the UK.

== Life ==
Reynolds grew up in Narberth, Pembrokeshire. When she was 12, her family home, where she lived with her mother, brother, and step-father, burned down. In 1981, at age 16, she left school and moved to Norfolk to live with her father.

In 1982 she was accepted on a new training scheme with the Norfolk Fire and Rescue Service aimed at school leavers. After a year of training, she began working with the fire and rescue service in Norfolk in 1983, aged 18. She worked at the fire station in Thetford. Three years later she qualified to drive a fire engine.

Reynolds married a fellow firefighter in December 1986. The following year, they both left to travel. Reynolds moved back to Norfolk in 1990, after the breakdown of her marriage. She later moved to China.

Reynolds published an autobiography, Fire Woman: The Extraordinary Story of Britain's First Female Firefighter, in 2017. As of 2017, Reynolds was retired and living in Cambodia.
