= Queen's Hall Narberth =

Performance venue in Narberth, Wales

Coordinates: 51.79941162°N 4.74428706°W

The Queen’s Hall Narberth
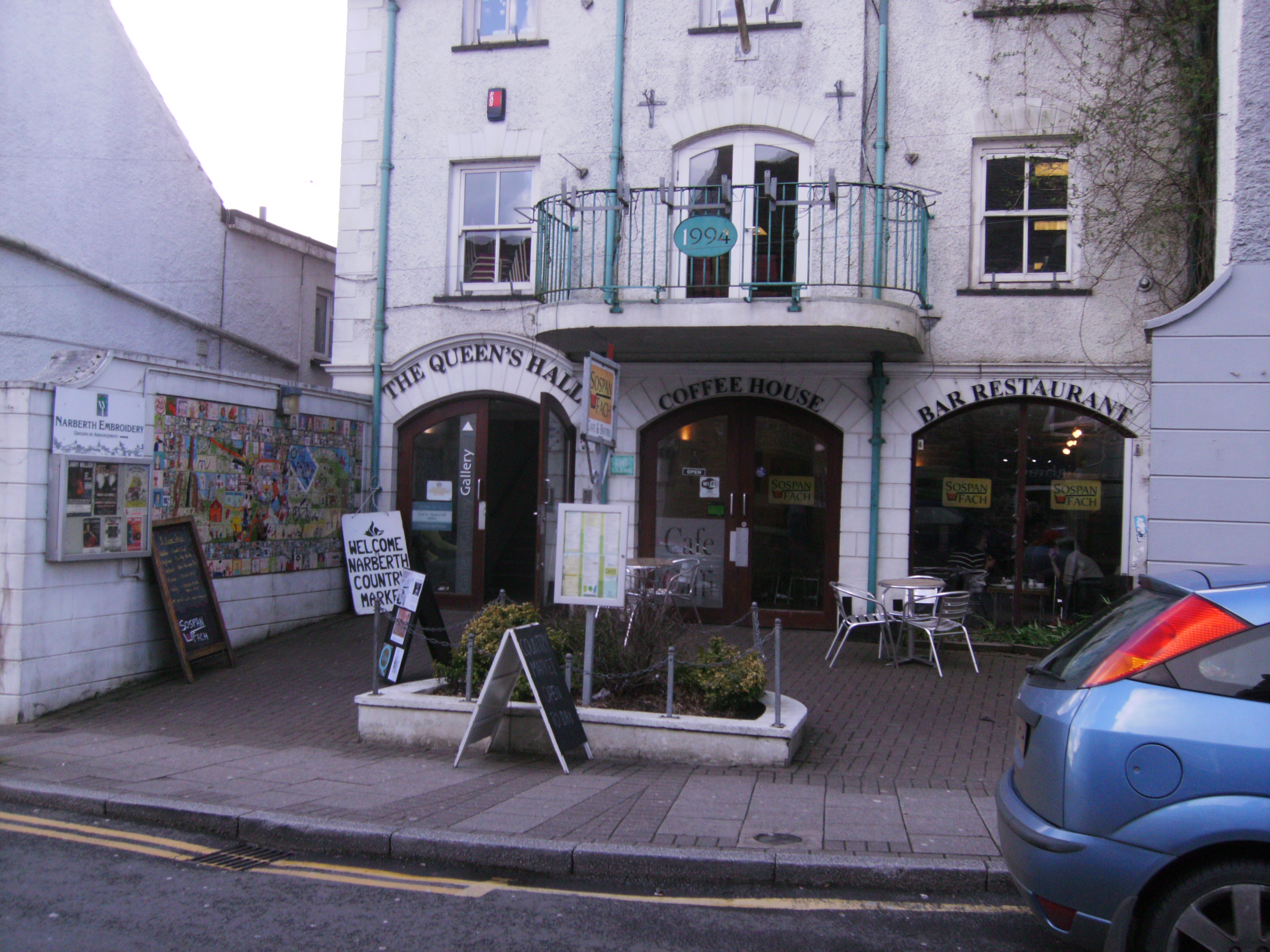
- The Queen’s Hall and Coffee House, Narberth
- Interactive map of The Queen’s Hall Narberth
- Former names: Victoria Cinema
- Address: 44 High Street, Narberth, Pembrokeshire, United Kingdom
- Capacity: 473 standing (271 sitting)
- Type: Music venue, Community hall

Construction
- Built: c.1912
- Opened: 1958 as The Queen’s Hall Narberth
- Renovated: 1994
- Architect: Ken Morgan (1994 renovation)

Website
- thequeenshall.org.uk

The Queen’s Hall Narberth is a live events venue and community hall in Pembrokeshire, Wales. In 1970, the venue hosted Elton John’s first performance in Wales.

== History and building ==
From 1912 to 1930, the building was a Cine-variety. From 1930 to 1947, it was the Victoria Cinema. In 1953, it was bought by the local community to become a community hall. The Queen’s Hall was opened on 1 Feb 1958 by the High Sheriff of Pembrokeshire, Joseph Edward Gibby.

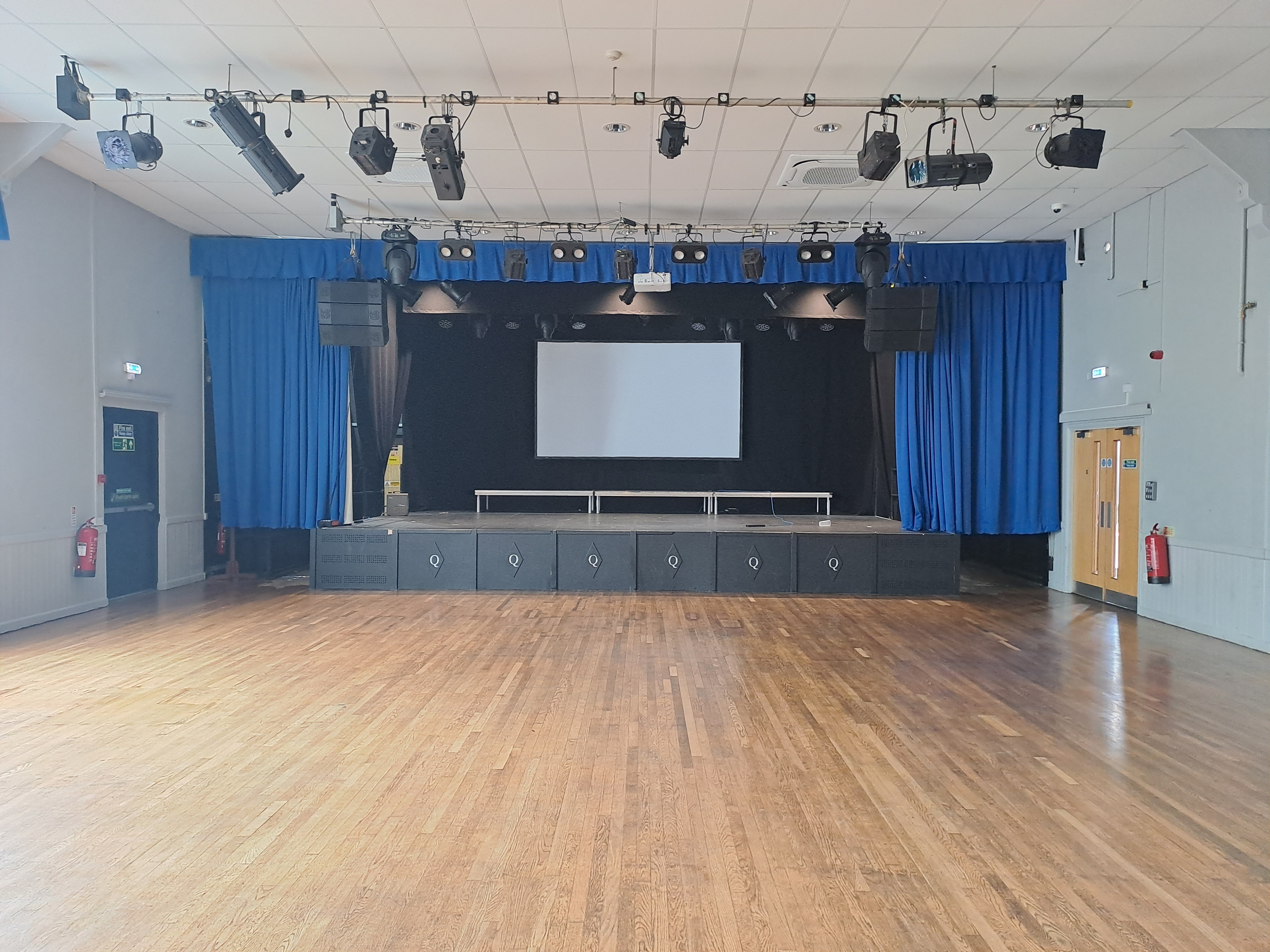
The main hall at Queen's Hall, Narberth

It is a registered charity and run by a board of trustees. It comprises a café, five meeting rooms and a main hall with a standing capacity of 473. It hosts music performances, comedy, films, markets and community events.

== Music ==
In the late 1960s, a fundraising initiative by Ivor Badham for Narberth A.F.C. “ended up as a stream of up-and-coming bands” heading to the hall playing to crowds of up to 1,000 people (pre-health and safety laws). The revenue from the gigs meant Narberth A.F.C. was able to build a brand-new football stadium.

Performers in the late 1960s and 1970s included: Deep Purple (13 September 1969), Elton John (13 June, 1970), Status Quo (22 November 1969), Desmond Dekker (1969), Hot Chocolate (26 December 1969), Chicken Shack, Simon Dupree and the Big Sound (17 August 1968), Dave Dee, Dozy, Beaky, Mick & Tich (22 June 1968), Dr. Feelgood, Alan Price, Wishbone Ash, Freddie and the Dreamers, The Mindbenders, Average White Band, Amen Corner, Love Affair (27 July 1968), The Move (15 April 1968), The Animals, The Tremeloes, Herman’s Hermits, Gerry and the Pacemakers, The Who, Small Faces, The Dave Clark Five, The Hollies, The Moody Blues, The Lovin' Spoonful, Long John Baldry, The Troggs, Manfred Mann, The Kinks, The Swinging Blue Jeans, Wayne Fontana, The Fourmost, The Honeycombs, Billy J. Kramer, Crispian St. Peters, PJ Proby, Cat Stevens, Dave Berry (9 March 1968), Leapy Lee, Thunderclap Newman (16 August 1969), Marmalade (7 April 1969) and The Equals (26 April 1969).

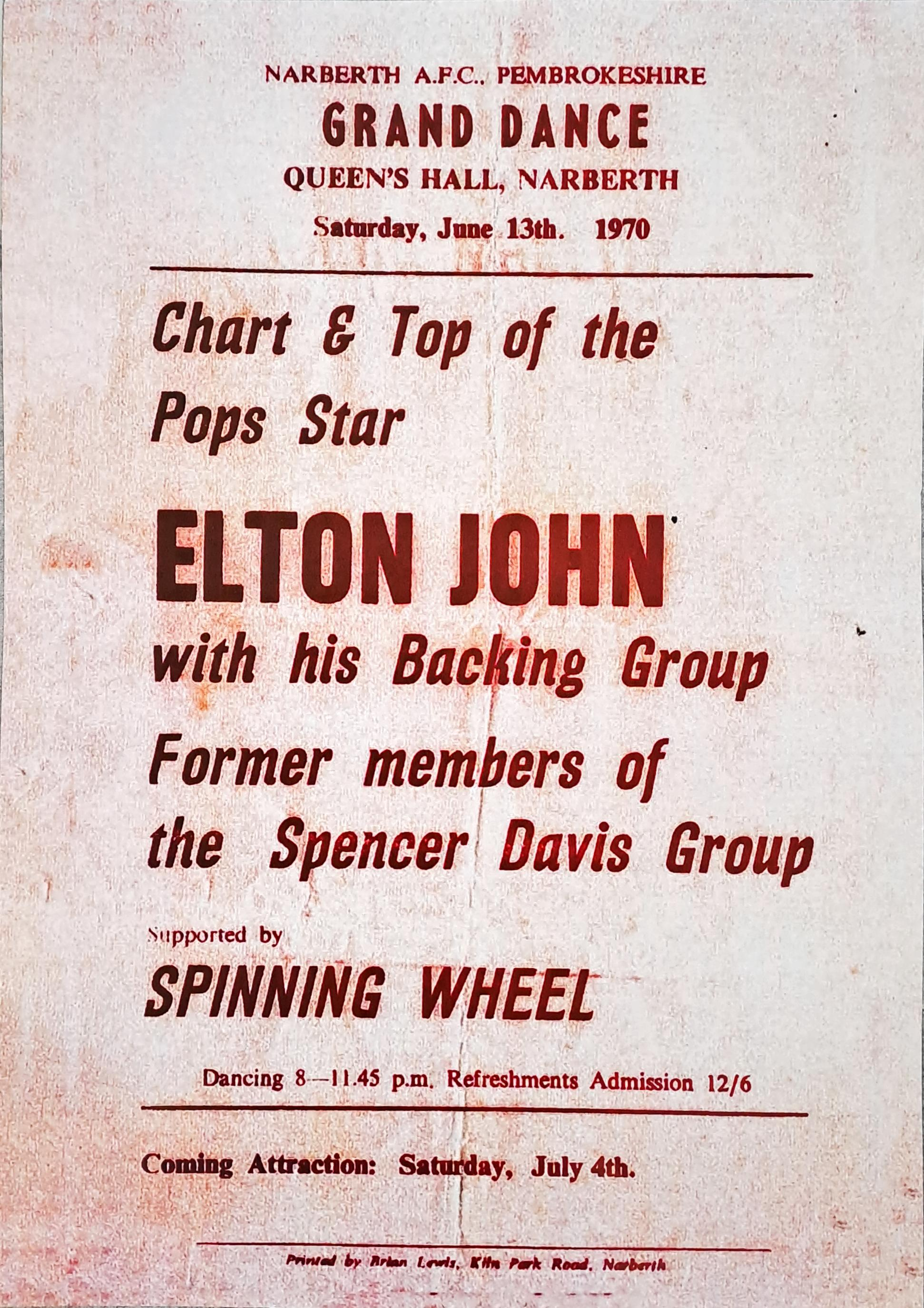
Elton John's 1970 performance at Queen's Hall, Narberth

More recent acts have included: David Gray (1999), All About Eve (2001), Therapy? (2006), Sandi Thom (2006), Gruff Rhys (2007), Sophie Ellis-Bextor (2008), The Damned (2008), Ronnie Scott’s All Stars (2016), Arrested Development (2021), Feeder (11 March 2022) and Gun (2023).

== Recent history ==
In 1994 the hall underwent major refurbishment and in 2020 it won £3,100 of National Lottery funding to create an archive and permanent exhibition about its musical heritage. In 2017 the Queen’s Hall won the Live Entertainment Venue of the Year award in the Welsh Hospitality Awards. In 2023 it received £1,717 in funding from Music Venue Trust to soundproof its windows.
