= Manorbier Castle =

Castle in Pembrokeshire, Wales

- Part of Pembrokeshire
- Manorbier, Wales
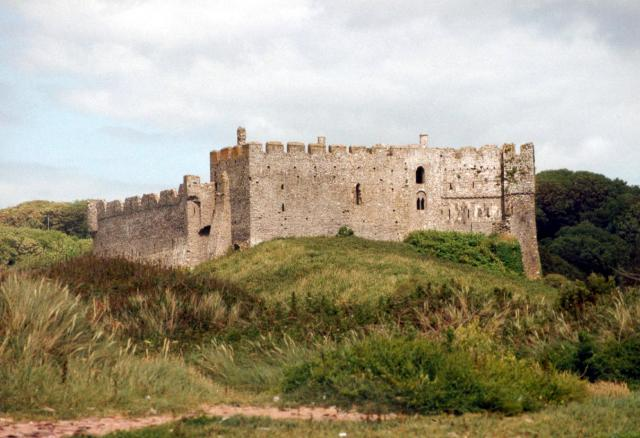
- The castle stands right on the coast just above the beach.

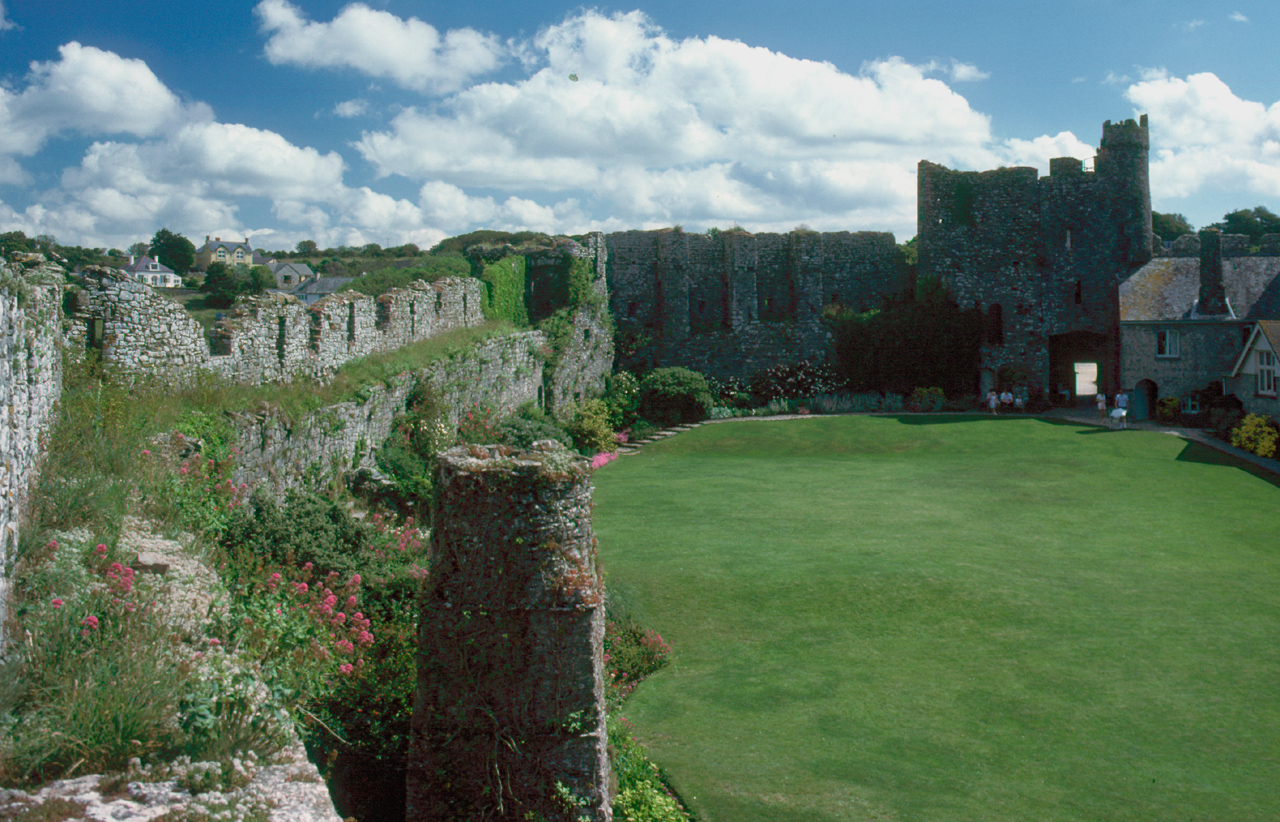
- The inner ward of the castle.

Site information
- Type: Norman Rectangular castle
- Owner: Private
- Open to the public: Yes
- Condition: Partially restored

Location
- Coordinates: 51°38′44″N 4°47′59″W
- Height: Up to 16 metres (52 ft)

Site history
- Built: 12th Century
- Built by: William de Barri
- Materials: Limestone

Listed Building – Grade I

Manorbier Castle (Welsh: Castell Maenorbŷr) is a Norman castle in Manorbier, 5 miles (8.0 km) southwest of Tenby, Wales. It was founded in the late 11th century by the Anglo-Norman de Barry family. The castle was part of a mesne lordship under the control of the medieval Earls of Pembroke.

== Construction ==
Manorbier enclosure castle has curtain walls and round and square towers. Standing on a natural coastal promontory with no external moat, the main entrance to the inner ward is a tower gateway with a portcullis, a roof, embrasures and a heavy iron/wood door. A postern gate provided access to the beach and the sea. The southeast tower is round; the northeast is angular. The castle's domestic ranges, which were completed in the 1140s, included kitchens, apartments and a Great hall. Windows replaced the arrowslits in the domestic range. A chapel with elaborate vaulting and plaster-work was built c. 1260. Some of the original medieval frescoes survive.

Earthworks completed an outer ward. There was no barbican. A bridge across a neck ditch linked the inner and outer wards.

== History ==
The land was granted to Odo de Barri, a Norman knight, at the end of the 11th century. Initially, he constructed a motte-and-bailey castle on the site which had a wooden keep defended by a palisade and earthworks embankments. In the early part of the 12th century, William de Barri, Odo's son, used locally quarried Limestone to strengthen the fortification.

In 1146 Gerald of Wales, the great 12th-century scholar known as Geraldus Cambrensis was born at the castle. He was the fourth and youngest son of William de Barri, who was related on his mother's side, to the legendary Welsh princess Nest ferch Rhys. Gerald wrote of his birthplace:

"In all the broad lands of Wales, Manorbier is the most pleasant place by far."

In the castle's history, it was only attacked twice; both were minor skirmishes. In 1327, Richard de Barri assaulted Manorbier in a dispute over family succession. Then 300 years later during the English Civil War, the castle was seized in 1645 by Parliamentarian forces. It was then slighted to prevent further military use by the Royalists.

Through the 17th and 18th centuries, Manorbier fell into decay. However, in 1880 the castle was partially restored by J.R.Cobb, a tenant who carried out repairs to the buildings and walls.

== Present day ==
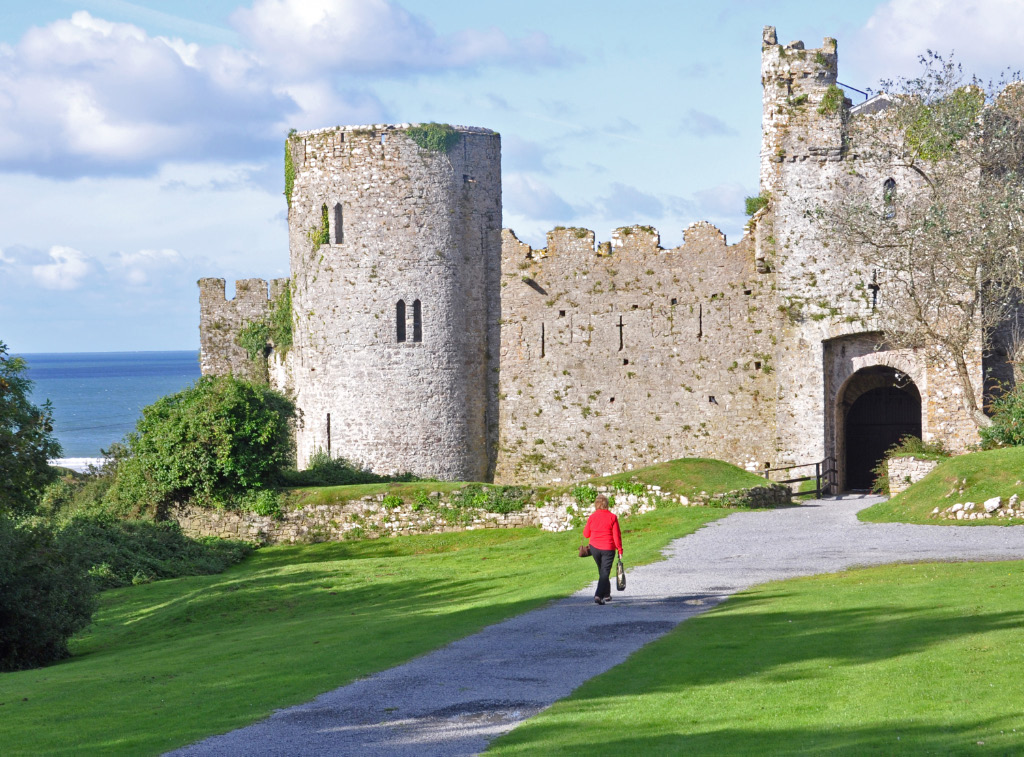
Viewed from the northeast

The privately owned castle is open to the public together with the gardens, the dovecote and the mill. The castle is a wedding venue and part has been converted into a holiday cottage.

== Gallery ==
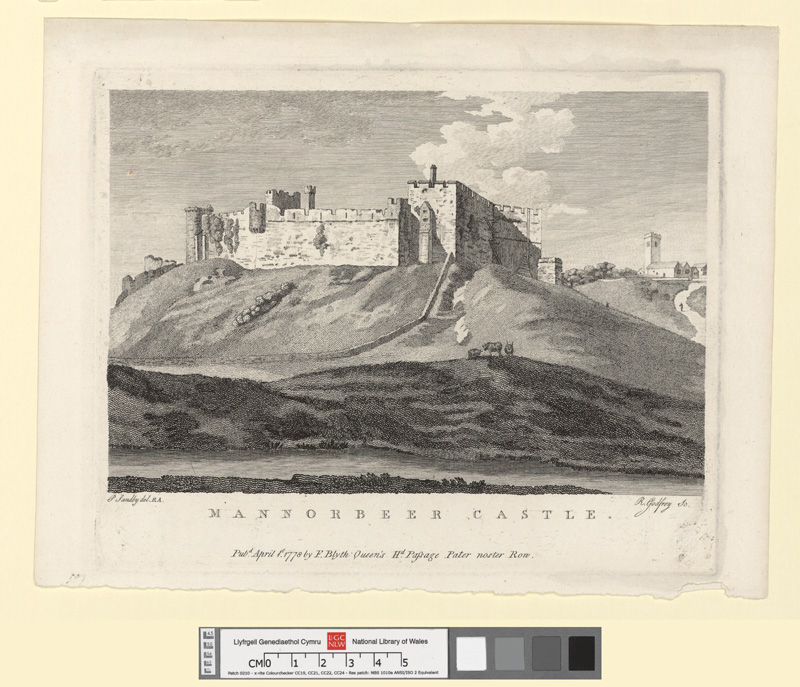
April 1778

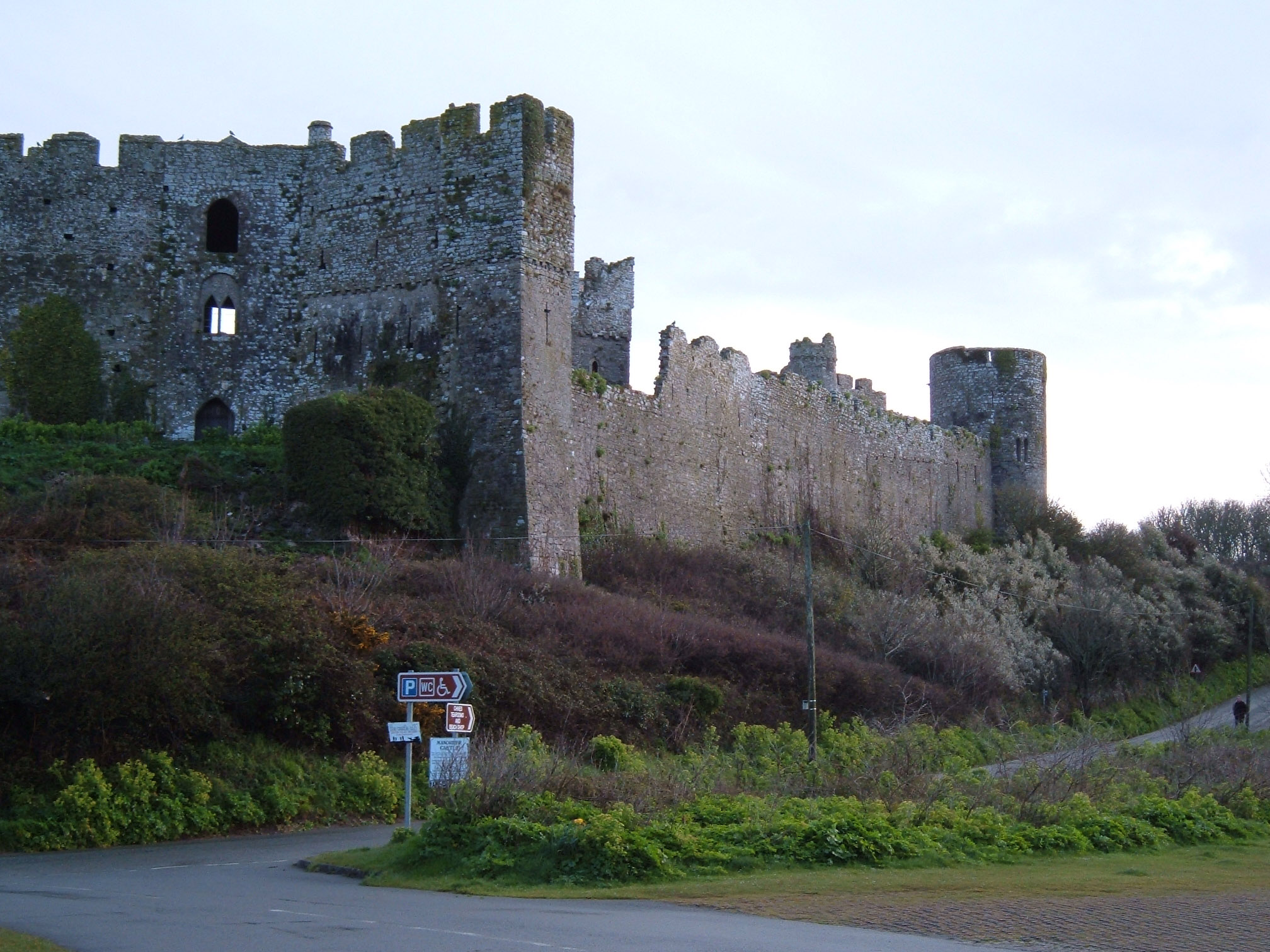
The postern gate (centre left) is in the curtain wall beneath the castle towers

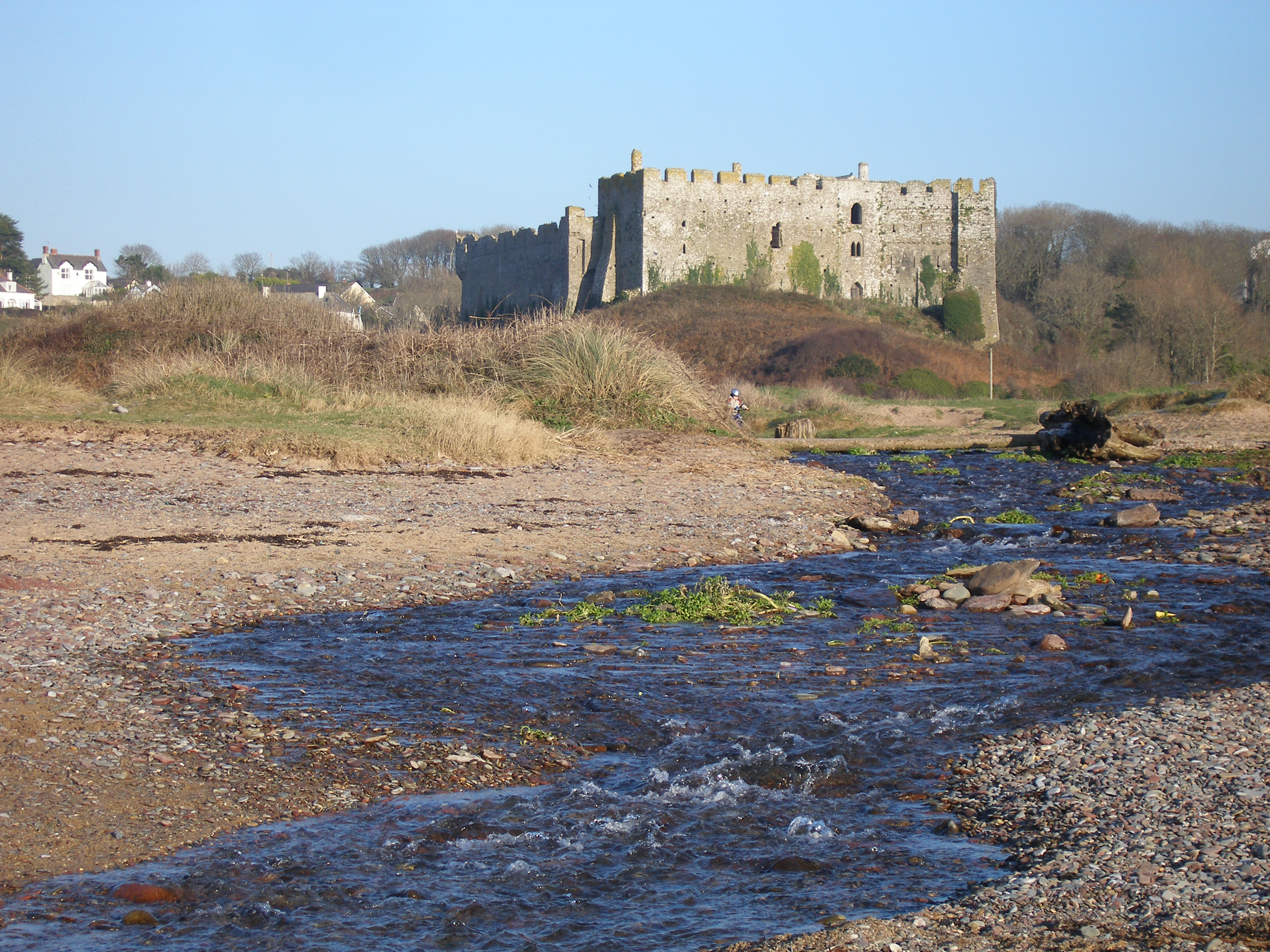
The castle's living range was at the rear of the fortification

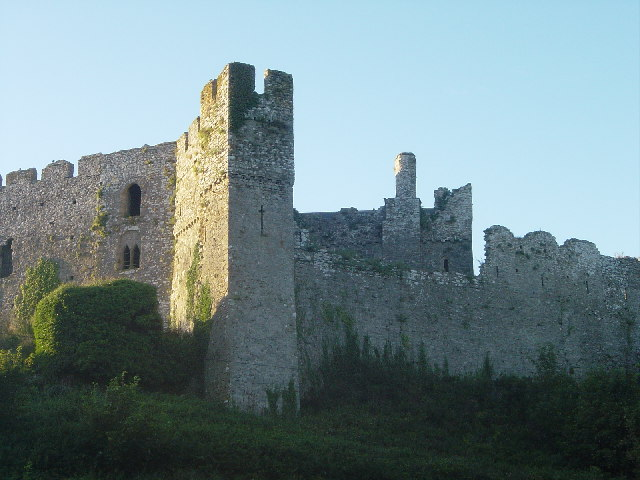
The square tower and buttresses

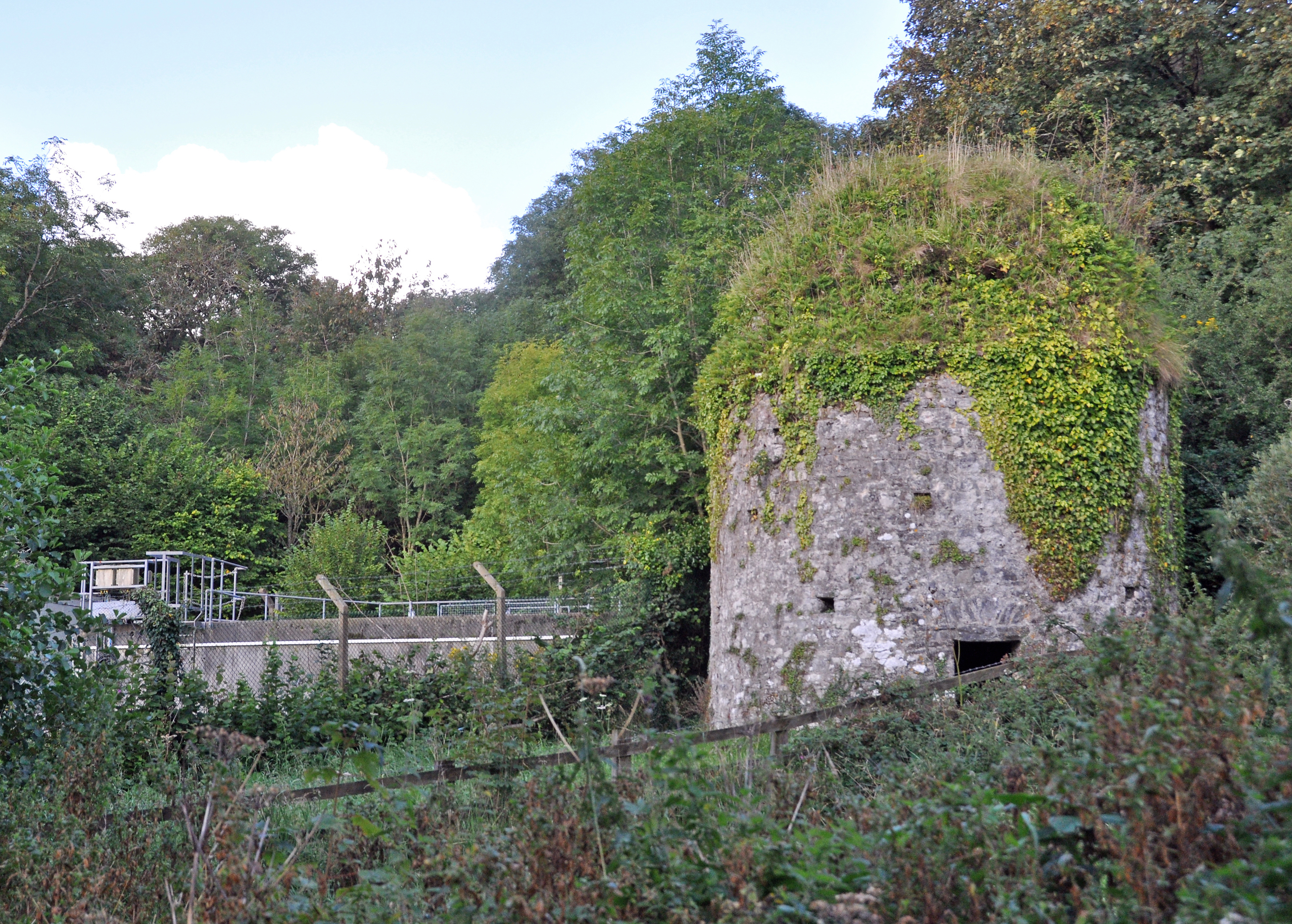
Manorbier castle dovecote
