= Blackpool Mill =

Listed building in Martletwy, Pembrokeshire, Wales

Coordinates: 51°47′43″N 4°48′53″W

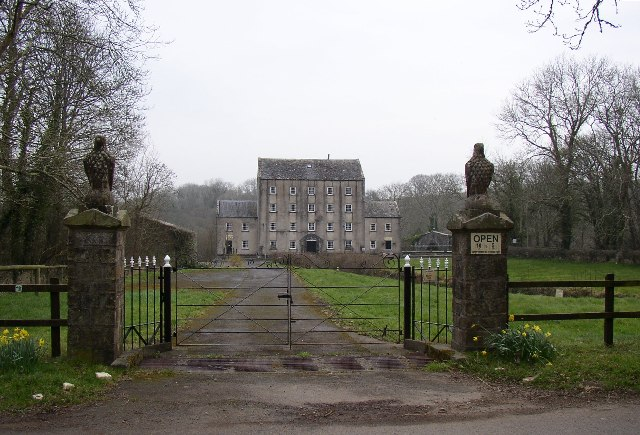
Blackpool Mill (2005)

Blackpool Mill is a 19th century flour mill in the community of Martletwy, in the Pembrokeshire Coast National Park. It sits to the west of Blackpool Bridge on the southern bank of the Eastern River Cleddau, downstream from Canaston Bridge. Built in 1813 on the site of former ironworks, the mill is a Grade-II* listed building, which is intact and contains working machinery, but has ceased commercial operation. Blackpool Mill is listed by RCAHMW as an historic place name.

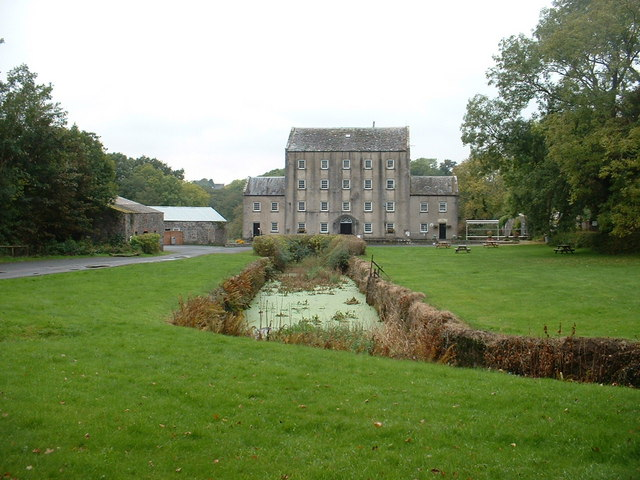
The mill race (2007)

The mill was originally powered by a centre water wheel, 4.5 metres (15 ft) in diameter and 3.5 metres (11 ft) wide. A turbine replaced the wheel about 1900, driving four pairs of stones. The mill remained in use until 1958; the drive was converted to electricity. In 1968, renovations enabled the building to be opened to the public. Currently, the mill is closed to the public but features in the Narberth to Blackpool Mill Walk.

Several other features of the site are listed by Coflein: Blackpool bridge, a furnace, the mill leat and the wharf.

== Bluestone ==
In 2016, Bluestone, a nearby holiday resort, announced plans to spend £2.5 million restoring the site with the addition of a miniature railway as a tourist attraction, but following objections from the National Park, the plans were deferred by Bluestone, and subsequently rejected, with Bluestone invited to re-apply. In 2020, Bluestone was granted planning permission to convert the mill into a 160-seat restaurant.
