= Oakwood Theme Park =

Former amusement park in Wales

- Previously known as Oakwood Leisure Park; Oakwood Coaster Country; Oakwood Park
- Interactive map of Oakwood Theme Park
- Location: Canaston Bridge, Narberth, Wales
- Coordinates: 51.778°N 4.807°W
- Status: Defunct
- Opened: 14 April 1987; 39 years ago
- Closed: 4 March 2025
- Owner: Aspro Parks
- Slogan: "Wales' biggest family day out!"
- Operating season: Late March/early April to early November

Attractions
- Total: 30
- Roller coasters: 5
- Water rides: 4
- Other rides: 17

Oakwood Theme Park (formerly Oakwood Leisure Park, Oakwood Coaster Country and Oakwood Park) was an amusement park located in Pembrokeshire, Wales.

Oakwood Theme Park opened on 14 April 1987 as a small family-owned park with minimal attractions. The park later began to incorporate larger thrill rides, including Megafobia, which has been praised by coaster enthusiasts, Vertigo, Drenched (originally Hydro), and Speed: No Limits, which opened as the steepest coaster in the United Kingdom.

On 4 March 2025, it was announced that the park would permanently cease operations after four decades, citing "challenges presented by the current business environment", and a decline in financial performance "making further investment unsustainable".

== History ==
Until March 2008, Oakwood Leisure Ltd. was owned and developed by the McNamara family, Pembrokeshire farmland owners who diversified into the leisure industry in 1987 after the introduction of milk quotas. The park took twelve months to research.

A 15 in (381 mm) gauge narrow-gauge railway opened at the park in 1987, providing a transport link between the amusement park and the car park. The park also included BMX courses, a wooden play fort, a 3D cinema show, and go-karts.

Following an increase in visitor numbers after the installation of the Snake River Falls water slide in 1994, management decided to pursue the development of the park into a more thrilling park. In 1996, the park installed a wooden roller coaster built by Custom Coasters International at a cost of £1.7 million. The coaster, Megafobia, boosted the park's attendance to 500,000 visitors in one season for the first time in the park's history. In 1996, Oakwood also began an annual After Dark event, with late-night opening, fireworks, entertainment, and discounted evening entry.

Several major additions would follow in the coming years. In 1997, the park purchased Vertigo, a Skycoaster. Bounce, a drop tower, opened in 1999. Hydro (later Drenched), a shoot the chute, was installed in 2002, followed by Speed: No Limits, a steel roller coaster, in 2006.

The only themed area in the park began as the wild west-themed "Jake's Town". In 2000, the area was rethemed as "New Orleans" with the opening of a new dark ride, Voodoo Mansion. Several of the other rides in the section were rethemed to match the new theme during this time as well.

The park was sold to Aspro Parks of Spain in March 2008. The New Orleans area was reverted to a wild west theme in 2012. Later that year, the park announced that it was entering a five-year investment plan, beginning with the redevelopment of the Kidz World section into Neverland for the 2013 season. This redevelopment was completed, and opened to the public on 23 May 2013. A second themed children's area, "Circus Land", was also introduced in 2013.

A themed soundtrack was introduced in 2018, produced by Nick Hutson, including songs for the park itself, the After Dark event, and Megafobia.

On 4 March 2025, it was announced that Oakwood Theme Park would permanently cease operations. Dismantling and removal of the rides and attractions commenced soon afterward.

Speed: No Limits was relocated to the amusement park Walygator Sud-Ouest in Agen, France, which is also owned by Aspro Parks.

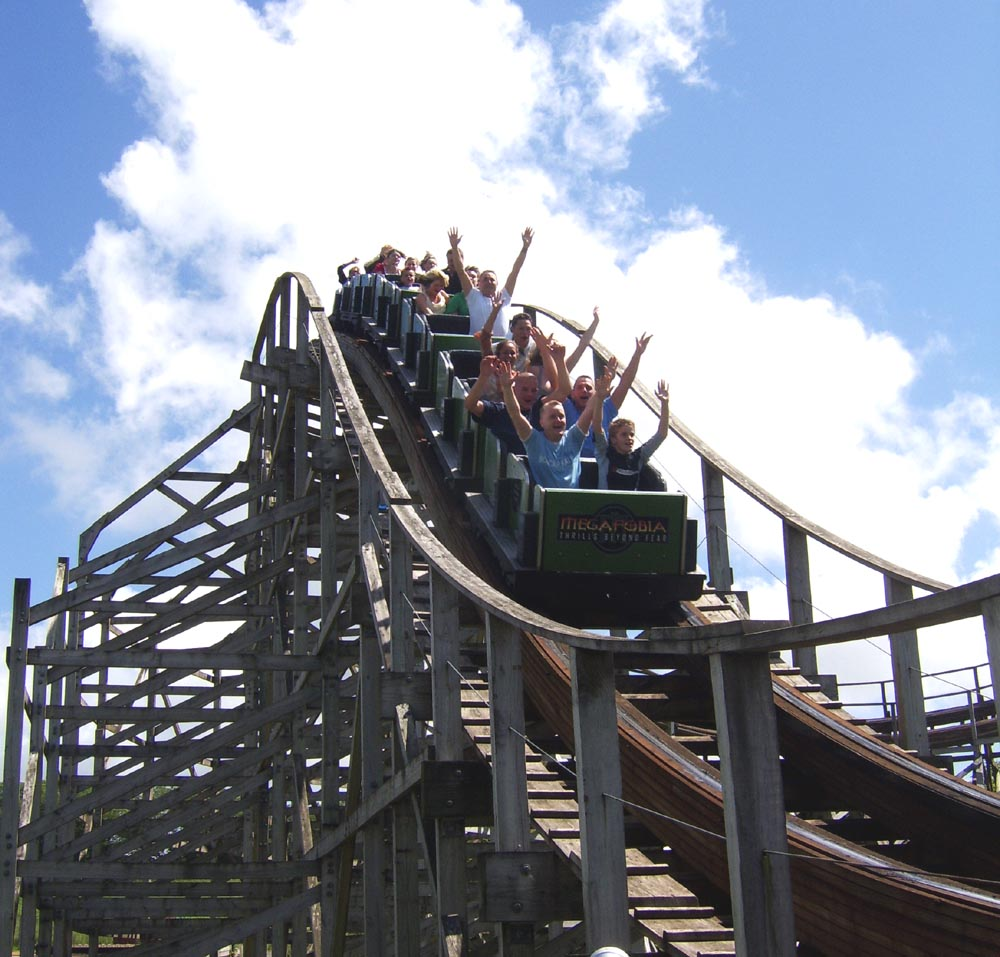
Megafobia

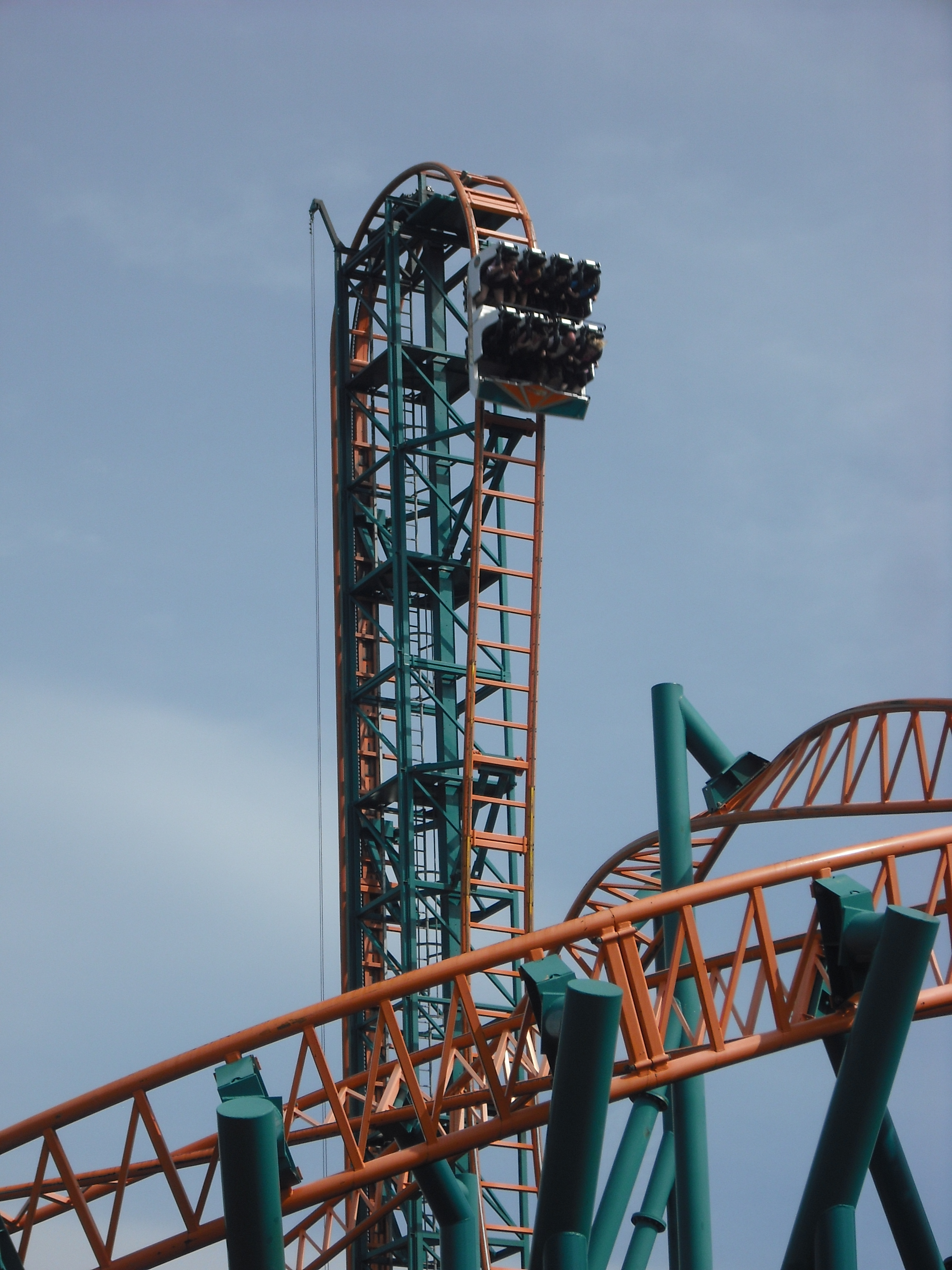
Speed: No Limits' first drop

== Former rides and attractions ==
=== Roller coasters present at park closure ===
Ride	Opened	Manufacturer	Description
Creepy Crawler	1 August 2017	Pinfari	Originally located at M&D's under the names Cobra (1998–2001), Express (2003–2004), and Space Coaster (2006–2015). In 2017, it was moved to Oakwood Theme Park and renamed Flight of the Giant Peach, as part of the new Dahl Land section. In 2018, the theming was removed and it was renamed to Creepy Crawler in the Spooky Street section.
Crocodile Coaster	25 May 2013	Manorplan Leisure	A steel powered kiddie coaster located in the park's Neverland section. Originally located at Camelot Theme Park as Junior Dragon Coaster (1992–2012).
Megafobia	30 April 1996	Custom Coasters International	A wooden roller coaster with a twister-style layout. The ride received a retrack by The Gravity Group during 2023, which also reprofiled some parts of the ride.
Speed: No Limits	13 April 2006	Gerstlauer	A steel Euro-Fighter that held the title of the world's steepest roller coaster between April 2006 and July 2008. It was the United Kingdom's first roller coaster with a beyond vertical drop, and the first of its ride model to open in the United Kingdom. It has since been relocated to Walygator Sud-Ouest.
Treetops Rollercoaster	1989	Zierer	A steel kiddie coaster with a figure-eight layout. It has since been relocated to Walygator Grand-Est.

=== Water rides present at park closure ===
Ride	Opened	Manufacturer	Description
Skull Rock	2013	Big Country Motioneering	A partially-enclosed log flume located in the park's Neverland section.
Snake River Falls	1994	WhiteWater West	A set of four raft slides themed to snakes.
Waterfall	1987	Bailey Rides	A set of two toboggan water slides.

=== Flat rides present at park closure ===
Ride	Opened	Manufacturer	Description
Dizzy Disk	2019	DINIS Amusement Equipment	A spinning Disk'O-style ride that replaced the previous Circus World section.
Pirate Ship	1991	HUSS Park Attractions	A swinging pirate ship ride.
Tink's Flying School	2004	Larson International	A Flying Scooters ride located in the park's Neverland section. Was called Plane Crazy until 2013.

=== Other rides present at park closure ===
Ride	Opened	Manufacturer	Description
Bobsleigh	14 April 1987	Unknown	A toboggan ride.
Main Line Train	14 April 1987	Severn Lamb	A narrow-gauge railway that provided a transport link between the amusement park and the car park.
Vertigo	1997	Sky Fun 1 Inc.	A Skycoaster with a maximum height of 50 metres (164 ft).

=== Children's rides present at park closure ===
Ride	Opened	Manufacturer	Description
Aerodrome	1992	Zierer	A spinning Junior Jets ride, specifically of the Kiddi Roundabout model, located in the park's Neverland section.
Jolly Roger	2013	Manorplan Leisure	A junior pirate ship ride located in the park's Neverland section.
Neverland Chase	1995	Manorplan Leisure	A track ride seating 2 guests per car, located in the park's Neverland section.
The Sights of London	1992	Zamperla	A track ride seating 4 guests per car, located in the park's Neverland section.
Witches' Brew	2014	I.E. Park	A junior teacups ride that previously operated at Camelot Theme Park. Located in the Spooky Street section.

=== Past attractions ===
Name	Opened	Closed	Manufacturer	Description
Nutty Jake's Gold Mine	14 April 1987	2013	Imagination, Rex Studios	A tracked dark ride. In its original iteration, Nutty Jake's Gold Mine, which lasted until 1999, riders were taken through a gold-mine themed tunnel in the Jake's Town section. In a retheme done by Rex Studios, the ride was transformed into Brer Rabbit's Burrow in 2001, which took the riders through Brer Rabbit's burrow.
Spooky 3D	2000	2022	Rex Studios	A tracked dark ride with 3D UV effects in which guests wear 3D glasses. In 2023, the ride was closed, pending a retheme. It originally opened as Voodoo Mansion, and was rethemed to Spooky 3D in 2003. Located in the Spooky Street section.
Cine 180	14 April 1987	2000	Unknown	A 3D cinema.
Go Karts	14 April 1987	2001	Unknown	A go-kart track.
Junior Go Karts	14 April 1987	2001	Unknown	A smaller go-kart track intended for young children.
Assault Course	1991	1998	Unknown	An assault course.
Jake's Music Hall	1991	1999	Sparks Creative	A puppet show. The building was reused for Spooky 3D.
Circus Clown	1997	2018	Pinfari	A steel powered kiddie coaster. Located in the Circus Land section, and closed along with the rest of the section at the end of 2018. It was relocated to Camel Creek Adventure Park, where it reopened in 2019.
Moon Landing	Unknown	2022	Unknown	A vertical slide previously known as Sky Leap.
Drenched	1 June 2002	2022	Intamin	Originally opened as Hydro. A shoot the chute ride, specifically of the Mega Splash model. It was one of only three built, and was the last one remaining at the time of its closure.
Bounce	1999	2024	HUSS Park Attractions	A drop tower ride, specifically of the Shot'n'Drop model, reaching heights of 45 metres (147 ft). The ride closed in 2016 and reopened in 2022 following a refurbishment.

== Incidents ==
=== Hydro ===
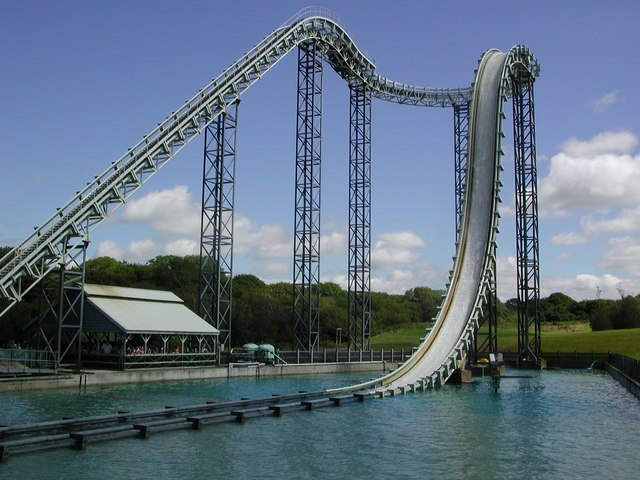
Drenched (formerly Hydro)

On 15 April 2004, 16-year-old Hayley Williams died after falling approximately 30.4 metres (100 ft) from the top of the ride. The incident was attributed to human error, as CCTV footage showed that staff had not properly checked to ensure the rider's restraint was secure. Following the accident, the ride was closed for the remainder of the season, and later reopened with more secure over-the-shoulder restraints, replacing the original lap bars.

A 2006 coroner's inquest returned a narrative verdict, indicating that the accident was primarily due to the restraints being improperly secured by staff, rather than being fundamentally unsafe. CCTV evidence showed that the victim’s lap bar was in an “open and unsafe position” and that ride operators failed to adequately check passengers' restraints.

On 18 May 2007, the Health and Safety Executive (HSE) announced that Oakwood Theme Park would be prosecuted. In February 2008, Oakwood Theme Park was charged with failing to ensure that guests were safely restrained. The case was heard at Swansea Crown Court on 7 July 2008, where the park pleaded guilty to breaching the Health and Safety at Work etc. Act 1974. On 18 December 2008, the park was fined £250,000 plus £80,000 in legal costs. High Court Judge Justice Lloyd-Jones noted that safety breaches at the park had created “the potential for really serious injury to very large numbers of people”.

=== Treetops ===
On 23 October 2022, a rider was ejected from one of the rearmost carriages of the ride. The park was evacuated and closed whilst the HSE investigated with Dyfed-Powys Police. The HSE determined there had been no fault with the ride, and declared no further action was necessary. The rider's injuries were stated to be non-life threatening.

=== Bounce ===
On 10 July 2024, the drop tower ride Bounce came to a sudden stop, described by park management as a "programmed emergency stop procedure”. Around eight people received first aid treatment on site, while six others visited hospital for further treatment.

== See also ==
- Tourism in Wales
