= Narberth, Pembrokeshire =

Town and community in Pembrokeshire, Wales

Narberth: Welsh: Arberth
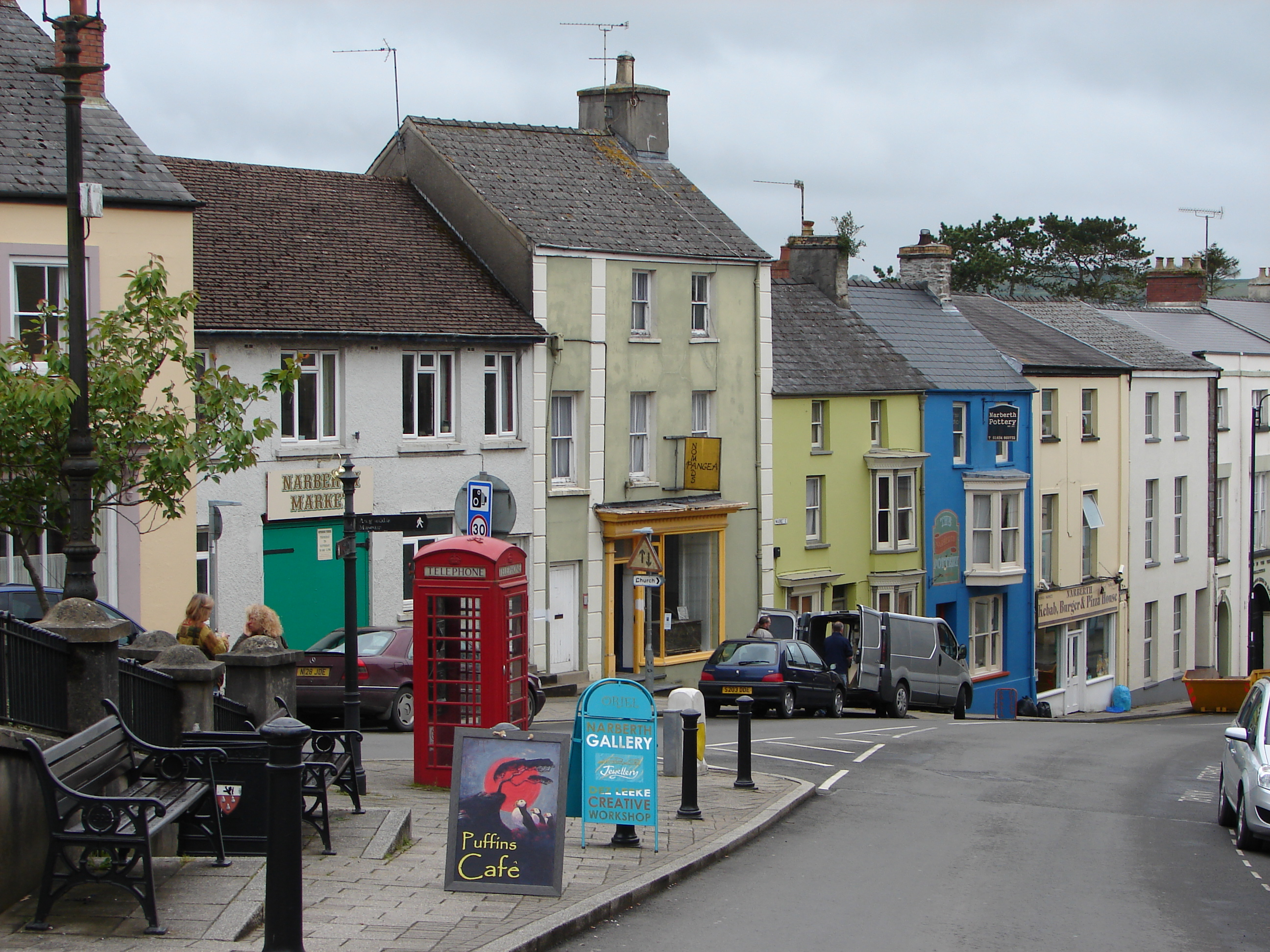

- Location within Pembrokeshire
- Population: 4,100 (2021)
- OS grid reference: SN110147
- Community: Narberth
- Principal area: Pembrokeshire
- Preserved county: Dyfed
- Country: Wales
- Sovereign state: United Kingdom
- Post town: NARBERTH
- Postcode district: SA67
- Dialling code: 01834
- Police: Dyfed-Powys
- Fire: Mid and West Wales
- Ambulance: Welsh
- UK Parliament: Mid and South Pembrokeshire
- Senedd Cymru – Welsh Parliament: Ceredigion Penfro
- List of places UK Wales Pembrokeshire 51.7989°N 04.7423°W Map of the community

Narberth (Welsh: Arberth) is a town and community in Pembrokeshire, Wales. It was founded around a Welsh court and later became a Norman stronghold on the Landsker Line. It became the headquarters of the hundred of Narberth. It was once a marcher borough. George Owen described it in 1603 as one of nine Pembrokeshire "boroughs in decay".

In 2021, the population of both wards (rural and urban) was 4,100 (rounded to the nearest 100),19.6% of whom are Welsh-speaking. Narberth is close to the A40 trunk road and is on the A478. Narberth railway station is on the main line from Swansea. The community includes the village of Crinow.

== Toponymy ==
The Welsh name of the town, Arberth, is a compound of ar "on, against" + perth "hedge" (cf. Perth in Scotland). The phrase yn Arberth "in Narberth" was rebracketed when borrowed into English, giving the present-day English name, Narberth.

== History ==
In the Iron Age, there was a defended enclosure to the south of the current town centre on Camp Hill. Narberth was founded around a Welsh court, but later became a Norman stronghold on the Landsker Line. It became the headquarters of the hundred of Narberth. It was once a marcher borough. George Owen described it in 1603 as one of nine Pembrokeshire "boroughs in decay". There is a First World War memorial in Market Square with further inscriptions added after the Second World War.

=== Mythology ===
The town plays a high-profile role in Welsh mythology, where it is the chief palace of Pwyll, Prince of Dyfed, and a key setting in both the first and third branches of the Mabinogi. A drama specially adapted for children based on the story of Culhwch and Olwen from the Mabinogion was staged at Narberth Castle when it was reopened to the public in 2005.

== Facilities and attractions ==
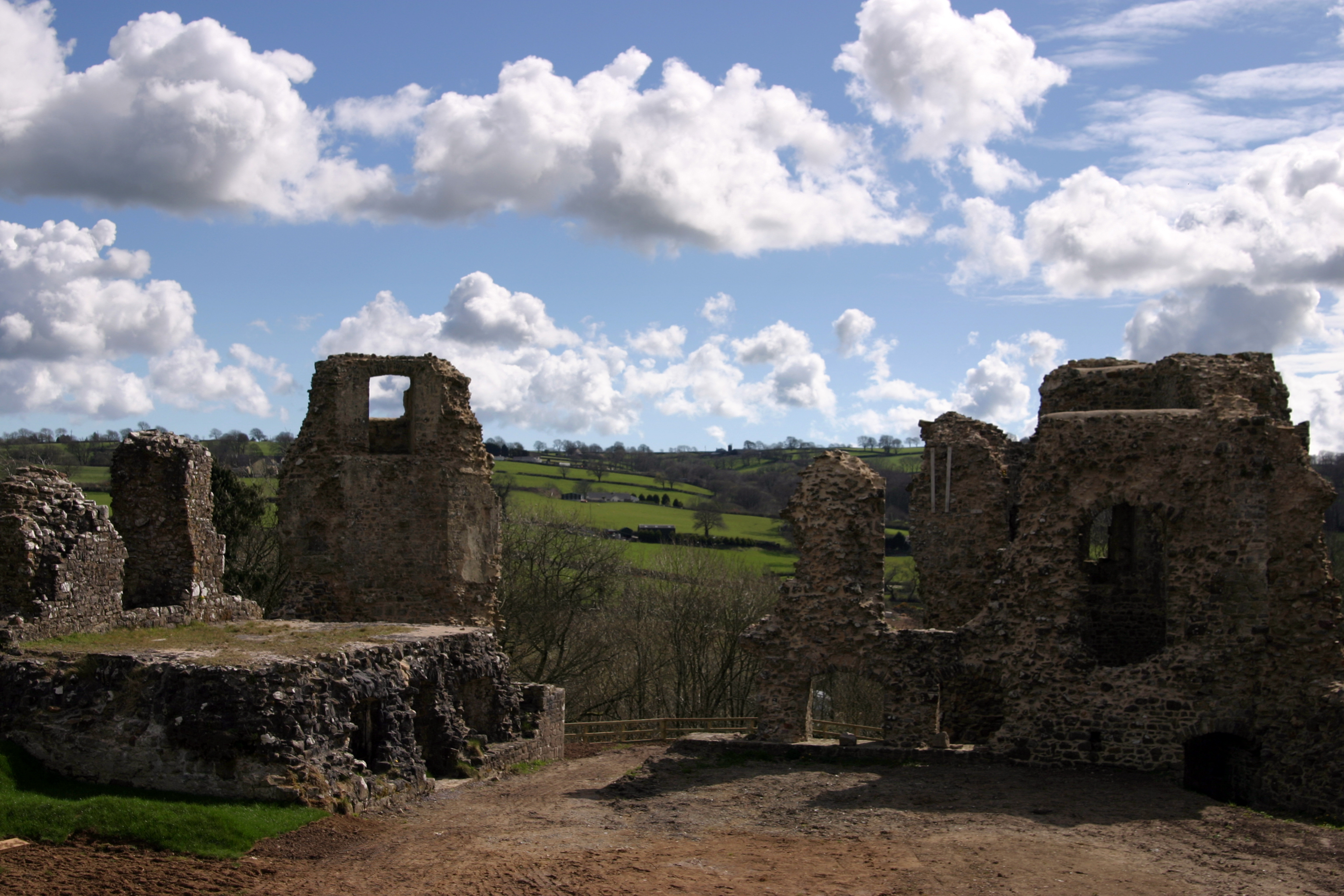
Narberth Castle ruins, 2005

Attractions in the town include several art galleries, the Narberth Museum, Narberth Town Hall, which still houses the cell where the leaders of the Rebecca Riots were imprisoned, and a ruined castle. Narberth has a range of independent shops, including a Daily Telegraph sponsored 'Best Traditional Business', national award-winning butcher, women's boutiques and gift shops, and has developed a reputation as an antiques centre. In 2014, The Guardian called it "not only a gastronomic hub for west Wales but also one of the liveliest, most likeable little towns in the UK".

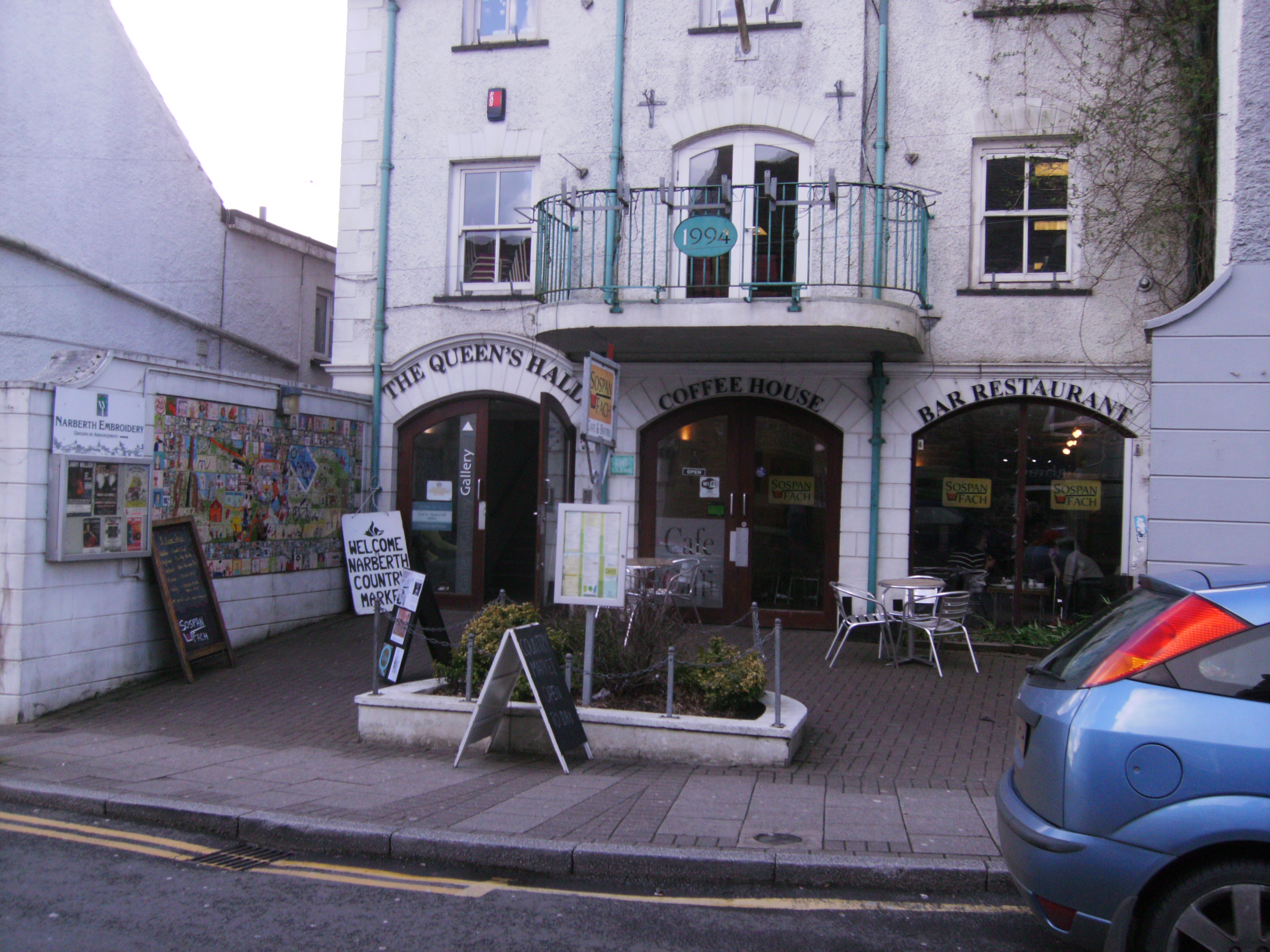
The Queen's Hall

The town's cultural and arts centre, the Queen's Hall Narberth was where Elton John played his first Welsh gig in 1970. The venue has hosted bands including Deep Purple, Status Quo, Desmond Dekker, Hot Chocolate, Dave Dee, Dozy, Beaky, Mick & Tich, Therapy? and The Blockheads. Concerts, plays and classes, such as Kung Fu, yoga and line dancing are held there. It also has a contemporary art gallery and restaurant.

The Bloomfield House Community Centre, a Community association and a registered charity is in Narberth. Other attractions near to Narberth include Blackpool Mill, at the highest tidal reach of the River Cleddau, where Eurasian otters and other wildlife may be seen, and Oakwood Theme Park.

Narberth was named one of the best places to live in Wales in 2017.

There are 70 listed buildings in Narberth.

== Demographics ==
Narberth was recorded as having a population of roughly 4,100. Of this, 35.6% were between the ages of 50 and 74, below the county average of 36.3%. The largest ethnic group in Narberth is White who make up 97.1% of the population, below the county average of 97.6%, with the second largest being Asian/Asian British with 1.3%, above the county average of 0.9%. The largest religious group in Narberth is No religion with 47% of the population, above the county average of 43%, with the second largest being Christian with 46.1% of the population, below the county average of 48.8%.

== Events ==
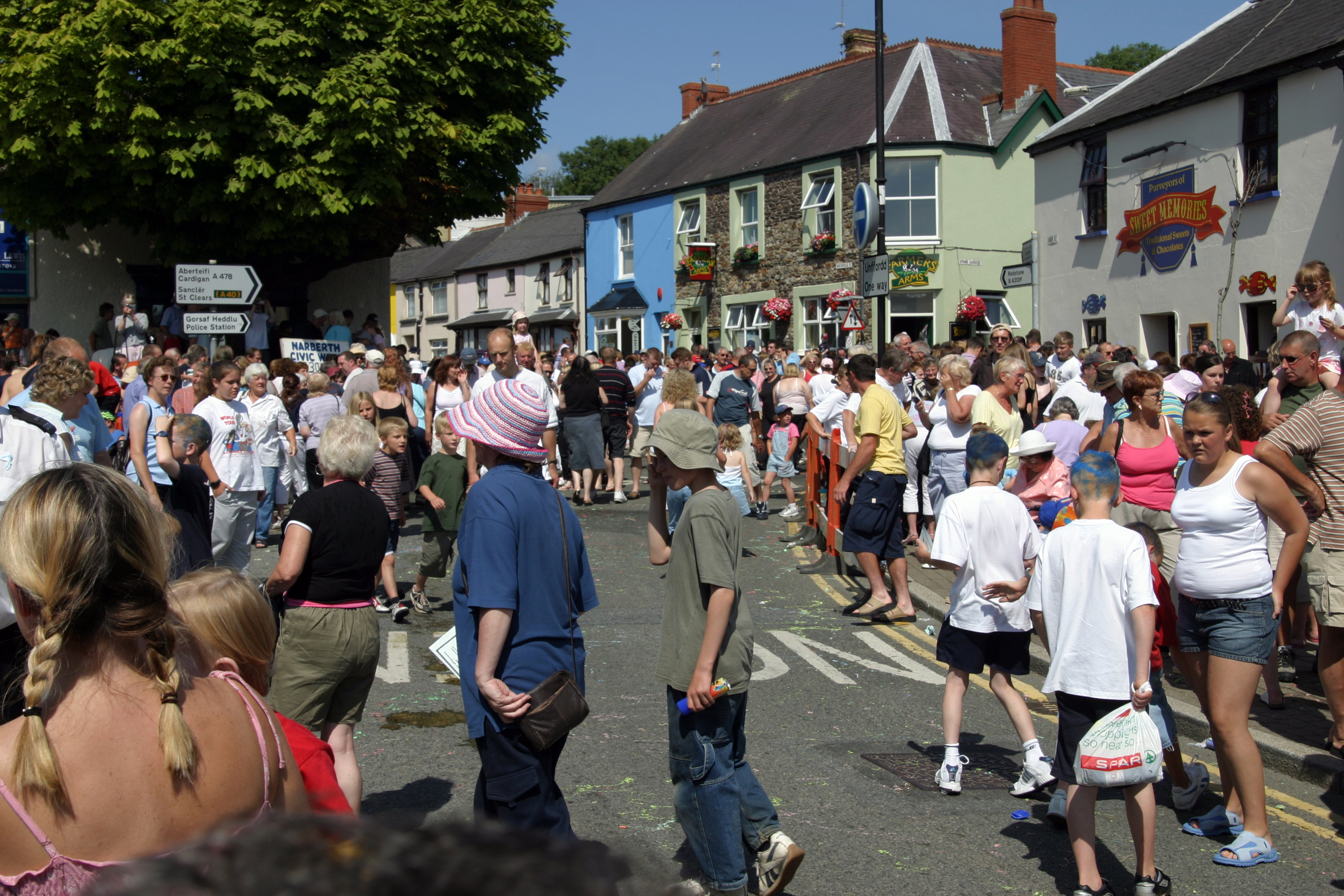
Carnival day

Narberth Food Festival has taken place on the fourth weekend of September every year since 1998. The festival features celebrity chefs, cookery demonstrations, music, entertainment and children's activities.

Narberth Civic Week is held during the last full week of July and includes a parade through the town to one of the churches, where a service is held to welcome the newly appointed Mayor. In 2008, the Civic Service was held in the grounds of Narberth Castle for the first time. During Civic Week, there are various activities arranged for children, families and visitors to the town. The culmination of Civic Week is the annual Carnival Day Parade, a tradition dating back over 100 years. Narberth's Winter Carnival, held in December, was revived in 2009, after a break of 4 years.

The town is also home to the Narberth A Cappella Voice Festival, which began in 2008 and is described as Wales' only a cappella festival. It celebrated its tenth anniversary in May 2018.

== Governance ==
Narberth is in the Mid and South Pembrokeshire UK Parliament constituency and the Carmarthen West and South Pembrokeshire Senedd constituency.

Narberth elects a Town Council, which in turn elects a mayor annually. The 2025–2026 mayor is Cllr. Charlie Meredydd, succeeding Cllr. Chris Walters. His Mayoress is Cllr. Glinys Meredydd, and the deputy mayor is Cllr. Elizabeth Rogers.

A county councillor is elected to Pembrokeshire County Council every five years from each of Narberth's two local government wards, Narberth (town) and Narberth Rural. In the May 2017 election, independent candidate Elwyn Morse was elected unopposed as county councillor for Narberth Rural.

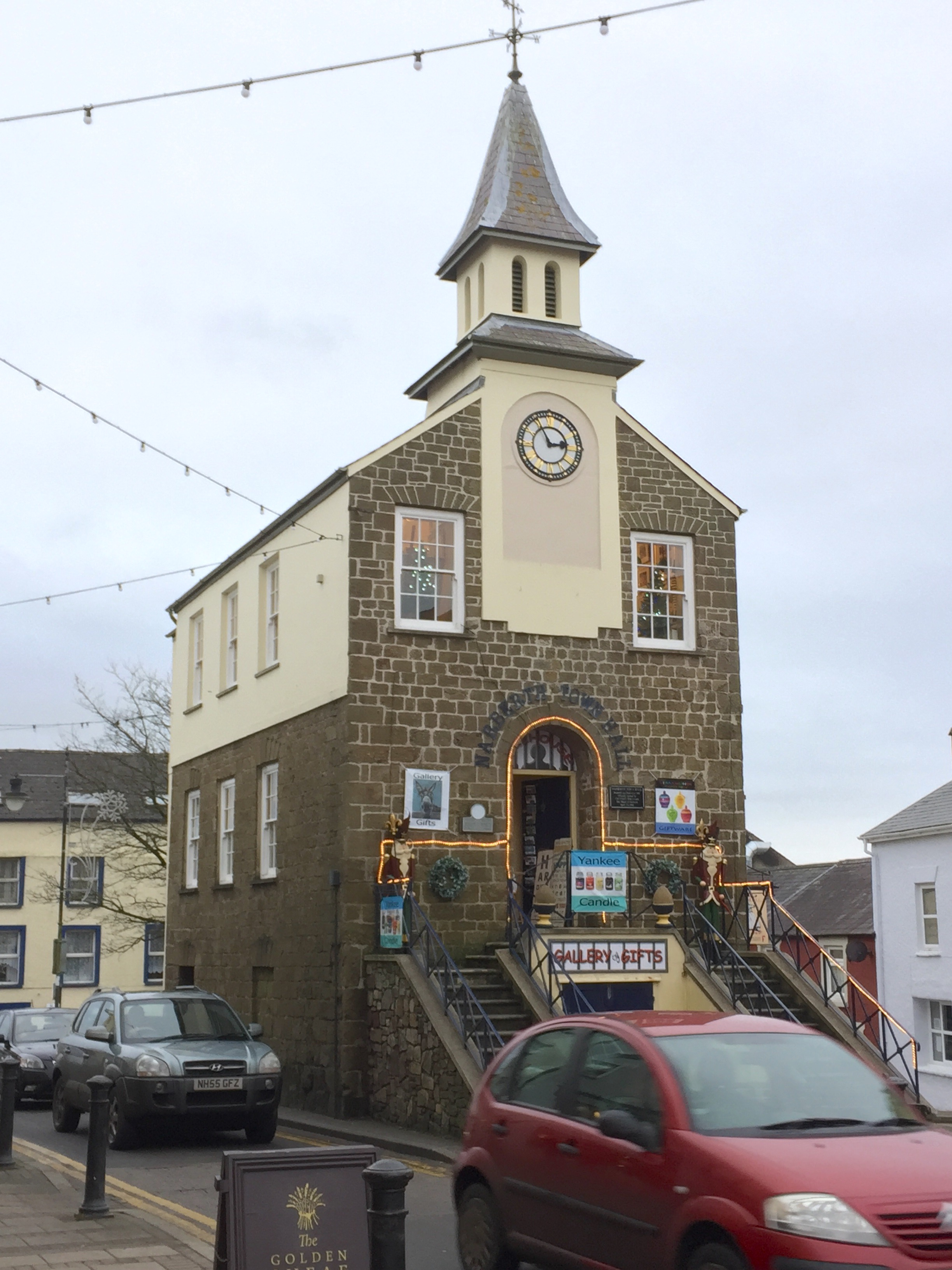
Narberth Town Hall

=== Administrative history ===
The ancient parish of Narberth had split into two civil parishes by the nineteenth century, called Narberth North (which included the built up area of the town itself) and Narberth South (where the main settlement was Templeton). When parish and district councils were established in 1894 both Narberth North and Narberth South parishes were included in the Narberth Rural District. Narberth Urban District was created on 1 April 1902, covering a new civil parish called Narberth which was created from part of the Narberth North parish. Narberth South and the reduced Narberth North parish stayed in the Narberth Rural District.

Narberth Urban District Council met at Narberth Town Hall in the High Street. By 1958 the council had also established its main offices at Bank House at 6 St James Street.

Narberth Urban District was abolished under the Local Government Act 1972, merging with other nearby districts to become South Pembrokeshire on 1 April 1974. South Pembrokeshire in turn was abolished in 1996 to become part of a re-established Pembrokeshire.

== Transport ==
Buses are run by First Cymru. Services run to Haverfordwest, Carmarthen and Tenby.

The station Narberth has services run by Transport for Wales. Services run to Pembroke Dock or Swansea running at an every 2 hour frequency in each direction.

== Notable people ==
- Sir Thomas Foley (1757–1833), born in Llawhaden, near Narberth. A contemporary of Lord Nelson, he was a senior naval officer at the battles of the Nile and Copenhagen.
- Sir William Howell Davies (1851–1932), leather merchant and Liberal politician.
- Wyn Calvin (1925–2022), a Welsh comedian, pantomime dame, TV and theatre actor
- Josephine Reynolds (born 1965), an early full-time female firefighter, born in Narberth
- Jodie Marie (born 1991), a Welsh singer-songwriter

=== Sport ===
- Abel Davies (1861–1914), a Welsh international rugby union winger
- John Dyke (1884–1960), a Wales international rugby union fullback.
- Joe Allen (born 1990), footballer, was raised and educated in the town.
- Josh Helps (born 1994), retired Welsh rugby union player

== Twinning ==
Narberth is twinned with Ludlow in Shropshire, England and both towns celebrate an annual food festival.

== Sport ==
Narberth is home to several sporting teams, including Narberth Rugby Football Club who currently play in the Welsh Championship, Narberth Football Club, and a cricket club.
