= List of city and town halls in Wales =

This is a list of city and town halls in Wales. The list is sortable by building age and height and provides a link to the listing description where relevant. The list, which was compiled using the list of 1,000 Largest Cities and Towns in the UK by Population, published by The Geographist, to ensure completeness, includes over 70 surviving buildings. The oldest town hall is Llantwit Major Town Hall, thought to have been completed in around 1490. The tallest town hall is Cardiff City Hall which has a dome which rises to 194 feet (59 m).

Town or city	Building	Image	Principal area	Built	Height	Notes
Aberaeron	Aberaeron Town Hall; Neuadd y Dref Aberaeron	More images	Ceredigion	1846		Grade II listed (10040). Architect: Edward Haycock.
Aberdare	Old Town Hall, Aberdare; Hen Neuadd y Dref Aberdare	More images	Rhondda Cynon Taf	1831		Grade II listed (10855).
Abergavenny	Abergavenny Town Hall; Neuadd y Dref Y Fenni	More images	Monmouthshire	1871		Grade II listed (2416). Architects: Wilson and Willcox.
Aberystwyth	Aberystwyth Town Hall; Neuadd y Dref Aberystwyth	More images	Ceredigion	1962		Architects: Sidney Colwyn Foulkes.
Ammanford	Ammanford Town Hall; Neuadd y Dref Rhydaman	More images	Carmarthenshire	1964		Architect: W. H. Lock-Smith.
Bala	Bala Town Hall; Neuadd y Dref Y Bala	More images	Gwynedd	1800		Grade II listed (4916).
Bangor	Bangor Town Hall; Neuadd y Dref Bangor	More images	Gwynedd	1546		Grade II listed (3951).
Bargoed	Bargoed Town Hall; Neuadd y Dref Bargod	More images	Caerphilly	1911		Grade II listed (26493). Architect: George Kenshole.
Barry	Barry Town Hall; Neuadd y Dref Y Barri	More images	Vale of Glamorgan	1908		Grade II listed (13404). Architects: Charles E. Hutchinson and E. Harding Payne of London.
Beaumaris	Beaumaris Town Hall; Neuadd y Dref Biwmares	More images	Anglesey	1785		Grade II listed (5589).
Blaenau Ffestiniog	Blaenau Ffestiniog Town Hall; Neuadd y Dref Blaenau Ffestiniog	More images	Gwynedd	1864		Grade II listed (70483). Architect: Owen Morris of Porthmadog.
Blaenavon	Municipal Offices, Blaenavon; Swyddfeydd Bwrdeistrefol Blaenafon	More images	Torfaen	1930		Grade II listed (15278). Architect: John Morgan.
Brecon	Brecon Guildhall; Neuadd y Dref Aberhonddu	More images	Powys	1771		Grade II listed (6908).
Buckley	Buckley Town Council Offices; Swyddfeydd Cyngor Tref Bwcle	More images	Flintshire	1901		Grade II listed (87599). Architect: Richard Cecil Davies.
Caerphilly	Twyn Community Centre; Canolfan Gymunedol Twyn	More images	Caerphilly	1791		
Caerwys	Caerwys Town Hall; Neuadd y Dref Caerwys	More images	Flintshire	1885		
Cardiff	Cardiff City Hall; Neuadd y Ddinas Caerdydd	More images	Cardiff	1906	59 metres (194 ft)	Grade I listed (13744). Architects: Lanchester, Stewart and Rickards of London.
Cardigan	Cardigan Guildhall; Neuadd y Dref Aberteifi	More images	Ceredigion	1860		Grade II* listed (10479). Architect: Robert Jewell Withers.
Carmarthen	Carmarthen Guildhall; Neuadd y Dref Caerfyrddin	More images	Carmarthenshire	1777		Grade I listed (9450). Architect: Sir Robert Taylor.
Colwyn Bay	Colwyn Bay Town Hall; Neuadd y Dref Bae Colwyn	More images	Conwy	1907		Grade II listed (14707). Architect: Walter Wiles.
Conwy	Conwy Guildhall; Neuadd y Dref Conwy	More images	Conwy	1863		Grade II listed (3251).
Cowbridge	Cowbridge Town Hall; Neuadd y Dref Y Bont-faen	More images	Vale of Glamorgan	1806		Grade II* listed (13200).
Criccieth	Old Town Hall, Criccieth; Hen Neuadd y Dref Cricieth	More images	Gwynedd	1795		
Crickhowell	Crickhowell Town Hall; Neuadd y Dref Crucywel	More images	Powys	1834		Grade II listed (6377). Architect: Thomas Henry Wyatt.
Denbigh	Denbigh Town Hall; Neuadd y Dref Denbigh	More images	Denbighshire	1917		Grade II* listed (23591). Architect: Charles Ernest Elcock.
Fishguard	Fishguard Town Hall; Neuadd y Dref Abergwaun	More images	Pembrokeshire	1830		Grade II listed (12316).
Flint	Flint Town Hall; Neuadd y Dref Y Fflint	More images	Flintshire	1840		Grade II listed (14891). Architect: John Welch.
Grosmont	Grosmont Town Hall; Neuadd y Dref Y Grysmwnt	More images	Monmouthshire	1832		Grade II listed (2757).
Hay-on-Wye	Hay-on-Wye Town Hall; Neuadd y Dref Y Gelli Gandryll	More images	Powys	1835		Grade II listed (7393).
Holyhead	Holyhead Town Hall; Neuadd y Dref Caergybi	More images	Anglesey	1875		Architect: John Thomas.
Holywell	Holywell Town Hall; Neuadd y Dref Treffynnon	More images	Flintshire	1896		Grade II listed (447). Architect: Richard Lloyd Williams.
Kenfig	Kenfig Town Hall; Neuadd y Dref Cynffig	More images	Bridgend	1808		Grade II listed (11219).
Kidwelly	Kidwelly Town Hall; Neuadd y Dref Cydweli	More images	Carmarthenshire	1878		Grade II listed (11880). Architect: Thomas William Angel Evans.
Lampeter	Lampeter Town Hall; Neuadd y Dref Llanbedr Pont Steffan	More images	Ceredigion	1881		Grade II listed (10439). Architect: Robert Jewell Withers.
Laugharne	Laugharne Town Hall; Neuadd y Dref Talacharn	More images	Carmarthenshire	1747		Grade II* listed (9659).
Llandovery	Llandovery Town Hall; Neuadd y Dref Llanymddyfri	More images	Carmarthenshire	1858		Grade II listed (11003). Architect: Richard Kyrke Penson.
Llandrindod Wells	Old Town Hall, Llandrindod Wells; Hen Neuadd y Dref Llandrindod	More images	Powys	1872		Grade II listed (87569).
Llandudno	Llandudno Town Hall; Neuadd y Dref Llandudno	More images	Conwy	1902		Grade II listed (5809). Architect: Thomas Ball Silcock.
Llanelli	Llanelli Town Hall; Neuadd y Dref Llanelli	More images	Carmarthenshire	1896		Grade II listed (11962). Architect: Williams Griffiths
Llangefni	Llangefni Town Hall; Neuadd y Dref Llangefni	More images	Anglesey	1884		Grade II listed (5738).
Llangollen	Llangollen Town Hall; Neuadd y Dref Llangollen	More images	Denbighshire	1867		Grade II listed (1142). Architects: Lloyd Williams and Underwood.
Llanidloes	Llanidloes Town Hall; Neuadd y Dref Llanidloes	More images	Powys	1908		Grade II listed (8258). Architects: Frank Shayler and Thomas Ridge.
Llantrisant	Llantrisant Guildhall; Neuadd y Dref Llantrisant	More images	Rhondda Cynon Taf	1773		Grade II listed (23943).
Llantwit Major	Llantwit Major Town Hall; Neuadd y Dref Llanilltud Fawr	More images	Vale of Glamorgan	1490		Grade II* listed (13248).
Loughor	Old Town Hall, Loughor; Hen Neuadd y Dref Casllwchwr	More images	Swansea	1868		Grade II listed (11196). Architect: Henry Davies of Llanelli.
Maesteg	Maesteg Town Hall; Neuadd y Dref Maesteg	More images	Bridgend	1881		Grade II listed (18494). Architect: Henry Harris.
Merthyr Tydfil	Merthyr Tydfil Town Hall; Neuadd y Dref Merthyr Tudful	More images	Merthyr Tydfil	1898		Grade II listed (11444). Architect: Edwin Arthur Johnson.
Milford Haven	Milford Haven Town Hall; Neuadd y Dref Aberdaugleddau	More images	Pembrokeshire	1939		
Mold	Mold Town Hall; Neuadd y Dref Yr Wyddgrug	More images	Flintshire	1912		Grade II listed (364). Architect: Frederick Andrew Roberts.
Montgomery	Montgomery Town Hall; Neuadd y Dref Trefaldwyn	More images	Powys	1751		Grade II* listed (7974). Architect: William Baker of Audlem.
Mountain Ash	Mountain Ash Town Hall; Neuadd y Dref Aberpennar	More images	Rhondda Cynon Taf	1904		Grade II listed (80903). Architect: J. H. Phillips.
Narberth	Narberth Town Hall; Neuadd y Dref Arberth	More images	Pembrokeshire	1833		Grade II listed (6481). Architect: William Owen.
Neath	Neath Town Hall; Neuadd y Dref Castell-nedd	More images	Neath Port Talbot	1821		Grade II listed (11778). Architect: W. Bowen.
Newcastle Emlyn	Newcastle Emlyn Town Hall; Neuadd y Dref Castellnewydd Emlyn	More images	Carmarthenshire	1892		Grade II listed (9706). Architect: David Jenkins.
Newport	Newport Civic Centre; Canolfan Ddinesig Casnewydd	More images	Newport	1964	55 metres (180 ft)	Grade II* listed (22333). Architect: Thomas Cecil Howitt of Nottingham.
Pembroke	Pembroke Town Hall; Neuadd y Dref Penfro	More images	Pembrokeshire	1819		Grade II listed (6377).
Pontypool	Pontypool Town Hall; Neuadd y Dref Pont-y-pŵl	More images	Torfaen	1856		Grade II listed (3132). Architect: Bidlake and Lovett.
Pontypridd	Pontypridd Municipal Buildings; Adeiladau Bwrdeistrefol Pontypridd	More images	Rhondda Cynon Taf	1904		Grade II* listed (13532). Architect: Henry Hare.
Portmeirion	Portmeirion Town Hall (Note: Located in a private village, there is no council therefore the building is a town hall in name only, it is used as an events venue); Neuadd y Dref Portmeirion	More images	Gwynedd	1938		Grade I listed (4777). Architect: Sir Clough Williams-Ellis.
Presteigne	Presteigne Town Hall; Neuadd y Dref Llanandras	More images	Powys	1865		Grade II listed (8852). Architect: Thomas Nicholson.
Pwllheli	Pwllheli Town Hall; Neuadd Dwyfor	More images	Gwynedd	1902		Grade II listed (4566). Architect: Arthur James Dickinson.
Pwllheli	Old Town Hall, Pwllheli; Hen Neuadd y Dref Pwllheli	More images	Gwynedd	1820		Grade II listed (4562).
Rhyl	Rhyl Town Hall; Neuadd y Dref Rhyl	More images	Denbighshire	1876		Grade II listed (1498). Architect: Wood and Turner.
Ruthin	Ruthin Town Hall; Neuadd y Dref Rhuthun	More images	Denbighshire	1865		Grade II listed (875). Architects: J W Poundley and D Walker.
St Clears	St Clears Town Hall; Neuadd y Dref Sanclêr	More images	Carmarthenshire	1848		Grade II listed (25481). Architect: John Rogers.
St Davids	St Davids City Hall; Neuadd y Ddinas Tyddewi	More images	Pembrokeshire	1924		Architect: Frank Ingleton.
Swansea	Swansea Guildhall; Guildhall Abertawe	More images	Swansea	1934	48 metres (157 ft)	Grade I listed (14594). Architect: Percy Thomas Partnership.
Swansea	Old Guildhall, Swansea; Hen Guildhall, Abertawe	More images	Swansea	1829		Grade II* listed (11643). Architect: John Collingwood.
Talgarth	Talgarth Town Hall; Neuadd y Dref Talgarth	More images	Powys	1878		Grade II listed (7480). Architect: Thomas Lawrence Lewis.
Tenby	Tenby Town Hall; Neuadd y Dref Dinbych-y-pysgod	More images	Pembrokeshire	1829		Grade II listed (6169).
Tonypandy	Tonypandy Town Hall; Neuadd y Dref Tonypandy	More images	Rhondda Cynon Taf	1892		
Tredegar	Tredegar Town Hall; Neuadd y Dref Tredegar	More images	Blaenau Gwent	1892		Grade II listed (22489).
Tremadog	Tremadog Town Hall; Neuadd y Dref Tremadog	More images	Gwynedd	1810		Grade II* listed (4452).
Usk	Old Town Hall, Usk; Hen Neuadd y Dref Brynbuga	More images	Monmouthshire	1771		Grade II listed (2176).
Welshpool	Welshpool Town Hall; Neuadd y Dref Y Trallwng	More images	Powys	1874	27 metres (89 ft)	Grade II listed (14930). Architect: Benjamin Lay.
Whitland	Whitland Town Hall; Neuadd y Dref Hendy-gwyn	More images	Carmarthenshire	1904		
Wrexham	Wrexham Guildhall; Neuadd y Dref Wrecsam	More images	Wrexham	1961		Architect: Stephenson, Young & Partners.

== See also ==
- List of city and town halls
