= List of city and town halls in the United Kingdom =

This is a list of city and town halls in the United Kingdom.

- for town halls in England see List of city and town halls in England
- for town halls in Scotland see List of city chambers and town halls in Scotland
- for town halls in Northern Ireland see List of city and town halls in Northern Ireland
- for town halls in Wales see List of city and town halls in Wales
