= Whitland Rural District =

Former Rural District of Carmarthenshire, Wales

Whitland Rural District Council
- History
  - Created: 1894
  - Abolished: 1935
  - Succeeded by: Carmarthen District Council
- Status: Rural District
  - HQ: Park Temperance Hotel, Whitland

Whitland Rural District Council was a local authority in the central part of Carmarthenshire, Wales created in 1894.

The authority covered the parishes of Castledwyran, Ciffig, Cilymaenllwyd, Eglwys fair a-Cherig, Ergmont, Eglwyscummin, Henllan-Amgoed, Llanfallteg East, Llandissilio East, Llanglydwen, Llanboidy, Llangan East, Marros, and Pendine.

The authority was abolished following local government reorganisation in 1974, and its role taken on by Carmarthen District Council.

== Elections ==
1901
Ward	Candidate
Castledwyran	Mr T. Evans
Ciffig	
Cilymaenllwyd	
Eglwys fair a-Cherig	
Ergmont	
Eglwyscummin	
Henllan-Amgoed	
Llanfallteg East	
Llandissilio East	
Llanglydwen	
Llanboidy	
Llangan East	Mr George Evans
Marros	
Pendine	
