= Whitland Town Hall =

Municipal Building in Whitland, Wales

- Neuadd y Dref Hendy-gwyn (Welsh)
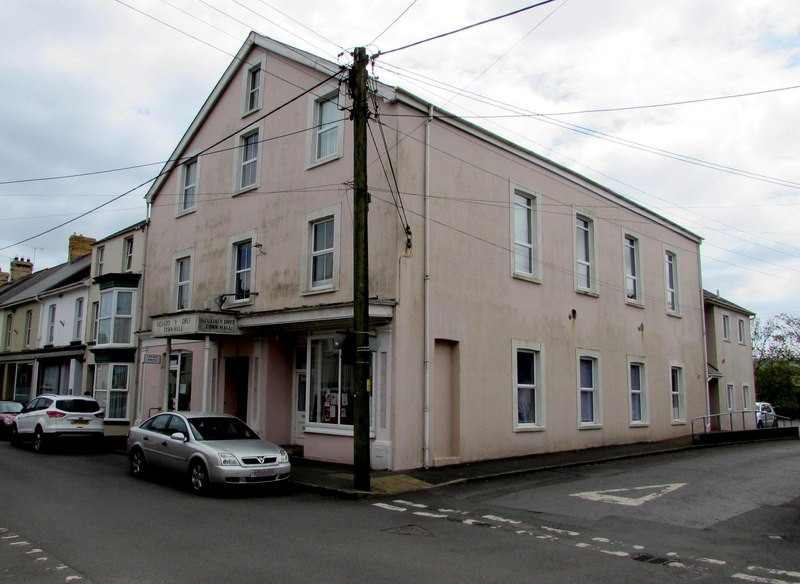
- The building in May 2015

- Shown in Carmarthenshire
- 51.8187°N 4.6153°W
- Location: King Edward Street, Whitland

History
- Built: 1904

Site notes
- Architectural style: Vernacular style

Whitland Town Hall (Welsh: Neuadd y Hendy-gwyn) is a municipal building located on King Edward Street in Whitland in Carmarthenshire in Wales. The structure is currently used as the offices and meeting place of Whitland Town Council.

== History ==
The building was commissioned for retail and industrial use by the Whitland Industrial Co-operative Society in the early 20th century. The site they selected was on the corner of King Edward Street and Cross Street on the south side of the town, just to the north of Whitland railway station. The rail connection was important as the local co-operative society's activities included dispatching milk from local farms via the local railway station in railway milk tankers to outlets throughout London.

The building was designed in the Vernacular style, built in brick with a cement render finish and was completed in 1904. The design involved a symmetrical main frontage of three bays facing onto King Edward Street. The central bay featured a doorway, flanked by a pair of iron columns supporting a timber canopy. There were shop fronts on either side of the doorway. The first and second floors were both fenestrated by casement windows and there was a single casement window at attic level in the gable above. The ground floor was originally used by the Whitland Industrial Cooperative Society as a shop and the first floor was made available for public meetings. The whole structure became known as the Town Hall Buildings.

The ground floor was later used as a butcher's shop. In 1951, its upper floor was converted for use as the Coliseum cinema, and the remainder was converted into a staff and social club. In 1964, the social club took over the cinema and converted it into a bingo hall. The building was not used for municipal purposes at that time: although the local authority for the area, Whitland Rural District Council was named after the town, the council established its offices at Market Square in Narberth, rather than at the Town Hall Buildings. Similarly, the local parish council for Whitland was based on St Mary Street rather than at the Town Hall Buildings. However, the building was acquired by an independent board of trustees, so that it could be managed on behalf of the community, in 1973, and the board was registered as a charity in 1979.

The building was then refurbished in 1992, to provide a small library on the ground floor, a main hall able to seat 200 people, and a mayoral parlour in which meetings of the successor body to the parish council, Whitland Town Council, could be held. It has since also become the location for the food bank for local people in financial difficulty.
