= Church of St Nicholas, Grosmont =

Coordinates: 51.9140°N 2.8668°W

Church of St Nicholas
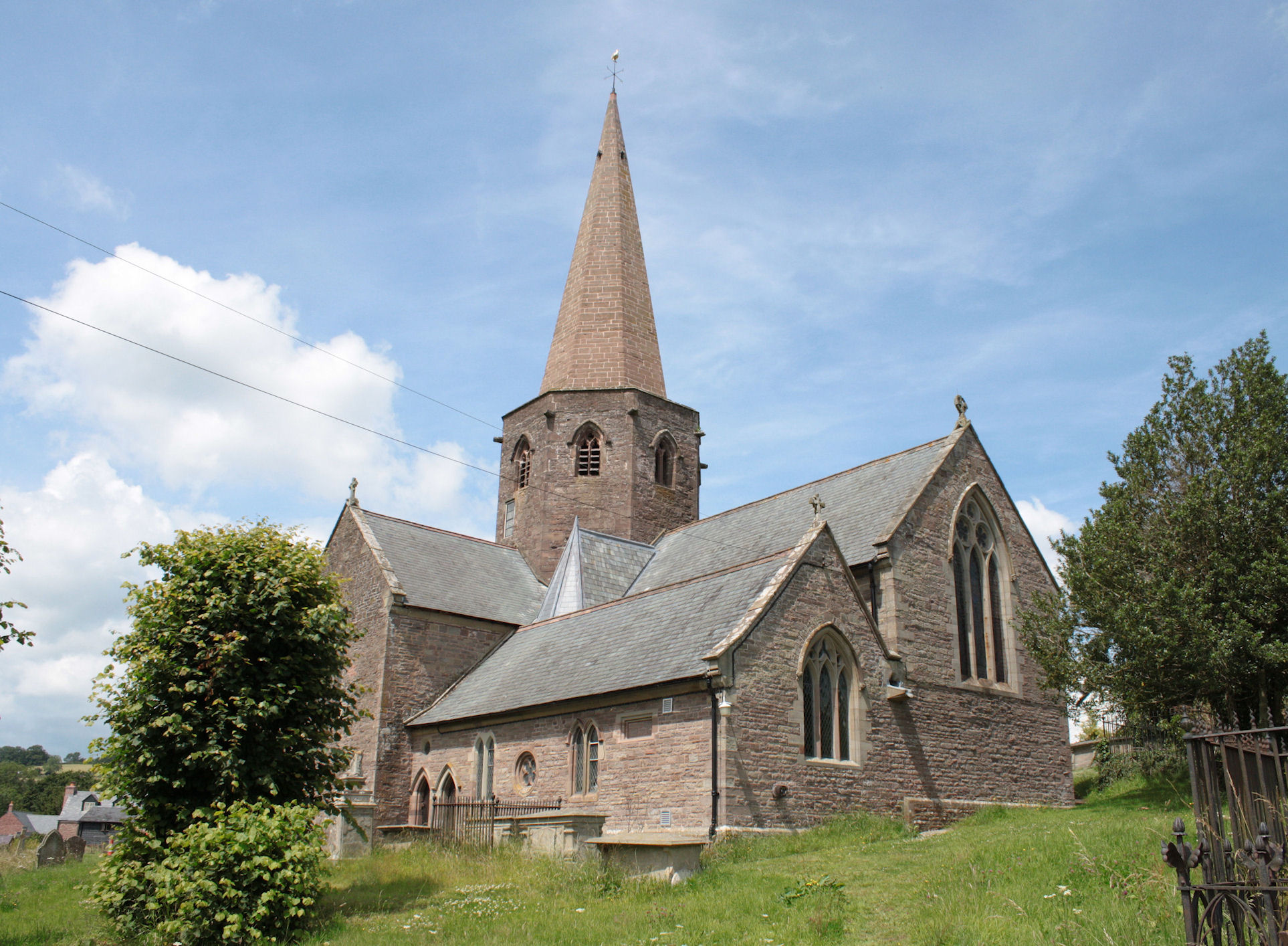
- "an exceptionally fine church of remarkable size"

- Location in Monmouthshire
- OS grid reference: SO404243
- Location: Grosmont, Monmouthshire
- Country: Wales
- Denomination: Church in Wales

History
- Status: parish church
- Founded: c.13th century

Architecture
- Functional status: Active
- Heritage designation: Grade I
- Designated: 9 January 1956
- Architectural type: Church
- Style: Early English

Administration
- Diocese: Monmouth
- Archdeaconry: Monmouth
- Deanery: Abergavenny
- Parish: Grosmont

Clergy
- Vicar: Rev. Dr. Jean Prosser

The Church of St Nicholas in the village of Grosmont, Monmouthshire, Wales, is a parish church dating from the 13th century. Its exceptional size reflects the importance and standing of the borough of Grosmont at the time of the church's construction and has led it to be called a "miniature cathedral". Largely unaltered from the time of its building, by the 19th century the church had seriously decayed and its tower was close to collapsing. It was rescued from dereliction in a restoration undertaken by John Pollard Seddon and financed by John Etherington Welch Rolls.

An active parish church, it is a Grade I listed building.

== History ==
Medieval Grosmont, with its stone castle founded by Hubert de Burgh in the 13th century and site of the birth of Henry of Grosmont, 1st Duke of Lancaster in the early 14th century, was an important medieval lordship. Cadw records that the scale of the "great cruciform church mark(ed) the important standing of Grosmont during the early medieval period.

The church was constructed in the early 13th century and the roof of the nave is datable to c.1232, making it the oldest scientifically datable roof in Wales. Tree-ring dating of the timbers show that they were felled in the period 1214–1244, which confirms the exceptionally early date of the roof's construction. It is considered "the only surviving pre-1400 church roof in Wales". The nave remains largely unrestored, but the rest of the church is later.

By the late 19th century the church was close to collapse and was saved through an extensive reconstruction in 1869–79 by J. P. Seddon. The work was largely funded by John Etherington Welch Rolls of The Hendre, a local landowner and benefactor.

The church remains an active church in the parish of Grosmont. Morning prayers at held at the church each Tuesday, as are Sunday services.

== Architecture and description ==
The church is a "noble Early English building crowned by an octagonal Decorated tower and spire". Simon Jenkins considers the "ambitious cruciform plan" with octagonal tower to be "French" in inspiration. Cadw notes the tradition that the architect was French, employed by Eleanor of Provence but records that this "has no documentary basis".

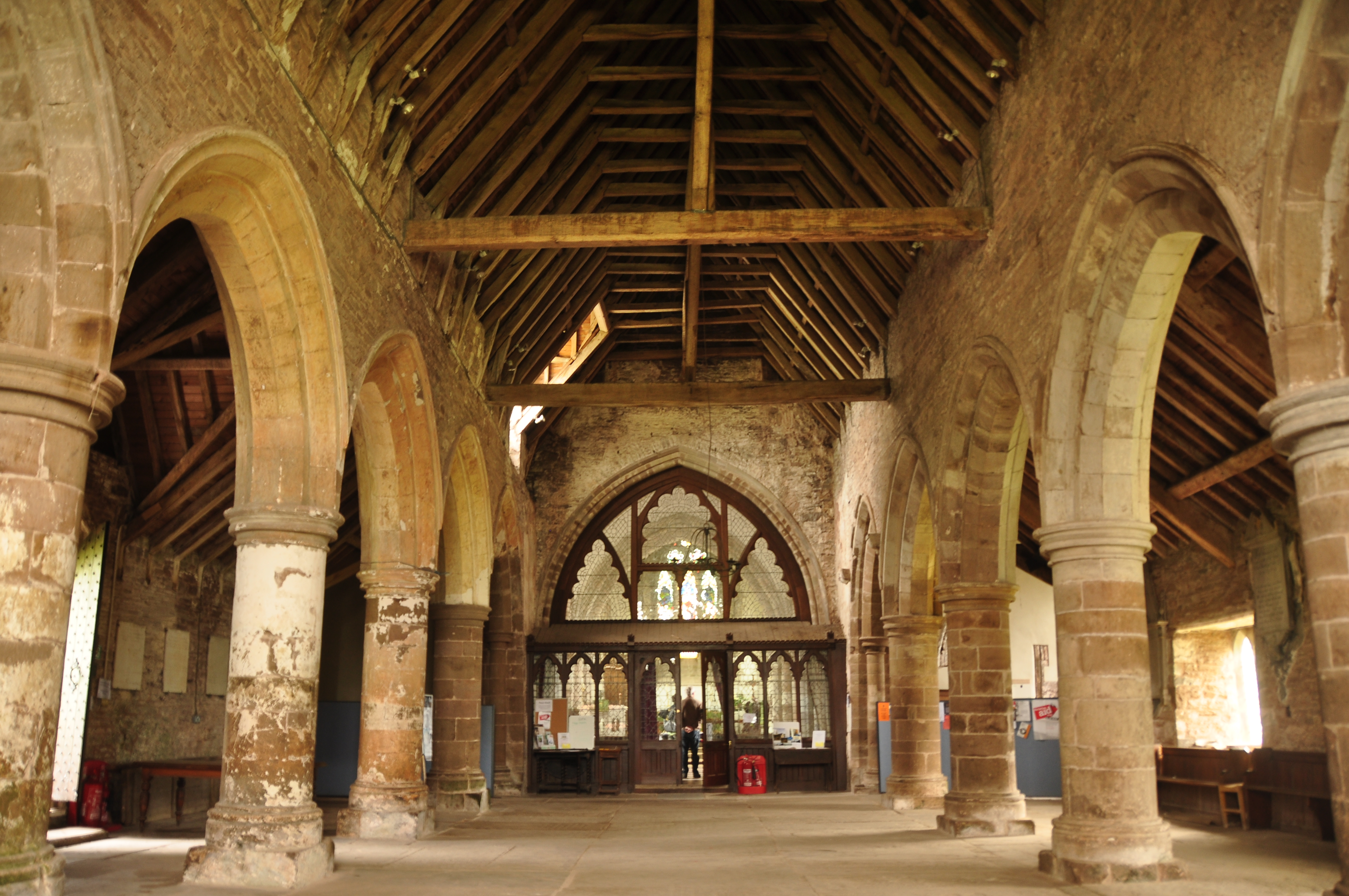
The unrestored nave

The church is built of Old Red Sandstone with ashlar dressings and slate roofs. It comprises the nave, transepts, the central tower, a chancel, a secondary chapel and a porch.

The interior is "a shock to the modern visitor who encounters an uncluttered medieval interior dominated by the arcades and roof". The unfurnished nave demonstrates the "strong early thirteenth century arcades to the full". The architectural historian John Newman describes the font as "a strange piece, an octagonal bowl with a thick circular stem". The choir stalls and the pulpit are 19th century. A stained-glass window in the chancel commemorates John Etherington Welch Rolls. In the transept is an unfinished memorial to a knight, dating from the late 13th or early 14th century, "a rare survival of great technical interest".

== Sources ==
- Jenkins, Simon (2008). Wales: Churches, Houses, Castles. London: Penguin. ISBN 978-0-713-99893-1.
- Knight, Jeremy K. (2009). The Three Castles. Cardiff: CADW. ISBN 978-1-85760-266-1.
- Newman, John (2000). Gwent/Monmouthshire. The Buildings of Wales. Penguin. ISBN 0-14-071053-1.
