= Pwllheli =

Town in Gwynedd, north-west Wales

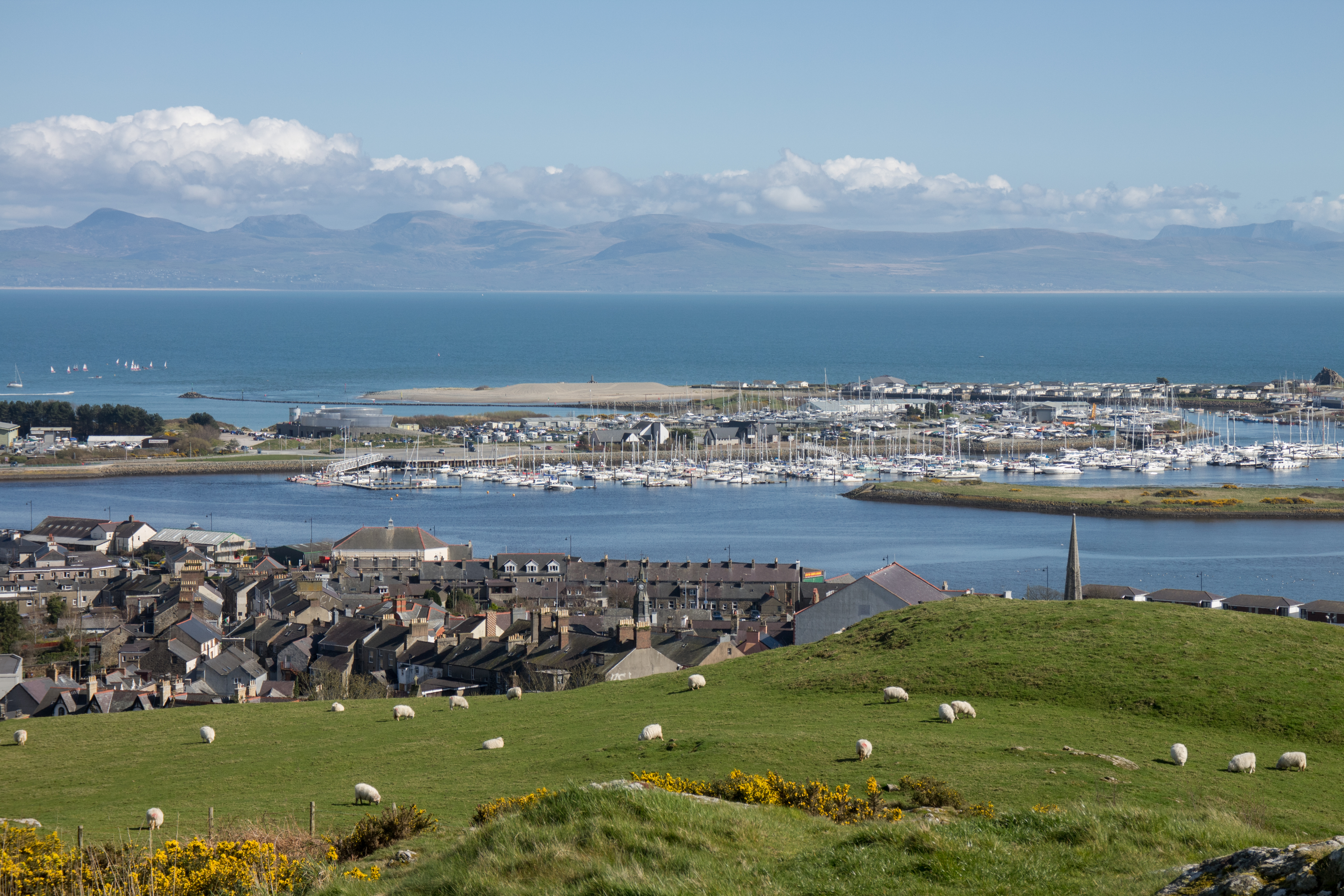
- A view of Pwllheli and its marina from Pen-y-Garn

- Location within Gwynedd
- Population: 3,947
- OS grid reference: SH374350
- Community: Pwllheli
- Principal area: Gwynedd
- Preserved county: Gwynedd
- Country: Wales
- Sovereign state: United Kingdom
- Post town: PWLLHELI
- Postcode district: LL53
- Dialling code: 01758
- Police: North Wales
- Fire: North Wales
- Ambulance: Welsh
- UK Parliament: Dwyfor Meirionnydd
- Senedd Cymru – Welsh Parliament: Gwynedd Maldwyn
- List of places UK Wales Gwynedd 52.887°N 4.418°W Map of the community

Pwllheli (Welsh: [pʊɬˈhɛli] ;) is a market town and community on the Llŷn Peninsula (Welsh: Penrhyn Llŷn), in Gwynedd, north-west Wales. It had a population of 4,076 in 2011, which declined slightly to 3,947 in 2021; a large proportion (81%) were Welsh speaking. Pwllheli is the place where Plaid Cymru was founded. It is the birthplace of the Welsh poet Sir Albert Evans-Jones (bardic name Cynan).

Pwllheli has a range of shops and other services. As a local railhead with a market every Wednesday, the town is a gathering point for the peninsula's population.

== Etymology ==
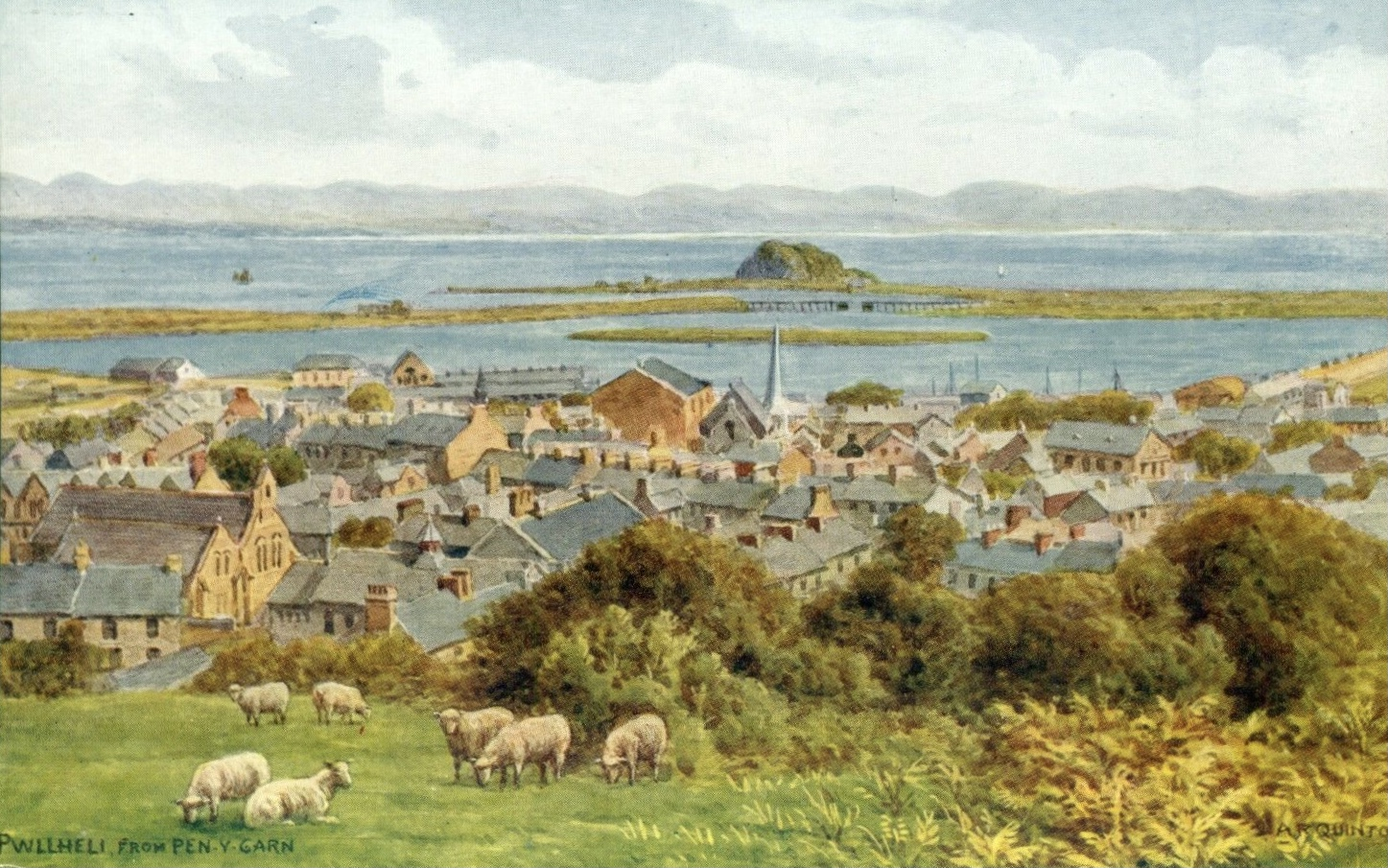
A. R. Quinton, Pwllheli from Pen-y-Garn, c. 1920

The town's name means 'salt-water pool'.

== History ==
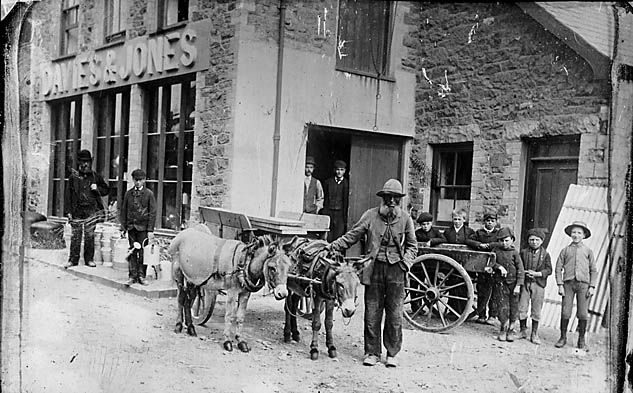
Donkeys outside a warehouse in Pwllheli, c. 1885.

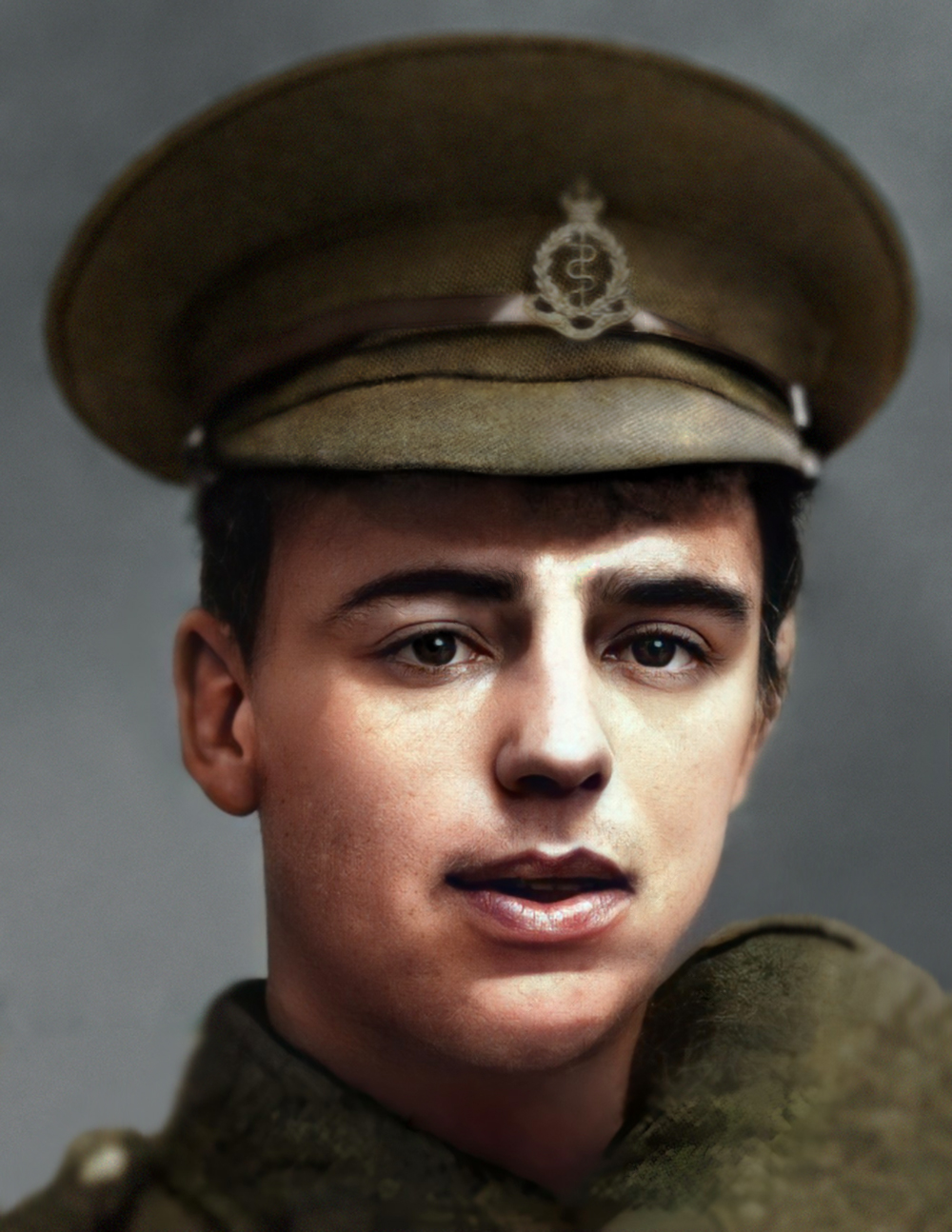
Albert Evans-Jones (Cynan)

The town was given its charter as a borough by Edward, the Black Prince in 1355; a market is still held each Wednesday in the centre of the town on Y Maes ('the field', equivalent to 'the town square' in English).

The town grew around the shipbuilding and fishing industries and the granite quarry at Gimlet Rock (Welsh: Carreg yr Imbill).

The population in 1841 was 2,367.

During the 1890s, the town was developed by Solomon Andrews, a Cardiff businessman. This work included the promenade, roads and houses at West End. The Pwllheli and Llanbedrog Tramway was built, linking the town to Llanbedrog. The trams ran until 1927, when the section of track between Carreg-y-Defaid and Tyddyn-Caled was seriously damaged by a storm. Andrews ran the Cardiff Road section in 1928 and offered to sell the tramway to Pwllheli Corporation at the end of the season, but they did not take up his offer. He then sold the assets and the Corporation removed the tracks during the winter of 1928/29.

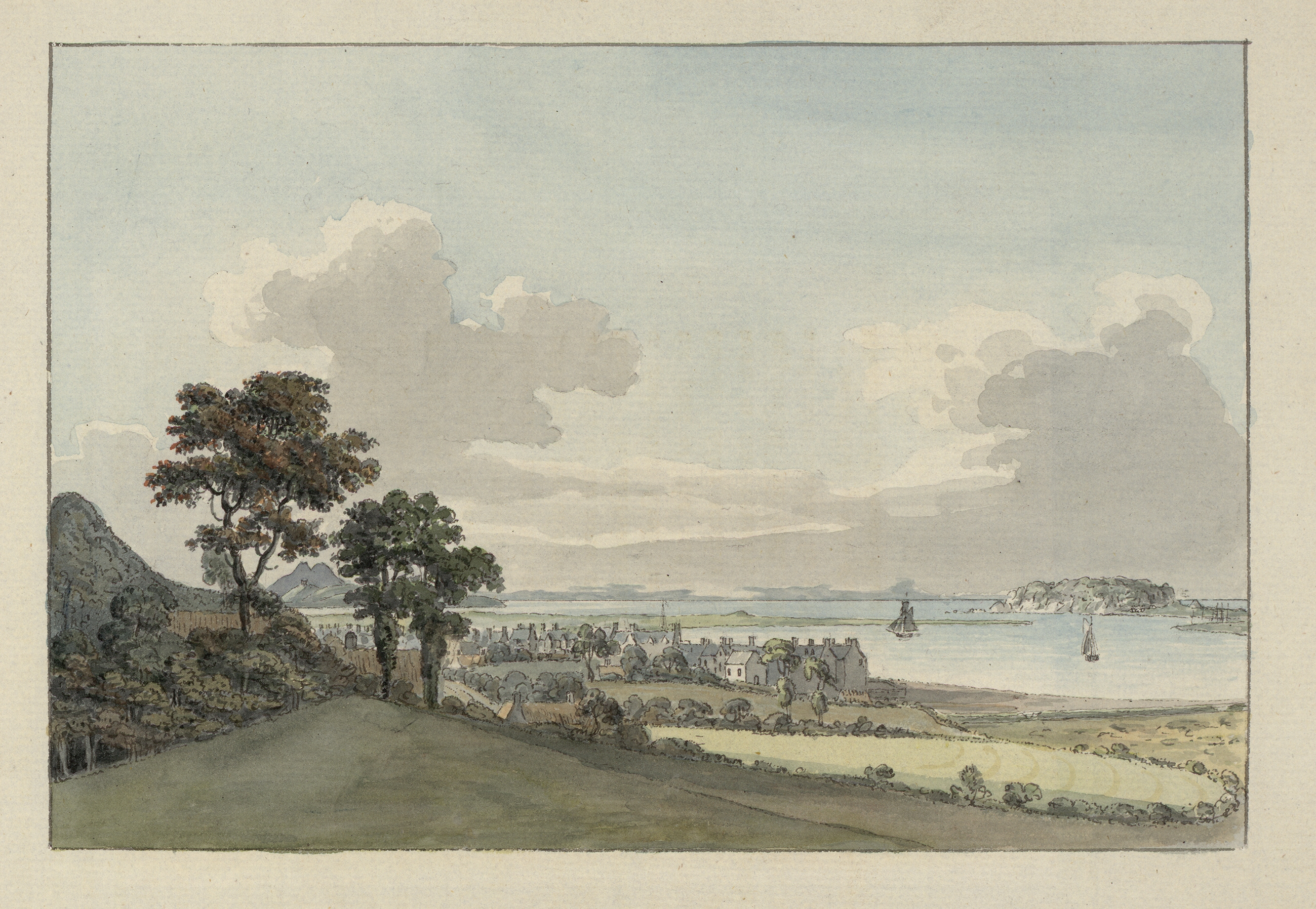
Pwllheli, c.1778

Poet Albert Evans-Jones, who was an archdruid for the National Eisteddfod of Wales and was known by his bardic name Cynan, was born in Pwllheli. Before becoming an archdruid, he joined the First World War effort through the Welsh Student Company of the RAMC, serving in Salonika and France, initially as an ambulance driver and medic, later as the company's chaplain. He was the son of the proprietor of the Central Restaurant in Penlan Street, Pwllheli.

== Governance ==
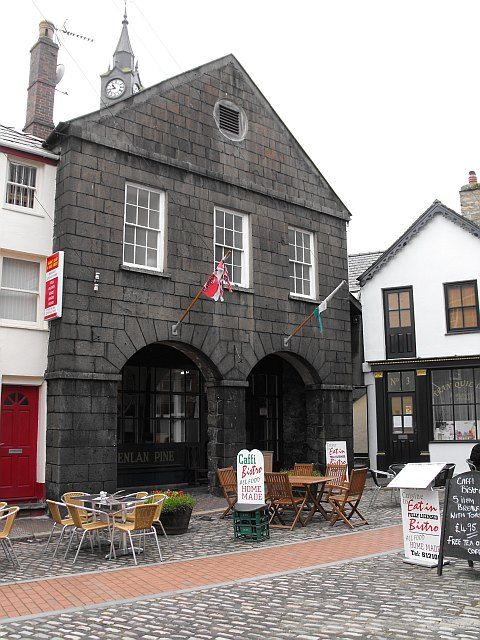
Old Town Hall, Market Square frontage

There are two tiers of local government covering Pwllheli, at community (town) and county level, with both councils using Welsh as their primary language: Cyngor Tref Pwllheli ('Pwllheli Town Council') and Cyngor Gwynedd ('Gwynedd Council'). The town council is based at the Old Town Hall at 9 Penlan Street.

=== Administrative history ===
Pwllheli formed part of the ancient parish of Denio (or Deneio). It also was part of the medieval cantref of Llŷn, which in 1284 was made part of the new county of Caernarfonshire under the Statute of Rhuddlan. Pwllheli was made a borough in 1355 under a charter from Edward the Black Prince. The borough covered the same area as the parish of Denio. The borough was reformed to become a municipal borough in 1836 under the Municipal Corporations Act 1835, which standardised how most boroughs operated across the country.

The borough of Pwllheli was abolished in 1974 under the Local Government Act 1972. A community called Pwllheli was created instead, covering the area of the abolished borough. District-level functions passed to Dwyfor District Council, which was in turn replaced in 1996 by Gwynedd Council.

== Education ==
Ysgol Cymerau is the town's primary school.

Ysgol Glan y Môr was formed in 1969 by the merger of the former Pwllheli Grammar School at Penrallt and the Frondeg Secondary Modern School in Upper Ala Road to form a comprehensive school based on two sites in the town. The junior pupils (year 1 and year 2) were located at the Penrallt site and the senior pupils (year 3 and upwards) at a new complex in Cardiff Road. This new school was subsequently expanded to accommodate all pupils under the Ysgol Glan y Môr name.

The Penrallt site was later redeveloped as the Pwllheli campus of Coleg Meirion-Dwyfor. The façade of the main building of the old grammar school was retained and incorporated into the design of the current college buildings. Thus the 'old school' is readily seen from the town square (Y Maes), as it has been since the former Pwllheli County School moved to Penrallt in the early 20th century.

== Transport ==
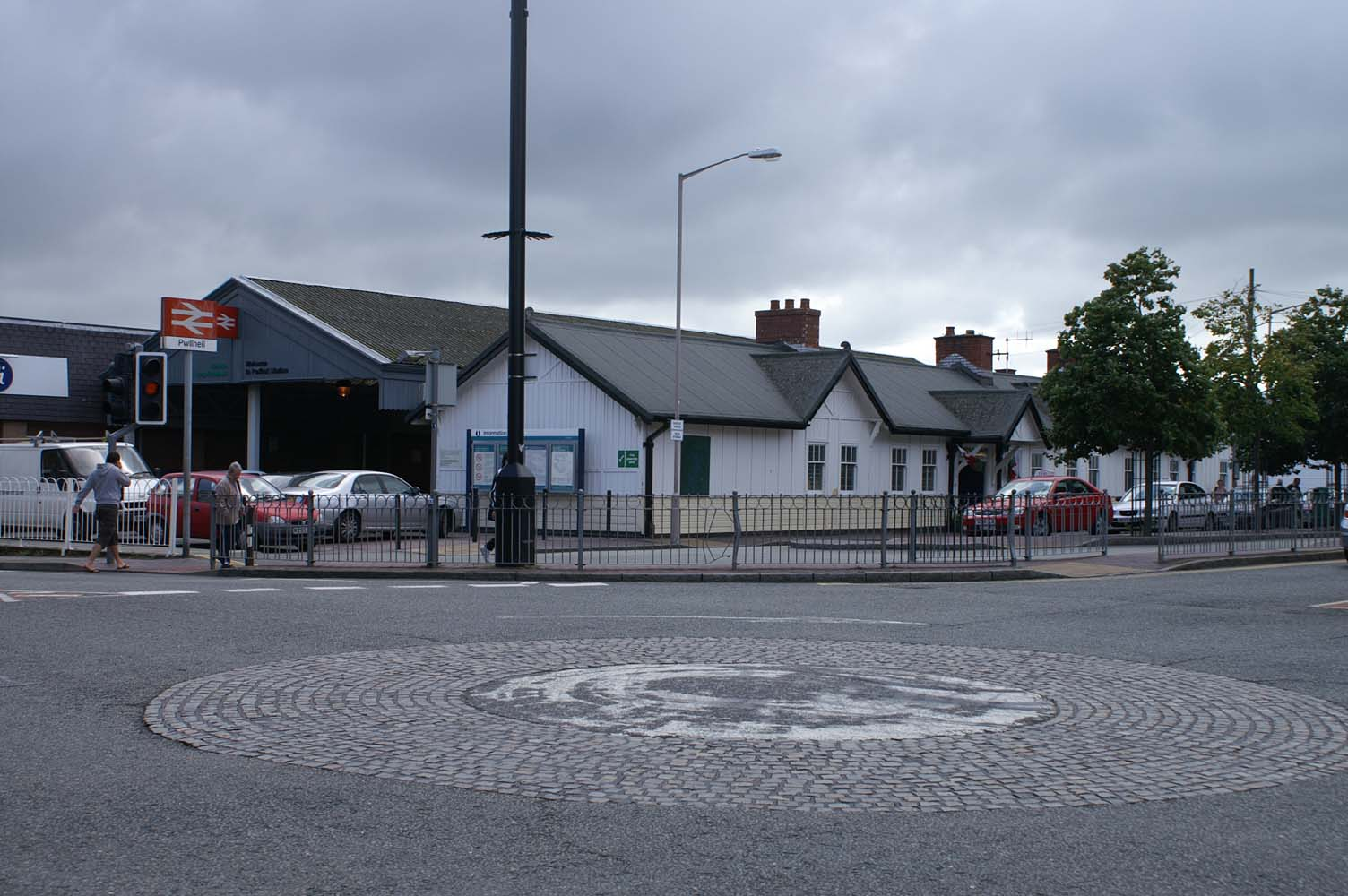
Pwllheli railway station

Pwllheli railway station is the north-western terminus of the Cambrian Coast Line, which provides services to Machynlleth; most trains continue on to Shrewsbury and Birmingham International. Services are operated by Transport for Wales.

The railway line to Caernarvon, via the Carnarvonshire Railway, was axed under the Beeching cuts and it closed in December 1964.

Pwllheli is connected to the wider road network by the A497 to Porthmadog and the A499 to Caernarfon. From there, major roads lead away from Gwynedd to the rest of Wales.

Bus services on the Llŷn Peninsula are operated by Berwyn Coaches and Nefyn. Routes connect the town with Aberdaron, Caernarfon, Nefyn and Rhydlios. Pwllheli bus station is sited in the town centre.

== Attractions ==
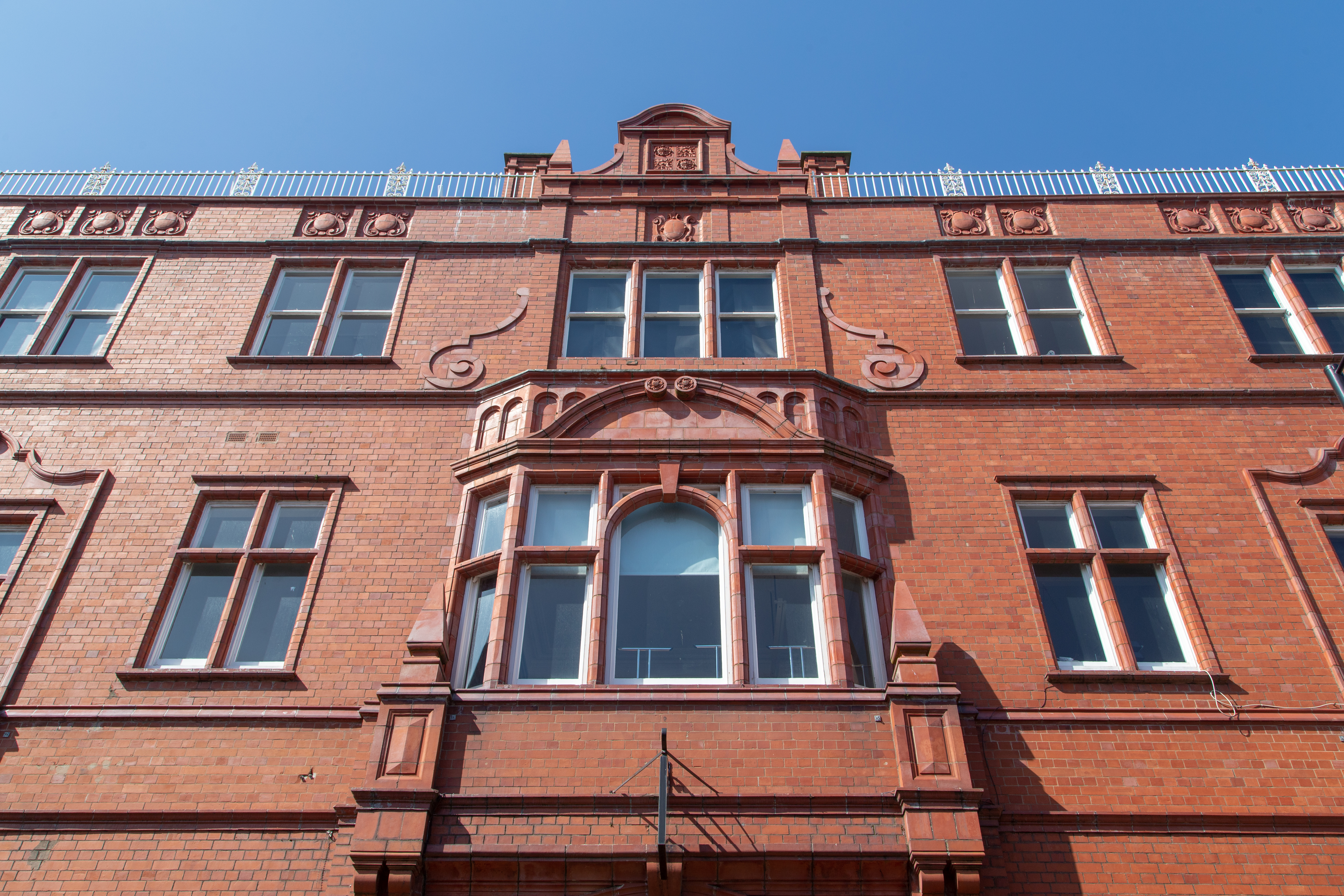
Neuadd Dwyfor

- Plas Bodegroes, which was a Michelin starred restaurant until 2009
- Penarth Fawr, a 15th-century house
- Hafan y Môr, a former Butlins holiday camp now operated by Haven
- Pwllheli Market
- Neuadd Dwyfor, a theatre and cinema in Penlan Street
- Capel Salem, purchased by potter Keith Brymer Jones and actress Marj Hogarth in 2022 and currently under renovation, which is documented in the Channel 4 series Our Welsh Chapel Dream.

Pwllheli has a section of the Wales Coast Path along its shoreline.

=== Pwllheli Harbour and Hafan Pwllheli ===
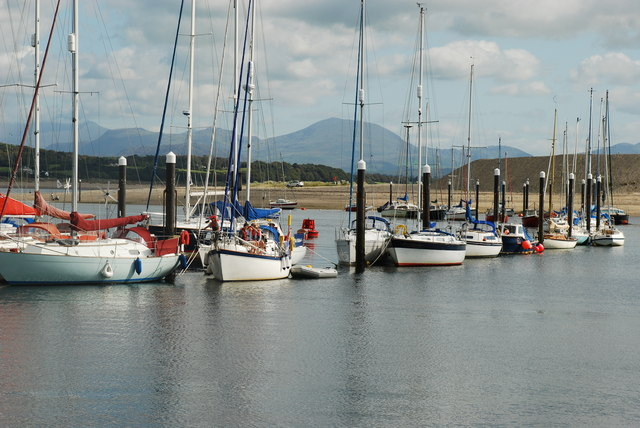
Pwllheli Harbour with Snowdonia in the background.

Pwllheli has a small harbour at the confluence of the Afon Erch and Afon Rhyd-Hir.

Hafan Pwllheli is a marina built in Pwllheli Harbour during the 1990s.

== Arts ==
Pwllheli hosted the National Eisteddfod in 1925, 1955 and 2023, as well as an unofficial National Eisteddfod event in 1875.

== Language ==
According to the 2011 Census, 80% of the population spoke Welsh.

== Sport and leisure ==
Pwllheli is home to association football team Pwllheli F.C., rugby union team Pwllheli RFC and running club Llŷn Striders. There is a hockey club, Clwb Hoci Pwllheli.

It is a hub for water sports, owing in part to a marina; Pwllheli Sailing Club and Plas Heli (the Welsh National Sailing Academy) are based here.

The town has two beaches, South Beach and Glan-y-don. South Beach stretches from Gimlet Rock, across the Promenade and West End, towards Penrhos and Llanbedrog. Glan-y-don Beach is on the eastern side of the river mouth and runs for 3 miles (5 km) from behind the marina workshops and out towards Penychain (holiday camp).

The town has a golf club on the Llŷn coastline.

== Notable people ==
- Eleazar Roberts (1825–1912), musician, translator, writer and amateur astronomer
- Owen Davies (1840–1929), Baptist minister and writer
- Alice Gray Jones (1852–1943), known as Ceridwen Peris, writer, editor and activist; governor of Pwllheli County School
- Sir (Albert) Cynan Evans-Jones (1895–1970), bardic name Cynan, was a war poet and dramatist.
- William Richard Williams (1896–1962), Principal of the United Theological College, Aberystwyth
- John Robert Jones (1911–1970), philosopher
- Eirwen Gwynn (1916–2007), Welsh nationalist, writer, teacher and physicist; attended Pwllheli County School
- Christine Evans (born 1943), poet; taught at Pwllheli County Grammar School
- Hywel Williams (born 1953), Plaid Cymru politician, MP for Arfon, previously Caernarfon, 2001–2024
- David Dawson (born 1960), artist
- Gareth Pierce (born 1981), actor
