= Neuadd Dwyfor =

County Building in Pwllheli, Wales

Pwllheli Town Hall
- Neuadd Dwyfor (Welsh)
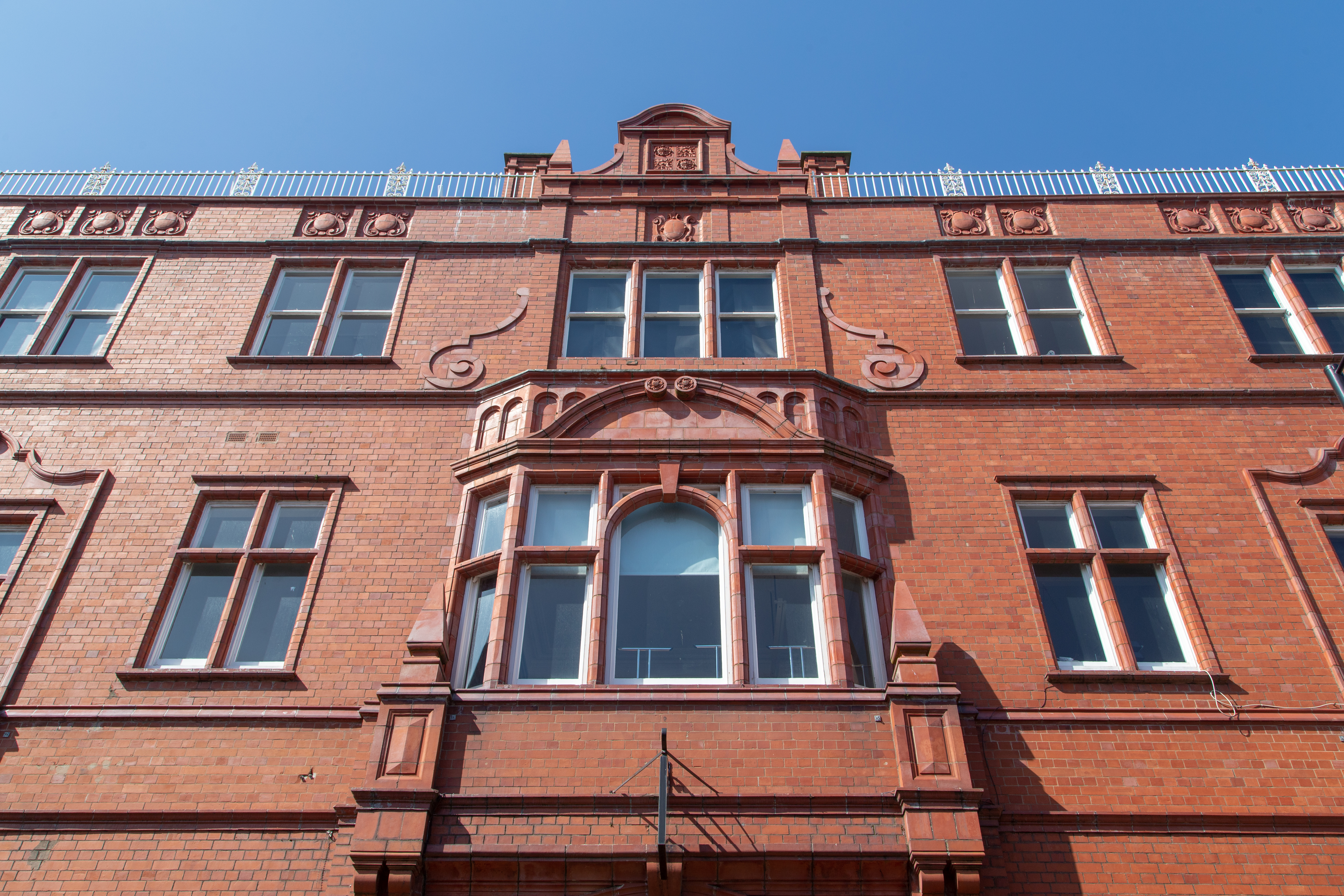
- Pwllheli Town Hall

- Shown in Gwynedd
- 52.8892°N 4.4171°W
- Location: Penlan Street, Pwllheli

History
- Built: 1902

Site notes
- Architect: Arthur James Dickinson
- Architectural style: Baroque style

Listed Building – Grade II
- Official name: Town Hall
- Designated: 28 July 1989
- Reference no.: 4566

Pwllheli Town Hall (Welsh: Neuadd Dwyfor) is a municipal building in Penlan Street, Pwllheli, Gwynedd, Wales. The structure, which now operates as an arts centre, is a Grade II listed building.

== History ==
The first municipal building in the town was the Old Town Hall in the Market Square which was completed in 1731. However, by the turn of the century it was deemed too small and civic officials decided to commission a new structure on the north side of Penlan Street.

The new building was designed by the borough surveyor, Arthur James Dickinson, in the Baroque style, built in terracotta Ruabon brick at a cost of £5,800 and was officially opened in May 1902. The design involved a symmetrical main frontage with five bays facing onto Penlan Street. The central bay featured a large round headed opening with a wrought iron grill in the tympanum flanked by pilasters supporting finials; there was an oriel window surmounted by volutes on the first floor and a tri-partite window on the second floor. The flanking bays were fenestrated by cross-windows on the ground and first floors and by bi-partite windows on the second floor. The outer bays featured round headed openings flanked by pilasters on the ground floor, tri-partite windows surmounted by ovolo mouldings on the first floor and bi-partite windows on the second floor. At roof level, there was a parapet, which was decorated by panels bearing carved cartouches, and, above the parapet, there was a wrought iron railing which was broken by a central pediment. Internally, the principal room was the main auditorium, which featured a proscenium arch.

The town hall served as events venue from an early stage offering theatre and concert performances and, from March 1911, showings of silent films. Margaret Lloyd George, the wife of the future Prime Minister, spoke at a British Army recruiting event in the building in September 1914 at the start of the First World War and the mezzo-soprano opera singer, Leila Megàne, performed there in October 1919.

The building continued to serve as the offices of the borough council for much of the 20th century, but ceased to be the local seat of government when the enlarged Dwyfor District Council was formed in 1974. After an extensive programme of refurbishment works had been completed, the building re-opened as Neuadd Dwyfor in 1995. A new public library area in the building was opened by the playwright, W. S. Jones, in 1996 and a further programme of refurbishment works costing £900,000 was completed in March 2022.
