= Lloyd Williams and Underwood =

Former Welsh architect firm

Lloyd Williams and Underwood was a firm of architects based in Denbigh and active mostly in North Wales in the second half of the 19th century. The partners were Richard Lloyd Williams, formerly a pupil of Thomas Fulljames, and Martin Underwood, who was also county surveyor for Denbighshire. Several of their designed now have listed status.

== Works ==
The firm's designs include:

- Station house at Foryd railway station (1858)
- Remodelling of Galltfaenan Hall (1860s), now Grade II listed
- Denbigh railway station (1860, now demolished); some other stations for the same Vale of Clwyd Railway
- Bettws yn Rhos National School (1861)
- Llanfair Dyffryn Clwyd National School (1861)
- Chapel at North Wales Hospital (1862), now Grade II listed
- Restoration at Church of St James, Nantglyn (1862), Grade II listed
- Chancel at Pontblyddyn Church, Flintshire (1866)
- Llangollen Town Hall (1867), Grade II listed
- Llangollen Police Station (1867), now Grade II listed
- The Church House (Old Grammar School), Ruthin (1867), now Grade II* listed
- Rebuilding of the Church of St Winifred, LLangernyw (1869)
- St Mary's Church, Denbigh (1874), now Grade II* listed
- Buildings at Trewern Farm, Hengoed (ca. 1875), now Grade II listed
- Frongoch Board School (1877)
- Parish Church of St Tudclud (date uncertain), now Grade II listed

== Publications ==
Lloyd Williams and Underwood published some self-authored books in 1872, titled Architectural Monuments of Denbighshire and Village Churches of Denbighshire.
