= Grosmont Town Hall =

County Building in Grosmont, Wales

- Neuadd y Dref Y Grysmwnt (Welsh)
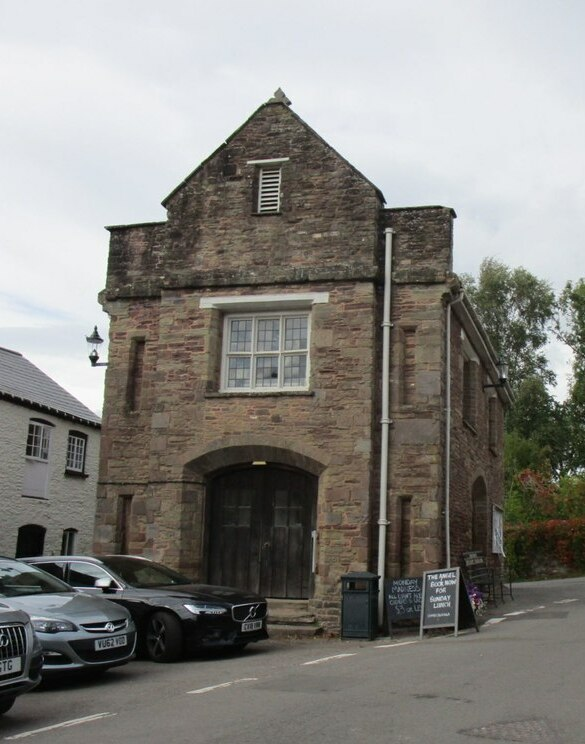
- Grosmont Town Hall

- Shown in Monmouthshire
- 51.9148°N 2.8674°W
- Location: Grosmont

History
- Built: 1832

Site notes
- Architectural style: Neoclassical style

Listed Building – Grade II
- Official name: Grosmont Town Hall
- Designated: 20 March 1981
- Reference no.: 2757

Grosmont Town Hall (Welsh: Neuadd y Dref Y Grysmwnt) is a municipal building in Grosmont, Monmouthshire, Wales. The structure, which is the meeting place of Grosmont Community Council, is a Grade II listed building.

== History ==
The borough of Grosmont was laid out alongside Grosmont Castle by the Normans in the 12th century. By the early 15th century, Grosmont had become a large and important settlement - only Abergavenny and Carmarthen were larger in the whole of South Wales. Any structures that may have existed at that time, including the market hall, were destroyed when an army of 8,000 followers of the Welsh Prince, Owain Glyndŵr, burnt the town to the ground during the Battle of Grosment in 1405.

Although a new timber-framed market hall was built, it was very dilapidated by the early 19th century and Henry Somerset, 6th Duke of Beaufort offered to provide a new town hall for the borough. The new building was designed in the neoclassical style, built in rubble masonry with ashlar dressings and was completed in 1832. The design involved a symmetrical main frontage with three bays facing southeast down the road to Monmouth. It was originally arcaded and open on all sides, to allow markets to be held, with an assembly room for the borough council on the first floor. The central bay, which projected forward, featured a wide segmental opening with voussoirs on the ground floor and a six-light mullioned and transomed window on the first floor with a parapet and gable above. The narrow side bays contained blind lancet windows on both floors. The room on the ground floor contained two large octagonal stones, placed on top of one another to form a counter; these stones had originally formed the base of the market cross.

The town hall was the venue for the annual mayor-making ceremony, until the borough was abolished and replaced by a local parish council in 1857. Henry Somerset, 9th Duke of Beaufort offered the town hall to Grosmont Parish Council in May 1902. The parish council evolved to become Grosmont Community Council who continued to use the town hall for its meetings. An extensive programme of repairs was carried out, with financial support from the Village Alive Trust, and completed in 2012.
