= Old Town Hall, Pwllheli =

Municipal Building in Pwllheli, Wales

- Hen Neuadd y Dref Pwllheli (Welsh)
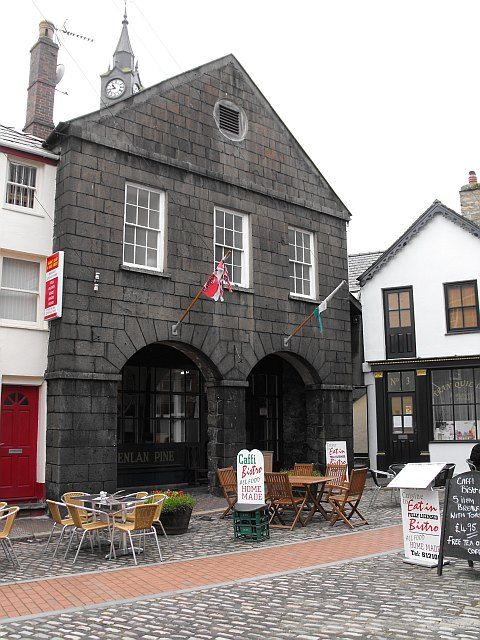
- The building in July 2012

- Shown in Gwynedd
- 52.8894°N 4.4170°W
- Location: Penlan Street, Pwllheli

History
- Built: 1820

Site notes
- Architectural style: Neoclassical style

Listed Building – Grade II
- Official name: Old Town Hall
- Designated: 1 June 1949
- Reference no.: 4562

The Old Town Hall (Welsh: Hen Neuadd y Dref Pwllheli) is a municipal building located on Penlan Street in Pwllheli in Gwynedd in Wales. The structure, which accommodates offices and meeting place of Pwllheli Town Council, is a Grade II listed building.

== History ==
The building was originally constructed as a guildhall in about 1731. In 1820, it was reconstructed as a market hall, with an arcade on the ground floor, a gaol in the basement, and a council chamber on the upper floor. It was remodelled in 1836, and in about 1880 a clock tower was added. The future Prime Minister, David Lloyd George, gave his first public speech to a group of local farmers in this building on market day in 1884.

However, by the turn of the century the building was deemed too small and civic officials decided to commission a new structure nearby, on the north side of Penlan Street. In 1902, the council moved to the new building, which is now known as Neuadd Dwyfor, and sold the old town hall to the Pwllheli Liberal Club. The building was grade II listed in 1949. In the 1950s, the ground floor of the building was used for a while by a firm of corn merchants, Prichard Ellis.

Following local government re-organisation in 1974, the town council established its offices in the Old Town Hall, where it continues to be accommodated and hold its meetings.

== Architecture ==
The two-storey building is four bays wide, with its gable end facing Market Square. It is built of stone, with brick chimneys and a slate roof. The first floor has 12-pane sash windows, and there is a ventilator to the attic. The ground floor was formerly open, now closed by a glazed screen. It has paired semicircular arches, on the longer facade flanked by smaller arches. There is an octagonal clocktower with a belfry. The clock mechanism was designed and manufactured by Whitehouse & Son of Derby. Inside, there are octagonal piers, which are said to have originally been ships' masts. There is a council chamber, featuring a panelled ceiling, on the first floor.
