= Llangollen Town Hall =

Municipal building in Llangollen, Wales

- Neuadd y Dref Llangollen (Welsh)
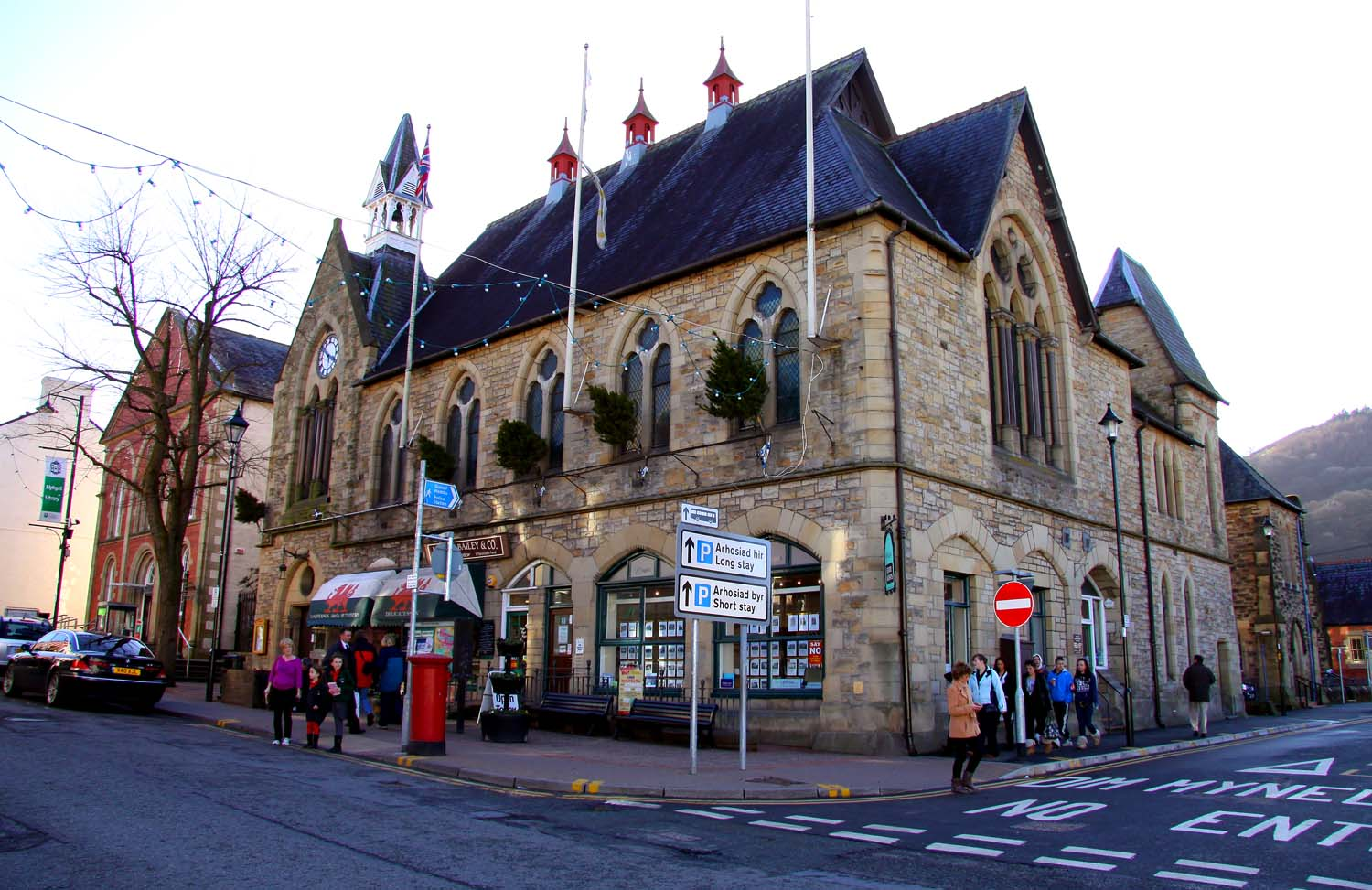
- Llangollen Town Hall

- Shown in Denbighshire
- 52.9702°N 3.1706°W
- Location: Castle Street, Llangollen

History
- Built: 1867

Site notes
- Architect: Lloyd Williams and Underwood
- Architectural style: Gothic Revival style

Listed Building – Grade II
- Official name: Town Hall
- Designated: 22 December 1989
- Reference no.: 1142

Llangollen Town Hall (Welsh: Neuadd y Dref Llangollen), is a municipal building in Castle Street, Llangollen, Denbighshire, Wales. The structure, which is the meeting place of Llangollen Town Council, is a Grade II listed building.

== History ==
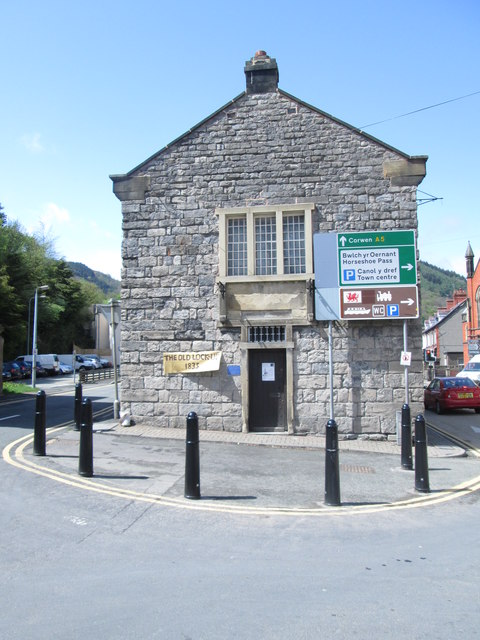
The old town hall in Berwyn Street

The first municipal building in the town was a lock-up for petty criminals at the junction of Berwyn Street and Hall Street which was designed in the Tudorbethan style, built in rubble masonry and completed in 1834.

Following the formation of a local board of health in the area in 1857, the room on the first floor was adapted for use as the meeting place of the board and as the local town hall. A local builder, Morris Roberts, immediately launched an initiative to erect a more substantial structure in the town: the site he proposed for development was open land in New Street, now known as Castle Street, which he acquired at auction in December 1858. The new building was designed by Lloyd Williams and Underwood in the Gothic Revival style, built in rubble masonry and was completed in 1867.

The design involved an asymmetrical main frontage with six bays facing onto Castle Street; the left-hand bay featured an arched entrance with a square-headed doorway and an oculus in the tympanum. There was an arched recess containing a pair of cusped lancet windows and a clock on the first floor, and a gable above. The main hall section, formed by the five bays to the right, featured arched openings with linked voussoirs on the ground floor and mullioned windows with quatrefoils and voussoirs on the first floor. At roof level, there was a bellcote with a pyramid-shaped roof above the left-hand bay. Internally, the principal rooms were a market hall on the ground floor and an assembly room on the first floor.

The building was also used an events venue: performers included the actress, Helena Faucit, who read passages written by William Shakespeare there in autumn 1877. The local board of health was succeeded by the Llangollen Urban District Council which established its offices in the town hall in 1894. After the condition of the building deteriorated and police refused the "Maggie Morton Theatrical Company" from performing there in November 1901, the new council initiated extensive repairs at a cost of £3,000 in 1902.

Fund raising events in aid of the Red Cross were held in the building during the First World War, and a war memorial, in the form of a celtic cross, which was intended to commemorate the lives of local service personnel who had died in the war, was erected and unveiled in front of the building in the early 1920s.

The building continued to serve as the meeting place of the urban district council for much of the 20th century, but ceased to be the local seat of government when the enlarged Glyndŵr District Council was formed in 1974. Following the introduction of unitary authorities in 1996, ownership of the building was transferred to Denbighshire County Council. It became the regular meeting place of Llangollan Town Council, which went on to acquire the building in March 2012. The building also continued to be used as a community events venue with the Dee Rocks music festival held in May each year, and the Llangollen Fringe Festival held in July each year.
