= Llantwit Major Town Hall =

Municipal Building in Llantwit Major, Wales

- Neuadd y Dref Llanilltud Fawr (Welsh)
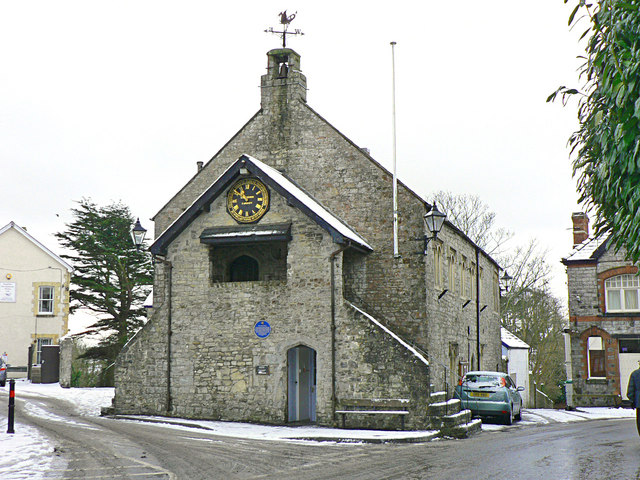
- Northeast gable with stairs, landing and clock

- Shown in Vale of Glamorgan
- 51°24′29″N 3°29′10″W
- Location: Llantwit Major

History
- Built: c.1490

Listed Building – Grade II*
- Designated: 22 February 1963
- Reference no.: 13248

Llantwit Major Town Hall (Welsh: Neuadd y Dref Llanilltud Fawr) is a local government administrative building dating back to the late 15th century, in the town of Llantwit Major in the Vale of Glamorgan, Wales. It is a Grade II* listed building.

== History ==
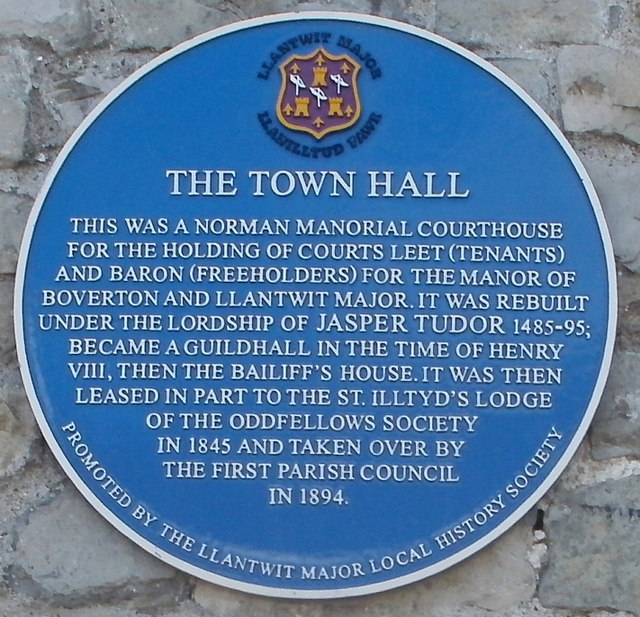
The blue plaque on the wall

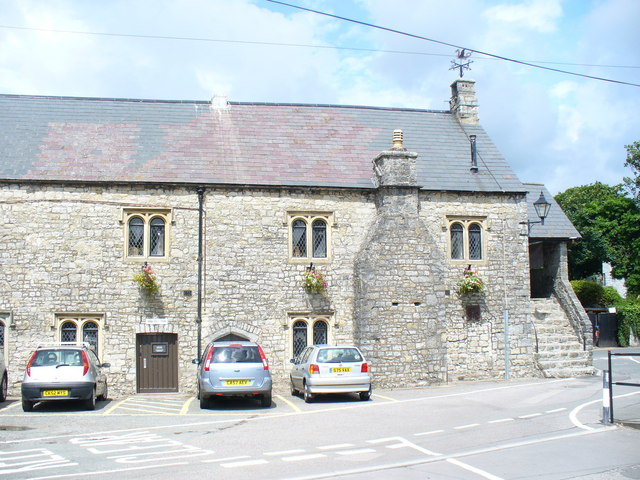
Southeast facade

The original administrative building for the town was ascribed to the late 13th-century Gilbert de Clare, Lord of Glamorgan. The cellar dates from this old courthouse. The present building, in the centre of the old town, was constructed under the lordship of Jasper Tudor in around 1490 and used to collect rents and as a venue for the weekly market. Fairs were also held in the building at weekends. The windows of the Town Hall may have been installed later: they are similar to those of the Old Swan Pub opposite, which date from around 1570. After being found in a state of "utter ruin and decay", it was refurbished in the late 16th century and in subsequent years the lower floor functioned as a school, a slaughterhouse and a jail while the upper floor served as a venue for church meetings and was leased to the St. Illtyd's lodge of the Odd Fellows in 1845. A clock was presented to the town in 1887 to mark the Diamond Jubilee of Queen Victoria.

In the late 19th century, management of the building passed to the new parish council formed under the Local Government Act 1894. It subsequently passed to the town council which has used the town hall as its meeting place since it was formed in 1978. A major refurbishment was carried out in 2017; the refurbishment works, which entirely related to the main hall, included removal of the stage, sanding and re-varnishing the flooring and installing traditional lighting.

== Description ==
The building is constructed of stone and has two stories, with chimney stacks and rows of mullioned windows on the long elevations. At the northeast end are two flights of stone stairs leading to an enclosed landing, above which is the large circular clock. At the apex of the northeast gable end is a bell turret with an ancient bell. The bell bears the inscription, Sancte Iltute, ora pro nobis ("Saint Illtyd, pray for us").

The building contains a hall and a council chamber. The ground floor room at the northeast end is currently used as a Tourist Information office. A blue plaque recording the historical importance of the building was placed on the town hall in February 2007.

== Sources ==
- Newell, Ebenezer Josiah (1887). A popular history of the ancient British church: with special reference to the church in Wales (Public domain ed.). Society for promoting Christian knowledge. pp. 115–.
