= Whitland =

Town and community in Carmarthenshire, Wales

Whitland: Welsh: Hendy-gwyn
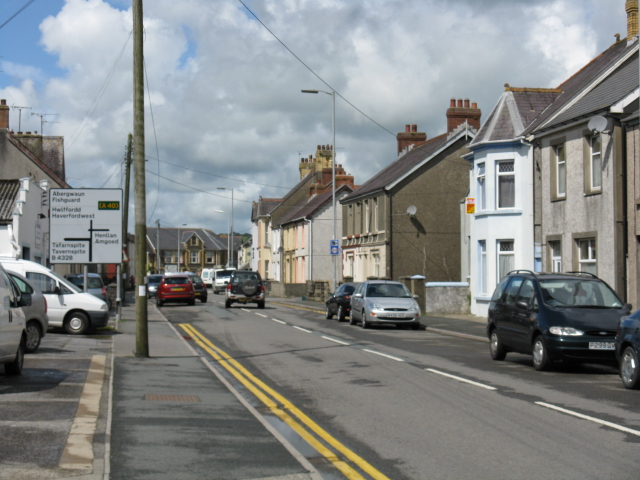
- Market Street, Whitland

- Location within Carmarthenshire
- Population: 1,792 (2011)
- OS grid reference: SN201165
- Community: Whitland
- Principal area: Carmarthenshire
- Preserved county: Dyfed
- Country: Wales
- Sovereign state: United Kingdom
- Post town: WHITLAND
- Postcode district: SA34
- Dialling code: 01994
- Police: Dyfed-Powys
- Fire: Mid and West Wales
- Ambulance: Welsh
- UK Parliament: Caerfyrddin
- Senedd Cymru – Welsh Parliament: Carmarthen West and South Pembrokeshire
- Website: whitlandtowncouncil.co.uk
- List of places UK Wales Carmarthenshire 51.818°N 4.611°W Map of the community

Whitland (Welsh: Hendy-gwyn, lit. 'Old White House', or Hendy-gwyn ar Daf, lit. 'Old White House on the River Taf', from the medieval Ty Gwyn ar Daf) is a town and community in Carmarthenshire, Wales.

== Geography ==
The Whitland community is bordered by the communities of: Henllanfallteg; Llanboidy; and Eglwyscummin, all being in Carmarthenshire; and by Lampeter Velfrey and Llanddewi Velfrey in Pembrokeshire.

According to the 2011 census the population was 1,792.

== History ==
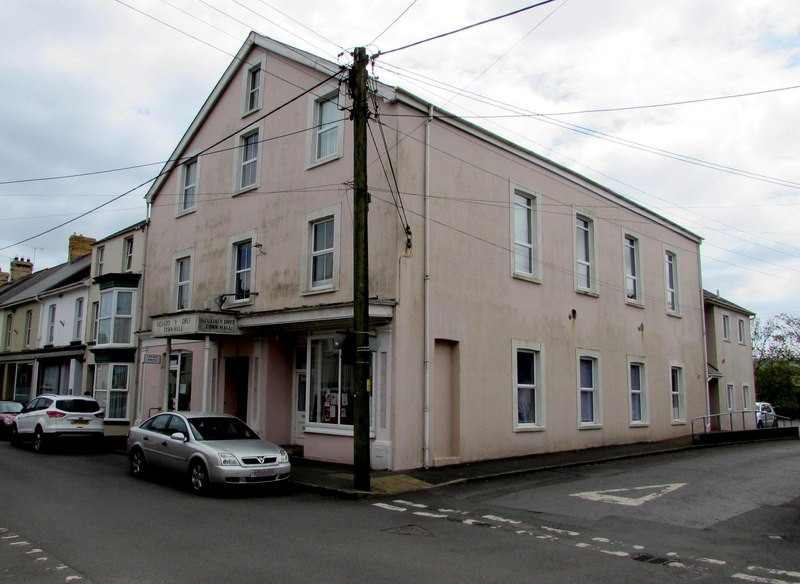
Whitland Town Hall

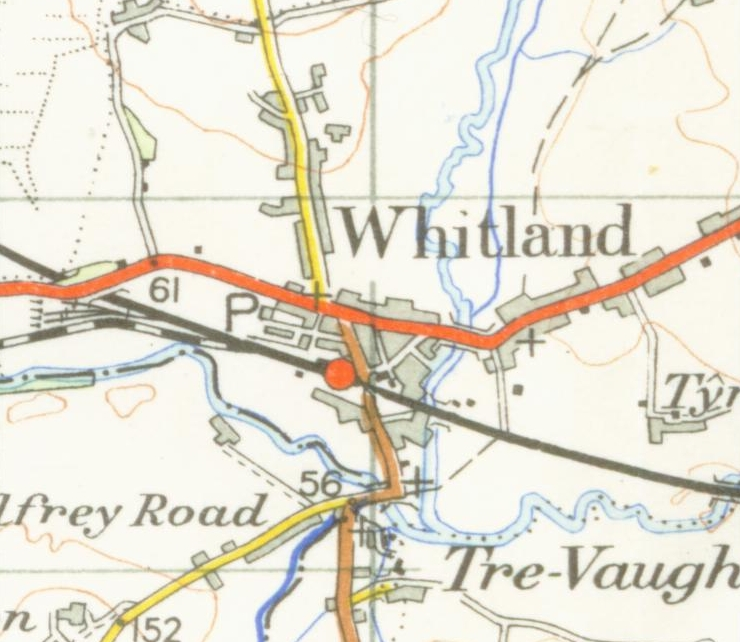
Map of Whitland (1952)

Traditionally, Whitland is seen as the site of an assembly of lawyers and churchmen, sometimes described as the first Welsh parliament, called in 930 by King Hywel Dda to codify the native Welsh laws.

Whitland takes its name from its medieval Cistercian abbey. The monastery pre-dates Tintern but now is very much a ruin. The "white land" of the name (Latin: Albalanda) may refer to the famous Ty Gwyn (English: White House) where Hywel's parliament met, to the monks' unstained woollen cloaks, or to the abbey's limestone. Whitland was dissolved during Henry VIII's conversion to a reformed church. Much of its limestone was taken and used for other buildings. The limestone itself may have been from quarries in the Cotswolds as there is no quarry of this ' White' stone in the area. The country setting of the ruin and the Abbey's layout can still be viewed just north of the A40 roundabout and turning immediately left.

Whitland has had a strong milk industry and, when the railway arrived in the 19th century, exported milk to London. Its dairy, run by Dairy Crest, eventually closed in 1994 with the loss of 100 jobs.

Whitland Town Hall was originally commissioned for retail use and was completed in 1904.

Despite losing its dairy and remaining high street bank, Whitland has an estimated 125 small businesses as well as Whitland Engineering, which services the dairy industry and in 2019 employed 90 people.

== Hywel Dda Centre ==
The Hywel Dda Interpretive Centre is a publicly funded culture centre. It has a garden using reclaimed stone. Hywel Dda is considered one of the most accomplished of Welsh rulers, minting his own coins, codifying the traditional Welsh Laws, and using his diplomacy to secure Wales at a particularly turbulent period.

== Governance ==
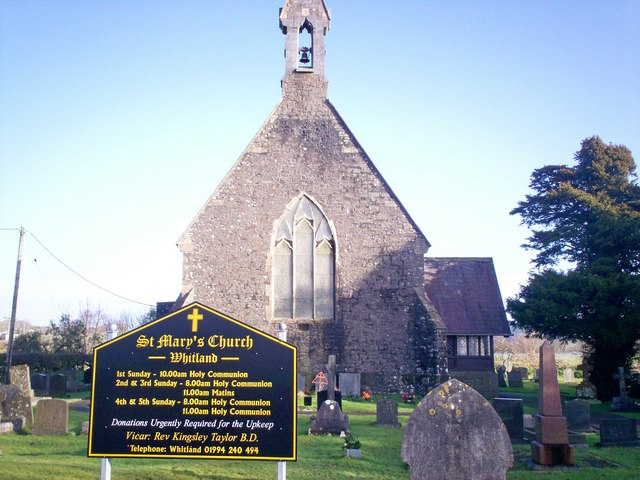
St Mary's Church

An electoral ward of the same name exists including the Henllanfallteg community with a total population of 2,272. The ward elects one county councillor to Carmarthenshire County Council.

Whitland also has a town council, consisting of elected or co-opted town councillors. The town council elects a mayor annually, who acts as chair of the council.

== Railway ==
Whitland railway station is at the junction of the South Wales Main Line with two branch lines: Pembroke Dock, and Cardigan. The latter was closed as a result of the Beeching cuts in the early 1960s.

== Education ==
There are two schools: the primary school is Ysgol Llys Hywel; the secondary is Dyffryn Taf. Whitland has many local sporting teams including Rugby union, football (soccer), cricket, short and long mat bowls, darts and billiards.

== Notable people ==
- William Mathias (1934–1992), composer, was born in Whitland.
- Lorys Davies (1936–2021), Archdeacon of Bolton from 1992 until 2001.
