= List of places in Pembrokeshire (categorised) =

This is a categorised list of places in the administrative county of Pembrokeshire.

== Administrative divisions ==
=== County electoral wards ===
This is a list of electoral wards to Pembrokeshire County Council:

- Amroth and Saundersfoot North
- Boncath and Clydau
- Bro Gwaun
- Burton
- Camrose
- Carew and Jeffreyston
- Cilgerran and Eglwyswrw
- Crymych and Maenachlog-ddu
- East Williamston
- Fishguard North East
- Fishguard North West
- Goodwick
- Haverfordwest Castle
- Haverfordwest Garth
- Haverfordwest Portfield
- Haverfordwest Prendergast
- Haverfordwest Priory
- Hundleton
- Johnston
- Kilgetty and Begelly
- Lampeter Velfrey
- Lamphey
- Letterston
- Llangwm
- Llanrhian
- Maenclochog
- Manorbier and Penally
- Martletwy
- Merlin's Bridge
- Milford Central (Milford Haven)
- Milford East
- Milford Hakin
- Milford Hubberston
- Milford North
- Milford West
- Narberth
- Narberth Rural
- Newport and Dinas
- Neyland East
- Neyland West
- Pembroke Monkton and St Mary South
- Pembroke St Mary North
- Pembroke St Michael
- Pembroke Dock Bufferland
- Pembroke Dock Bush
- Pembroke Dock Central
- Pembroke Dock Market
- Pembroke Dock Pennar
- Rudbaxton
- Saundersfoot South
- Solva
- St David's
- St. Dogmaels
- St Florence and St Mary Out Liberty
- St. Ishmael's
- Tenby North
- Tenby South
- The Havens
- Wiston

=== Communities ===
This is a list of communities

- Ambleston
- Amroth
- Angle
- Boncath
- Brawdy
- Burton
- Camrose
- Carew
- Cilgerran
- Clydau
- Clynderwen
- Cosheston
- Crymych
- Cwm Gwaun
- Dale
- Dinas Cross
- East Williamston
- Eglwyswrw
- Fishguard
- Freystrop
- Goodwick
- Haverfordwest
- Hayscastle
- Herbrandston
- Hook
- Hundleton
- Jeffreyston
- Johnston
- Kilgetty/Begelly
- Lampeter Velfrey
- Lamphey
- Letterston
- Llanddewi Velfrey
- Llandissilio West
- Llangwm
- Llanrhian
- Llanstadwell
- Llanteg
- Llawhaden
- Maenclochog
- Manorbier
- Manordeifi
- Marloes and St. Brides
- Martletwy
- Mathry
- Merlin's Bridge
- Milford Haven
- Mynachlog-ddu
- Narberth
- Nevern
- New Moat
- Newport
- Neyland
- Nolton and Roch
- Pembroke
- Pembroke Dock
- Penally
- Pencaer
- Puncheston
- Rosemarket
- Rudbaxton
- Saundersfoot
- Scleddau
- Solva
- Spittal
- St David's and the Cathedral Close
- St. Dogmaels
- St. Florence
- St. Ishmael's
- St. Mary Out Liberty
- Stackpole and Castlemartin
- Templeton
- Tenby
- The Havens
- Tiers Cross
- Trecwn
- Uzmaston, Boulston and Slebech
- Walwyn's Castle
- Wiston
- Wolfscastle

== Principal towns ==
- Haverfordwest
- Milford Haven
- Narberth
- Newport
- Neyland
- Pembroke
- Pembroke Dock
- St David's (city status)
- Tenby
- Fishguard

== Visitor attractions ==
- Blue Lagoon waterpark
- Bluestone holiday village
- Manor House Wildlife Park
- Oakwood Theme Park
- Pembrokeshire Motor Museum

== Geographical ==
=== Islands ===
- Caldey Island
- Grassholm Island
- Ramsey Island
- Skokholm Island
- Skomer Island

=== Rivers and waterways ===
- Carew River
- Cresswell River
- Daugleddau
- River Gwaun
- River Nevern
- River Syfynwy
- River Teifi

- Broad Haven
- Broad Haven South (near Bosherston)
- Little Haven (to the south of Broad Haven)
- Freshwater East
- Freshwater West

=== Parkland ===
- Pembrokeshire Coast National Park

=== Hills and mountains ===
- Preseli Hills

== Historical and archaeological places ==
- St David's Cathedral
- St Davids Head

=== Castles ===
- Carew Castle
- Cilgerran Castle
- Cresswell Castle
- Haverfordwest Castle
- Llawhaden Castle
- Manorbier Castle
- Pembroke Castle
- Picton Castle
- Roch Castle
- Tenby Castle
- Wiston Castle

== Transport ==
=== Airports ===
- Haverfordwest Aerodrome
- Pembrey Airport

=== Footpaths and cycleways ===
- Celtic Trail cycle route (part of NCR 4)

=== Roads ===
- A477 road
- A478 road
- A487 road
- A4076 road
- B4329 road

=== Railway lines ===
- West Wales Line

=== Railway stations ===
- Clarbeston Road railway station
- Clunderwen railway station
- Fishguard Harbour railway station
- Fishguard & Goodwick railway station
- Haverfordwest railway station
- Johnston railway station
- Kilgetty railway station
- Lamphey railway station
- Manorbier railway station
- Milford Haven railway station
- Narberth railway station
- Pembroke Dock railway station
- Pembroke railway station
- Penally railway station
- Saundersfoot railway station
- Tenby railway station

=== Shipping ===
- Fishguard
- Milford Haven (harbour)
- Pembroke Dock

=== Lighthouses ===
- Caldey Lighthouse
- Skokholm Lighthouse
- Smalls Lighthouse
- South Bishop Lighthouse
- St. Ann's Head Lighthouse
- Strumble Head Lighthouse

== See also ==
- List of places in Pembrokeshire for an alphabetical list of cities, towns and villages.
- Pembrokeshire
