= List of electoral wards in Pembrokeshire =

Electoral wards 2011–2022

This list of electoral wards in Pembrokeshire includes council wards, which elect councillors to Pembrokeshire County Council and community wards, which elect councillors to community councils.

The county is divided into 59 electoral divisions, all except one returning one councillor. Some of these divisions are coterminous with communities (civil parishes) of the same name. Most communities have their own elected council (indicated by '*'). There are ten town councils and 52 community councils in the county.

== Current wards ==
Since the 2022 local elections the county has been divided into 59 electoral divisions, electing 60 councillors. The following table lists ward divisions and associated communities (including community councillors):

County ward	County councillors	Communities	Community wards	Community councillors
Amroth and Saundersfoot North	1	Amroth*	Amroth; Crunwere	9; 3
Amroth and Saundersfoot North	1	Saundersfoot* (part)		
Boncath and Clydau	1	Boncath*; Clydau*; Manordeifi*		
Bro Gwaun	1	Cwm Gwaun*		
Bro Gwaun	1	Puncheston*	Puncheston; Henry's Moat	
Bro Gwaun	1	Scleddau*	Scleddau North; Scleddau South; Trecwn	
Burton	1	Burton*; Rosemarket*		
Camrose ^{c}	1	Camrose*		
Carew and Jeffreyston	1	Carew*; Jeffreyston*		
Cilgerran and Eglwyswrw	1	Cilgerran*; Eglwyswrw*		
Crymych and Maenachlog-ddu	1	Crymych*; Mynachlog-ddu*		
East Williamston	1	East Williamston*		
Fishguard North East	1	Fishguard and Goodwick Town* (part)	Fishguard North East	5
Fishguard North West	1	Fishguard and Goodwick Town* (part)	Fishguard North West	4
Goodwick	1	Fishguard and Goodwick Town* (part)	Goodwick	4
Haverfordwest Castle	1	Haverfordwest Town* (part)	Castle	3
Haverfordwest Garth	1	Haverfordwest Town* (part)	Garth	3
Haverfordwest Portfield	1	Haverfordwest Town* (part)	Portfield	4
Haverfordwest Prendergast	1	Haverfordwest Town* (part)	Prendergast	3
Haverfordwest Priory	1	Haverfordwest Town* (part)	Priory	4
Hundleton	1	Angle*; Hundleton*; Stackpole and Castlemartin*		
Johnston	1	Johnston*; Tiers Cross*		
Kilgetty and Begelly	1	Kilgetty/Begelly*		
Lampeter Velfrey	1	Lampeter Velfrey*; Llanddewi Velfrey*		
Lamphey	1	Cosheston*; Lamphey*		
Letterston	1	Hayscastle*; Letterston*; Wolfscastle*		
Llangwm	1	Freystrop*; Hook*; Llangwm*		
Llanrhian	1	Llanrhian*; Mathry*		
Llanrhian	1	Pencaer*	Llanwnda; St Nicholas	3; 3
Maenclochog	1	Clynderwen; Llandissilio West*; Maenclochog*		
Manorbier and Penally	1	Manorbier*; Penally*		
Martletwy	1	Llawhaden*; Martletwy*; Uzmaston, Boulston and Slebech*		
Merlin's Bridge ^{c}	1	Merlin's Bridge		
Milford Central	1	Milford Haven Town* (part)	Central	3
Milford East	1	Milford Haven Town* (part)	East	3
Milford Hakin	1	Milford Haven Town* (part)	Hakin	3
Milford Hubberston	1	Milford Haven Town* (part)	Hubberston	3
Milford North	1	Milford Haven Town* (part)	North	3
Milford West	1	Milford Haven Town* (part)	West	3
Narberth	1	Narberth Town*	Narberth Urban	10
Narberth Rural	1	Narberth Town*	Narberth Rural	2
Narberth Rural	1	Templeton*	Templeton	9
Newport and Dinas	1	Dinas Cross*		
Newport and Dinas	1	Newport Town*		11
Neyland East	1	Neyland Town* (East ward)		
Neyland West	1	Llanstadwell*; Neyland Town* (West ward)		
Pembroke Monkton and St Mary South	2	Pembroke Town* (part)	Monkton	3
Pembroke Monkton and St Mary South	2	Pembroke Town* (part)	South	4
Pembroke Monkton and St Mary South	2	Pembroke Town* (part)	St Michael (part)	
Pembroke St Mary North	1	Pembroke Town* (part)	North	4
Pembroke St Michael	1	Pembroke Town* (part)	St Michael (part)	4
Pembroke Dock Bufferland	1	Pembroke Dock Town* (part)	Pennar (part)	
Pembroke Dock Bush	1	Pembroke Dock Town* (part)	Llanion	5
Pembroke Dock Central	1	Pembroke Dock Town* (part)	Central	3
Pembroke Dock Market	1	Pembroke Dock Town* (part)	Market	5
Pembroke Dock Pennar	1	Pembroke Dock Town* (part)	Pennar (part)	3
Rudbaxton ^{c}	1	Rudbaxton*		
Saundersfoot South	1	Saundersfoot* (part)		12
Solva	1	Brawdy*; Solva*		
St David's	1	St. Davids and the Cathedral Close*		12
St. Dogmaels	1	Nevern*; St. Dogmaels*		
St Florence and St Mary Out Liberty	1	St. Mary Out Liberty*; St. Florence*		
St Ishmael's	1	Dale*; Herbrandston*; Marloes and St. Brides*; St Ishmael's*; Walwyn's Castle*		
Tenby North	1	Tenby Town* (part)	Tenby North	8
Tenby South	1	Tenby Town* (part)	Tenby South	7
The Havens	1	Nolton and Roch*; The Havens*		
Wiston	1	Ambleston*; New Moat*; Spittal*; Wiston*		

== 2021 boundary review ==
A number of ward boundary changes were made following a review by the Local Government Boundary Commission for Wales. 29 of the existing wards remained unchanged although there were some changes to ward names. The overall number of wards was reduced from 60 to 59, with one 2-member ward.

Other ward changes

Of the remaining wards:

- The existing Llanrhian ward consisting of the communities of Llanrhian and Mathry together with the community of Pencaer (previously in the Scleddau ward) were combined to create a new electoral ward named Llanrhian.
- The communities of Cwm Gwaun and Puncheston (previously in the Dinas Cross ward) and the community of Scleddau (previously in the Scleddau ward) were combined to create a new electoral ward named Bro Gwaun.
- The existing Newport ward was combined with the community of Dinas Cross to create a new electoral ward named Newport and Dinas.

(The above changes result in a net loss of one seat in this part of the county)

- The communities of Cilgerran and Eglwyswrw were combined to create a new electoral ward named Cilgerran
- The existing Clydau ward consisting of the communities of Boncath and Clydau with the community of Manordeifi (previously in the Cilgerran ward) were combined to create a new electoral ward named Boncath and Clydau.
- The communities of Crymych and Mynachlog-ddu (previously in the Maenclochog ward) were combined to create a new ward named Crymych and Mynachlog-ddu.
- The existing Maenclochog ward was replaced by a new ward of the same name comprising the communities of Clunderwen, Llandissilio West and Maenclochog but the communities of Mynachlog-ddu and New Moat were moved to other wards.
- The existing Wiston ward was replaced by a new ward of the same name. It continued to include the communities of Ambleston and Wiston and the community of New Moat was added. The community of Spittal was moved to another ward.
- The existing Rudbaxton ward was combined with the community of Spittal (previously in the Wiston ward) to create a new electoral ward named Rudbaxton and Spittal.

(The number of seats in this part of the county remained unchanged)

- The existing Camrose ward was replaced with a new ward of the same ward comprising only the community of Camrose.
- The existing The Havens ward was replaced by a ward of the same name including the communities of Nolton and Roch (previously in the Camrose ward) and The Havens.
- The existing St Ishmaels ward consisting of the communities of Dale, Herbrandston, Marloes and St Brides and St Ishmaels, together with the communities of Tiers Cross and Walwyn's Castle were combined to create a new electoral ward named St Ishmaels.
- The existing Johnston ward was replaced with a new ward of the same ward comprising only the community of Johnston.

(The number of seats in this part of the county remained unchanged)

- In Milford Haven, a number of limited changes were made to ward boundaries, but the five wards continued to elect one councillor each.
- The existing Pembroke Dock Pennar ward was divided to create two new wards, named Pembroke Dock: Pennar and Pembroke Dock: Bufferland.
- The boundaries of the existing Pembroke Dock Central and Pembroke Dock Llanion were amended to create two new wards, named Pembroke Dock: Bush and Pembroke Dock: Central
- The existing Pembroke Monkton and Pembroke St Mary South wards together with part of the Pembroke St Michael ward were merged to create a new two member ward named Pembroke: Monkton and St Mary South.
- The existing Pembroke St Michael ward was replaced with a new ward of the same name, but with part of the ward transferred to Pembroke: Monkton and St Mary South.

(There was an increase of one in the number of seats in this part of the county)

- The existing Manorbier ward, minus a part of the community of St Florence, was combined with the community of Penally to create a new electoral ward named Manorbier and Penally.
- The communities of St Florence and St Mary Out Liberty were combined to create a new electoral ward named St Florence and St Mary Out Liberty.
- The existing Amroth ward was combined with the northern part of the Saundersfoot ward to create a new electoral ward named Amroth and Saundersfoot North.
- The remainder of the Saundersfoot ward would form a new electoral ward named Saundersfoot South.
- The existing Carew ward was combined with the community of Jeffreyston (previously in East Williamston ward) to create a new electoral ward named Carew and Jeffreyston.
- The existing East Williamston ward was replaced by a ward of the same name minus the community of Jeffreyston.

== Pre-2022 wards ==
Prior to the 2022 local elections the county was divided into 60 electoral divisions, each returning one councillor. The following table lists council divisions and associated communities:

County ward	County councillors	Communities	Community wards
Amroth ^{c}	1	Amroth*	Amroth; Crunwere
Burton	1	Burton*; Rosemarket*	
Camrose	1	Camrose*; Nolton and Roch*	
Carew ^{c}	1	Carew*	
Cilgerran	1	Cilgerran*; Manordeifi*	
Clydau	1	Boncath*; Clydau*	
Crymych	1	Crymych*; Eglwyswrw*	
Dinas Cross	1	Cwm Gwaun*; Dinas Cross*; Puncheston*	
East Williamston	1	East Williamston*; Jeffreyston*	
Fishguard North East	1	Fishguard and Goodwick Town* (part)	Fishguard North East
Fishguard North West	1	Fishguard and Goodwick Town* (part)	Fishguard North West
Goodwick	1	Fishguard and Goodwick Town* (part)	Goodwick
Haverfordwest Castle	1	Haverfordwest Town* (part)	Castle
Haverfordwest Garth	1	Haverfordwest Town* (part)	Garth
Haverfordwest Portfield	1	Haverfordwest Town* (part)	Portfield
Haverfordwest Prendergast	1	Haverfordwest Town* (part)	Prendergast
Haverfordwest Priory	1	Haverfordwest Town* (part)	Priory
Hundleton	1	Angle*; Hundleton*; Stackpole and Castlemartin*	
Johnston	1	Johnston*; Tiers Cross*	
Kilgetty/Begelly ^{c}	1	Kilgetty/Begelly*	
Lampeter Velfrey	1	Lampeter Velfrey*; Llanddewi Velfrey*	
Lamphey	1	Cosheston*; Lamphey*	
Letterston	1	Hayscastle*; Letterston*; Wolfscastle*	
Llangwm	1	Freystrop*; Hook*; Llangwm*	
Llanrhian	1	Llanrhian*; Mathry*	
Maenclochog	1	Clynderwen; Llandissilio West*; Maenclochog*; Mynachlog-ddu*; New Moat*	
Manorbier	1	Manorbier*; St. Florence* (St. Florence ward)	
Martletwy ^{u11}	1	Llawhaden*; Martletwy*; Uzmaston, Boulston and Slebech* ^{u11}	
Merlin's Bridge ^{c}	1	Merlin's Bridge	
Milford Central	1	Milford Haven Town* (part)	Central
Milford East	1	Milford Haven Town* (part)	East
Milford Hakin	1	Milford Haven Town* (part)	Hakin
Milford Hubberston	1	Milford Haven Town* (part)	Hubberston
Milford North	1	Milford Haven Town* (part)	North
Milford West	1	Milford Haven Town* (part)	West
Narberth	1	Narberth Town*	Narberth Urban
Narberth Rural	1	Narberth Town*	Narberth Rural
Narberth Rural	1	Templeton*	Templeton
Newport ^{c}	1	Newport Town*	
Neyland East	1	Neyland Town* (East ward)	
Neyland West	1	Llanstadwell*; Neyland Town* (West ward)	
Pembroke Monkton	1	Pembroke Town* (part)	
Pembroke St Mary North	1	Pembroke Town* (part)	
Pembroke St Mary South	1	Pembroke Town* (part)	
Pembroke St Michael	1	Pembroke Town* (part)	
Pembroke Dock Central	1	Pembroke Dock Town* (part)	Central
Pembroke Dock Llanion	1	Pembroke Dock Town* (part)	Llanion
Pembroke Dock Market	1	Pembroke Dock Town* (part)	Market
Pembroke Dock Pennar	1	Pembroke Dock Town* (part)	Pennar
Penally	1	Penally*; St. Mary Out Liberty*; St. Florence* (Gumfreston ward)	
Rudbaxton ^{c} ^{u11}	1	Rudbaxton*	
Saundersfoot ^{c}	1	Saundersfoot*	
Scleddau	1	Pencaer*	Llanwnda; St Nicholas
Scleddau	1	Scleddau*	Scleddau North; Scleddau South; Trecwn
Solva	1	Brawdy*; Solva*	
St David's	1	St. Davids and the Cathedral Close*	
St. Dogmaels	1	Nevern*; St. Dogmaels*	
St Ishmael's	1	Dale*; Herbrandston*; Marloes and St. Brides*; St Ishmael's*	
Tenby North	1	Tenby Town* (part)	Tenby North
Tenby South	1	Tenby Town* (part)	Tenby South
The Havens	1	The Havens*; Walwyn's Castle*	
Wiston	1	Ambleston*; Spittal*; Wiston*	

* = Communities which elect a community council
^{c} = Ward coterminous with community of the same name
^{u11} = Uzmaston and Boulston community included in Rudbaxton ward prior to 2011. Uzmaston and Boulston combined with Slebech community in 2011 and joined Martletwy ward

== See also ==
- List of places in Pembrokeshire (categorised)
