= 2022 Pembrokeshire County Council election =

2022 Welsh local government election

- 5 May 2022

All 60 seats to Pembrokeshire County Council 31 seats needed for a majority

	First party	Second party	Third party
Party	Independent	Conservative	Labour
Seats won	35	11	10
Popular vote	14,663	5,364	4,204
Percentage	51.6%	18.9%	16.6%
	Fourth party	Fifth party
Party	Plaid Cymru	Liberal Democrats
Seats won	2	2
Popular vote	2,628	1,261
Percentage	9.2%	4.4%

The 2022 election to Pembrokeshire County Council took place on 5 May 2022 to elect 60 members to Pembrokeshire County Council, as part of wider local elections across Wales and the UK. The election was preceded by the 2017 election. It will be followed by the 2027 election.

== Boundary changes ==
A number of boundary changes took place following a review by the Local Government Boundary Commission for Wales. 29 of the existing 60 wards remained unchanged although there were some changes to ward names.

Of the remaining wards:

- The existing Llanrhian ward consisting of the communities of Llanrhian and Mathry together with the community of Pencaer (previously in the Scleddau ward) were combined to create a new electoral ward named Llanrhian.
- The communities of Cwm Gwaun and Puncheston (previously in the Dinas Cross ward) and the community of Scleddau (previously in the Scleddau ward) were combined to create a new electoral ward named Bro Gwaun.
- The existing Newport ward was combined with the community of Dinas Cross to create a new electoral ward named Newport and Dinas.

The above changes result in a net loss of one seat in this part of the county.

- The communities of Cilgerran and Eglwyswrw were combined to create a new electoral ward named Cilgerran
- The existing Clydau ward consisting of the communities of Boncath and Clydau with the community of Manordeifi (previously in the Cilgerran ward) were combined to create a new electoral ward named Boncath and Clydau.
- The communities of Crymych and Mynachlog-ddu (previously in the Maenclochog ward) were combined to create a new ward named Crymych and Mynachlog-ddu.
- The existing Maenclochog ward was replaced by a new ward of the same name comprising the communities of Clunderwen, Llandissilio West and Maenclochog but the communities of Mynachlog-ddu and New Moat were moved to other wards.
- The existing Wiston ward was replaced by a new ward of the same name. It continued to include the communities of Ambleston and Wiston and the community of New Moat was added. The community of Spittal was moved to another ward.
- The existing Rudbaxton ward was combined with the community of Spittal (previously in the Wiston ward) to create a new electoral ward named Rudbaxton and Spittal.

The number of seats in this part of the county remained unchanged.

- The existing Camrose ward was replaced with a new ward of the same ward comprising only the community of Camrose.
- The existing The Havens ward was replaced by a ward of the same name including the communities of Nolton and Roch (previously in the Camrose ward) and The Havens.
- The existing St Ishmaels ward consisting of the communities of Dale, Herbrandston, Marloes and St Brides and St Ishmaels, together with the communities of Tiers Cross and Walwyn's Castle were combined to create a new electoral ward named St Ishmaels.
- The existing Johnston ward was replaced with a new ward of the same ward comprising only the community of Johnston.

The number of seats in this part of the county remained unchanged.

- In Milford Haven, a number of limited changes were made to ward boundaries, but the five wards continued to elect one councillor each.
- The existing Pembroke Dock Pennar ward was divided to create two new wards, named Pembroke Dock: Pennar and Pembroke Dock: Bufferland.
- The boundaries of the existing Pembroke Dock Central and Pembroke Dock Llanion were amended to create two new wards, named Pembroke Dock: Bush and Pembroke Dock: Central
- The existing Pembroke Monkton and Pembroke St Mary South wards together with part of the Pembroke St Michael ward were merged to create a new two member ward named Pembroke: Monkton and St Mary South.
- The existing Pembroke St Michael ward was replaced with a new ward of the same name, but with part of the ward transferred to Pembroke: Monkton and St Mary South.

There was an increase of one in the number of seats in this part of the county.

- The existing Manorbier ward, minus a part of the community of St Florence, was combined with the community of Penally to create a new electoral ward named Manorbier and Penally.
- The communities of St Florence and St Mary Out Liberty were combined to create a new electoral ward named St Florence and St Mary Out Liberty.
- The existing Amroth ward was combined with the northern part of the Saundersfoot ward to create a new electoral ward named Amroth and Saundersfoot North.
- The remainder of the Saundersfoot ward would form a new electoral ward named Saundersfoot South.
- The existing Carew ward was combined with the community of Jeffreyston (previously in East Williamston ward) to create a new electoral ward named Carew and Jeffreyston.
- The existing East Williamston ward was replaced by a ward of the same name minus the community of Jeffreyston.

== Candidates ==
Nineteen seats (out of the sixty available) had candidates elected unopposed. All nineteen unopposed candidates were members of the previous council.

== Result overview ==
2022 Pembrokeshire local election result
Party	Seats	Gains	Losses	Net gain/loss	Seats %	Votes %	Votes	+/−
Independent	35				58.3	51.6	14,663	
Conservative	11				18.3	18.9	5,364	
Labour	10				16.6	14.8	4,204	
Plaid Cymru	2				3.3	9.2	2,628	
Liberal Democrats	2	2	1	▲1	3.3	4.4	1,261	
Green	0	0	0	0	0.0	0.8	237	
Propel	0	0	0	0	0.0	0.0	14	
Total	60						28,371	

== Ward results ==
Nominations closed on 5 April 2022. The results were counted on 6 May 2022.

=== Amroth and Saundersfoot North ===
Amroth and Saundersfoot North 2022
Party	Candidate	Votes	%	±%
Liberal Democrats	Alec Cormack	466	58.3	
Conservative	Tony Barron*	256	32.0	
Green	Leigh McShane	78	9.8	
Majority				
Liberal Democrats win (new seat)				

=== Boncath and Clydau ===
Boncath and Clydau 2022
Party	Candidate	Votes	%	±%
Independent	Iwan Stuart Ward	464	52.1	
Plaid Cymru	Hedd Harries	426	47.9	
Majority				
Independent win (new seat)				

=== Bro Gwaun ===
Bro Gwaun 2022
Party	Candidate	Votes	%	±%
Independent	Delme Harries	340	52.3	
Liberal Democrats	Bob Kilmister*	310	47.7	
Majority		30		
Independent win (new seat)				

=== Burton ===
Burton 2022
Party	Candidate	Votes	%	±%
Conservative	Danny Young	399	61.8	
Independent	Robin Howells	247	38.2	
Majority				
Conservative hold				

=== Camrose ===
Camrose 2022
Party	Candidate	Votes	%	±%
Independent	James Llewellyn Adams*	537	77.3	
Labour	Julian Rutter	158	22.7	
Majority				
Independent win (new seat)				

=== Carew and Jeffreyston ===
Carew and Jeffreyston 2022
Party	Candidate	Votes	%	±%
Independent	Vanessa Thomas	433	60.4	
Independent	James Harrison-Allen	173	24.1	
Independent	Peter Vincent Everall	111	15.5	
Majority				
Independent win (new seat)				

=== Cilgerran and Eglwyswrw ===
Cilgerran and Eglwyswrw 2022
Party	Candidate	Votes	%	±%
Independent	John Thomas Davies*	Unopposed		
Independent win (new seat)				

=== Crymych and Mynachlog-Ddu ===
Crymych and Mynachlog-Ddu 2022
Party	Candidate	Votes	%	±%
Independent	Shon Midway Rees	561	53.7	
Plaid Cymru	Cristoffer Wyn Tomos*	484	46.3	
Majority				
Independent win (new seat)				

=== East Williamston ===
East Williamston 2022
Party	Candidate	Votes	%	±%
Independent	Jacob John Williams*	Unopposed		
Independent win (new seat)				

=== Fishguard North East ===
Fishguard North East 2022
Party	Candidate	Votes	%	±%
Labour	Jordan Paul Ryan	399	58.9	
Conservative	Brian Murphy	278	41.1	
Majority				
Labour gain from Independent		Swing		

=== Fishguard North West ===
Fishguard North West 2022
Party	Candidate	Votes	%	±%
Independent	Pat Davies*	Unopposed		
Independent hold		Swing		

=== Goodwick ===
Goodwick 2022
Party	Candidate	Votes	%	±%
Labour	Nicola Gwynn	354	47.1	
Independent	Peter Martin John	339	45.1	
Conservative	Lynn Porter	59	7.8	
Majority				
Labour gain from Independent		Swing		

=== Haverfordwest: Castle ===
Haverfordwest: Castle 2022
Party	Candidate	Votes	%	±%
Labour	Thomas Baden Tudor*	531	78.0	
Conservative	Sue McKeeman	150	22.0	
Majority				
Labour hold		Swing		

=== Haverfordwest Garth ===
Haverfordwest Garth 2022
Party	Candidate	Votes	%	±%
Independent	Anji Tinley	311	72.3	
Conservative	Jonathan Twigg	119	27.7	
Majority				
Independent hold		Swing		

=== Haverfordwest Portfield ===
Haverfordwest Portfield 2022
Party	Candidate	Votes	%	±%
Independent	Tim Evans*	Unopposed		
Independent hold		Swing		

=== Haverfordwest Prendergast ===
Haverfordwest Prendergast 2022
Party	Candidate	Votes	%	±%
Conservative	Andrew Edwards	391	58.6	
Labour	Philippa Ann Thomson	276	41.4	
Majority				
Conservative gain from Labour		Swing		

=== Haverfordwest Priory ===
Haverfordwest Priory 2022
Party	Candidate	Votes	%	±%
Conservative	David Michael Bryan*	Unopposed		
Conservative hold				

=== Hundleton ===
Hundleton 2022
Party	Candidate	Votes	%	±%
Independent	Steve Alderman	348	56.9	
Independent	Julie Sharon Cooper	264	43.1	
Majority				
Independent hold		Swing		

=== Johnston ===
Johnston 2022
Party	Candidate	Votes	%	±%
Conservative	Aled Thomas	229	37.9	
Labour	Daniel Metcalf	226	37.4	
Independent	John William Gray	149	24.7	
Majority				
Conservative win (new seat)				

=== Kilgetty and Begelly ===
Kilgetty and Begelly 2022
Party	Candidate	Votes	%	±%
Liberal Democrats	Alistair Ronald Cameron	397	52.2	
Plaid Cymru	Peter John Adams	122	16.0	
Independent	David John Pugh*	115	15.1	
Independent	Paul Wyatt	85	11.2	
Independent	Chris Ebrey	28	3.7	
Propel	Gretta Marshall	14	1.8	
Majority				
Liberal Democrats gain from Independent		Swing		

=== Lampeter Velfrey ===
Lampeter Velfrey 2022
Party	Candidate	Votes	%	±%
Independent	David Simpson*	355	66.9	
Conservative	Lizzie Lesnianski	176	33.1	
Majority				
Independent hold				

=== Lamphey ===
Lamphey 2022
Party	Candidate	Votes	%	±%
Independent	Tessa Hodgson*	466	76.0	
Conservative	Josh Carey	147	24.0	
Majority				
Independent hold		Swing		

=== Letterston ===
Letterston 2022
Party	Candidate	Votes	%	±%
Independent	Michelle Elizabeth Bateman*	Unopposed		
Independent hold		Swing		

=== Llangwm ===
Llangwm 2022
Party	Candidate	Votes	%	±%
Independent	Michael James John*	466	53.3	
Independent	Dave Golding	409	46.7	
Majority				
Independent hold		Swing		

=== Llanrhian ===
Llanrhian 2022
Party	Candidate	Votes	%	±%
Independent	Neil David Prior	670	91.2	
Independent	Rob Smith	65	8.8	
Majority				
Independent win (new seat)				

=== Maenclochog ===
Maenclochog 2022
Party	Candidate	Votes	%	±%
Independent	Simon Mark Wright	505	58.0	
Plaid Cymru	Hefin Wyn	188	21.6	
Labour	Ben Levy	177	20.3	
Majority				
Independent win (new seat)				

=== Manorbier and Penally ===
Manorbier and Penally 2022
Party	Candidate	Votes	%	±%
Independent	Philip Kidney*	540	75.9	
Plaid Cymru	Steve Thomas	171	24.1	
Majority				
Independent win (new seat)				

=== Martletwy ===
Martletwy 2022
Party	Candidate	Votes	%	±%
Conservative	Di Clements*	Unopposed		
Conservative hold				

=== Merlin’s Bridge ===
Merlin's Bridge 2022
Party	Candidate	Votes	%	±%
Independent	Vincent John Cole*	Unopposed		
Independent hold		Swing		

=== Milford Central ===
Milford Central 2022
Party	Candidate	Votes	%	±%
Independent	Terry Davies	147	29.8	
Conservative	Anthony Powell	135	27.4	
Independent	Tom Sinclair	109	22.1	
Independent	Martin Jones	102	20.7	
Majority				
Independent hold		Swing		

=== Milford East ===
Milford East 2022
Party	Candidate	Votes	%	±%
Labour	Guy Woodham*	Unopposed		
Labour hold				

=== Milford Hakin ===
Milford Hakin 2022
Party	Candidate	Votes	%	±%
Independent	Robert Michael Stoddart*	286	48.7	
Independent	Duncan Ritchie Edwards	176	30.0	
Conservative	Lee Bridges	125	21.3	
Majority				
Independent hold		Swing		

=== Milford Hubberston ===
Milford Hubberston 2022
Party	Candidate	Votes	%	±%
Independent	Vivien Stoddart*	Unopposed		
Independent hold				

=== Milford North ===
Milford North 2022
Party	Candidate	Votes	%	±%
Independent	Alan Dennison	333	52.9	
Conservative	Bill Abbott	296	47.1	
Majority				
Independent gain from Conservative		Swing		

=== Milford West ===
Milford West 2022
Party	Candidate	Votes	%	±%
Plaid Cymru	David Rhys Sinnett*	325	69.0	
Independent	Stephen Glanville Joseph*	146	31.0	
Majority				
Plaid Cymru hold		Swing		

=== Narberth ===
Narberth 2022
Party	Candidate	Votes	%	±%
Labour	Marc Tierney	514	65.6	
Independent	Victoria McAndrew	177	34.4	
Majority				
Labour hold		Swing		

=== Narberth Rural ===
Narberth Rural 2022
Party	Candidate	Votes	%	±%
Independent	Elwyn Albert Morse*	Unopposed		
Independent hold				

=== Newport and Dinas ===
Newport and Dinas 2022
Party	Candidate	Votes	%	±%
Independent	Huw Thomas Murphy	325	38.4	
Independent	Jano Williams	279	32.9	
Plaid Cymru	Maya Rebecca Donnelly	243	28.7	
Independent win (new seat)				

=== Neyland East ===
Neyland East 2022
Party	Candidate	Votes	%	±%
Labour	Simon Leslie Hancock*	Unopposed	N/A	N/A
Labour hold				

=== Neyland West ===
Neyland West 2022
Party	Candidate	Votes	%	±%
Labour	Paul Nigel Miller*	Unopposed		
Labour hold				

=== Pembroke Monkton and St Mary South (two seats) ===
Pembroke Monkton and St Mary South 2022
Party	Candidate	Votes	%	±%
Conservative	Aaron Leigh Carey*	362	34.8	
Conservative	Jonathan Grimes	293	28.2	
Labour	David William Edwards	265	25.5	
Independent	Daphne Margaret Jane Bush	227	21.8	
Independent	Jonathan Anthony Robert Nutting	219	21.1	
Labour	Marcel Louis Laval	201	19.3	
Independent	Reginald Thomas Ebrey	159	15.3	
Liberal Democrats	Lee Herring	88	8.5	
Conservative win (new seat)				
Conservative win (new seat)				

=== Pembroke St Mary North ===
Pembroke St Mary North 2022
Party	Candidate	Votes	%	±%
Independent	Jon Harvey	404	71.8	
Conservative	Deborah Carne Willocks	159	28.2	
Majority				
Independent hold		Swing		

=== Pembroke St Michael ===
Pembroke St Michael 2022
Party	Candidate	Votes	%	±%
Independent	Melanie Anne Phillips	418	52.7	
Conservative	Aden Arthur Brinn*	375	47.3	
Majority				
Independent gain from Conservative		Swing		

=== Pembroke Dock, Bufferland ===
Pembroke Dock, Bufferland 2022
Party	Candidate	Votes	%	±%
Independent	Michelle Wiggins	240	63.2	
Independent	Gordon Goff	76	20.0	
Independent	Billy Gannon	64	16.8	
Majority				
Independent win (new seat)				

=== Pembroke Dock, Bush ===
Pembroke Dock, Bush 2022
Party	Candidate	Votes	%	±%
Labour	Maureen Bowen	173	42.1	
Independent	Sarah Jane Harvey	154	37.5	
Independent	Paul Haywood Dowson*	84	20.4	
Majority				
Labour win (new seat)				

=== Pembroke Dock, Central ===
Pembroke Dock, Central 2022
Party	Candidate	Votes	%	±%
Labour	Joshua Beynon*	376	64.4	+28.6
Conservative	Rhian Cowen	148	25.3	
Independent	George Frederick Manning	60	10.3	+5
Majority		228	39.1	
Labour hold		Swing	28.6	

=== Pembroke Dock, Market ===
Pembroke Dock, Market 2022
Party	Candidate	Votes	%	±%
Independent	Brian John Hall*	Unopposed		
Independent hold				

=== Pembroke Dock, Pennar ===
Pembroke Dock, Pennar 2022
Party	Candidate	Votes	%	±%
Labour	Anthony Wilcox*	Unopposed		
Labour hold				

=== Rudbaxton and Spittal ===
Rudbaxton and Spittal 2022
Party	Candidate	Votes	%	±%
Conservative	Steve Yelland*	Unopposed		
Conservative win (new seat)				

=== St David's ===
St David's 2022
Party	Candidate	Votes	%	±%
Independent	Bethan Price	283	37.4	
Independent	David Gareth Beechey Lloyd*	250	33.0	
Labour	Rachel Hurdley	181	23.9	
Green	Keith Missen	43	5.7	
Majority				
Independent hold		Swing		

=== St Dogmaels ===
St Dogmaels 2022
Party	Candidate	Votes	%	±%
Independent	David Griffith Michael James*	Unopposed		
Independent hold				

=== St Florence and St Mary Out Liberty ===
St Florence and St Mary Out Liberty 2022
Party	Candidate	Votes	%	±%
Conservative	Rhys Jordan	315	56.6	
Plaid Cymru	Jonathan Spencer Preston*	242	43.4	
Majority				
Conservative win (new seat)				

=== St Ishmael's ===
St Ishmael's 2022
Party	Candidate	Votes	%	±%
Independent	Reg Owens*	326	35.2	
Independent	Martin James Cheshire	256	27.7	
Independent	Claire Victoria George	227	24.5	
Green	Janie Harwood	116	12.5	
Majority				
Independent hold		Swing		

=== Saundersfoot South ===
Saundersfoot South 2022
Party	Candidate	Votes	%	±%
Independent	Chris Williams	432	64.0	
Independent	Mike Wainwright	159	23.6	
Conservative	James Bishop	84	12.4	
Majority				
Independent hold		Swing		

=== Solva ===
Solva 2022
Party	Candidate	Votes	%	±%
Conservative	Mark Metson Carter*	382	50.6	
Labour	Joshua David Phillips	373	49.4	
Majority				
Conservative hold		Swing		

=== Tenby North ===
Tenby North 2022
Party	Candidate	Votes	%	±%
Plaid Cymru	Michael Williams*	Unopposed	N/A	N/A
Plaid Cymru hold				

=== Tenby South ===
Tenby South 2022
Party	Candidate	Votes	%	±%
Independent	Sam Skyrme-Blackhall	427	58.0	
Plaid Cymru	Paul David Rapi*	309	42.0	
Majority				
Independent hold		Swing		

=== The Havens ===
The Havens 2022
Party	Candidate	Votes	%	±%
Independent	Peter John Morgan*	486	58.8	
Conservative	Nick Neumann	341	41.2	
Majority				
Independent win (new seat)				

=== Wiston ===
Wiston 2022
Party	Candidate	Votes	%	±%
Conservative	David Kenneth Howlett*	Unopposed		
Conservative win (new seat)				

== By-elections ==
=== St Ishamaels by-election 2024 ===
St Ishmaels by-election, 16 April 2024
Party	Candidate	Votes	%	±%
Conservative	Claire George	297	43.4	N/A
Independent	Richard Jenkins	242	35.3	N/A
Independent	Janie Harwood	69	10.1	−2.4
Independent	Bob Simister	52	7.6	N/A
Independent	Terry Worsley	25	3.6	N/A
Majority		55	8.0	
Conservative gain from Independent		Swing		

=== The Havens by-election 2024 ===
The Havens by-election, 10 October 2024
Party	Candidate	Votes	%	±%
Conservative	Nick Neumann	365	49.1	+7.9
Independent	Jony Griff	201	27.0	N/A
Liberal Democrats	Thomas James Hughes	135	18.1	N/A
Independent	Mike Harris	43	5.8	N/A
Majority		164		
Conservative gain from Independent		Swing		

=== Haverfordwest Prendergast by-election 2025 ===
Haverfordwest Prendergast by-election, 11 February 2025
Party	Candidate	Votes	%	±%
Independent	Alun Wills	199	31.6	N/A
Liberal Democrats	Kaleb Jenkins	160	25.4	N/A
Conservative	Michael Mathias	136	21.6	−37.0
Reform	Scott Thorley	71	11.3	N/A
Labour	Alison Tudor	57	9.0	−32.4
Green	James Purchase	8	1.1	N/A
Majority				
Independent gain from Conservative		Swing		

=== Fisghuard North East by-election 2026 ===
The by-election was caused by the death of Independent (previously Labour) councillor Jordan Paul Ryan in November 2025.

Fishguard North East by-election, 10 February 2026
Party	Candidate	Votes	%	±%
Plaid Cymru	William (Billy) Shaw	253	33.8	N/A
Liberal Democrats	Caleb Churchill	135	18.0	N/A
Reform	Peter John	95	12.8	N/A
Labour	Paul Howe	83	11.1	−47.9
Independent	Teresa Tannahill	79	10.5	N/A
Conservative	Brian Murphy	69	9.2	−31.9
Independent	Adrian Tyrrell	35	4.7	N/A
Majority		118	33.8	
Plaid Cymru gain from Labour		Swing		

=== Milford Hakin by-election 2026 ===
Milford Hakin by-election, 17 March 2026
Party	Candidate	Votes	%	±%
Reform	Scott Thorley	179	27.1	N/A
Conservative	Brian Taylor	144	21.8	▲0.5
Independent	Lee Bridges	106	16.0	N/A
Green	Sam Booth	85	12.9	N/A
Liberal Democrats	Sam Warden	57	8.6	N/A
Independent	Duncan Edwards	52	7.9	▼22.1
Labour	Nicola Harteveld	27	4.1	N/A
Independent	Derrick Abbott	11	1.7	N/A
Majority		35	5.3	▼13.4
Turnout		661	32.7	
Reform gain from Independent		Swing		

The by-election was caused by the death of Independent councillor Robert Michael Stoddart on 11 January 2026.

=== Pembroke Dock: Central by-election 2026 ===
Pembroke Dock: Central by-election: 8 December 2026
Party	Candidate	Votes	%	±%
Conservative	Claire Francis-Boswell			
Restore	Terence Jones			
Labour	Stephen O'Connor			
Reform	Ray Roberts			
Majority				
Turnout				
		Swing		
