= 2008 Pembrokeshire County Council election =

2008 Welsh local government election

Results of the 2008 Pembrokeshire County Council election

Elections to Pembrokeshire County Council were held on 1 May 2008. It was preceded by the 2004 election and followed by the 2012 election. On the same day there were elections to the other 21 local authorities in Wales, and to community council elections in Wales. There were also elections elsewhere in the United Kingdom

== Overview ==
All 60 council seats were up for election. The previous council was controlled by Independents as had been the case since the authority was formed in 1995. The Independents retained control in 2008 and Labour achieved its worst result of the four elections fought thus far.

Pembrokeshire County Council election result 2008
Party	Seats	Gains	Losses	Net gain/loss	Seats %	Votes %	Votes	+/−
Labour	5							
Conservative	5							
Liberal Democrats	3							
Plaid Cymru	5							
Independent	42							
Green	0							

== Results by ward ==
=== Amroth ===
Amroth 2008
Party	Candidate	Votes	%	±%
Liberal Democrats	John Anthony Brinsden*	354	66.2	−1.5
Conservative	Dilys Jenkinson	181	33.8	+33.8
Majority		173	32.4	
Liberal Democrats hold		Swing		

=== Burton ===
Burton 2008
Party	Candidate	Votes	%	±%
Independent	Roger David Wildman*	unopposed		
Independent hold		Swing		

=== Camrose ===
Camrose 2008
Party	Candidate	Votes	%	±%
Independent	James Llewellyn Adams*	unopposed		
Independent hold		Swing		

=== Carew ===
Carew 2008
Party	Candidate	Votes	%	±%
Independent	David James Neale*	301	54.5	
Conservative	Nigel Birt-Llewellin	136	24.6	
Independent	Norman Richard Parry	115	20.8	
Majority				
Independent hold		Swing		

=== Cilgerran ===
Cilgerran 2008
Party	Candidate	Votes	%	±%
Independent	John Thomas Davies*	unopposed		
Independent hold		Swing		

=== Clydau ===
-->

Clydau 2008
Party	Candidate	Votes	%	±%
Plaid Cymru	Roderick Gwilym Bowen*	unopposed		
Plaid Cymru hold		Swing		

=== Crymych ===
Crymych 2008
Party	Candidate	Votes	%	±%
Independent	John Lynn Davies*	unopposed		
Independent hold		Swing		

=== Dinas Cross ===
Dinas Cross 2008
Party	Candidate	Votes	%	±%
Liberal Democrats	Bob Kilmister	457	51.7	
Independent	John Morgan Griffiths*	325	36.8	
Plaid Cymru	Iwan Brioc	102	11.5	
Majority				
Liberal Democrats gain from Independent		Swing		

=== East Williamston ===
East Williamston 2008
Party	Candidate	Votes	%	±%
Independent	Ernest James Codd*	unopposed		
Independent hold		Swing		

=== Fishguard North East ===
Fishguard North East 2008
Party	Candidate	Votes	%	±%
Independent	Myles Christopher Geary Pepper	391	51.0	
Conservative	James Thickitt	189	24.6	
Independent	Henry Walter Jones*	187	24.4	
Majority				
Independent hold		Swing		

=== Fishguard North West ===
-->

Fishguard North West 2008
Party	Candidate	Votes	%	±%
Independent	Sian Elizabeth James*	362	62.2	
Independent	Richard Parry Davies	220	37.8	
Majority				
Independent hold		Swing		

=== Goodwick ===
-->

Goodwick 2008
Party	Candidate	Votes	%	±%
Plaid Cymru	Gwendoline Moira Lewis	285	41.7	
Independent	Mike Lloyd	232	34.0	
Labour	Gwilym Price	119	17.4	
Conservative	Stephen Probert	47	6.9	
Majority				
Plaid Cymru hold		Swing		

=== Haverfordwest Castle ===
Haverfordwest Castle 2008
Party	Candidate	Votes	%	±%
Labour	Thomas Baden Tudor*	438	56.4	
Conservative	Sarah Llewellyn	338	43.6	
Majority		100		
Labour hold		Swing		

=== Haverfordwest Garth ===
Haverfordwest Garth 2008
Party	Candidate	Votes	%	±%
Independent	Lyndon Frayling	282	57.7	
Conservative	Chris Harries	131	26.8	
Independent	Roy Thomas	76	15.5	
Majority				
Independent hold		Swing		

=== Haverfordwest Portfield ===
Haverfordwest Portfield 2008
Party	Candidate	Votes	%	±%
Independent	Peter Alan Stock*	unopposed		
Independent hold		Swing		

=== Haverfordwest Prendergast ===
Haverfordwest Prendergast 2008
Party	Candidate	Votes	%	±%
Independent	David Mark Edwards*	unopposed		
Independent hold		Swing		

=== Haverfordwest Priory ===
Haverfordwest Priory 2008
Party	Candidate	Votes	%	±%
Independent	David Michael Bryan*	650	75.8	
Independent	Steve Yelland	207	24.2	
Majority				
Independent hold		Swing		

=== Hundleton ===
Hundleton 2008
Party	Candidate	Votes	%	±%
Independent	John Seymour Allen-Mierhouse*	unopposed		
Independent hold		Swing		

=== Johnston ===
Ken Rowlands had been elected as a Labour candidate in 2004.

Johnston 2008
Party	Candidate	Votes	%	±%
Independent	Kenneth Rowlands*	480	72.8	
Conservative	Rachael Murray-King	179	27.2	
Majority				
Independent gain from Labour		Swing		

=== Kilgetty ===
Kilgetty 2008
Party	Candidate	Votes	%	±%
Independent	David John Pugh	483	58.5	
Independent	John Scott Murphy*	342	41.5	
Majority				
Independent hold		Swing		

=== Lampeter Velfrey ===
Lampeter Velfrey 2008
Party	Candidate	Votes	%	±%
Independent	David Simpson*	427	70.0	
Conservative	Jo Hammond	183	30.0	
Majority				
Independent hold		Swing		

=== Lamphey ===
Lamphey 2008
Party	Candidate	Votes	%	±%
Independent	Clive John Collins*	unopposed		
Independent hold		Swing		

=== Letterston ===
Letterston 2008
Party	Candidate	Votes	%	±%
Independent	Thomas James Richards*	344	39.2	
Independent	Leonard Thomas	292	33.3	
Conservative	Priscilla Williams	242	27.6	
Majority		52		
Independent hold		Swing		

=== Llangwm ===
Llangwm 2008
Party	Candidate	Votes	%	±%
Independent	Michael James John	305	31.9	
Independent	Pat Morris	289	30.3	
Independent	William Thomas	279	29.2	
Conservative	David Westrup	82	8.6	
Majority		16		
Independent hold		Swing		

=== Llanrhian ===
Llanrhian 2008
Party	Candidate	Votes	%	±%
Independent	David William Mansel Rees*	515	80.0	
Conservative	Janet Waymont	129	20.0	
Majority				
Independent hold		Swing		

=== Maenclochog ===
Maenclochog 2008
Party	Candidate	Votes	%	±%
Independent	Huw Meredydd George*	674	55.2	
Plaid Cymru	John Rhys Davies	282	23.1	
Conservative	Richard Griffiths	265	21.7	
Majority		333		
Independent hold		Swing		

=== Manorbier ===
Manorbier 2008
Party	Candidate	Votes	%	±%
Independent	Lewis Malcolm Calver*	353	36.0	
Labour	Anthony Leonard Wales	284	29.0	
Independent	Ray Hughes	192	19.6	
Independent	Ray Hine	99	10.1	
Plaid Cymru	Paul Diment	52	5.3	
Majority		69		
Independent hold		Swing		

=== Martletwy ===
Martletwy
Party	Candidate	Votes	%	±%
Independent	Robert Mark Lewis*	unopposed		
Independent hold		Swing		

=== Merlin’s Bridge ===
The winning candidate had stood for Labour in 2004.

Merlin's Bridge
Party	Candidate	Votes	%	±%
Independent	Mary Umelda Havard*	289	41.6	
Independent	Cyril George Maurice Hughes	203	29.3	
Independent	Stephen Brown	202	29.1	
Majority		86		
Independent gain from Labour		Swing		

=== Milford Central ===
Milford Central
Party	Candidate	Votes	%	±%
Independent	Anne Hughes*	309	47.5	
Liberal Democrats	Thomas Henry Sinclair	177	27.2	
Labour	Andrea Mills	164	25.2	
Majority				
Independent hold		Swing		

=== Milford East ===
-->

Milford East
Party	Candidate	Votes	%	±%
Independent	Danny Fellows	215	41.3	
Labour	Colin Robbins	125	24.0	
Independent	John Roberts	107	20.5	
Liberal Democrats	Tony Miles	74	14.2	
Majority		90		
Independent hold		Swing		

=== Milford Hakin ===
Milford Hakin
Party	Candidate	Votes	%	±%
Independent	Robert Michael Stoddart*	432	56.5	
Independent	Eric Ronald Harries	253	33.1	
Conservative	Fiona Birt-Llewellin	80	10.5	
Majority				
Independent hold		Swing		

=== Milford Hubberston ===
Milford Hubberston
Party	Candidate	Votes	%	±%
Independent	Vivien Stoddart	276	47.4	
Labour	Alun Emanuel Byrne*	178	30.6	
Conservative	John Lee	128	22.0	
Independent gain from Labour		Swing		

=== Milford North ===
Milford North 2008
Party	Candidate	Votes	%	±%
Conservative	Stanley Thomas Hudson	472	55.9	
Labour	John William Cole*	329	38.9	
Liberal Democrats	James Gent	44	5.2	
Majority				
Conservative gain from Labour		Swing		

=== Milford West ===
Milford West 2008
Party	Candidate	Votes	%	±%
Plaid Cymru	David Rhys Sinnett*	353	59.0	
Labour	Carolyne Stevens	160	26.8	
Conservative	Jenelle Murray-King	85	14.2	
Majority		190		
Plaid Cymru hold		Swing		

=== Narberth ===
Narberth 2008
Party	Candidate	Votes	%	±%
Independent	Wynne Edward Evans*	unopposed		
Independent hold		Swing		

=== Narberth Rural ===
Narberth Rural 2008
Party	Candidate	Votes	%	±%
Independent	Elwyn Morse	353	52.2	
Independent	Jayne Jones	238	35.2	
Conservative	Derek Williams	85	12.6	
Majority		105		
Independent hold		Swing		

=== Newport ===
Newport 2008
Party	Candidate	Votes	%	±%
Independent	Robin Evans	455	79.4	
Plaid Cymru	Vicky Moller	118	20.6	
Majority		337		
Independent hold		Swing		

=== Neyland East ===
Neyland East 2008
Party	Candidate	Votes	%	±%
Labour	Simon Leslie Hancock	705	82.6	
Conservative	Dorothy Morgan	149	17.4	
Labour hold		Swing		

=== Neyland West ===
Neyland West 2008
Party	Candidate	Votes	%	±%
Independent	Maureen Molyneaux	232	35.6	
Labour	Philip Walker	184	28.3	
Conservative	Michael Bryan	149	22.9	
Independent	Helen John	86	13.2	
Independent gain from Labour		Swing		

=== Pembroke Monkton ===
Pearl Llewellyn was elected as a Labour candidate in 2004.

Pembroke Monkton 2008
Party	Candidate	Votes	%	±%
Independent	Pearl Llewellyn*	341	68.2	
Labour	David Edwards	97	19.4	
Liberal Democrats	Keira Denise	32	6.4	
Independent	Keith John McNiffe	30	6.0	
Majority		212		
Independent gain from Labour		Swing		

=== Pembroke St Mary North ===
Pembroke St Mary North 2008
Party	Candidate	Votes	%	±%
Independent	William John Arwyn Williams*	230	37.2	
Labour	Tom Barrass	196	31.7	
Independent	Nikki Anderson	140	22.6	
Liberal Democrats	Stephanie Ashley	53	8.6	
Majority		34		
Independent hold		Swing		

=== Pembroke St Mary South ===
Pembroke St Mary South 2008
Party	Candidate	Votes	%	±%
Independent	Rosalie Vera Lilwal*	239	46.8	
Conservative	Darren Richards	118	23.1	
Labour	Jane Margueritta Major	100	19.6	
Liberal Democrats	Alison Jones	54	10.6	
Majority		121		
Independent hold		Swing		

=== Pembroke St Michael ===
The Conservative candidate had won the seat at a by-election in 2007 following the death of the previous member, John Allen.

Pembroke St Michael 2008
Party	Candidate	Votes	%	±%
Conservative	Aden Arthur Brinn*	527	51.9	
Liberal Democrats	Gareth Jones	384	37.8	
Plaid Cymru	Eirug Roberts	104	10.2	
Majority		143		
Conservative hold		Swing		

=== Pembroke Dock Central ===
Pembroke Dock Central 2008
Party	Candidate	Votes	%	±%
Labour	Linda Becton*	274	62.8	
Conservative	Maureen Colgon	162	37.2	
Majority		112		
Labour hold		Swing		

=== Pembroke Dock Llanion ===
Pembroke Dock Llanion 2008
Party	Candidate	Votes	%	±%
Labour	Susan Perkins*	416	48.2	
Conservative	Darren Esmond	236	27.3	
Independent	Steven Lade	211	24.2	
Majority		180		
Labour hold		Swing		

=== Pembroke Dock Market ===
Pembroke Dock Market 2008
Party	Candidate	Votes	%	±%
Independent	Brian John Hall*	274	44.8	
Labour	Christine Gwyther	235	38.4	
Independent	Steve Bale	103	16.8	
Majority		39		
Independent hold		Swing		

=== Pembroke Dock Pennar ===
Pembroke Dock Pennar 2008
Party	Candidate	Votes	%	±%
Labour	Anthony Wilcox*	669	61.7	
Independent	Martin Cavaney	327	30.1	
Independent	Sue Bale	89	8.2	
Majority				
Labour hold		Swing		

=== Penally ===
Penally 2008
Party	Candidate	Votes	%	±%
Plaid Cymru	Carol Cavill*	410	66.1	
Conservative	Di Clements	210	33.9	
Majority		200		
Plaid Cymru hold		Swing		

=== Rudbaxton ===
Rudbaxton 2008
Party	Candidate	Votes	%	±%
Conservative	Richard Hancock	417	51.4	
Independent	David Islwyn Howells*	395	48.6	
Majority		22		
Conservative gain from Independent		Swing		

=== St David's ===
St David's 2008
Party	Candidate	Votes	%	±%
Independent	David George*	399	45.8	
Independent	David Gareth Beechey Lloyd	229	26.3	
Conservative	Debra Murphy	147	16.9	
Labour	Alan York	96	11.0	
Majority		170		
Independent hold		Swing		

=== St Dogmaels ===
St Dogmaels 2008
Party	Candidate	Votes	%	±%
Liberal Democrats	Liz Campion	677	61.7	
Independent	David Griffith Michael James	421	38.3	
Majority		256		
Liberal Democrats gain from Independent		Swing		

=== St Ishmael's ===
St Ishmael's 2008
Party	Candidate	Votes	%	±%
Independent	Martin Davies	336	57.6	
Independent	William Joseph Roberts*	247	42.4	
Majority		89		
Independent hold		Swing		

=== Saundersfoot ===
Rosemary Hayes was one of the longest serving members of the Council, having represented Saundersfoot on the authority since 1995 and previously been the district councillor on the former South Pembrokeshire District Council for many years. Phil Baker had stood as a Liberal Democrat in 2004.

Saundersfoot 2008
Party	Candidate	Votes	%	±%
Independent	Philip Raymond Baker	549	57.6	
Independent	Rosemary Rebecca Hayes*	404	42.4	
Majority		145		
Independent hold		Swing		

=== Scleddau ===
Alwyn Luke was one of the longest serving members of the Council, having represented Scleddau on the authority since 1995 and previously been the district councillor on the former Preseli Pembrokeshire District Council for many years. David Williams had stood as a Liberal Democrat in 2008.

Scleddau 2008
Party	Candidate	Votes	%	±%
Conservative	Owen Watkin James	219	35.2	
Independent	Alwyn Cadwallader Luke*	167	26.8	
Independent	Jeff Evans	125	20.1	
Independent	David Williams	87	14.0	
Independent	Chris Haden	24	3.9	
Majority		52		
Independent hold		Swing		

=== Solva ===
Solva 2008
Party	Candidate	Votes	%	±%
Independent	William Leslie Raymond*	465	76.1	
Labour	Mollie Roach	146	23.9	
Majority		319		
Independent hold		Swing		

=== Tenby North ===
Tenby North 2008
Party	Candidate	Votes	%	±%
Plaid Cymru	Michael Williams*	606	75.3	
Independent	Sue Lane	104	12.9	
Conservative	Jill King	95	11.8	
Majority		502		
Plaid Cymru hold		Swing		

=== Tenby South ===
Tenby South 2008
Party	Candidate	Votes	%	±%
Independent	Michael Evans	unopposed		
Independent hold		Swing		

=== The Havens ===
The Havens 2008
Party	Candidate	Votes	%	±%
Independent	Peter Morgan	262	34.6	
Independent	Gordon Main	234	30.9	
Conservative	Frank Elliott	130	17.2	
Independent	Herbie Scurlock	98	12.9	
Liberal Democrats	David Gardner	34	4.5	
Majority		28		
Independent hold		Swing		

=== Wiston ===
Wiston 2008
Party	Candidate	Votes	%	±%
Conservative	David Howlett	411	52.8	
Independent	Bobbie Sheldrake	368	47.2	
Majority				
Conservative gain from Independent		Swing		
