= 2012 Pembrokeshire County Council election =

2012 Welsh local government election

The fifth election to Pembrokeshire County Council was held on 3 May 2012. It was preceded by the 2008 election and followed by the 2017 election. On the same day there were elections to 20 of the other 21 local authorities in Wales (all except Anglesey), community council elections in Wales and other elections elsewhere in the United Kingdom

Results of the 2012 Pembrokeshire County Council election

All 60 council seats were up for election. The previous council was controlled by Independents as had been the case since the authority was formed in 1995. The Independents retained control in 2012.

Councillors elected in this election were to serve an extended five-year term, after the Welsh Government announced the next elections would be moved from 2016 to 2017 to avoid clashing with the next Welsh Assembly election in 2016 (which in turn had been delayed a year to avoid clashing with the next general election).

Although Independent councillors won a majority, there were divisions amongst them and an Independent Plus group has emerged with a small majority. The majority became precarious following the resignation of former Plaid Cymru councillor Stephen Joseph from the group in August 2014.

== Overview ==
Pembrokeshire County Council election result 2012
| Party | Seats | Gains | Losses | Net gain/loss | Seats % | Votes % | Votes | +/− |
|---|---|---|---|---|---|---|---|---|
| Independent | 42 | 4 | 4 | 0 | 70.0 | 63.7 | 20,968 | +8.6 |
| Conservative | 3 | 0 | 2 | -2 | 5.0 | 16.1 | 5,316 | -1.1 |
| Labour | 9 | 4 | 0 | +4 | 15.0 | 11.5 | 3,780 | -2.8 |
| Plaid Cymru | 5 | 1 | 1 | 0 | 8.3 | 8.0 | 2,621 | +1.3 |
| Liberal Democrats | 1 | 0 | 2 | -2 | 1.7 | 0.7 | 238 | -6.1 |

== Results by ward ==
=== Amroth ===
Tony Brinsden had been elected as a Liberal Democrat in 2004 and 2008 but subsequently joined the Independents.

Amroth 2012
| Party | Candidate | Votes | % | ±% |
|---|---|---|---|---|
| Independent | John Anthony Brinsden* | 313 | 65.2 | −1.0 |
| Conservative | Dilys Jenkinson | 167 | 34.8 | +1.0 |
| Majority | | 146 | 30.4 | |
| Independent hold | | Swing | | |

=== Burton ===
Burton 2012
| Party | Candidate | Votes | % | ±% |
|---|---|---|---|---|
| Independent | Roger David Wildman* | unopposed | | |
| Independent hold | | Swing | | |

=== Camrose ===
Camrose 2012
| Party | Candidate | Votes | % | ±% |
|---|---|---|---|---|
| Independent | James Llewellyn Adams* | unopposed | | |
| Independent hold | | Swing | | |

=== Carew ===
Carew 2012
| Party | Candidate | Votes | % | ±% |
|---|---|---|---|---|
| Independent | David James Neale* | unopposed | | |
| Independent hold | | Swing | | |

=== Cilgerran ===
Cilgerran 2012
| Party | Candidate | Votes | % | ±% |
|---|---|---|---|---|
| Independent | John Thomas Davies* | 751 | 93.6 | |
| Plaid Cymru | Kett Seymour | 51 | 6.4 | |
| Majority | | 700 | 87.2 | |
| Independent hold | | Swing | | |

=== Clydau ===
-->

Clydau 2012
| Party | Candidate | Votes | % | ±% |
|---|---|---|---|---|
| Plaid Cymru | Roderick Gwilym Bowen* | Unopposed | | |
| Plaid Cymru hold | | Swing | | |

=== Crymych ===
Crymych 2012
| Party | Candidate | Votes | % | ±% |
|---|---|---|---|---|
| Independent | John Keith Lewis | 707 | 59.2 | |
| Plaid Cymru | Cristoffer Wyn Tomos | 488 | 40.8 | |
| Majority | | 219 | 18.4 | |
| Independent hold | | Swing | | |

=== Dinas Cross ===
Dinas Cross 2012
| Party | Candidate | Votes | % | ±% |
|---|---|---|---|---|
| Liberal Democrats | Bob Kilmister* | unopposed | | |
| Liberal Democrats hold | | Swing | | |

=== East Williamston ===
East Williamston 2012
| Party | Candidate | Votes | % | ±% |
|---|---|---|---|---|
| Independent | Jacob John Williams | 602 | 65.1 | |
| Independent | Ernest James Codd* | 282 | 30.5 | |
| Conservative | Nigel Birt-Llewellin | 41 | 4.4 | |
| Majority | | 320 | 34.6 | |
| Independent hold | | Swing | | |

=== Fishguard North East ===
Fishguard North East 2012
| Party | Candidate | Votes | % | ±% |
|---|---|---|---|---|
| Independent | Myles Christopher Geary Pepper* | 609 | 77.6 | |
| Conservative | Richard Parry Davies | 176 | 22.4 | |
| Majority | | 433 | 55.2 | |
| Independent hold | | Swing | | |

=== Fishguard North West ===
-->

Fishguard North West 2012
| Party | Candidate | Votes | % | ±% |
|---|---|---|---|---|
| Labour | Pat Davies | 293 | 53.0 | |
| Conservative | Henry Walter Jones | 101 | 18.3 | |
| Liberal Democrats | Dai Williams | 82 | 14.8 | |
| Independent | Jackie Maddocks | 49 | 8.9 | |
| Plaid Cymru | Rhys Hughes | 28 | 5 | |
| Majority | | 192 | 34.7 | |
| Labour gain from Independent | | Swing | | |

=== Goodwick ===
Goodwick 2012
| Party | Candidate | Votes | % | ±% |
|---|---|---|---|---|
| Labour | Gwilym Patrick Price | 238 | 35.3 | |
| Plaid Cymru | Gwendoline Moira Lewis* | 169 | 25.1 | |
| Conservative | James Jonathon Thickitt | 148 | 22 | |
| Liberal Democrats | Richard John Grosvenor | 119 | 17.6 | |
| Majority | | 69 | 10.2 | |
| Labour gain from Plaid Cymru | | Swing | | |

=== Haverfordwest Castle ===
Haverfordwest Castle 2012
| Party | Candidate | Votes | % | ±% |
|---|---|---|---|---|
| Labour | Thomas Baden Tudor* | 557 | 67.9 | |
| Conservative | Sarah Marie Llewellyn | 263 | 32.1 | |
| Majority | | 294 | 35.8 | |
| Labour hold | | Swing | | |

=== Haverfordwest Garth ===
Haverfordwest Garth 2012
| Party | Candidate | Votes | % | ±% |
|---|---|---|---|---|
| Independent | Lyndon Leslie Frayling* | 237 | 35.6 | |
| Labour | Wally Watson | 172 | 25.9 | |
| Independent | Peter John Iles | 144 | 21.7 | |
| Conservative | John David Vaughan | 112 | 16.8 | |
| Majority | | 65 | 9.7 | |
| Independent hold | | Swing | | |

=== Haverfordwest Portfield ===
Haverfordwest Portfield 2012
| Party | Candidate | Votes | % | ±% |
|---|---|---|---|---|
| Independent | Peter Alan Stock* | 685 | 74.7 | |
| Conservative | Christine Whelton | 232 | 25.3 | |
| Majority | | 453 | 49.4 | |
| Independent hold | | Swing | | |

=== Haverfordwest Prendergast ===
Haverfordwest Prendergast 2012
| Party | Candidate | Votes | % | ±% |
|---|---|---|---|---|
| Independent | David Mark Edwards* | unopposed | | |
| Independent hold | | Swing | | |

=== Haverfordwest Priory ===
Haverfordwest Priory 2012
| Party | Candidate | Votes | % | ±% |
|---|---|---|---|---|
| Independent | David Michael Bryan* | 684 | 86.9 | |
| Independent | Byron Henry Frayling | 103 | 13.1 | |
| Majority | | 581 | 73.8 | |
| Independent hold | | Swing | | |

=== Hundleton ===
Hundleton 2012
| Party | Candidate | Votes | % | ±% |
|---|---|---|---|---|
| Independent | John Seymour Allen-Mierhouse* | 337 | 44.7 | |
| Independent | Margot Magdalena Hanna Mechthild Bateman | 297 | 39.4 | |
| Labour | David William Edwards | 120 | 15.9 | |
| Majority | | 40 | 5.3 | |
| Independent hold | | Swing | | |

=== Johnston ===
Johnston 2012
| Party | Candidate | Votes | % | ±% |
|---|---|---|---|---|
| Independent | Kenneth Rowlands* | 542 | 76 | |
| Independent | Angela Beatrice Newman | 171 | 24 | |
| Majority | | 371 | 52 | |
| Independent gain from Labour | | Swing | | |

=== Kilgetty / Begelly ===
Kilgetty / Begelly 2012
| Party | Candidate | Votes | % | ±% |
|---|---|---|---|---|
| Independent | David John Pugh* | unopposed | | |
| Independent hold | | Swing | | |

=== Lampeter Velfrey ===
Lampeter Velfrey 2012
| Party | Candidate | Votes | % | ±% |
|---|---|---|---|---|
| Independent | David Simpson* | 362 | 66.2 | |
| Conservative | Jo Hammond | 185 | 33.8 | |
| Majority | | 177 | 32.4 | |
| Independent hold | | Swing | | |

=== Lamphey ===
Lamphey 2012
| Party | Candidate | Votes | % | ±% |
|---|---|---|---|---|
| Independent | Tessa Hodgson | 292 | 43.2 | |
| Independent | Clive John Collins* | 163 | 24.1 | |
| Conservative | Jon Harvey | 136 | 20.1 | |
| Labour | Beth Power | 85 | 12.6 | |
| Majority | | 129 | 19.1 | |
| Independent hold | | Swing | | |

=== Letterston ===
Letterston 2012
| Party | Candidate | Votes | % | ±% |
|---|---|---|---|---|
| Independent | Thomas James Richards* | 381 | 52.9 | |
| Conservative | Tasha Danielle Sexton | 339 | 47.1 | |
| Majority | | 42 | 5.8 | |
| Independent hold | | Swing | | |

=== Llangwm ===
Llangwm 2012
| Party | Candidate | Votes | % | ±% |
|---|---|---|---|---|
| Independent | Michael James John* | 537 | 58.8 | |
| Independent | Damiana Morgans | 377 | 41.2 | |
| Majority | | 160 | 17.6 | |
| Independent hold | | Swing | | |

=== Llanrhian ===
Llanrhian 2012
| Party | Candidate | Votes | % | ±% |
|---|---|---|---|---|
| Independent | David William Mansel Rees* | unopposed | | |
| Independent hold | | Swing | | |

=== Maenclochog ===
Maenclochog 2012
| Party | Candidate | Votes | % | ±% |
|---|---|---|---|---|
| Independent | Huw Meredydd George* | 672 | 60.4 | |
| Plaid Cymru | John Rhys Davies | 440 | 39.6 | |
| Majority | | 232 | 20.8 | |
| Independent hold | | Swing | | |

=== Manorbier ===
Manorbier 2012
| Party | Candidate | Votes | % | ±% |
|---|---|---|---|---|
| Independent | Philip Kidney | 319 | 31.7 | |
| Independent | Lewis Malcolm Calver* | 267 | 26.6 | |
| Independent | Ray Hughes | 145 | 14.4 | |
| Labour | Anthony Leonard Wales | 132 | 13.1 | |
| Conservative | Eleanor Parker | 70 | 7 | |
| Independent | Norman Richard Parry | 65 | 6.5 | |
| Independent | Pearl Tew | 7 | 0.7 | |
| Majority | | 52 | 5.1 | |
| Independent hold | | Swing | | |

=== Martletwy ===
Martletwy 2012
| Party | Candidate | Votes | % | ±% |
|---|---|---|---|---|
| Independent | Robert Mark Lewis* | 533 | 68.8 | |
| Conservative | Jules Thomas | 242 | 31.2 | |
| Majority | | 291 | 37.6 | |
| Independent hold | | Swing | | |

=== Merlin’s Bridge ===
The winning candidate had stood for Labour in 2004 but as an Independent in 2008.

Merlin's Bridge 2012
| Party | Candidate | Votes | % | ±% |
|---|---|---|---|---|
| Independent | Mary Umelda Havard* | 225 | 38.9 | |
| Labour | Stephen Brown | 193 | 33.3 | |
| Independent | Paul Edmond Davies | 161 | 27.8 | |
| Majority | | 32 | 5.6 | |
| Independent hold | | Swing | | |

=== Milford Central ===
Stephen Joseph defeated long-serving Independent, Anne Hughes, a member since 1999. However he later left for the Independent Plus group, and left that group in August 2014.

Milford Central 2012
| Party | Candidate | Votes | % | ±% |
|---|---|---|---|---|
| Plaid Cymru | Stephen Glanville Joseph | 421 | 60.8 | |
| Independent | Anne Hughes* | 224 | 32.3 | |
| Independent | Tony Miles | 48 | 6.9 | |
| Majority | | 197 | 28.5 | |
| Plaid Cymru gain from Independent | | Swing | | |

=== Milford East ===
-->

Milford East 2012
| Party | Candidate | Votes | % | ±% |
|---|---|---|---|---|
| Labour | Guy Woodham | 353 | 61.9 | |
| Conservative | Dan Mills | 217 | 38.1 | |
| Majority | | 136 | 23.8 | |
| Labour gain from Independent | | Swing | | |

=== Milford Hakin ===
Milford Hakin 2012
| Party | Candidate | Votes | % | ±% |
|---|---|---|---|---|
| Independent | Robert Michael Stoddart* | 478 | 77.9 | |
| Conservative | Rhys Williams | 136 | 22.1 | |
| Majority | | 342 | 55.8 | |
| Independent hold | | Swing | | |

=== Milford Hubberston ===
Milford Hubberston 2012
| Party | Candidate | Votes | % | ±% |
|---|---|---|---|---|
| Independent | Vivien Stoddart* | 292 | 51.7 | |
| Labour | Alun Emanuel Byrne | 273 | 48.3 | |
| Majority | | 19 | 3.4 | |
| Independent hold | | Swing | | |

=== Milford North ===
Milford North 2012
| Party | Candidate | Votes | % | ±% |
|---|---|---|---|---|
| Conservative | Stanley Thomas Hudson* | 439 | 51.5 | |
| Labour | John William Cole | 414 | 48.5 | |
| Majority | | 25 | 3.0 | |
| Conservative hold | | Swing | | |

=== Milford West ===
Milford West 2012
| Party | Candidate | Votes | % | ±% |
|---|---|---|---|---|
| Plaid Cymru | David Rhys Sinnett* | unopposed | | |
| Plaid Cymru hold | | Swing | | |

=== Narberth ===
Narberth 2012
| Party | Candidate | Votes | % | ±% |
|---|---|---|---|---|
| Independent | Wynne Edward Evans* | 403 | 50.3 | |
| Independent | Sue Rees | 215 | 26.8 | |
| Conservative | Di Clements | 183 | 22.8 | |
| Majority | | 188 | 23.5 | |
| Independent hold | | Swing | | |

=== Narberth Rural ===
Narberth Rural 2012
| Party | Candidate | Votes | % | ±% |
|---|---|---|---|---|
| Independent | Elwyn Albert Morse | 472 | 84.4 | |
| Conservative | Rayner Peett | 87 | 15.6 | |
| Majority | | 385 | 68.8 | |
| Independent hold | | Swing | | |

=== Newport ===
Newport 2012
| Party | Candidate | Votes | % | ±% |
|---|---|---|---|---|
| Independent | Norman Paul Harries | 228 | 41.4 | |
| Independent | Tina Shevlin | 160 | 29 | |
| Plaid Cymru | Vicky Moller | 77 | 14 | |
| Independent | James Llewellyn Davies | 49 | 8.9 | |
| Liberal Democrats | Nikki Kilmister | 37 | 6.7 | |
| Majority | | 68 | 12.4 | |
| Independent hold | | Swing | | |

=== Neyland East ===
Having been a Labour councillor since 1995, Simon Hancock did not explicitly stand as a Labour candidate and immediately after the election joined the Independent group.

Neyland East 2012
| Party | Candidate | Votes | % | ±% |
|---|---|---|---|---|
| Independent | Simon Leslie Hancock* | unopposed | | |
| Independent gain from Labour | | Swing | | |

=== Neyland West ===
Neyland West 2012
| Party | Candidate | Votes | % | ±% |
|---|---|---|---|---|
| Labour | Paul Nigel Miller | 345 | 50.7 | |
| Independent | Dorothy Cox | 188 | 27.6 | |
| Independent | Maureen Molyneaux* | 148 | 21.7 | |
| Majority | | 157 | 23.1 | |
| Labour gain from Independent | | Swing | | |

=== Pembroke Monkton ===
Peral Llewellyn had originally been elected as a Labour candidate in 2004.

Pembroke Monkton 2012
| Party | Candidate | Votes | % | ±% |
|---|---|---|---|---|
| Independent | Peral Llewellyn* | 347 | 69.4 | |
| Independent | William Skyrme Rees | 153 | 30.6 | |
| Majority | | 194 | 38.8 | |
| Independent hold | | Swing | | |

=== Pembroke St Mary North ===
Pembroke St Mary North 2012
| Party | Candidate | Votes | % | ±% |
|---|---|---|---|---|
| Independent | William John Arwyn Williams* | 304 | 69.1 | |
| Conservative | Ceri-Ann Bowles | 136 | 30.9 | |
| Majority | | 168 | 38.2 | |
| Independent hold | | Swing | | |

=== Pembroke St Mary South ===
Pembroke St Mary South 2012
| Party | Candidate | Votes | % | ±% |
|---|---|---|---|---|
| Independent | Daphne Margaret Jane Bush | 172 | 36.4 | |
| Independent | Melanie Anne Phillips | 164 | 34.7 | |
| Conservative | Aaron Leigh Carey | 136 | 28.8 | |
| Majority | | 8 | 1.7 | |
| Independent hold | | Swing | | |

=== Pembroke St Michael ===
Pembroke St Michael 2012
| Party | Candidate | Votes | % | ±% |
|---|---|---|---|---|
| Independent | Jonathan Anthony Robert Nutting | 489 | | |
| Conservative | Aden Arthur Brinn* | 432 | | |
| Majority | | 57 | | |
| Independent gain from Conservative | | Swing | | |

=== Pembroke Dock Central ===
Pembroke Dock Central 2012
| Party | Candidate | Votes | % | ±% |
|---|---|---|---|---|
| Labour | Alison Lee | 190 | | |
| Independent | Martin Cavaney | 111 | | |
| Independent | Kate Becton | 66 | | |
| Conservative | Chris Harries | 62 | | |
| Majority | | 79 | | |
| Labour hold | | Swing | | |

=== Pembroke Dock Llanion ===
Pembroke Dock Llanion 2012
| Party | Candidate | Votes | % | ±% |
|---|---|---|---|---|
| Labour | Susan Perkins* | 395 | | |
| Independent | Peter Frederick Stanley Kraus | 338 | | |
| Majority | | 57 | | |
| Labour hold | | Swing | | |

=== Pembroke Dock Market ===
Pembroke Dock Market 2012
| Party | Candidate | Votes | % | ±% |
|---|---|---|---|---|
| Independent | Brian John Hall* | 361 | | |
| Labour | Andrew James McNaughton | 235 | | |
| Majority | | 196 | | |
| Independent hold | | Swing | | |

=== Pembroke Dock Pennar ===
Pembroke Dock Pennar 2012
| Party | Candidate | Votes | % | ±% |
|---|---|---|---|---|
| Labour | Anthony Wilcox* | unopposed | | |
| Labour hold | | Swing | | |

=== Penally ===
Penally 2012
| Party | Candidate | Votes | % | ±% |
|---|---|---|---|---|
| Plaid Cymru | Jonathan Spencer Preston | 276 | | |
| Conservative | Jon Everrett | 255 | | |
| Independent | Graham Fry | 45 | | |
| Majority | | 21 | | |
| Plaid Cymru hold | | Swing | | |

=== Rudbaxton ===
Rudbaxton 2012
| Party | Candidate | Votes | % | ±% |
|---|---|---|---|---|
| Independent | Steve Yelland | 212 | | |
| Conservative | Richard Nicholas Hancock* | 154 | | |
| Majority | | 58 | | |
| Independent gain from Conservative | | Swing | | |

=== St David's ===
St David's 2012
| Party | Candidate | Votes | % | ±% |
|---|---|---|---|---|
| Independent | David Gareth Beechey Lloyd | 415 | | |
| Independent | John George | 205 | | |
| Conservative | Debra Murphy | 126 | | |
| Labour | Alan Charles York | 117 | | |
| Majority | | 210 | | |
| Independent hold | | Swing | | |

=== St Dogmaels ===
St Dogmaels 2012
| Party | Candidate | Votes | % | ±% |
|---|---|---|---|---|
| Independent | David Griffith Michael James | 746 | | |
| Plaid Cymru | Adam Herriott | 63 | | |
| Majority | | | | |
| Independent gain from Liberal Democrats | | Swing | | |

=== St Ishmael's ===
St Ishmael's 2012
| Party | Candidate | Votes | % | ±% |
|---|---|---|---|---|
| Independent | Reg Owens | 270 | | |
| Conservative | Adam Gent | 184 | | |
| Independent | Moira Hawkins | 160 | | |
| Majority | | | | |
| Independent hold | | Swing | | |

=== Saundersfoot ===
Saundersfoot 2012
| Party | Candidate | Votes | % | ±% |
|---|---|---|---|---|
| Independent | Philip Raymond Baker* | 562 | | |
| Conservative | Rosemary Rebecca Hayes | 333 | | |
| Majority | | | | |
| Independent hold | | Swing | | |

=== Scleddau ===
Scleddau 2012
| Party | Candidate | Votes | % | ±% |
|---|---|---|---|---|
| Conservative | Owen Watkin James* | 255 | | |
| Independent | Raymond Llewhelin | 200 | | |
| Plaid Cymru | Bethan Hughes | 90 | | |
| Majority | | 55 | | |
| Conservative hold | | Swing | | |

=== Solva ===
Solva 2012
| Party | Candidate | Votes | % | ±% |
|---|---|---|---|---|
| Independent | Lyn Margaret Jenkins | 189 | | |
| Independent | David Phillips | 179 | | |
| Labour | Mollie Roach | 152 | | |
| Independent | Stephen John Bale | 49 | | |
| Majority | | 10 | | |
| Independent hold | | Swing | | |

=== Tenby North ===
Tenby North 2012
| Party | Candidate | Votes | % | ±% |
|---|---|---|---|---|
| Plaid Cymru | Michael Williams* | 518 | | |
| Conservative | Fiona Birt-Llewellyn | 152 | | |
| Majority | | | | |
| Plaid Cymru hold | | Swing | | |

=== Tenby South ===
Tenby South 2012
| Party | Candidate | Votes | % | ±% |
|---|---|---|---|---|
| Independent | Michael Evans | 511 | | |
| Independent | Jennifer Mary Bradley | 199 | | |
| Independent hold | | Swing | | |

=== The Havens ===
The Havens 2012
| Party | Candidate | Votes | % | ±% |
|---|---|---|---|---|
| Independent | Peter John Morgan* | unopposed | | |
| Independent hold | | Swing | | |

=== Wiston ===
Wiston 2012
| Party | Candidate | Votes | % | ±% |
|---|---|---|---|---|
| Conservative | David Kenneth Howlett | unopposed | | |
| Conservative hold | | Swing | | |

== By-Elections 2012-2017 ==
=== Burton by-election 2013 ===
A by-election was held in the Burton Ward on 11 April 2013 following the retirement of David Wildman. The successful candidate stood as an 'Independent Plus' candidate, supporting the ruling group on the authority.

-->

Burton by-election 2013
| Party | Candidate | Votes | % | ±% |
|---|---|---|---|---|
| Independent | Robert George Summons | 291 | | |
| Conservative | Robin Wilson | 166 | | |
| Labour | Robin Howells | 162 | | |
| Independent | Jon Harvey | 46 | | |
| Majority | | | | |
| Independent hold | | Swing | | |
