= Milford Hakin =

Coordinates: 51.712°N 5.047°W

- Electoral ward
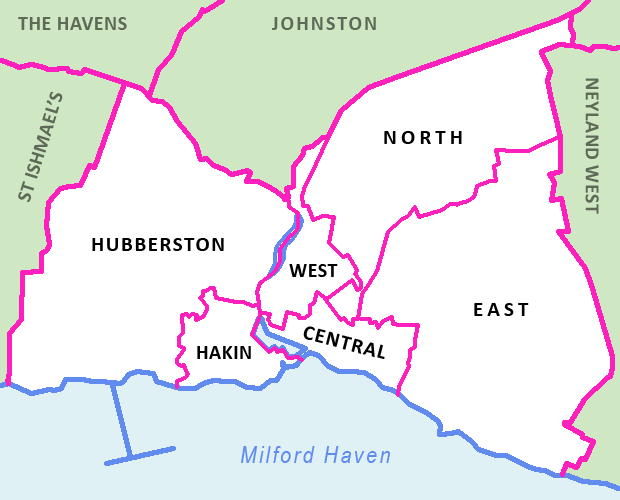
- Ward locations within the town of Milford Haven

- Location within Pembrokeshire
- Population: 2,239 (2011 census)
- Principal area: Pembrokeshire
- Country: Wales
- Sovereign state: United Kingdom
- Post town: MILFORD HAVEN
- Postcode district: SA73
- Dialling code: +44-1646
- UK Parliament: Preseli Pembrokeshire
- Senedd Cymru – Welsh Parliament: Preseli Pembrokeshire
- Councillors: 1 (County); 3 (Town Council)

Milford Hakin is an electoral ward in Pembrokeshire, Wales. It covers the Hakin area of the Milford Haven community, to the west of Milford Haven Docks. It elects a councillor to Pembrokeshire County Council and three councillors to Milford Haven Town Council.

According to the 2011 UK Census the population of the ward was 2,239 (with 1,817 of voting age).

Prior to 1996 the ward for elections to Dyfed County Council was simply called Hakin.

== County elections ==
At the May 2012 and May 2017 election the sitting Independent councillor Mike Stoddart successfully defended his seat. His wife Viv Stoddart won the neighbouring Milford Hubberston seat.

2017 Pembrokeshire County Council election
Party	Candidate	Votes	%	±%
Independent	Mike Stoddart *	336		
Labour	Jon Thrower	225		
Independent	David Warrell	78		
Independent	William Elliott	61		
Independent	Rhys Williams	31		

2012 Pembrokeshire County Council election
Party	Candidate	Votes	%	±%
Independent	Mike Stoddart *	478		
Conservative	Rhys Williams	136		

2008 Pembrokeshire County Council election
Party	Candidate	Votes	%	±%
Independent	Robert Michael Stoddart *	432	56.5	
Independent	Eric Ronald Harries	253	33.1	
Conservative	Fiona Birt-Llewellin	80	10.5	
Majority				

* = sitting councillor prior to the election

== See also ==
- Milford Central
- Milford West
- List of electoral wards in Pembrokeshire
