= 2017 Pembrokeshire County Council election =

2017 Welsh local government election

The 2017 election to Pembrokeshire County Council was held on 4 May 2017 as part of wider local elections across Wales. The election was preceded by the 2012 election. It was followed by the 2022 election. Twelve seats (out of the sixty available) had candidates elected unopposed.

Results of the 2017 Pembrokeshire County Council election

== Ward results ==
Nominations closed on 4 April 2017.

=== Amroth ===
Amroth 2017
| Party | Candidate | Votes | % | ±% |
|---|---|---|---|---|
| Conservative | Tony Barron | 225 | 50.2 | |
| Liberal Democrats | Mary Kathleen Megarry | 223 | 49.8 | |
| Majority | | 2 | 0.4 | |
| Conservative gain from Independent | | Swing | | |

=== Burton ===
Rob Summons was elected as an Independent at a by-election in 2013.

Burton 2017
| Party | Candidate | Votes | % | ±% |
|---|---|---|---|---|
| Conservative | Robert George Summons* | Unopposed | | |
| Conservative gain from Independent | | | | |

=== Camrose ===
Camrose 2017
| Party | Candidate | Votes | % | ±% |
|---|---|---|---|---|
| Independent | James Llewellyn Adams* | 448 | 36.8 | |
| Independent | Nicky Watts | 358 | 29.4 | |
| Conservative | Jonathan David Twigg | 275 | 22.6 | |
| Plaid Cymru | Kay Dearing | 135 | 11.1 | |
| Majority | | 90 | | |
| Independent hold | | Swing | | |

=== Carew ===
Carew 2017
| Party | Candidate | Votes | % | ±% |
|---|---|---|---|---|
| Plaid Cymru | Paul David Rapi | 310 | 52.3 | |
| Independent | David James Neale* | 224 | 37.8 | |
| Independent | Norman Richard Parry | 59 | 9.9 | |
| Majority | | 86 | | |
| Plaid Cymru gain from Independent | | Swing | | |

=== Cilgerran ===
Cilgerran 2017
| Party | Candidate | Votes | % | ±% |
|---|---|---|---|---|
| Independent | John Thomas Davies* | Unopposed | | |
| Independent hold | | | | |

=== Clydau ===
Clydau 2017
| Party | Candidate | Votes | % | ±% |
|---|---|---|---|---|
| Plaid Cymru | Roderick Gwilym Bowen* | Unopposed | | |
| Plaid Cymru hold | | | | |

=== Crymych ===
Crymych 2017
| Party | Candidate | Votes | % | ±% |
|---|---|---|---|---|
| Plaid Cymru | Cristoffer Wyn Tomos | 616 | 54.4 | |
| Independent | John Keith Lewis* | 516 | 45.6 | |
| Majority | | 100 | | |
| Plaid Cymru gain from Independent | | Swing | | |

=== Dinas Cross ===
Dinas Cross 2017
| Party | Candidate | Votes | % | ±% |
|---|---|---|---|---|
| Liberal Democrats | Bob Kilmister* | 550 | 78.1 | |
| Plaid Cymru | Myles Anthony Bamford-Lewis | 154 | 21.9 | |
| Majority | | 396 | | |
| Liberal Democrats hold | | Swing | | |

=== East Williamston ===
East Williamston 2017
| Party | Candidate | Votes | % | ±% |
|---|---|---|---|---|
| Independent | Jacob John Williams* | 730 | 75.1 | |
| Independent | Mackie Harts | 242 | 24.9 | |
| Majority | | 488 | | |
| Independent hold | | Swing | | |

=== Fishguard North East ===
Fishguard North East 2017
| Party | Candidate | Votes | % | ±% |
|---|---|---|---|---|
| Independent | Myles Christopher Geary Pepper* | 449 | 61.1 | |
| Labour | Alexander Frederick Allison | 286 | 38.9 | |
| Majority | | 163 | | |
| Independent hold | | Swing | | |

=== Fishguard North West ===
Pat Davies was elected as a Labour candidate in 2012

Fishguard North West 2017
| Party | Candidate | Votes | % | ±% |
|---|---|---|---|---|
| Independent | Pat Davies* | 371 | 67.3 | |
| Plaid Cymru | Dennis Morris | 122 | 22.1 | |
| Conservative | James Jonathon Thickitt | 58 | 10.5 | |
| Majority | | 249 | | |
| Independent hold | | Swing | | |

=== Goodwick ===
Goodwick 2017
| Party | Candidate | Votes | % | ±% |
|---|---|---|---|---|
| Independent | Kevin William Doolin | 262 | 42.4 | |
| Labour | Gwilym Patrick Price* | 234 | 37.9 | |
| Liberal Democrats | Richard John Grosvenor | 122 | 19.7 | |
| Majority | | 28 | | |
| Independent gain from Labour | | Swing | | |

=== Haverfordwest: Castle ===
Haverfordwest: Castle 2017
| Party | Candidate | Votes | % | ±% |
|---|---|---|---|---|
| Labour | Thomas Baden Tudor* | 483 | 58.3 | |
| Independent | Sally Williams | 190 | 22.9 | |
| Conservative | Kevin Lewis Davies | 155 | 18.7 | |
| Majority | | 293 | | |
| Labour hold | | Swing | | |

=== Haverfordwest Garth ===
Haverfordwest Garth 2017
| Party | Candidate | Votes | % | ±% |
|---|---|---|---|---|
| Independent | Lyndon Leslie Frayling* | 229 | 48.3 | |
| Independent | Sue Murray | 145 | 30.6 | |
| Conservative | Chris Evans-Thomas | 100 | 21.1 | |
| Majority | | 84 | | |
| Independent hold | | Swing | | |

=== Haverfordwest Portfield ===
Haverfordwest Portfield 2017
| Party | Candidate | Votes | % | ±% |
|---|---|---|---|---|
| Independent | Tim Evans | 436 | 54.0 | |
| Labour | Anthony William Griffiths | 199 | 24.7 | |
| Conservative | Martin Paul David Lewis | 172 | 21.3 | |
| Majority | | 237 | | |
| Independent hold | | Swing | | |

=== Haverfordwest Prendergast ===
Haverfordwest Prendergast 2017
| Party | Candidate | Votes | % | ±% |
|---|---|---|---|---|
| Labour | Alison Mary Tudor | 356 | 48.4 | |
| Conservative | Thomas Peter Lewis | 164 | 22.3 | |
| Independent | Chris Lee Harries | 109 | 14.8 | |
| Independent | Gitti Coats | 107 | 14.5 | |
| Majority | | 192 | | |
| Labour gain from Independent | | Swing | | |

=== Haverfordwest Priory ===
The sitting member was elected as an Independent in 2012.

Haverfordwest Priory 2017
| Party | Candidate | Votes | % | ±% |
|---|---|---|---|---|
| Conservative | David Michael Bryan* | Unopposed | | |
| Conservative gain from Independent | | | | |

=== Hundleton ===
Hundleton 2017
| Party | Candidate | Votes | % | ±% |
|---|---|---|---|---|
| Independent | Margot Magdalena Hanna Mechthild Bateman | 334 | 49.0 | |
| Conservative | Terence Keith Bradney | 174 | 25.6 | |
| Independent | Nicky Hancock | 104 | 15.3 | |
| Independent | Barry Edward Grange | 69 | 10.1 | |
| Majority | | 160 | | |
| Independent hold | | Swing | | |

=== Johnston ===
Johnston 2017
| Party | Candidate | Votes | % | ±% |
|---|---|---|---|---|
| Independent | Kenneth Rowlands* | 335 | 42.5 | |
| Independent | Phillip Walter Hart | 313 | 39.7 | |
| Labour | Rhys Daniel Evans | 141 | 17.9 | |
| Majority | | 22 | | |
| Independent hold | | Swing | | |

=== Kilgetty / Begelly ===
Kilgetty / Begelly 2017
| Party | Candidate | Votes | % | ±% |
|---|---|---|---|---|
| Independent | David John Pugh* | 319 | 46.4 | |
| Plaid Cymru | Gretta Elaine Marshall | 212 | 30.8 | |
| Independent | Peter John Adams | 157 | 22.8 | |
| Majority | | 107 | | |
| Independent hold | | Swing | | |

=== Lampeter Velfrey ===
Lampeter Velfrey 2017
| Party | Candidate | Votes | % | ±% |
|---|---|---|---|---|
| Independent | David Simpson* | Unopposed | | |
| Independent hold | | | | |

=== Lamphey ===
Lamphey 2017
| Party | Candidate | Votes | % | ±% |
|---|---|---|---|---|
| Independent | Tessa Hodgson* | 457 | 64.1 | |
| Independent | Rob Kenningford | 256 | 35.9 | |
| Majority | | 201 | | |
| Independent hold | | Swing | | |

=== Letterston ===
Tom Richards, who had held the seat as an Independent since 1995, chose to contest as a Conservative having only narrowly defeated a Conservative in 2012.

Letterston 2017
| Party | Candidate | Votes | % | ±% |
|---|---|---|---|---|
| Independent | Michelle Elizabeth Bateman | 575 | 55.6 | |
| Plaid Cymru | Owain Llyr Williams | 236 | 22.8 | |
| Conservative | Thomas James Richards* | 224 | 21.6 | |
| Majority | | 339 | | |
| Independent hold | | Swing | | |

=== Llangwm ===
Llangwm 2017
| Party | Candidate | Votes | % | ±% |
|---|---|---|---|---|
| Independent | Michael James John* | Unopposed | | |
| Independent hold | | | | |

=== Llanrhian ===
Llanrhian 2017
| Party | Candidate | Votes | % | ±% |
|---|---|---|---|---|
| Independent | Neil David Prior | 332 | 47.8 | |
| Conservative | William John Evans | 159 | 22.9 | |
| Independent | Alan Nigel Price | 155 | 22.3 | |
| Plaid Cymru | Chris John | 48 | 6.9 | |
| Majority | | 173 | | |
| Independent hold | | Swing | | |

=== Maenclochog ===
Maenclochog 2017
| Party | Candidate | Votes | % | ±% |
|---|---|---|---|---|
| Independent | Huw Meredydd George* | 657 | 54.6 | |
| Plaid Cymru | Hefin Wyn | 547 | 45.4 | |
| Majority | | 110 | | |
| Independent hold | | Swing | | |

=== Manorbier ===
Manorbier 2017
| Party | Candidate | Votes | % | ±% |
|---|---|---|---|---|
| Independent | Philip Kidney* | Unopposed | | |
| Independent hold | | | | |

=== Martletwy ===
Martletwy 2017
| Party | Candidate | Votes | % | ±% |
|---|---|---|---|---|
| Conservative | Di Clements | 591 | 69.2 | |
| Independent | Robert Mark Lewis* | 263 | 30.8 | |
| Majority | | 328 | | |
| Conservative gain from Independent | | Swing | | |

=== Merlin’s Bridge ===
Merlin's Bridge 2017
| Party | Candidate | Votes | % | ±% |
|---|---|---|---|---|
| Independent | Vincent John Cole | 337 | 52.3 | |
| Independent | Paul Edmond Davies | 156 | 24.2 | |
| Independent | Mary Umelda Havard* | 151 | 23.4 | |
| Majority | | 181 | | |
| Independent hold | | Swing | | |

=== Milford Central ===
Stephen Joseph was elected as a Plaid Cymru candidate in 2012 but subsequently left the party.

Milford Central 2017
| Party | Candidate | Votes | % | ±% |
|---|---|---|---|---|
| Independent | Stephen Glanville Joseph* | 137 | 25.3 | |
| Independent | Lynne Elizabeth Turner | 134 | 24.7 | |
| Labour | Charles Davies | 118 | 21.8 | |
| Conservative | Tony Miles | 113 | 20.8 | |
| Independent | Meurig Caffery | 40 | 7.4 | |
| Majority | | 3 | | |
| Independent gain from Plaid Cymru | | Swing | | |

=== Milford East ===
Milford East 2017
| Party | Candidate | Votes | % | ±% |
|---|---|---|---|---|
| Labour | Guy Woodham* | Unopposed | | |
| Labour hold | | | | |

=== Milford Hakin ===
Milford Hakin 2017
| Party | Candidate | Votes | % | ±% |
|---|---|---|---|---|
| Independent | Robert Michael Stoddart* | 336 | 45.5 | |
| Labour | Jon Thrower | 225 | 30.5 | |
| Independent | David Henry Worrall | 78 | 10.6 | |
| Independent | William Dean Elliott | 68 | 9.2 | |
| Independent | Rhys Williams | 31 | 4.2 | |
| Majority | | 111 | | |
| Independent hold | | Swing | | |

=== Milford Hubberston ===
Milford Hubberston 2017
| Party | Candidate | Votes | % | ±% |
|---|---|---|---|---|
| Independent | Vivien Stoddart* | 357 | 54.8 | |
| Labour | Alun Emanuel Byrne | 163 | 25.0 | |
| Independent | Rose Davinia Gray | 132 | 20.2 | |
| Majority | | 194 | | |
| Independent hold | | Swing | | |

=== Milford North ===
Milford North 2017
| Party | Candidate | Votes | % | ±% |
|---|---|---|---|---|
| Conservative | Stanley Thomas Hudson* | 487 | 60.4 | |
| Independent | Colin Alan Sharp | 319 | 39.6 | |
| Majority | | 168 | | |
| Conservative hold | | Swing | | |

=== Milford West ===
Milford West 2017
| Party | Candidate | Votes | % | ±% |
|---|---|---|---|---|
| Plaid Cymru | David Rhys Sinnett* | 305 | 62.2 | |
| Labour | Yvonne Grace Southwell | 118 | 24.1 | |
| Independent | Carol Stevens | 67 | 13.7 | |
| Majority | | 187 | | |
| Plaid Cymru hold | | Swing | | |

=== Narberth ===
Narberth 2017
| Party | Candidate | Votes | % | ±% |
|---|---|---|---|---|
| Labour | Vic Dennis | 329 | 42.5 | |
| Independent | Sue Rees | 301 | 38.8 | |
| Conservative | Edward Rayner Peet | 145 | 18.7 | |
| Majority | | 28 | | |
| Labour gain from Independent | | Swing | | |

=== Narberth Rural ===
Narberth Rural 2017
| Party | Candidate | Votes | % | ±% |
|---|---|---|---|---|
| Independent | Elwyn Albert Morse* | unopposed | | |
| Independent hold | | Swing | | |

=== Newport ===
Newport 2017
| Party | Candidate | Votes | % | ±% |
|---|---|---|---|---|
| Independent | Norman Paul Harries* | unopposed | | |
| Independent hold | | Swing | | |

=== Neyland East ===
Neyland East 2017
| Party | Candidate | Votes | % | ±% |
|---|---|---|---|---|
| Independent | Simon Leslie Hancock* | 763 | 89.4 | |
| Plaid Cymru | Aelwen Mair Lee | 79 | 10.6 | |
| Majority | | 684 | | |
| Independent hold | | Swing | | |

=== Neyland West ===
Neyland West 2017
| Party | Candidate | Votes | % | ±% |
|---|---|---|---|---|
| Labour | Paul Nigel Miller* | 512 | 70.2 | |
| Independent | Brian Leslie Rothero | 217 | 29.8 | |
| Majority | | 295 | | |
| Labour hold | | Swing | | |

=== Pembroke Monkton ===
Pembroke Monkton 2017
| Party | Candidate | Votes | % | ±% |
|---|---|---|---|---|
| Independent | Pearl Llewellyn* | 208 | | |
| Independent | Chris Doyle | 138 | | |
| Majority | | 70 | | |
| Independent hold | | Swing | | |

=== Pembroke St Mary North ===
Pembroke St Mary North 2017
| Party | Candidate | Votes | % | ±% |
|---|---|---|---|---|
| Conservative | Dai Boswell | 217 | 39.5 | |
| Independent | Jon Harvey | 211 | 38.4 | |
| Labour | David William Edwards | 122 | 22.2 | |
| Majority | | 6 | | |
| Conservative gain from Independent | | Swing | | |

=== Pembroke St Mary South ===
Pembroke St Mary South 2017
| Party | Candidate | Votes | % | ±% |
|---|---|---|---|---|
| Conservative | Aaron Leigh Carey | 181 | 38.1 | |
| Independent | Melanie Anne Phillips | 109 | 22.9 | |
| Independent | Daphne Margaret Jane Bush* | 94 | 19.8 | |
| Independent | Jacob David Taylor | 91 | 19.2 | |
| Majority | | 72 | | |
| Conservative gain from Independent | | Swing | | |

=== Pembroke St Michael ===
Pembroke St Michael 2017
| Party | Candidate | Votes | % | ±% |
|---|---|---|---|---|
| Conservative | Aden Arthur Brinn | 557 | 56.7 | |
| Independent | Jonathan Anthony Robert Nutting* | 425 | 43.3 | |
| Majority | | 132 | | |
| Conservative gain from Independent | | Swing | | |

=== Pembroke Dock Central ===
Pembroke Dock Central 2017
| Party | Candidate | Votes | % | ±% |
|---|---|---|---|---|
| Independent | Paul Heywood Dowson | 102 | 26.0 | |
| Independent | Terry Wayne Judkins | 98 | 25.0 | |
| Labour | Maureen Bowen | 81 | 20.6 | |
| Independent | Phil Gwyther | 78 | 19.8 | |
| Independent | George Frederick Manning | 21 | 5.3 | |
| Plaid Cymru | Richard Day | 13 | 3.3 | |
| Majority | | 4 | 1.0 | |
| Independent hold | | Swing | | |

=== Pembroke Dock Llanion ===
Pembroke Dock Llanion 2017
| Party | Candidate | Votes | % | ±% |
|---|---|---|---|---|
| Labour | Joshua Beynon | 290 | 35.8 | |
| Independent | Peter Frederick Stanley Kraus | 281 | 34.7 | |
| Independent | William Skyrme Rees | 239 | 29.5 | |
| Majority | | 9 | 1.1 | |
| Labour hold | | Swing | | |

=== Pembroke Dock Market ===
Pembroke Dock Market 2017
| Party | Candidate | Votes | % | ±% |
|---|---|---|---|---|
| Independent | Brian John Hall* | 300 | 58.1 | |
| Independent | Hayley Suzanne Wood | 216 | 41.9 | |
| Majority | | 84 | 16.2 | |
| Independent hold | | Swing | | |

=== Pembroke Dock Pennar ===
Pembroke Dock Pennar 2017
| Party | Candidate | Votes | % | ±% |
|---|---|---|---|---|
| Labour | Anthony Wilcox* | 727 | 75.3 | |
| Independent | Allan Trevor Brookes | 239 | 24.7 | |
| Majority | | 488 | 50.6 | |
| Labour hold | | Swing | | |

=== Penally ===
Penally 2017
| Party | Candidate | Votes | % | ±% |
|---|---|---|---|---|
| Plaid Cymru | Jonathan Spencer Preston* | 362 | 56.6 | |
| Conservative | Christine Elizabeth Toy | 289 | 44.4 | |
| Majority | | 73 | | |
| Plaid Cymru hold | | Swing | | |

=== Rudbaxton ===
Steve Yelland was elected as an Independent in 2012, defeating the sitting Conservative candidate

Rudbaxton 2017
| Party | Candidate | Votes | % | ±% |
|---|---|---|---|---|
| Conservative | Steve Yelland* | 273 | 64.2 | |
| Independent | Ryan Luke Dansie | 80 | 18.8 | |
| Independent | Raymond Burgess | 72 | 16.9 | |
| Majority | | 201 | | |
| Conservative gain from Independent | | Swing | | |

=== St David's ===
St David's 2017
| Party | Candidate | Votes | % | ±% |
|---|---|---|---|---|
| Independent | David Gareth Beechey Lloyd* | 419 | 50.8 | |
| Labour | Alan Charles York | 406 | 49.2 | |
| Majority | | 13 | | |
| Independent hold | | Swing | | |

=== St Dogmaels ===
St Dogmaels 2017
| Party | Candidate | Votes | % | ±% |
|---|---|---|---|---|
| Independent | David Griffith Michael James* | 694 | 69.8 | |
| Labour | Howard Stephen Balmer | 183 | 18.4 | |
| Independent | Elfyn Owen Rees | 117 | 11.8 | |
| Majority | | 511 | | |
| Independent hold | | Swing | | |

=== St Ishmael's ===
St Ishmael's 2017
| Party | Candidate | Votes | % | ±% |
|---|---|---|---|---|
| Independent | Reg Owens* | unopposed | | |
| Independent hold | | Swing | | |

=== Saundersfoot ===
Saundersfoot 2017
| Party | Candidate | Votes | % | ±% |
|---|---|---|---|---|
| Independent | Philip Raymond Baker* | 588 | 64.6 | |
| Independent | Rosemary Rebecca Hayes | 322 | 35.4 | |
| Majority | | 266 | | |
| Independent hold | | Swing | | |

=== Scleddau ===
Owen Watkin James was elected as a Conservative in 2008 and 2012.

Scleddau 2017
| Party | Candidate | Votes | % | ±% |
|---|---|---|---|---|
| Conservative | Samuel Deri Kurtz | 287 | 48.2 | |
| Independent | Owen Watkin James* | 205 | 34.5 | |
| Labour | Paul Frederick Stonhold | 103 | 17.3 | |
| Majority | | 82 | | |
| Conservative hold | | Swing | | |

=== Solva ===
Solva 2017
| Party | Candidate | Votes | % | ±% |
|---|---|---|---|---|
| Conservative | Mark Metson Carter | 338 | 48.3 | |
| Labour | Joshua David Phillips | 287 | 41.0 | |
| Green | Janie Anne Harwood | 75 | 10.7 | |
| Majority | | 51 | | |
| Conservative gain from Independent | | Swing | | |

=== Tenby North ===
Tenby North 2017
| Party | Candidate | Votes | % | ±% |
|---|---|---|---|---|
| Plaid Cymru | Michael Williams* | unopposed | | |
| Plaid Cymru hold | | Swing | | |

=== Tenby South ===
Tenby South 2017
| Party | Candidate | Votes | % | ±% |
|---|---|---|---|---|
| Independent | Michael Evans* | unopposed | | |
| Independent hold | | Swing | | |

=== The Havens ===
The Havens 2017
| Party | Candidate | Votes | % | ±% |
|---|---|---|---|---|
| Independent | Peter John Morgan* | 346 | 59.2 | |
| Conservative | Gordon William Smith | 238 | 40.8 | |
| Majority | | 108 | | |
| Independent hold | | Swing | | |

=== Wiston ===
Wiston 2017
| Party | Candidate | Votes | % | ±% |
|---|---|---|---|---|
| Conservative | David Kenneth Howlett* | 563 | 72.7 | |
| Independent | Isabelle May Solomon | 211 | 27.3 | |
| Majority | | 352 | | |
| Conservative hold | | Swing | | |
