= Merlin's Bridge =

Village and community in Pembrokeshire, Wales

Merlin's Bridge: Welsh: Pont Fadlen
- Location within Pembrokeshire
- Population: 2,202
- OS grid reference: SM946143
- Principal area: Pembrokeshire
- Preserved county: Dyfed
- Country: Wales
- Sovereign state: United Kingdom
- Post town: HAVERFORDWEST
- Postcode district: SA61
- Dialling code: 01437
- Police: Dyfed-Powys
- Fire: Mid and West Wales
- Ambulance: Welsh
- UK Parliament: Preseli Pembrokeshire
- Senedd Cymru – Welsh Parliament: Ceredigion Penfro
- List of places UK Wales Pembrokeshire 51.7903°N 4.9789°W Map of the community

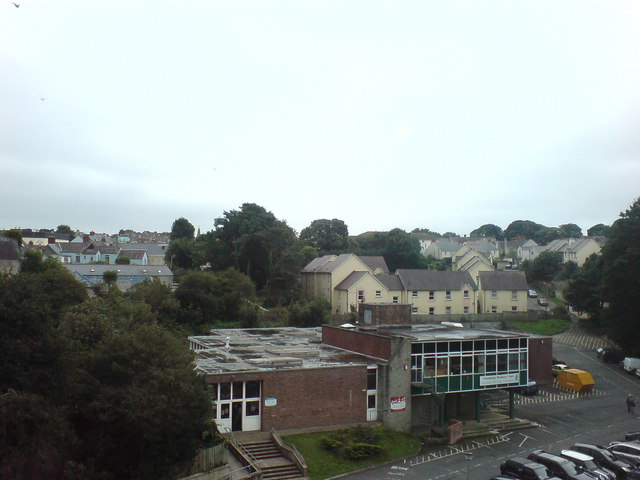
The community centre between Dew Street and Barn Street (Barn Court is in the background) on the site of the previous Pembrokeshire College (2008)

Merlin's Bridge (Welsh: Bont Myrddin or Pont Fadlen) is a village and a community south of, and contiguous with, Haverfordwest, Pembrokeshire, on the A4076 to Milford Haven.

Merlin's Bridge has its own elected community council which meets monthly, and is an electoral ward to Pembrokeshire County Council, electing one county councillor. The community had a population of 2,202 in the 2011 census.

The village has a community centre, a post office and a creamery.

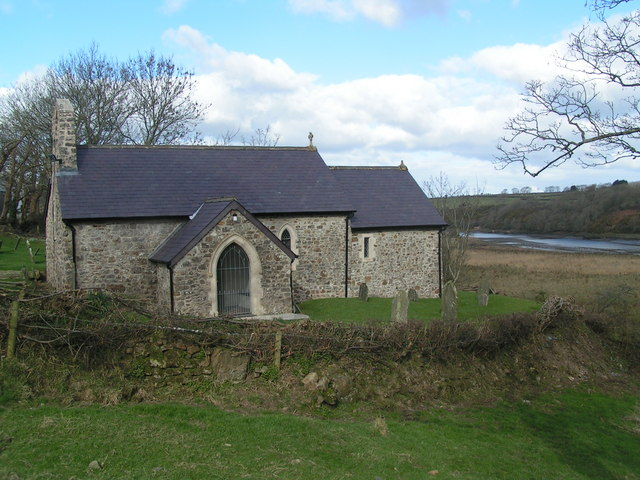
Haroldstone Chapel, Merlins Bridge

== Worship ==
The English Wesleyan Methodist Chapel, Emmanuel Christian Centre, and St Mark's Chapel, the three places of worship in Merlin's Bridge, are all buildings noted by the Royal Commission on the Ancient and Historical Monuments of Wales (Coflein).

== Sport ==
The village's football team won The Senior Cup and League double in 2002. There is a boxing club.

== War memorial ==
The marble War Memorial, sculpted by Edwards and Lewis of Haverfordwest, is at the end of Magdalen Street and can be viewed from Dredgman Hill.
