= Milford Central =

Coordinates: 51.714°N 5.032°W

- Electoral ward
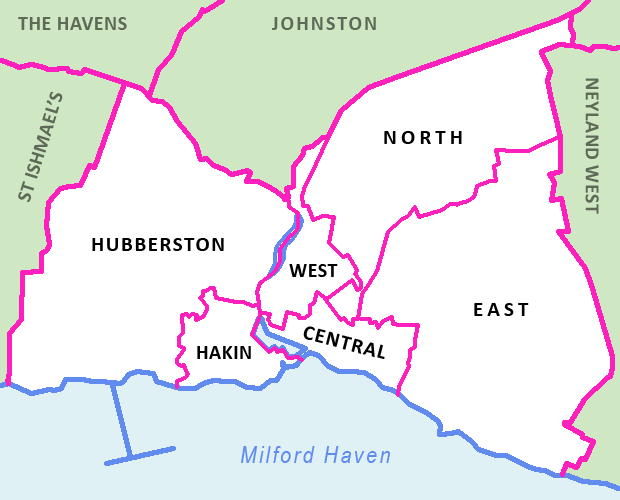
- Ward locations within the town of Milford Haven

- Location within Pembrokeshire
- Population: 2,003 (2011 census)
- Principal area: Pembrokeshire
- Country: Wales
- Sovereign state: United Kingdom
- Post town: MILFORD HAVEN
- Postcode district: SA73
- Dialling code: +44-1646
- UK Parliament: Preseli Pembrokeshire
- Senedd Cymru – Welsh Parliament: Preseli Pembrokeshire
- Councillors: 1 (County); 3 (Town Council)

Milford Central is an electoral ward in Pembrokeshire, Wales. It covers the central area of the town of Milford Haven including Pill and Milford Haven Docks. It elects a county councillor to Pembrokeshire County Council and three town councillors to Milford Haven Town Council.

According to the 2011 UK Census the population of the ward was 2,003 (with 1,658 of voting age).

== County elections ==
At the May 2017 county election the sitting former Plaid Cymru councillor Stephen Joseph successfully defended his seat but by only 3 votes.

2017 Pembrokeshire County Council election
Party	Candidate	Votes	%	±%
Independent	Stephen Joseph	137		
Independent	Lynne Turner	134		
Labour	Charles Davies	118		
Conservative	Tony Miles	113		
Independent	Meurig Caffrey	40		

At the 2012 county election the long-standing independent councillor Anne Hughes lost her seat on Pembrokeshire County Council to the Plaid Cymru candidate. Hughes had been elected the chairman of the County Council in May 2009.

2012 Pembrokeshire County Council election
Party	Candidate	Votes	%	±%
Plaid Cymru	Stephen Glanville Joseph	421		
Independent	Anne Hughes	224		
Independent	Tony Miles	48		

== See also ==
- Milford Hakin
- Milford West
- List of electoral wards in Pembrokeshire
