= Martletwy (electoral ward) =

Coordinates: 51.77°N 4.86°W

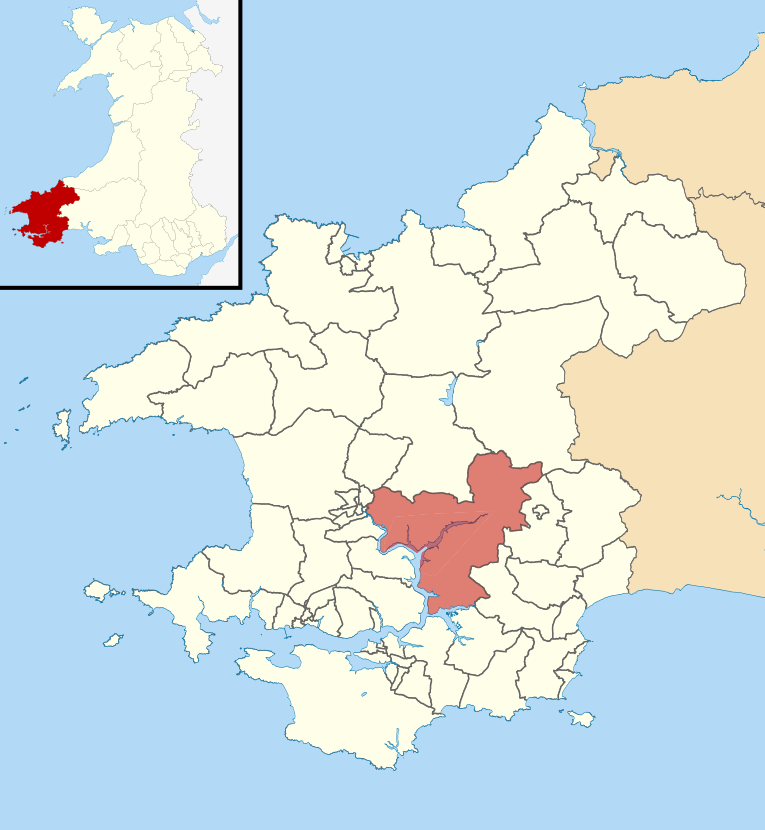
Location of the Martletwy ward within Pembrokeshire

Martletwy is an electoral ward in Pembrokeshire, Wales. It is bordered to the west by the River Cleddau and includes three communities within its boundaries, namely Llawhaden, Martletwy, and Uzmaston, Boulston and Slebech. The ward elects a councillor to Pembrokeshire County Council.

According to the 2011 UK Census the population of the ward was 1,970.

== County elections ==
Martletwy has been a ward to Pembrokeshire County Council since 1995.

At the May 2017 Pembrokeshire County Council election the sitting Independent councillor was beaten by the Welsh Conservative Party candidate, Di Clements.

2017 Pembrokeshire County Council election
Party	Candidate	Votes	%	±%
Conservative	Di Clements	591		
Independent	Rob Lewis *	263		

Lewis had represented the ward since May 2004. He had been a member of the ruling Independent Plus Political Group which had suffered heavy losses in 2017, losing almost two thirds of its councillors.
