= Hook, Pembrokeshire =

Village and community in Pembrokeshire, Wales

Hook
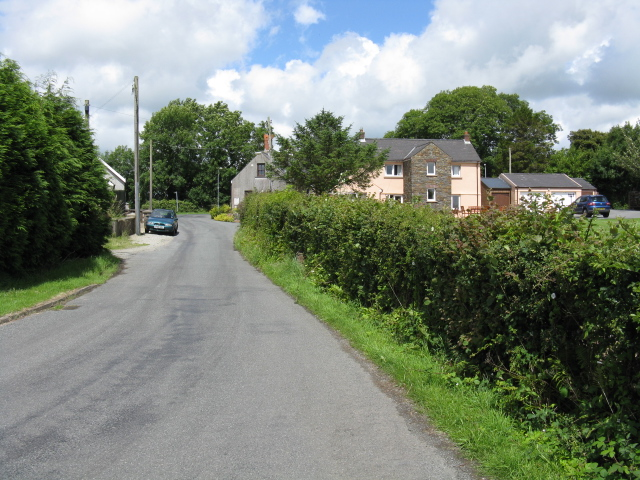
- Hook - Lane To Underwood

- Location within Pembrokeshire
- Population: 838
- OS grid reference: SM979111
- Principal area: Pembrokeshire
- Country: Wales
- Sovereign state: United Kingdom
- Post town: Haverfordwest
- Postcode district: SA62
- Police: Dyfed-Powys
- Fire: Mid and West Wales
- Ambulance: Welsh
- UK Parliament: Preseli Pembrokeshire
- Senedd Cymru – Welsh Parliament: Ceredigion Penfro
- List of places UK Wales Pembrokeshire 51.762°N 4.929°W Map of the community

Hook is a village and community on the Western Cleddau, Pembrokeshire, Wales, in the ecclesiastical parish of Llangwm.

== Name ==
The name could be derived from the nearby hook-shaped peninsula.

== History ==
Hook Woods are shown on a 1578 parish map. An 1833 gazetteer described Hook Quay as a place for loading coal for shipping. Although there is little or no trace of it to be found today, Hook once had a worldwide reputation as a mining village; anthracite was mined and exported across the world. Maps drawn in the 19th century show collieries.

== Demography ==
The population of the community was 656 in 2001. Together with the communities of Freystrop and Llangwm, it makes up the Pembrokeshire ward of Llangwm. It rose to 838 in 2011.

== Amenities ==
Hook has a school, two places of worship, a social club and a wide range of organisations ranging from short mat bowls to a History Society, and a long-established cricket club with trophy-winning men's, ladies' and junior teams.
