= Narberth (electoral ward) =

Coordinates: 51.799°N 4.742°W

- Electoral ward
- Location within Pembrokeshire
- Population: 1,923 (2011 census)
- Community: Caernarfon
- Principal area: Pembrokeshire
- Country: Wales
- Sovereign state: United Kingdom
- Post town: NARBERTH
- Dialling code: 01834
- UK Parliament: Mid and South Pembrokeshire
- Senedd Cymru – Welsh Parliament: Carmarthen West and South Pembrokeshire
- Councillors: 1 (County)

Narberth is an electoral ward in Pembrokeshire, Wales. Since 1995, it has elected one councillor to Pembrokeshire County Council.

The current Narberth county ward covers the immediate built-up area of the town of Narberth, matching the boundaries of the town/community ward of Narberth Urban. The remainder of the Narberth community (encircling the town) together with the Templeton community forms the Narberth Rural ward.

The Narberth ward population, according to the 2011 Census, was 1,923.

== Dyfed County Council ==
Prior to 1996, Narberth was a county ward to Dyfed County Council (abolished 1996), electing one councillor at the 1989 and 1993 elections. The ward also covered Lampeter Velfrey and Martletwy.

== Pembrokeshire County Council ==
Since 1995, Narberth has been an electoral ward to Pembrokeshire County Council, electing one county councillor. Councillor (Thomas) David Watkins was elected unopposed in 1995 and 1999, firstly as an independent and subsequently for the Labour Party. He lost to an independent candidate, Wynne Evans, at the June 2004 elections. Evans resigned suddenly from his positions on Narberth Town Council in June 2006, not long after being elected as Mayor of Narberth, because he was unable to cope with the combined responsibilities of his community and county roles. He remained as county councillor until 2017.

At the May 2017 elections, UNISON trade union secretary Vic Dennis won the ward back for the Labour Party. In the 2022 election, the seat was retained for Labour by Marc Tierney.

== See also ==
- List of electoral wards in Pembrokeshire
