= Milford West =

Coordinates: 51.718°N 5.037°W

- Electoral ward
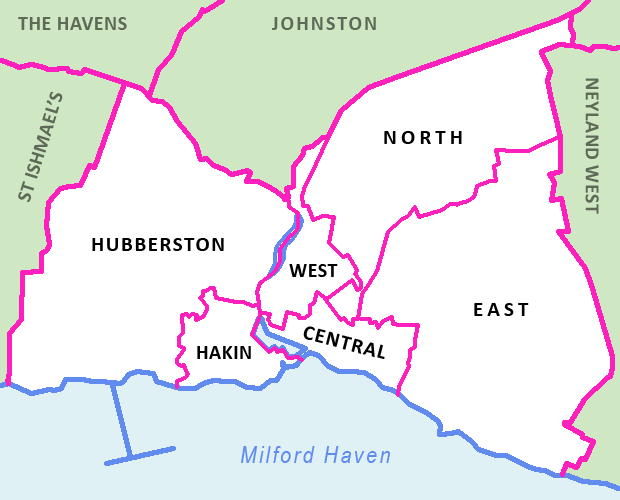
- Ward locations within the town of Milford Haven

- Location within Pembrokeshire
- Population: 2,254 (2011 census)
- Principal area: Pembrokeshire
- Country: Wales
- Sovereign state: United Kingdom
- Post town: MILFORD HAVEN
- Postcode district: SA73
- Dialling code: +44-1646
- UK Parliament: Preseli Pembrokeshire
- Senedd Cymru – Welsh Parliament: Preseli Pembrokeshire
- Councillors: 1 (County); 3 (Town Council)

Milford West is an electoral ward in Pembrokeshire, Wales. It covers the area of the town of Milford Haven immediately east of Milford Haven railway station and Hubberston Pill.

The ward elects a county councillor to Pembrokeshire County Council and three town councillors to Milford Haven Town Council.

According to the 2011 UK Census the population of the ward was 2,254 (with 1,709 being of voting age).

== County elections ==
At the May 2017 county election the sitting Plaid Cymru councillor Rhys Sinnett retained his seat.

2017 Pembrokeshire County Council election
| Party | Candidate | Votes | % | ±% |
|---|---|---|---|---|
| Plaid Cymru | Rhys Sinnett * | 305 | | |
| Labour | Yvonne Southwell | 118 | | |
| Independent | Carol Stevens | 67 | | |

* = sitting councillor prior to the election

== See also ==
- Milford Central
- Milford Hakin
- List of electoral wards in Pembrokeshire
