= Haverfordwest Castle (electoral ward) =

Coordinates: 51.80°N 4.97°W

- Electoral ward
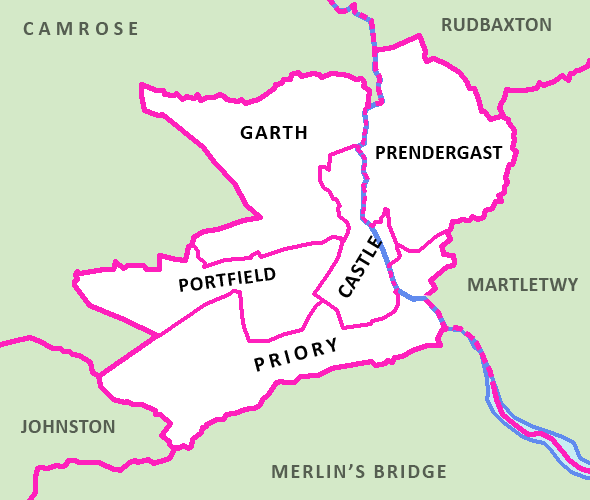
- Ward locations within the town of Haverfordwest

- Location within Pembrokeshire
- Population: 2,301 (2011 census)
- Principal area: Pembrokeshire
- Country: Wales
- Sovereign state: United Kingdom
- Post town: HAVERFORDWEST
- Postcode district: SA61
- Dialling code: +44-1437
- UK Parliament: Preseli Pembrokeshire
- Senedd Cymru – Welsh Parliament: Preseli Pembrokeshire
- Councillors: 1 (County); 3 (Town Council)

Haverfordwest Castle is an electoral ward in Pembrokeshire, Wales. It covers the centre of the town of Haverfordwest west of the river including the High Street, Winch Lane and north along Crowhill Road. It elects a councillor to Pembrokeshire County Council.

Castle ward also elects three community councillors to Haverfordwest Town Council.

According to the 2011 UK Census the population of the ward was 2,301 (with 1,855 of voting age).

== County elections ==
At the May 2012 and May 2017 election the county council seat was retained by Thomas Tudor for Welsh Labour. 2017 saw his wife Alison Tudor win the neighbouring Haverfordwest Prendergast seat.

2017 Pembrokeshire County Council election
Party	Candidate	Votes	%	±%
Labour	Thomas Baden Tudor	438		
Independent	Sally Williams	196		
Conservative	Kevin Lewis Davies	118		

2012 Pembrokeshire County Council election
Party	Candidate	Votes	%	±%
Labour	Thomas Baden Tudor	557		
Conservative	Sarah Marie Llewellyn	263		

Cllr Thomas Tudor has been a Pembrokeshire County Councillor for the seat since 1995.

== See also ==
- Haverfordwest Priory (electoral ward)
- List of electoral wards in Pembrokeshire
