= Rosemarket =

Village, parish and community in Pembrokeshire, Wales

Rosemarket: Welsh: Rhosfarced
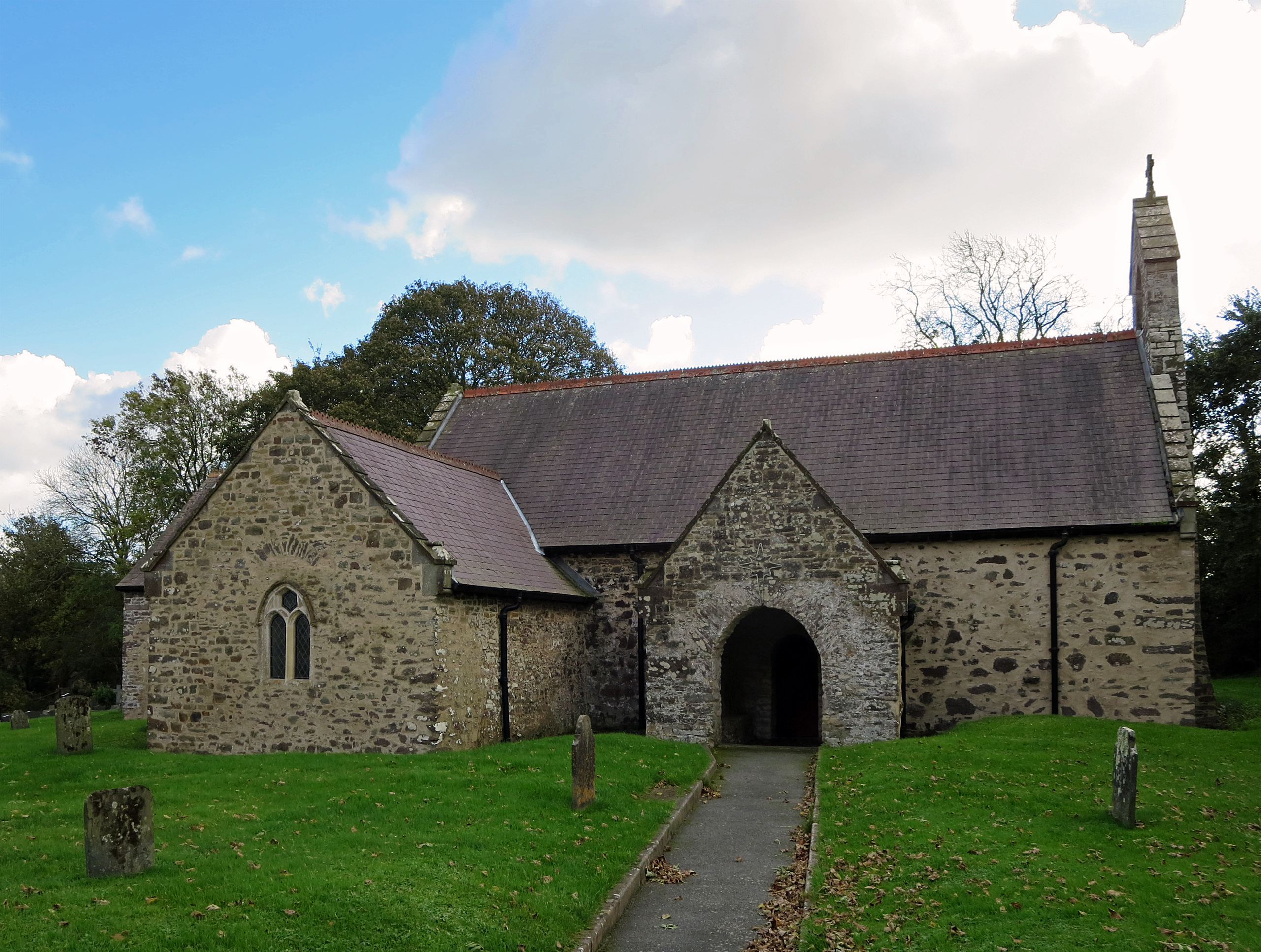
- St Ishmaels Parish Church

- Location within Pembrokeshire
- Population: 613 (2011)
- OS grid reference: SM929084
- Principal area: Pembrokeshire
- Country: Wales
- Sovereign state: United Kingdom
- Post town: Milford Haven
- Postcode district: SA73
- Dialling code: 01437
- Police: Dyfed-Powys
- Fire: Mid and West Wales
- Ambulance: Welsh
- UK Parliament: Preseli Pembrokeshire
- Senedd Cymru – Welsh Parliament: Ceredigion Penfro
- List of places UK Wales Pembrokeshire 51.74°N 5.0°W Map of the community

Rosemarket (Welsh: Rhosfarced) is a village, parish and community in Pembrokeshire, Wales, north of Milford Haven.

== Name ==
The name refers to the "Market of Rhos", the town formerly being an important market town for the Flemish settlers in the medieval cantref of Roose.

== History ==
The village was a marcher borough founded by the Knights Hospitallers in the 12th century. It appears on a 1578 parish map of Pembrokeshire. Owen, in 1603, described it as one of nine Pembrokeshire "boroughs in decay".

The parish church, like many in the former lands of Rhos, is dedicated to the 6th-century Breton prince and Welsh saint Ismael. The village has a medieval dovecote and a large hillfort.

== Local government ==
The village has its own elected community council and is part of the electoral ward of Burton for the purposes of elections to Pembrokeshire County Council.

== Notable people ==
- Zachariah Williams (1673?–1755), medical practitioner and inventor, born and lived at Rhosmarket.
- Anna Williams (1706–1783), a Welsh poet from Rhosmarket, a close companion of the writer Samuel Johnson.
