= Pembrokeshire College =

Location
- Merlins Bridge; West Wales; Haverfordwest, Pembrokeshire, SA61 1SZ; Wales; 51.7924°N 4.9814°W

Information
- School type: General Further Education
- Motto: To pursue excellence, empower individuals and develop the future workforce.
- Denomination: non-denominational
- Established: 1990
- Status: open
- Local authority: Pembrokeshire County Council
- Authority: LEA
- Principal: Dr Barry Walters
- Staff: >550
- Gender: mixed
- Age: 14 to 99
- Enrolment: c.2,000 full-time, c.12,500 part-time (full and part-time)
- Education system: National Curriculum
- Nickname: Pembs College
- Website: https://www.pembrokeshire.ac.uk/

Pembrokeshire College is a further education college with a campus in Haverfordwest, Pembrokeshire, in Wales.

The College provides full-time vocational education and A-level programmes for students aged 16+ and a variety of part-time and full time courses for adult learners and employers. The total number of enrolled students in full and part-time education is about 14,500. The College also offers NVQs and other accredited programmes, as well as the Welsh Baccalaureate Qualification. Certain courses, are funded by the Welsh Assembly Government.

The College canteen, known as 'the refectory' is franchised out to Chartwell's. It also has a Starbucks and a little shop.

== Sport ==
The College includes a Sports Academy that provides coaching in Football, Rugby and Netball
