= Pembroke Dock Market =

Coordinates: 51.6921°N 4.9497°W

- Electoral ward
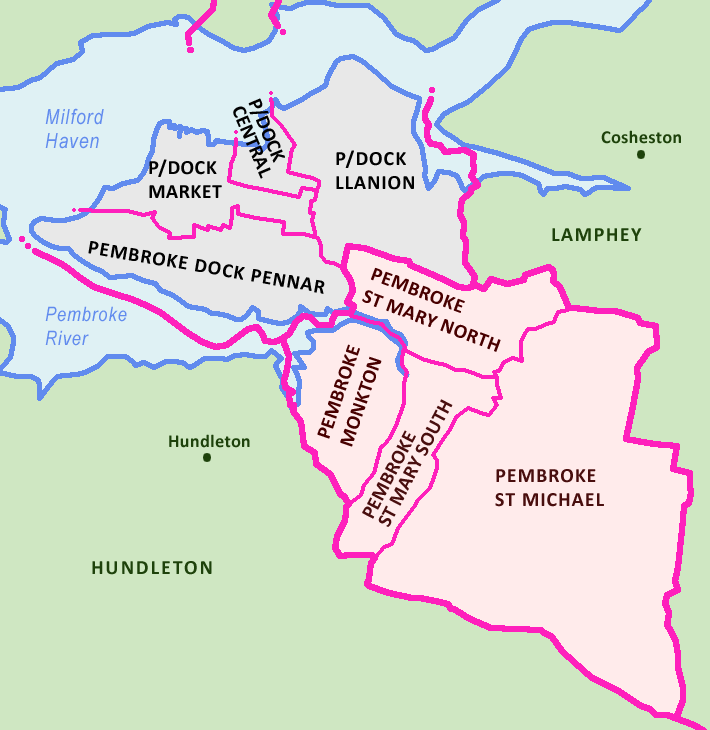
- Ward locations within the towns of Pembroke and Pembroke Dock

- Location within Pembrokeshire
- Population: 1,897 (2011 census)
- Principal area: Pembrokeshire
- Country: Wales
- Sovereign state: United Kingdom
- Post town: PEMBROKE DOCK
- Postcode district: SA72
- Dialling code: 01646
- UK Parliament: Carmarthen West and South Pembrokeshire
- Senedd Cymru – Welsh Parliament: Carmarthen West and South Pembrokeshire
- Councillors: 1 (County); 3 (Town Council)

Pembroke Dock Market is an electoral ward in the town of Pembroke Dock, Pembrokeshire, Wales.

== Description ==
Pembroke Dock Market ward covers the central area of the town between Bush Street and Milton Terrace, as well as Llanreath and Pembroke Dockyard. Pembroke Dock Pennar ward lies to the south and Pembroke Dock Central lies to the north.

The ward elects a county councillor to Pembrokeshire County Council and three town councillors to Pembroke Dock Town Council.

According to the 2011 UK Census the population of the ward was 1,897.

== Town Council elections ==
Town councillor and Pembroke Dock mayor Jane McNaughton resigned in November 2017 over the issue of dealing with alleged bullying of staff. A by-election took place on 22 March 2018 and local postmaster Terry Judkins won the seat with 147 votes on a 17.9% turnout.

== County Council elections ==
At the May 2017 county election the sitting Independent county councillor, Brian Hall, successfully defended his seat.

2017 Pembrokeshire County Council election
Party	Candidate	Votes	%	±%
Independent	Brian Hall *	300		
Independent	Hayley Wood	216		

* = sitting councillor prior to the election

== See also ==
- List of electoral wards in Pembrokeshire
