= Haverfordwest Priory (electoral ward) =

Coordinates: 51.794°N 4.975°W

- Electoral ward
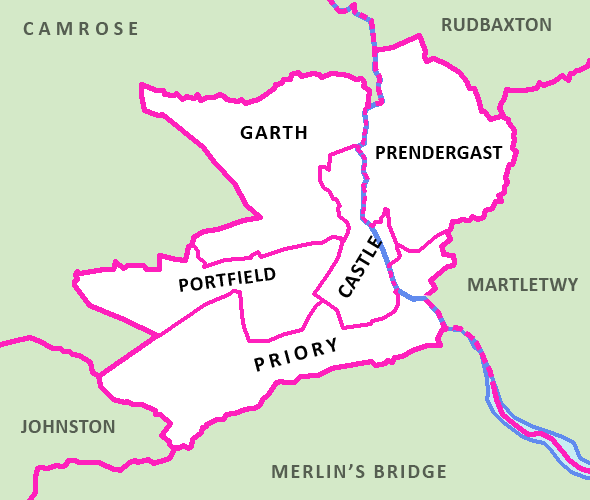
- Ward locations within the town of Haverfordwest
- Population: 2,496 (2011 census)
- Principal area: Pembrokeshire
- Country: Wales
- Sovereign state: United Kingdom
- Post town: HAVERFORDWEST
- Postcode district: SA61
- Dialling code: +44-1437
- UK Parliament: Preseli Pembrokeshire
- Senedd Cymru – Welsh Parliament: Preseli Pembrokeshire
- Councillors: 1 (County); 4 (Town Council)

Haverfordwest Priory is an electoral ward in Pembrokeshire, Wales. It covers the southern edge of the town of Haverfordwest, mostly west of the river but including Haverfordwest railway station at its eastern extreme, the Haverfordwest Priory from which it takes its name and the residential areas bounded by Freeman's Way and surrounding the Pembrokeshire College campus. The ward elects a councillor to Pembrokeshire County Council.

Priory ward also elects four community councillors to Haverfordwest Town Council.

According to the 2011 UK Census the population of the ward was 2,496 (with 1,971 of voting age).

== County elections ==
At the May 2017 Pembrokeshire County Council election the county council seat was retained unopposed by Cllr David Bryan who now sits as a Conservative Party representative.

At the 2012 Council elections Bryan was elected as a member of the council's Independent Group (and had been an Independent Group member for 8 years) but left the group shortly after the election to sit as an unaffiliated councillor.

2012 Pembrokeshire County Council election
Party	Candidate	Votes	%	±%
Independent	David Michael Bryan	684	86.6	
Independent	Byron Henry Frayling	103	13.0	

== See also ==
- Haverfordwest Castle (electoral ward)
- List of electoral wards in Pembrokeshire
