= Freystrop =

Village, parish and community in Pembrokeshire, Wales

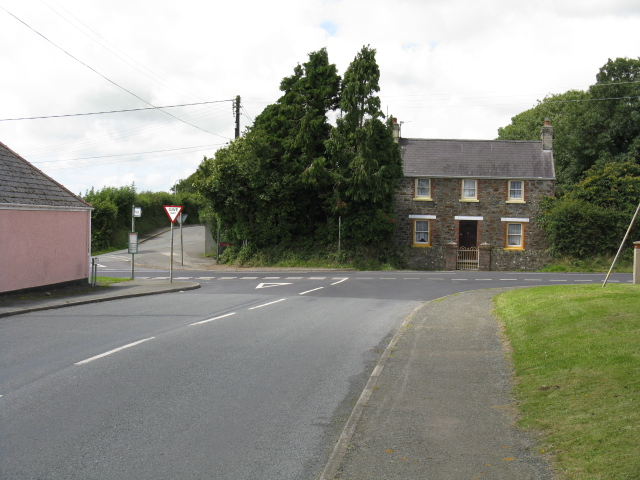

- Location within Pembrokeshire
- Population: 623 (2011)
- OS grid reference: SM9511
- Principal area: Pembrokeshire
- Country: Wales
- Sovereign state: United Kingdom
- Post town: HAVERFORDWEST
- Postcode district: SA62 4
- Dialling code: 01437
- Police: Dyfed-Powys
- Fire: Mid and West Wales
- Ambulance: Welsh
- UK Parliament: Preseli Pembrokeshire
- Senedd Cymru – Welsh Parliament: Ceredigion Penfro
- List of places UK Wales Pembrokeshire 51.7636°N 4.9606°W Map of the community

Freystrop is a village, parish and community in Pembrokeshire, Wales, 2 miles (3.2 km) southeast of Haverfordwest.

== History ==
Freystrop was under the Lordship of Haverford. The land was originally an open field and common land system in mediaeval times, with enclosure taking place in the 18th century. Alongside agriculture, coal had been mined, possibly seasonally by farmers and their workers. By the middle of the 19th century, coal mining had accelerated, alongside suppression of agriculture.

== Village ==
Over several centuries, two parts of the village developed, Lower Freystrop to the north, mostly of older properties, and newer Freystrop (or Freystrop Cross) with generally newer properties. There is a Congregational place of worship in the village.

== Parish ==
Freystrop parish, in the ancient Roose Hundred, in 1833 had a population of 636. The area of the parish is 1,637 acres (662 ha) and covers several settled areas to the west of the Western Cleddau. The parish church is dedicated to St Justinian, in the United Benefice of Roose, Church in Wales.

== Community ==
Freystrop Community Council comprises the villages of Lower Freystrop, Little Milford, Freystrop Cross, Maddox Moor and Troopers Inn. It is elected, and meets once a month except August and December. It manages the charitable Freystrop Village Hall.

=== Listed buildings ===
There are six listed buildings in the community, including a limekiln and milepost.
