= Peter Morgan (rugby union) =

British Lions & Wales international rugby union player (1959–2024)

- Born: Peter John Morgan; 1 January 1959 Broad Haven, Wales
- Died: 27 July 2024 (aged 65) Little Haven, Wales
- Height: 5 ft 10 in (178 cm)
- Weight: 12 st 6 lb (174 lb; 79 kg)
- School: Sir Thomas Picton School
- Occupation: coal merchant

Rugby union career
- Position: Centre
Amateur team(s)
Years	Team	Apps	(Points)
- Haverfordwest RFC
–	Llanelli RFC		
–	Sydney Welsh		
–	Pembrokeshire		
International career
Years	Team	Apps	(Points)
1980–1981	Wales	4	(0)
1980	British Lions	0	(0)

Peter John Morgan (1 January 1959 – 27 July 2024) was a Welsh international rugby union player. He played on the wing. In 1980, he toured South Africa with the British Lions and at the time played club rugby for Llanelli RFC.

== Playing career ==
Morgan played rugby from a young age including selection for the Welsh Youth team. After a spell playing with Haverfordwest RFC he switched to first class team Llanelli. In 1979 Morgan was a member of the Llanelli sevens team which won the Snelling Sevens and he was awarded the Everson Award as the player of the tournament. It was as a Llanelli player he was first selected for the Wales national team in the encounter with Scotland during the 1980 Five Nations Championship. In the same year he was chosen to represent the British Lions on their 1980 tour of South Africa. Although he was not selected for any of the Test matches, he played in seven regional encounters, scoring a try in a narrow win over Griqualand West.

Morgan played in four matches for Wales, including the 1980 game against the All Blacks at Cardiff.

== Later life and death ==
Morgan was elected to the Pembrokeshire County Council in 2008. Later, Morgan became chairman of the Council. He died of a brain tumour in Little Haven, on 27 July 2024, at the age of 65.
