= St David's (Pembrokeshire electoral ward) =

Coordinates: 51.882°N 5.264°W

- Electoral ward
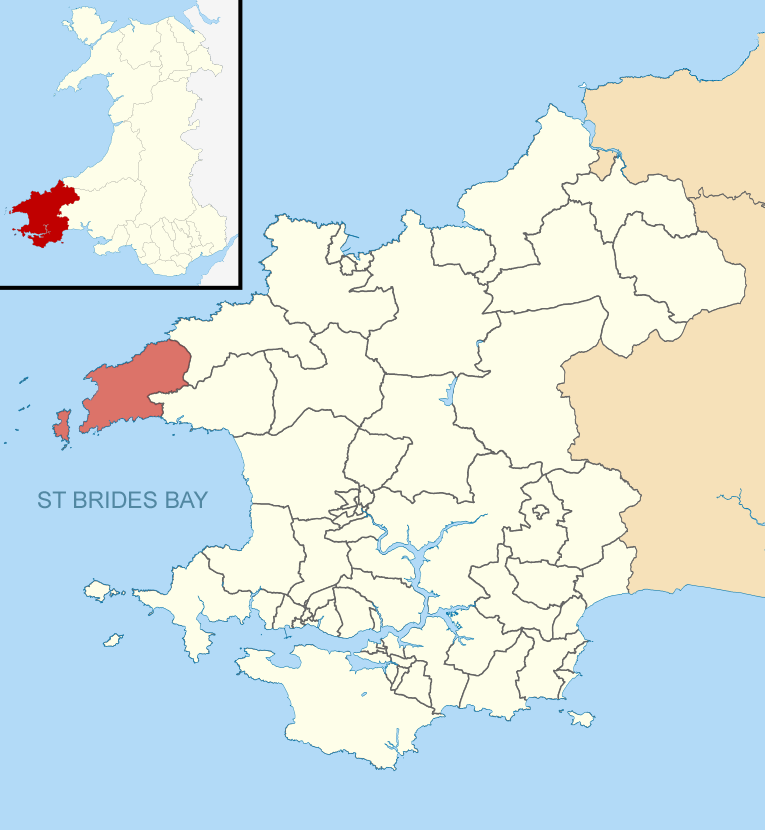
- Location of the St David's ward within Pembrokeshire
- Population: 1,841 (2011 census)
- Principal area: Pembrokeshire
- Country: Wales
- Sovereign state: United Kingdom
- Post town: HAVERFORDWEST
- Postcode district: SA62
- Dialling code: +44-1437
- UK Parliament: Preseli Pembrokeshire
- Senedd Cymru – Welsh Parliament: Preseli Pembrokeshire
- Councillors: 1 (County); 12 (City Council)

St David's is an electoral ward in Pembrokeshire, Wales. It covers the small city of St Davids and the ward's boundaries are coterminous with those of the community of St Davids and the Cathedral Close. The ward elects a councillor to Pembrokeshire County Council.

St Davids also elects twelve community councillors to St Davids City Council.

According to the 2011 UK Census the population of the ward was 1,841 (with 1,509 of voting age).

== County elections ==
At the May 2017 Pembrokeshire County Council election the county council seat was narrowly retained by sitting Independent Cllr David Lloyd with a much reduced majority.

2017 Pembrokeshire County Council election
| Party | Candidate | Votes | % | ±% |
|---|---|---|---|---|
| Independent | David Lloyd | 419 | | |
| Labour | Alan York | 406 | | |

Lloyd had previously stood as a Liberal Democrat but was elected for the first time standing as an independent in May 2012.
