= Burton (Pembrokeshire electoral ward) =

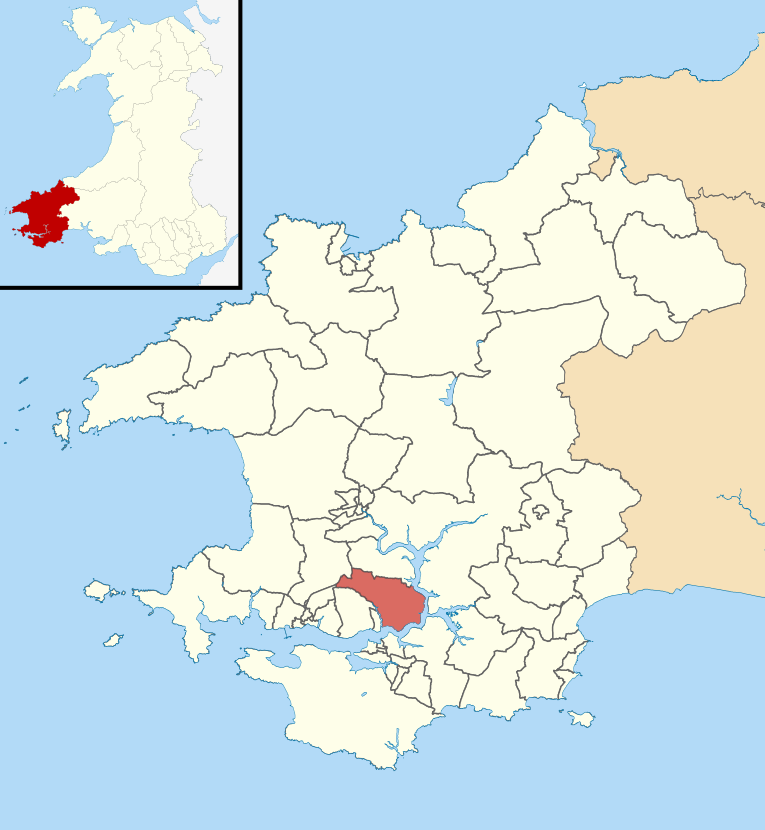
Location of the Burton ward within Pembrokeshire

Burton is an electoral ward in Pembrokeshire, Wales. The ward consists of the communities, of Burton and Rosemarket. The community of Burton consists of part of Pembrokeshire Coast National Park

A ward of Pembrokeshire County Council since 1995, it was previously a ward of the former Preseli Pembrokeshire District Council.

== History ==
At the first election for the new Pembrokeshire County Council in 1995, an Independent, previously a member of Preseli Pembrokeshire District Council was elected.

Burton 1995
Party	Candidate	Votes	%	±%
Independent	Lewis James Lloyd*	432	74.9	
Labour	Trevor Thomas	145	25.1	
Majority		287	49.8	
Independent hold		Swing		

At the second election, in 1999 the Conservative Party fielded candidates in Pembrokeshire for the first time and Burton was one of the three seats that were captured. David Wildman narrowly defeated the sitting Independent member.

Burton 1999
Party	Candidate	Votes	%	±%
Conservative	Roger David Wildman	276	41.2	+41.2
Independent	Lewis James Lloyd*	257	38.4	−36.5
Labour	Brian William Molyneaux	137	20.4	−4.5
Majority		19	2.8	
Conservative gain from Independent		Swing		

By the third election, in 2004 Wildman. having been elected as a Conservative in 1999, defeating the sitting Independent councillor, had subsequently joined the Independents himself.

Burton 2004
Party	Candidate	Votes	%	±%
Independent	Roger David Wildman*	620	84.1	+42.9
Liberal Democrats	Anthony Harold Miles	117	15.9	+15.9
Majority		503	68.2	
Independent hold		Swing		

Wildman was returned unopposed in 2008 and 2012.

A by-election was held in the Burton Ward on 11 April 2013 following the retirement of David Wildman. The successful candidate stood as an 'Independent Plus' candidate, supporting the ruling group on the authority.

-->

Burton by-election 2013
Party	Candidate	Votes	%	±%
Independent	Rob Summons	291		
Conservative	Robin Wilson	166		
Labour	Robin Howells	162		
Independent	Jon Harvey	46		
Majority				
Independent hold		Swing		
