= County Hall, Haverfordwest =

County building in Haverfordwest, Wales

County Hall
- Neuadd y Sir
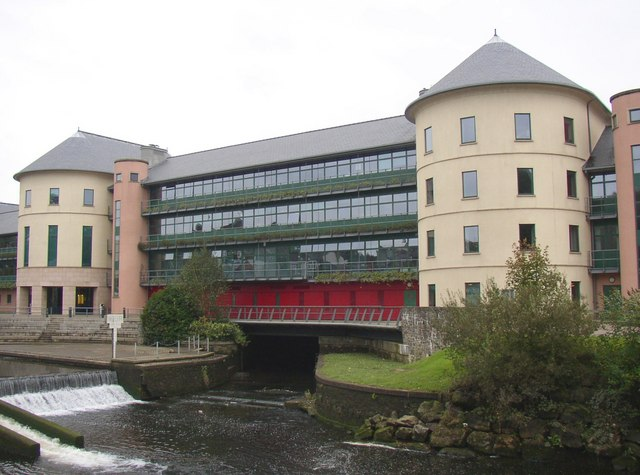

- Location within Pembrokeshire

General information
- Architectural style: Modern
- Location: County Hall; Freemens Way; Haverfordwest; SA61 1TP, Haverfordwest, United Kingdom
- Coordinates: 51.80169°N 4.96628°W
- Completed: 1999

Design and construction
- Architect: Tim Colquhoun

The County Hall (Welsh: Neuadd y Sir) is a municipal building on Freemens Way in Haverfordwest, Pembrokeshire, Wales. It was built in 1999 and serves as the offices and meeting place of Pembrokeshire County Council.

== History ==
An earlier Pembrokeshire County Council had existed from 1889 until 1974, when local government reorganisation abolished the administrative county of Pembrokeshire, splitting the area into two districts called Preseli (renamed Preseli Pembrokeshire in 1987) and South Pembrokeshire, both of which were within a new county of Dyfed. That first county council had met at Shire Hall, Haverfordwest, and from 1923 had its main administrative offices at a converted hospital on St Thomas's Green, Haverfordwest, called County Offices.

Further local government reorganisation in 1996 abolished Dyfed County Council and its constituent districts. A unitary authority called Pembrokeshire was created covering the combined area of the abolished Preseli Pembrokeshire and South Pembrokeshire districts. The new Pembrokeshire County Council inherited the former County Offices and Shire Hall from Dyfed County Council as well as Cambria House in Haverfordwest from Preseli Pembrokeshire District Council (which had been built in 1965 for Haverfordwest Rural District Council) and Llanion Park in Pembroke Dock from South Pembrokeshire District Council (which had been built in 1904 as part of Llanion Barracks and had become the headquarters of the old Pembroke Borough Council in the early 1970s).

The new Pembrokeshire County Council was elected in 1995, acting as a shadow authority until it formally assumed its powers in 1996. The shadow authority debated where the new council should meet, with arguments advanced in favour of Haverfordwest, Pembroke Dock and Milford Haven. It was decided initially to use Cambria House in Haverfordwest, but with full council meetings held at the larger council chamber in the old Shire Hall.

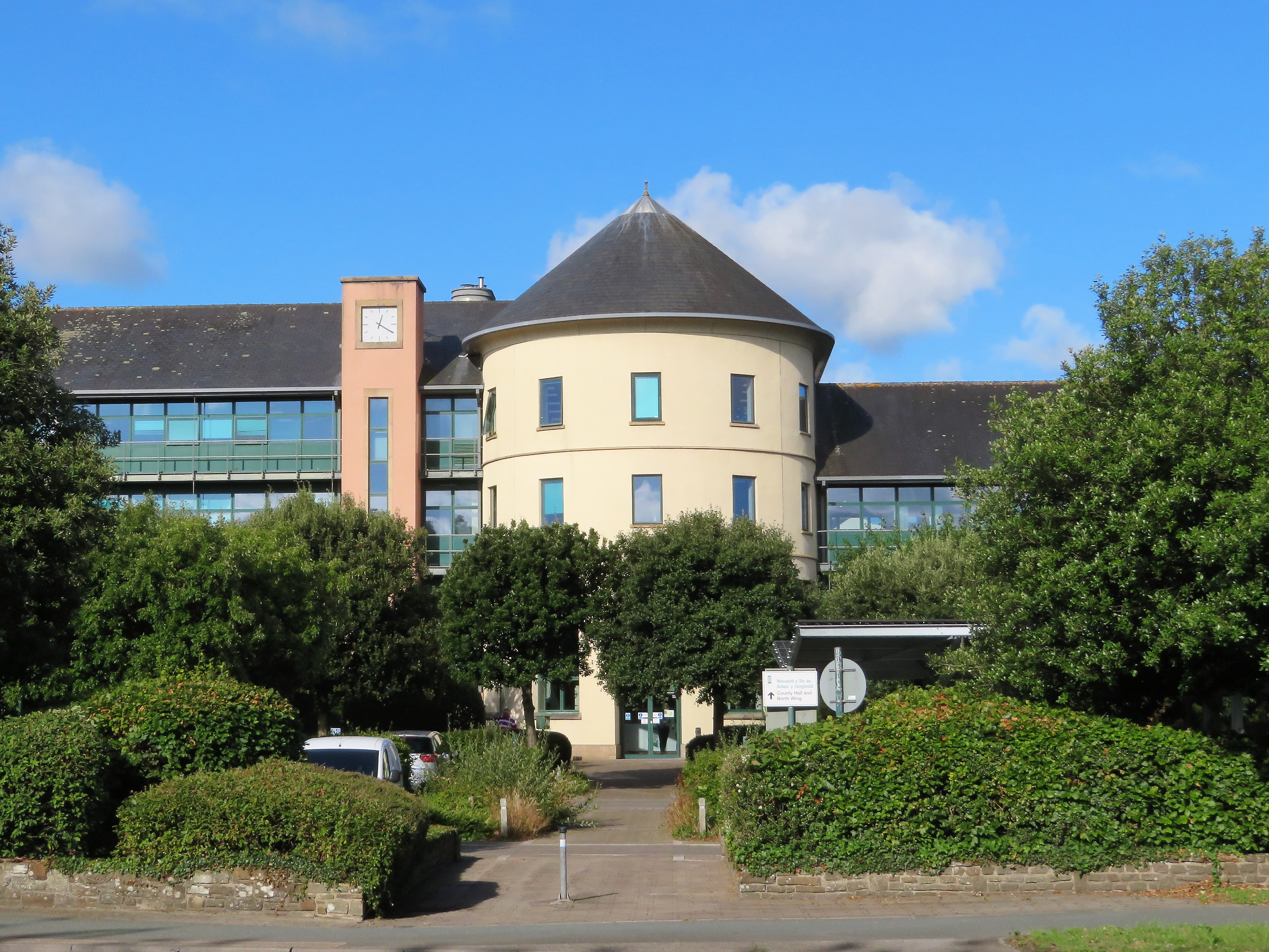
East elevation with main entrance facing Freemens Way.

It was decided shortly after the new council's creation to build a new headquarters adjoining Cambria House. The project was overseen by the county architect, Tim Colquhoun. The new building was sited on the banks of the Western Cleddau, and straddles a tributary of the river. A river walkway along the eastern bank of the river was created within the new County Hall site, linking New Bridge to the north with the public open space to the south. The building is arranged with four large bastion towers evenly spaced along its length, with the main reception and council chamber incorporated into the rounded space inside the towers. A smaller rectangular clock tower projects from the front (east) elevation facing Freemens Way.

The first full council meeting in the new building was held in October 1999. Cambria House was demolished the following year and its site was incorporated into the landscaping and car park in front of County Hall. The council's other offices at Llanion Park in Pembroke Dock subsequently became the headquarters of the Pembrokeshire Coast National Park Authority, whilst the old County Offices building in Haverfordwest was demolished to make way for a leisure centre.

The new County Hall was formally opened by Queen Elizabeth II on 22 November 2001. The building was reported to have cost £10 million.
