= Haverfordwest Castle =

Castle in Wales

- Part of Pembrokeshire
- Haverfordwest, Wales; UK grid reference SM953157
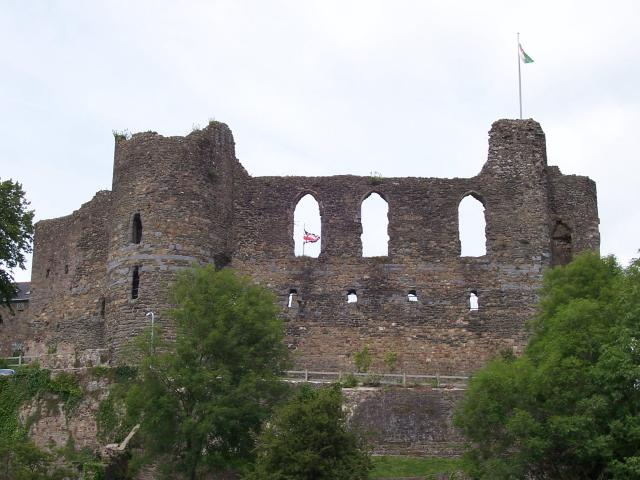

Site information
- Type: Castle
- Controlled by: Pembrokeshire County Council
- Open to the public: Yes
- Condition: Partially restored

Location
- Location in Pembrokeshire, Wales
- Location within Pembrokeshire
- Coordinates: 51.803°N 4.97°W

Site history
- Built: 1120; 1290; Early 1380s
- Built by: Gilbert de Clare, earl of Pembroke; Queen Eleanor of Castile
- In use: Until mid 18th century
- Materials: Mortar; Timber

Haverfordwest Castle (Welsh: Castell Hwlffordd) is a castle located in the town centre at Haverfordwest, Pembrokeshire, south Wales, in a naturally defensive position at the end of a strong, isolated ridge. The castle was established during Norman times in 1120 but much of the architecture remaining today dates from 1290. For centuries the castle was an English stronghold. There are several other notable castles in the area: Wiston Castle lies 6 miles (10 km) to the northeast and Pembroke Castle lies 12 miles (19 km) to the south.

== History ==
=== Iron Age hill fort ===
Pembrokeshire records indicate that there was an Iron Age hill fort on the site of the castle, although there is no physical evidence to suggest this at the present location. Haverfordwest is believed to have been a Danish settlement prior to the Norman conquest of West Wales in 1093–94. The Flemish settled in the area in 1108 to protect the main Norman stronghold at Pembroke Castle from Welsh raiders from the north.

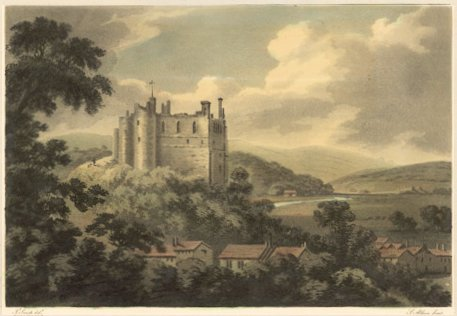
Haverfordwest Castle, painted in 1794

=== Construction of the Norman fortress ===
The vast majority of sources indicate that the structure was originally a Norman stone keep and bailey fortress, founded by the Englishman Gilbert de Clare, Marcher Earl of Pembroke in 1120. While this date is generally consistent, some indicate 1110 or 1113, Pembrokeshire records insist that the castle was actually originally built by Tancred the Fleming, husband of Gwladus (the aunt of Gerald of Wales), so the original medieval town and castle would have been Flemish not Norman. In any case, Gilbert de Clare appointed Tancred's son, Richard fitz-Tancred, as castellan.

=== Visit by Henry II ===
The original castle is believed to have been first attacked (unsuccessfully) by Gruffydd ap Rhys, Prince of Deheubarth, in 1135–36. In 1173 the castle had its first royal visit by Henry II of England, who passed by the town on coming back from a trip to Ireland. In 1188 Gerald of Wales mentions visiting the castle with Archbishop Baldwin during his progress around Wales preaching for the Third Crusade that Richard I of England the Lion Heart led to the Holy Land.

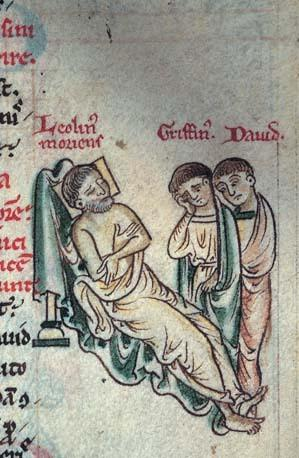
A 13th-century depiction of Llywelyn the Great (left) who threatened the castle and burned the town of Haverfordwest in 1220, but failed to capture the castle.

=== Garrisoned by William Marshal ===
By 1200, many of the original timber buildings had been replaced with the first stone buildings, including a rectangular north eastern tower to serve as the castle's keep. At the same time, Robert fitz-Richard, son of Richard fitz-Tancred, had established Haverfordwest Priory, to which he retired in 1210. That year, King John passed Haverford in order to sail to Ireland, so as to crush a rebellion by the Normans there. In 1213 the King persuaded William Marshal, who had inherited the surrounding Marcher Earldom of Pembroke (in jure uxoris), to garrison the castle in return for an exorbitant sum of money; William Marshal was already extremely wealthy.

William Marshal was responsible for replacing most of the original timber walls, towers and gatehouse with stone in the 1210s, and already by 1220 little remained of the original castle. Today all that remains of the 1120 establishment is a large square keep in the north-east corner of the inner ward. This mass reconstruction to strengthen the castle was likely due to the persistent attacks during this period.

In 1217, Llywelyn Fawr (Llywelyn the Great), Prince of Wales threatened William Marshal, and in 1220 he burned the town but failed to take the castle. The town was rebuilt greater than before, and developed quickly in the 13th century as a commercial centre due to its position at the centre of Pembrokeshire and its naval links. In 1248, Humphrey II de Bohun acquired the castle and resisted an attack in 1257 by Llywelyn ap Gruffudd, Prince of Gwynedd (Llywelyn the Last). In 1265, the castle was taken by William de Valence, Earl of Pembroke, during the Second Barons' War, but in 1274 royalty intervened and granted it back to the de Bohun family, to the next generation, Humphrey III de Bohun.

=== Owned and reconstructed by Eleanor of Castile ===
In 1284 King Edward I and Queen Eleanor of Castile visited the castle for the first time during a royal pilgrimage to St Davids. Eleanor was said to be in love with the castle. Four years later she borrowed a huge amount of money in those times to purchase the castle from the de Bohun family, and loaned the large sum of £407 to fully rebuild the castle and complete its transition into stone. There was a massive scale reconstruction; this was completed a year later in 1290, shortly before she died, although it was long known as the "Queen's Castle at Haverford". Today much of what remains is dated to Queen Eleanor's 1290 version, including the extensive curtain wall. The castle remained in royal possession after Eleanor's death, and it was granted out to various wealthy tenants.

=== 14th-century restoration ===
In the 14th century, the castle was occupied by many owners; amongst them was Edward, the Black Prince, from 1359 to 1367. The castle was owned by the Crown from 1381 to 1385, who paid for restoration works of the castle. These works proved important later, as in 1405 the castle was strong enough to fend off an attack during Owain Glyndŵr's War of Welsh independence. The town walls around the high ground near the castle also did much to protect the castle from invaders, although nothing remains of these town walls today. Over the centuries the castle was visited by numerous nobles and monarchs such as King Richard II and Oliver Cromwell.

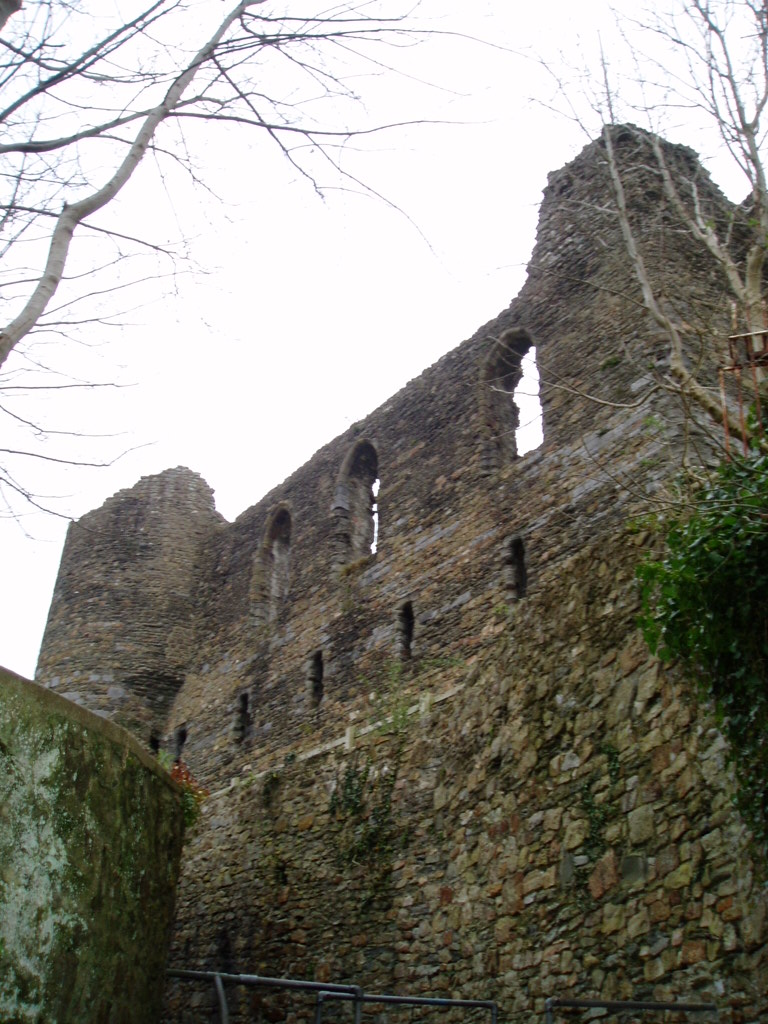
Haverfordwest Castle

Oliver Cromwell who sent letters to the castle in 1648 ordering it to be demolished.

=== Royalist stronghold ===
By the 16th century, however, the castle had become dilapidated and subsequently was re-fortified during the English Civil War. In 1644 Haverfordwest Castle is documented as being occupied by the Royalists, but they abandoned it on misinterpreting the noises of cows for a Parliamentary army. It was recaptured and held for the king for a year, who finally surrendered after the Battle of Colby Moor nearby. Oliver Cromwell sent letters to the castle, ordering it to be destroyed in July 1648 and threatened to imprison the townsfolk unless it was demolished. These letters were only unearthed in 1986 and are currently on display in the town museum.

=== Prison ===
The derelict medieval castle was converted to a prison in 1779, although Gerald of Wales records that part of the castle was used as a prison as early as 1188.

In 1820 a new prison building was erected within the castle grounds, mainly within the inner bailey. It had a capacity for 86 prisoners. In 1878 the remaining inmates were transferred to the gaol in Carmarthen. The building has subsequently been used as a police station and council offices. Today it houses the town museum. A cell door, leg irons, the original lock from the castle gate and numerous artifacts are on display. Today the castle is operated by the Pembrokeshire Coast National Park Authority and is open to the public.

In 2010 there were plans to put the prison building on the market, with new council offices being built in the Prendergast area of Haverfordwest.

In January 2008 an extensive archaeological excavation was conducted at Haverfordwest Castle.

== Architecture ==
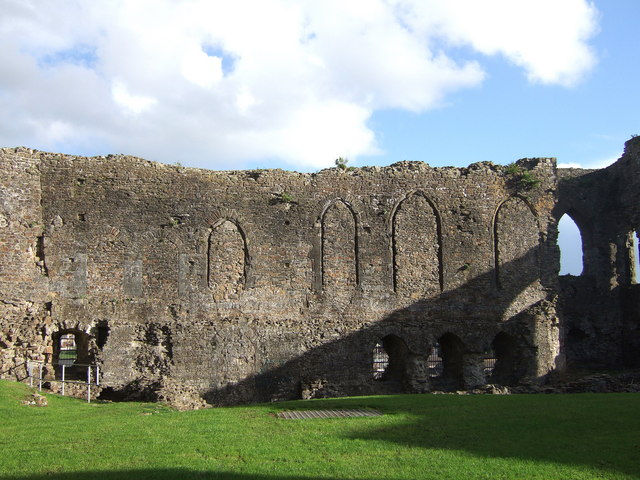
The curtain wall

The original entrance to the castle lay on the west side, guarded by a gatehouse; but no trace of this survives. There are round towers at the north-west and south-west corners, and at the south-east corner there is a square tower with an additional projecting turret. The south-west and south-east towers have three storeys, with the south-east tower possessing a basement and postern gate which could be used in a counter-attack during a siege. A large hall lies in the south of the castle with great, high windows and scaling ladders. Little remains of the original medieval defences in the outer ward of the castle, although the extensive curtain wall has been maintained and still remains, along with a considerable part of the north side, including a semicircular turret and a square tower to the east.
