= Haverfordwest power station =

Former power station

- Country: Wales
- Location: Haverfordwest
- Coordinates: 51°47′46″N 04°58′29″W
- Status: Decommissioned
- Commission date: 1931
- Decommission date: Late 1960s
- Owners: West Cambrian Power Company Limited (1931–1948); British Electricity Authority (1948–1955); Central Electricity Authority (1955–1957); Central Electricity Generating Board (1958–1970)
- Operator: As owner

Thermal power station
- Primary fuel: Fuel oil

Power generation
- Units operational: Eight diesel engines
- Make and model: see text
- Nameplate capacity: 8 MW
- Annual net output: 13.83 GWh (1954)

Haverfordwest power station supplied electricity to the town of Haverfordwest, Wales and the surrounding area from 1931 to the late 1960s. It was initially owned and operated by the West Cambrian Power Company Limited, then by the British Electricity Authority following nationalisation in 1948. It comprised diesel engines driving electricity alternators.

== History ==
Haverfordwest power station was commissioned in 1931 and further generating plant was added up to 1954. The power station was owned and operated by the West Cambrian Power Company Limited which also owned the power stations at Lampeter, Llandysul and St. Clears. The British electricity supply industry was nationalised in 1948, and the power company was abolished and ownership of Haverfordwest power station was vested in the British Electricity Authority. The power station was decommissioned in the late 1960s.

== Plant ==
The station finally comprised eight diesel engines driving alternators. The engines were by the following manufacturers:

- 3 × Fraser & Chalmers
- 2 × Atlas
- 1 × BPE
- 2 × Crosley

Six of the alternators were by GEC and two were Brush, the range of generating capacities were:

- 2 × 1.2 MW
- 2 × 1 MW
- 1 × 1.05 MW
- 1 × 0.575 MW
- 2 × 1.2 MW

All the alternators generated current at 11 kV.

== Operations ==
Operating data for the period 1946–67 was:

Haverfordwest power station operating data, 1946–67
Year	Running hours or load factor (per cent)	Max output capacity kW	Electricity supplied MWh	Thermal efficiency per cent
1946	(32.5 %)	4,120	4558	28.38
1954	5249	6,025	13,832	43.7
1955	3546	8,465	9,891	33.0
1956	1271	8,465	5,557	51.6
1957	784	8,465	3,128	47.11
1958	671	8,465	3,060	53.9
1961	(10.6 %)	8,000	7,399	27.52
1962	(3.8 %)	8,000	2,659	32.16
1963	(10.59 %)	7,000	7,423	31.00
1967	(28.2 %)	7,000	17,290	30.94

== See also ==
- Timeline of the UK electricity supply industry
- List of power stations in Wales
