= Haverfordwest Priory =

Priory in Pembrokeshire, Wales

Coordinates: 51.7981°N 4.9644°W

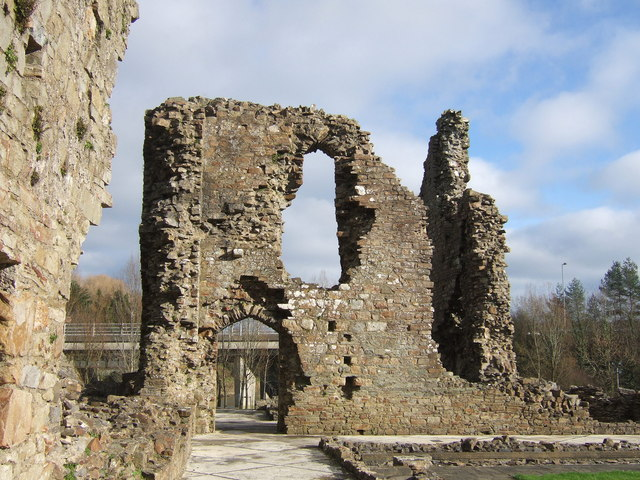
Haverfordwest Priory in 2007

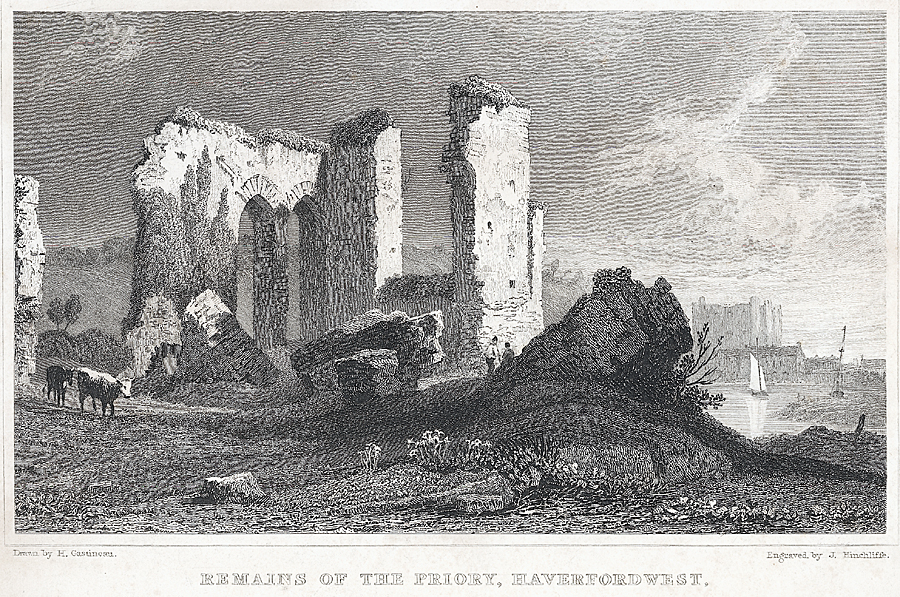
Remains of the Priory, Haverfordwest, Pembrokeshire by Gastineau, Henry G, ca. 1830

Haverfordwest Priory (Welsh: Priordy Hwlffordd) was a house of Augustinian Canons Regular on the banks of the Western Cleddau at Haverfordwest, Pembrokeshire, Wales.

== History ==
=== Pre-construction ===
The priory was founded c.1200. Prior to its construction, Robert FitzTancred, the castellan of Haverford Castle and grandson of Tancred (the Flemish builder of Haverfordwest Castle) donated the lands on which the abbey would be constructed, although this is conflicted with mentions of a similar Robert fitz-Richard, castellan of Haverford Castle (second cousin of Gerald of Wales). The abbey was dedicated to St. Mary and St. Thomas the Martyr.

=== Construction ===
To create a flat site on which to build the prior was achieved by cutting away at the steep bank and depositing the excavated material into and on top of the marsh area beneath the priory. The consequential effect of this poor foundation was to create a structure that was always going to be slowly subsiding. In addition, the steep bank that remained, giving way to the consistently higher ground behind it, ensured that rainwater continually drained, and still does, into and around the Priory.

=== Operation ===
According to William Latham Bevan, “It owned the three churches in Haverfordwest, Haroldston St. Issell's, adjacent to it, Llanstadwell, Dale, Lambston, Camrose, Llanwynio, St. Ishmael's (Milford Haven), Reynalton, and a chapel now extinct named Cristiswell, probably situated at Cresswell Quay, near Cresselly.

=== Dissolution ===
At the time of Henry VIII’s Dissolution of the Monasteries (1536–1541), it was acquired by Roger and Thomas Barlow, brothers of William Barlow, bishop of St David's who had himself had been granted the lands personally by Anne Boleyn for his efforts in securing Henry VIII's divorce from Catherine of Aragon.

Much of the site was robbed of its stone after the dissolution and the main ruin is what remains of the Priory church.

=== Excavation efforts ===
From 1983 to 1996, the site (now under control of Cadw) was excavated and the outlines of the buildings are visible. Much architectural material of a high standard was discovered and can be seen in Haverfordwest museum. Also unearthed was a unique medieval garden with raised beds. The gardens are listed at Grade I on the Cadw/ICOMOS Register of Parks and Gardens of Special Historic Interest in Wales.

In February 2022, archaeologists began to excavate Haverfordwest Priory, and a gravesite containing 240 burials at the location of a former department store was identified.

== Features ==
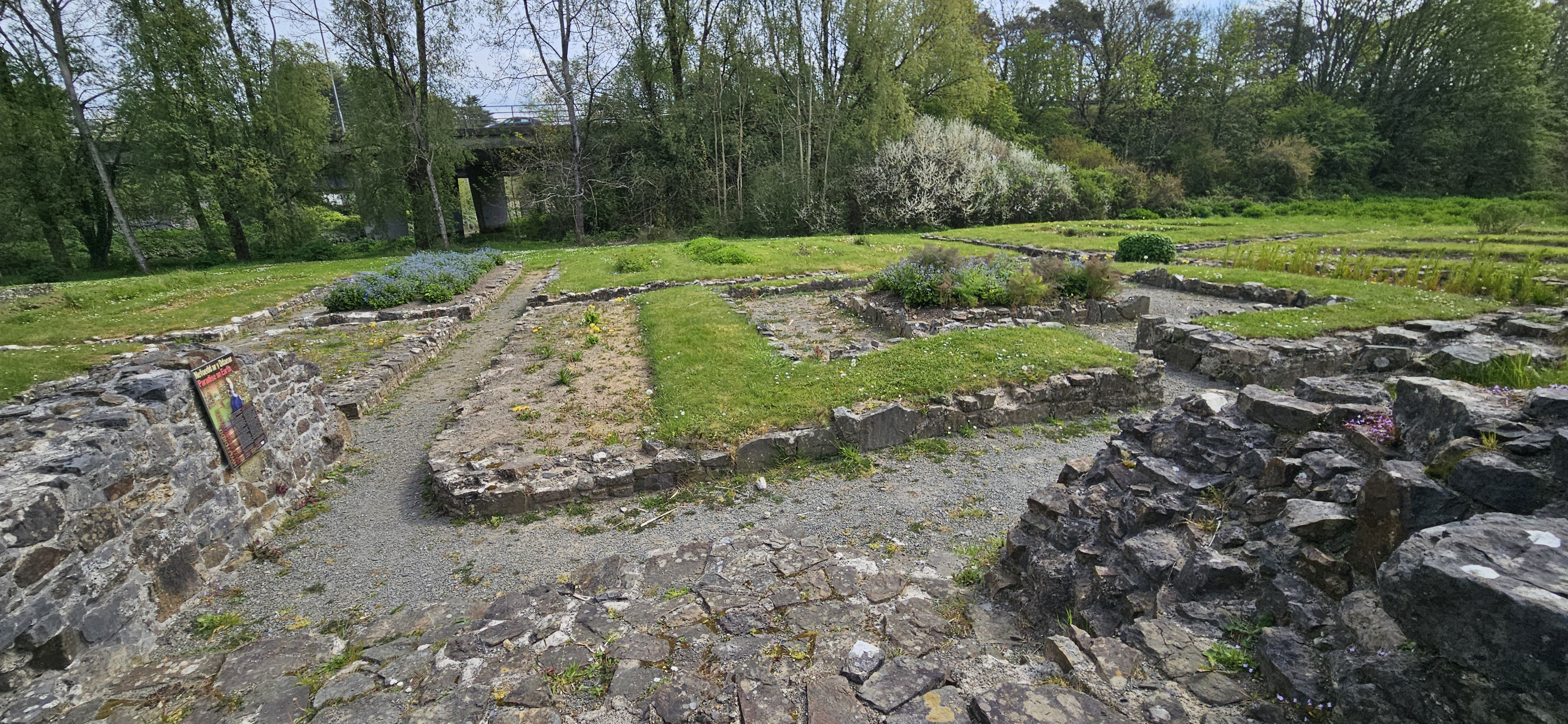
The original monastic garden of Haverfordwest Priory, taken in 2026.

The original herb garden is the only surviving monastic garden in this country and has since been renovated and planted with examples of plants used at the time.

== Gallery ==
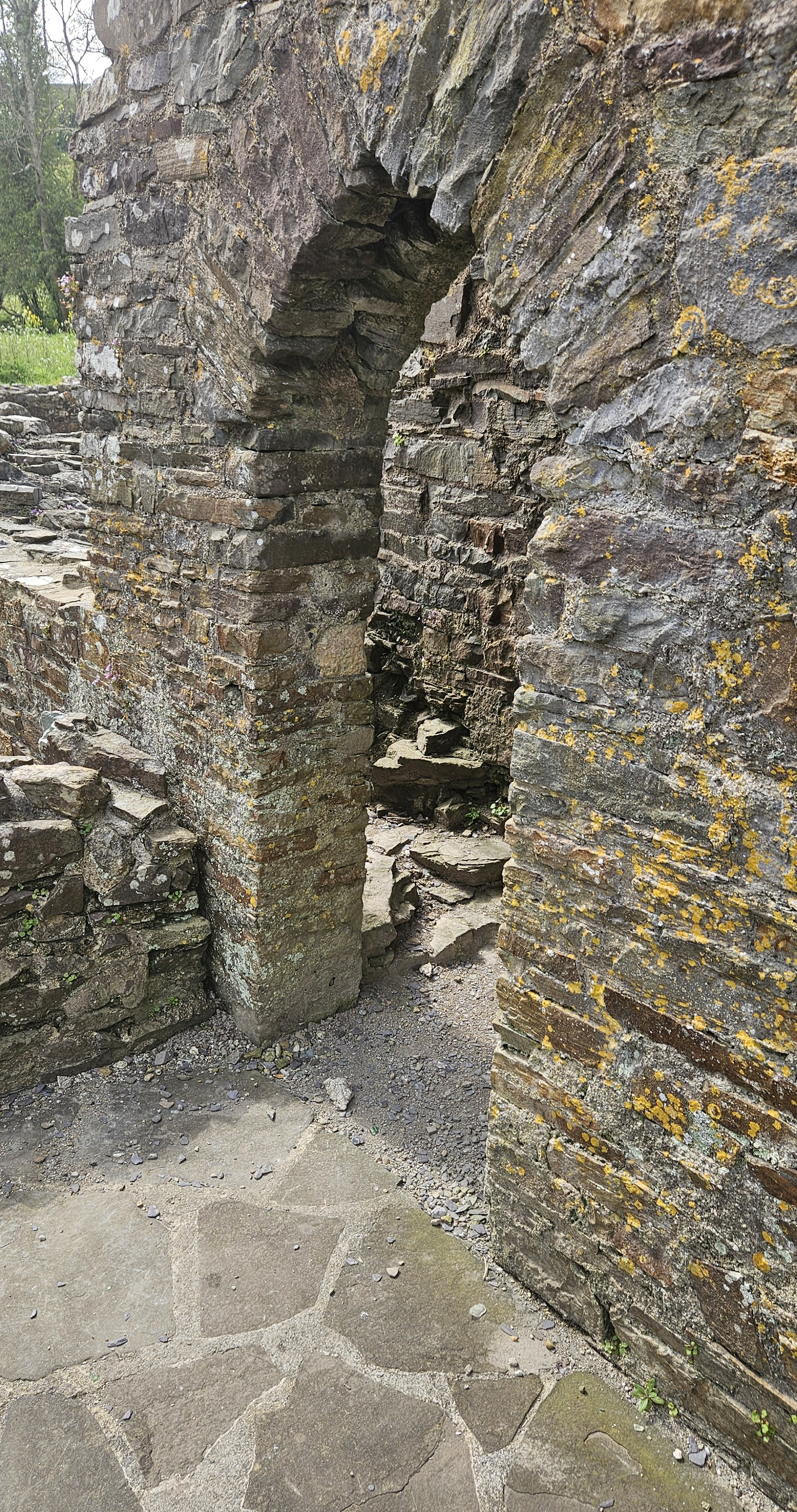
Passage to priory stairway

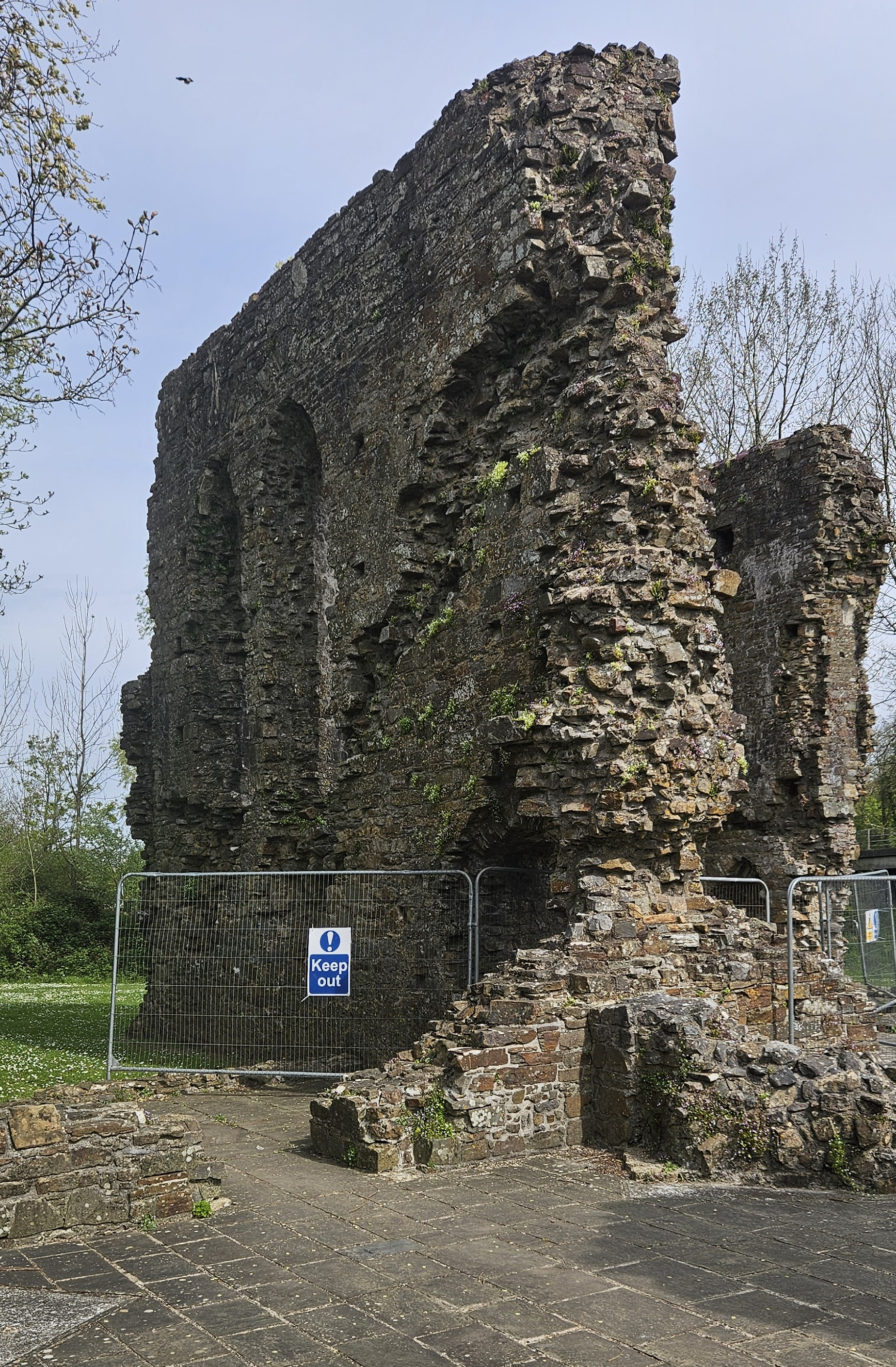
Wall of Haverfordwest Priory

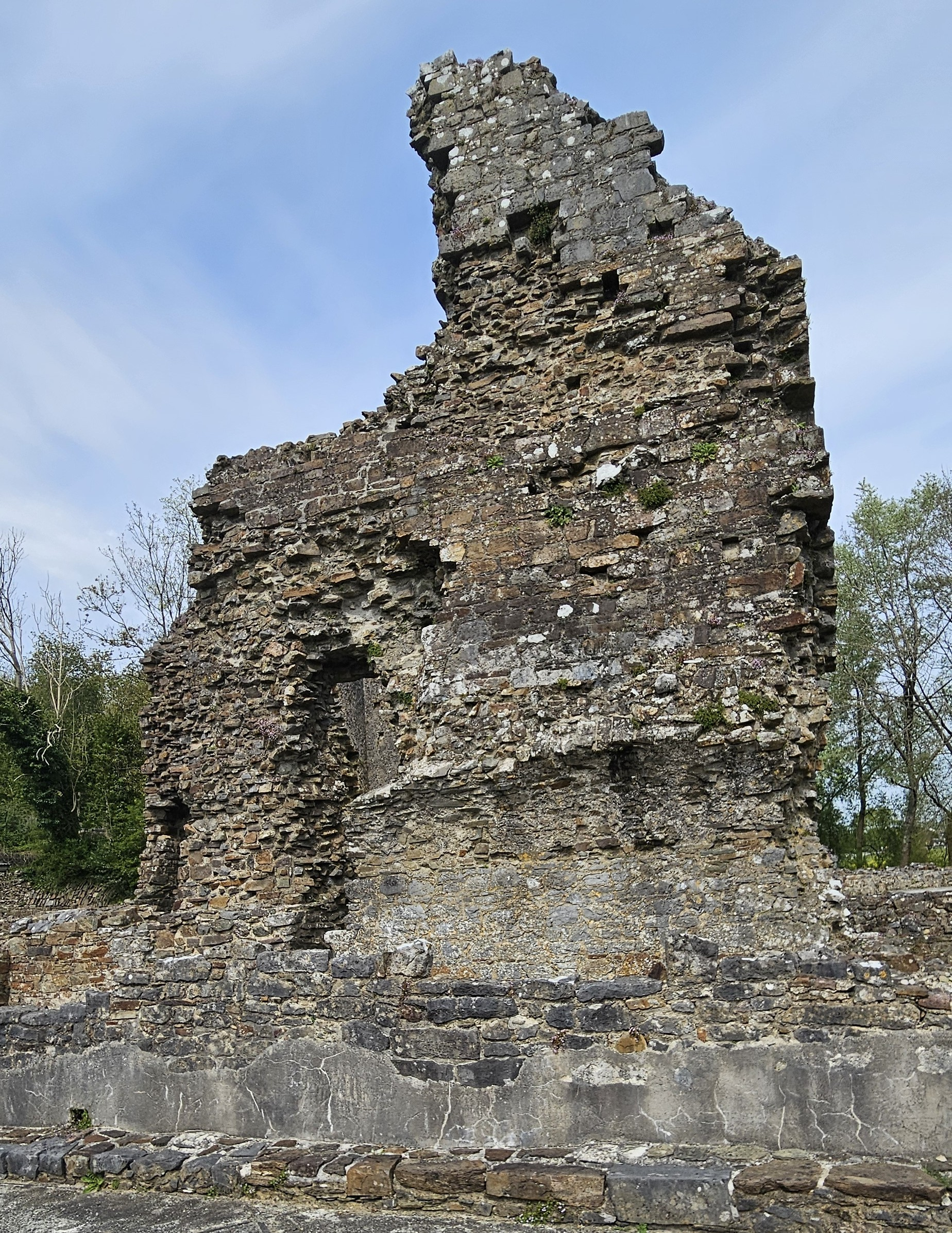
Wall of Haverfordwest Priory

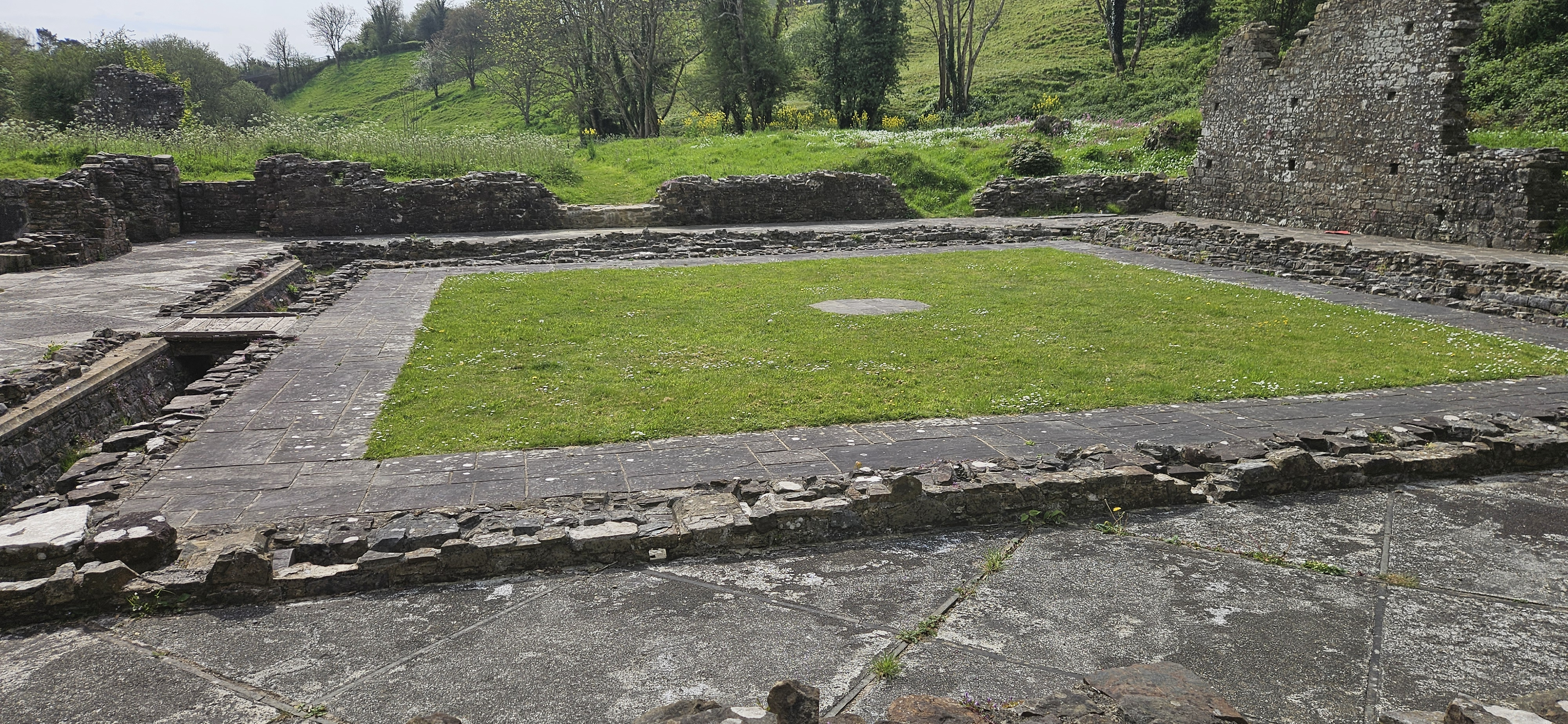
Square within Haverfordwest Priory
