= Pembroke Rural District =

History of Pembrokeshire

Coordinates: 51.67437°N 4.91067°W

- Rural district
- Population
  - 1901: 8,859
  - 1971: 6,150
- History
  - Created: 28 December 1894
  - Abolished: 31 March 1974
  - Succeeded by: South Pembrokeshire
  - HQ: Pembroke
- Contained within
  - County Council: Pembrokeshire

Pembroke Rural District was a rural district in the administrative county of Pembrokeshire, Wales from 1894 to 1974, covering an area in the south of the county. It surrounded, but did not include, the town of Pembroke after which it was named.

== Origins ==
The district had its origins in the Pembroke Poor Law Union, which had been created in 1837, covering Pembroke itself and a large surrounding rural area. A workhouse to serve the union was built on the north side of Pembroke in 1838. In 1872 sanitary districts were established, giving public health and local government responsibilities for to the existing boards of guardians for the rural parts of their poor law unions that were not already covered by an urban authority. The Pembroke Rural Sanitary District therefore covered the area of the poor law union except for the towns of Pembroke and Tenby, which were both municipal boroughs.

Under the Local Government Act 1894, rural sanitary districts became rural districts from 28 December 1894.

The town of Neyland was removed from Pembroke Rural District in 1900 to become its own urban district. In 1934 the parishes of Burton, Llanstadwell and Rosemarket (being the remaining parts of the district north of the Daugleddau estuary) were transferred from Pembroke Rural District to the neighbouring Haverfordwest Rural District.

== Premises ==
The council was based in the town of Pembroke. By 1957 it had its main offices at Tudor House at 115 Main Street in Pembroke.

== Abolition ==
Pembroke Rural District was abolished under the Local Government Act 1972, merging with other nearby districts to become South Pembrokeshire.
