= Haverfordwest =

Town in Pembrokeshire, Wales

Haverfordwest: Welsh: Hwlffordd
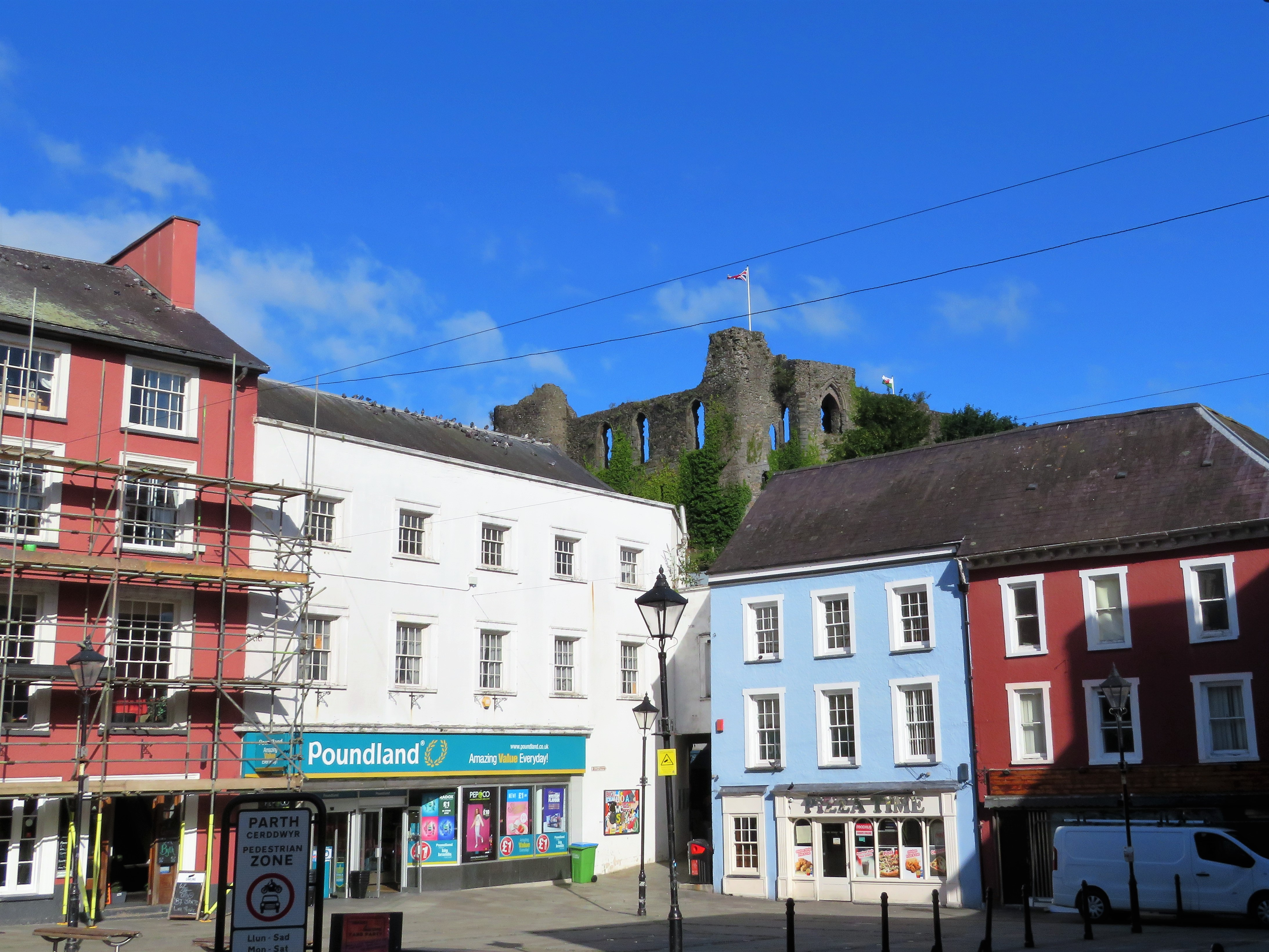
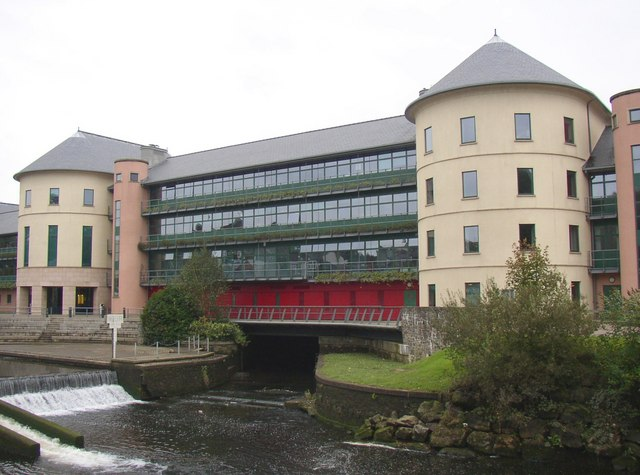
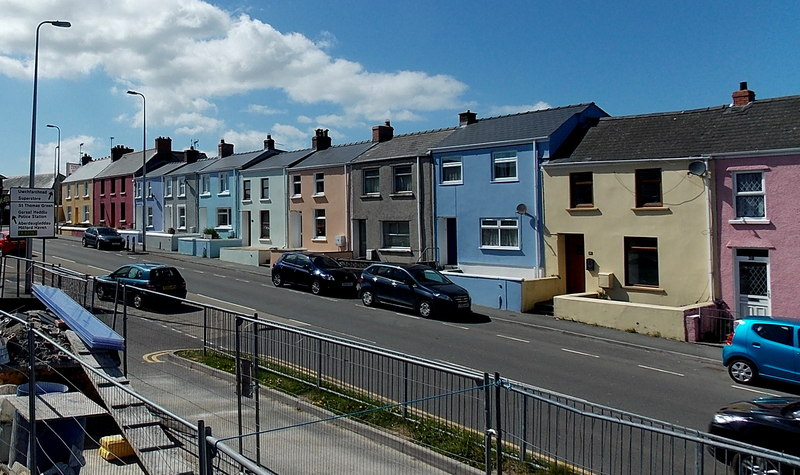
- From the top, Haverfordwest Castle seen from Castle Square, County Hall, Milford Road

- Location within Pembrokeshire
- Population: 12,042 (Community 2011)
- OS grid reference: SM955155
- Community: Haverfordwest
- Principal area: Pembrokeshire
- Preserved county: Dyfed
- Country: Wales
- Sovereign state: United Kingdom
- Post town: HAVERFORDWEST
- Postcode district: SA61, SA62
- Dialling code: 01437
- Police: Dyfed-Powys
- Fire: Mid and West Wales
- Ambulance: Welsh
- UK Parliament: Mid and South Pembrokeshire
- Senedd Cymru – Welsh Parliament: Ceredigion Penfro
- List of places UK Wales Pembrokeshire 51.80°N 4.97°W Map of the community

The town centre, showing parish churches

Haverfordwest (/ˌhævərfərdˈwɛst/ HAV-ər-fərd-WEST, locally /ˈhɑːrfərdwɛst/ HAR-fərd-west; Welsh: Hwlffordd [ˈhʊlfɔrð]) is the county town of Pembrokeshire, Wales, and the most populous urban area in Pembrokeshire with a population of 14,596 in 2011. It is also a community consisting of 12,042 people, making it the second most populous community in the county after Milford Haven. The suburbs include the former parish of Prendergast, Albert Town and the residential and industrial areas of Withybush (housing, retail parks, hospital, airport and showground).

Haverfordwest has a strategic location: it is the lowest bridging point of the Western Cleddau.

== Topography ==
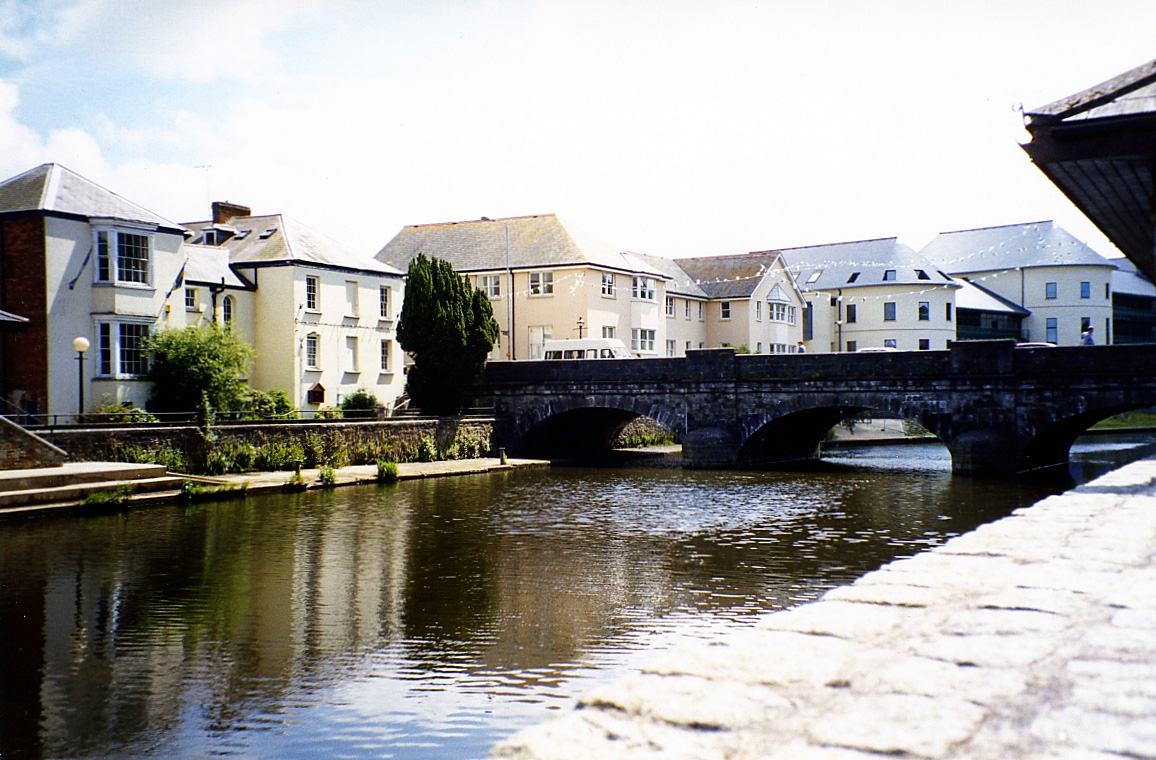
The "New" Bridge

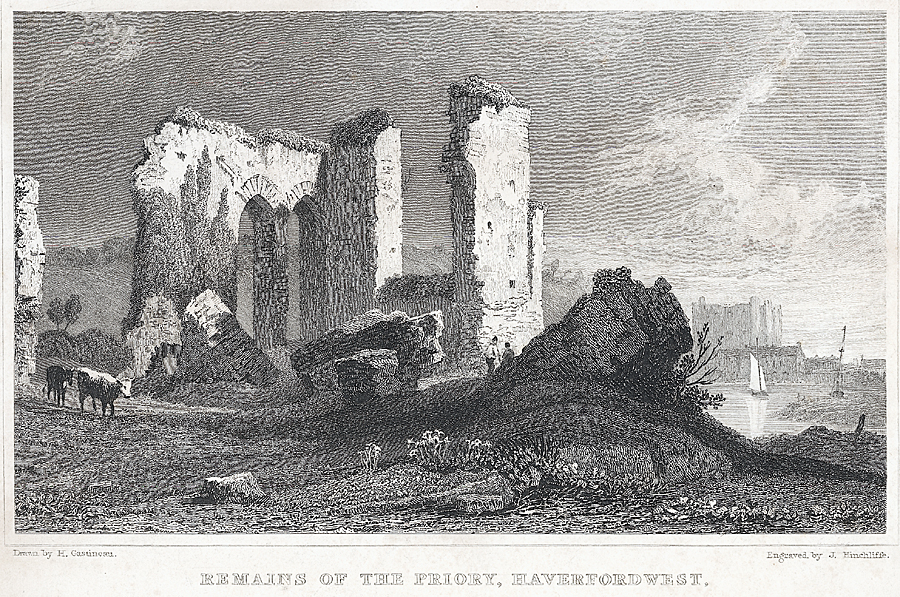
The Priory, Haverfordwest Henry G Gastineau, 1830

Haverfordwest is a market town, the county town of Pembrokeshire and an important road network hub between Milford Haven, Pembroke Dock, Fishguard and St David's as a result of its position at the tidal limit of the Western Cleddau. The majority of the town, comprising the old parishes of St. Mary, St. Martin and St. Thomas, lies on the right (west) bank of the river. On the left bank are the suburbs of Prendergast and Cartlett. At this point, a pair of sandstone ridges extending from east to west and separated by a deep, narrow valley, are cut through by the Western Cleddau. This leaves two high spurs on the west side of the river. On the northern spur, the castle and its surrounding settlement form the core of St Martin's parish. On the southern spur, the High Street ascends steeply from the river and forms the core of St Mary's parish. From the foot of each spur, ancient bridges cross the river to Prendergast: St Martin's Bridge ("the Old Bridge") and St Mary's Bridge ("the New Bridge", built in 1835). St Thomas's parish occupies the south side of the southern spur. From these core areas, the town has spread, mainly along the ridges. In addition to the four ancient parish churches, the remains of an Augustinian priory are visible at the southern edge of the town.

== Toponymy ==
The name of the town means "ford used by goats", from Old English hæfer ford. In local dialect, it is pronounced "Harford". "West" was added in the 15th century, to distinguish the town from Hereford. It is marked as Herfordwest on a 1578 parish map of Pembrokeshire. The Welsh name is said by B. G. Charles to be "merely a corruption of the English name".

== History ==
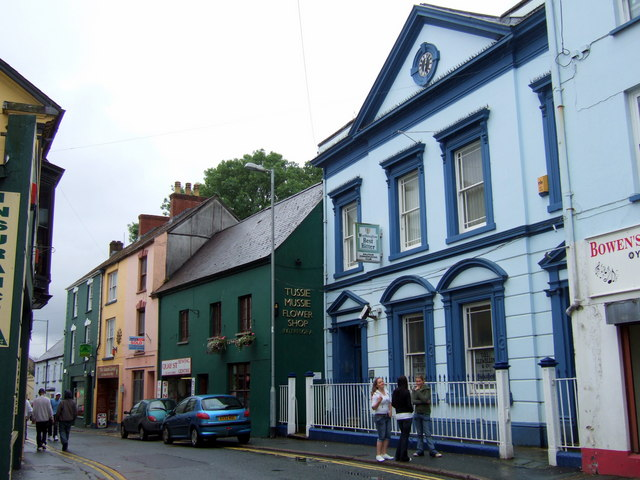
Quay Street

Haverfordwest has been English-speaking for many centuries. South Pembrokeshire is known as 'Little England Beyond Wales', but because the markets traded with Welsh farmers in the north and east, there has always been a significant Welsh-speaking influence. The suburb of Prendergast seems to have originated as an extramural Welsh dormitory, dating from the times when all agricultural trade had to pass through the borough, and the fearful Normans before the destruction of Anglo-Norman power in 1136 tried to prevent Welshmen bearing arms from entering within the castle walls after nightfall.

=== Origins ===
Scores of Iron Age and Roman coinage and artefact discoveries, and excavations by the Dyfed Archaeological Trust under the direction of Heather James at Carmarthen (Moridunum) in the 1980s, point to significant Roman penetration to this westernmost part of Wales. The strategic position of Haverfordwest with its defensive bluff overlooking the lowest fordable point on the western Cleddau and accessible to sea traffic would have required a Roman presence, probably modest in scale, from the 1st century AD to protect supplies to and from the coast, e.g. the Roman legionary headquarters at Caerleon were roofed with slates from the lower slopes of the Preseli Hills. In 1992, aerial photography identified a Roman road running to the west of Carmarthen, past Wiston to Poyston Cross, raising the possibility of Roman fortlets at strategic river crossings at Whitland and Haverfordwest. Edward Llwyd's note to Camden's Britannia (ed. 1695) refers to a valuable find of silver coins at Llanboidy, the latest coin being one of Domitian struck in AD 91. In the 1920s Sir Mortimer Wheeler partially excavated a Roman dwelling or villa at Wolfscastle; work was restarted in 2002 by Professor Merroney. James Phillips, in The History of Pembrokeshire (published 1909), records a find of Roman silver coins in Haverfordwest, the earliest dated coin a Valerian and the latest a Claudius Gothicus. The museum in which the coins were deposited has been "scattered to the winds" and the whereabouts of the coins is unknown.

Phillips claimed that the pre-Norman name of Haverfordwest was Caer Alun, so named by the Emperor Maximus (Macsim Gwledig). His sources are not given but the Cambro-Briton in 1822 also recorded that Maximus, the last Roman Emperor of Britain, a man who for a time divided the Roman Empire with Theodosius I, on withdrawing Roman legions from Britain granted civic status and Celtic names to a number of pacified Romano-British settlements, including Southampton, Chichester, Old Sarum near Salisbury, Carmarthen (Caerfyrddin) and Haverfordwest (Caer Alun). Maximus had married Elen, a Welsh noblewoman, and they had three sons. Phillips claims that the name actually given to the town was Caer Elen, in honour of his wife (the name later changing to Caer Alun).

=== Medieval period ===
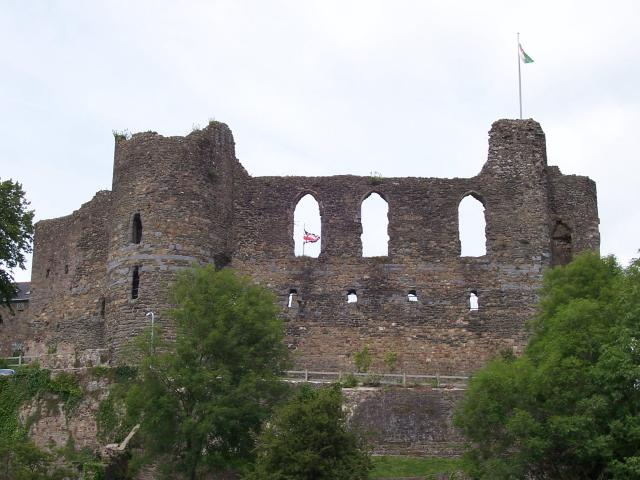
Haverfordwest Castle

The ecclesiastical centre of the area (perhaps the seat of a bishop in the Age of the Saints) was probably one of the several churches of the local St Ismael, most probably St. Ishmael's. This occurred around 1110.

The proposition that Haverfordwest Castle was founded by Tancred, a Flemish Marcher Lord, is questionable. The castle is recorded as having been founded in 1100 by the Norman Gilbert de Clare. The Flemings, said to have arrived in three groups in 1107, 1111 and 1151, are likely to have participated in its later development for their own and the Normans' protection from the Welsh warlords. It is recorded that the Constable of the castle in 1207 was Itohert, son of Richard Tancard, possibly a descendant of the first Tancred.

The Flemish presence, reputed to result from floods in the Low Countries, was more likely to have consisted initially of Flemish mercenaries originally in the invading army of William the Conqueror, who in reward for their part in William's victory were granted lands in parts of Northern Britain, and in Wales in the Gower, and Geraldus Cambrensis recorded their presence in the Hundred of Roose in Pembrokeshire.

A Fleming, Wizo, who died in 1130 founded at Wiston a motte and bailey fortification, the forerunner of the stone castle, for protection against the Welsh warlords: the Flemings were reportedly unpopular wherever they settled. The precarious position of Normans and Flemings was demonstrated in 1136 when the Normans, having already lost 500 men in battle at Loughor, re-recruited from Lordships from all over South Wales and led by Robert fitz Martin at Crug Mawr near Cardigan attacked Owain Gwynedd and his army. Routed, they fled over the Teifi Bridge which collapsed; the retreating Normans drowning under the weight of their armour. Their leader Richard de Clare had previously been intercepted and killed by Iorwerth ab Owen. Wiston and the castle were overrun in 1147 by Hywel Sais, son of Lord Rhys. Ranulf Higden, in his Polychronicus, records the Flemings as extinct in Pembrokeshire by 1327 but Flemish mercenaries reappear in 1400 when at the behest of Henry IV they joined an army of 1,500 English settlers who marched north from Pembrokeshire to attack the army of Owain Glyndŵr at Mynydd Hyddgen. The attack was repulsed with heavy casualties and legend has it that English prisoners were spared but surviving Flemish mercenaries were massacred or sold into slavery.

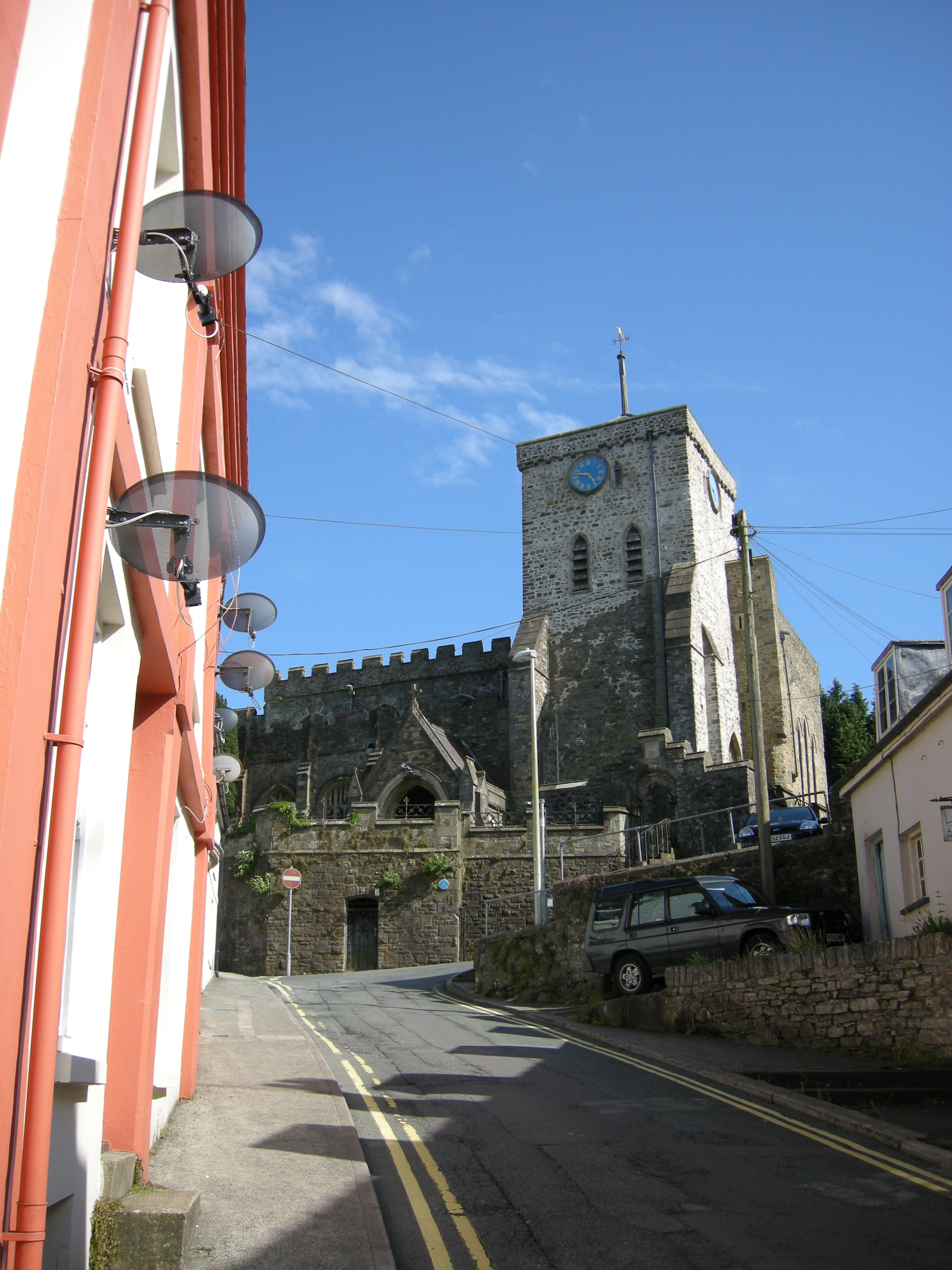
St Mary's Church, viewed from Tower Hill

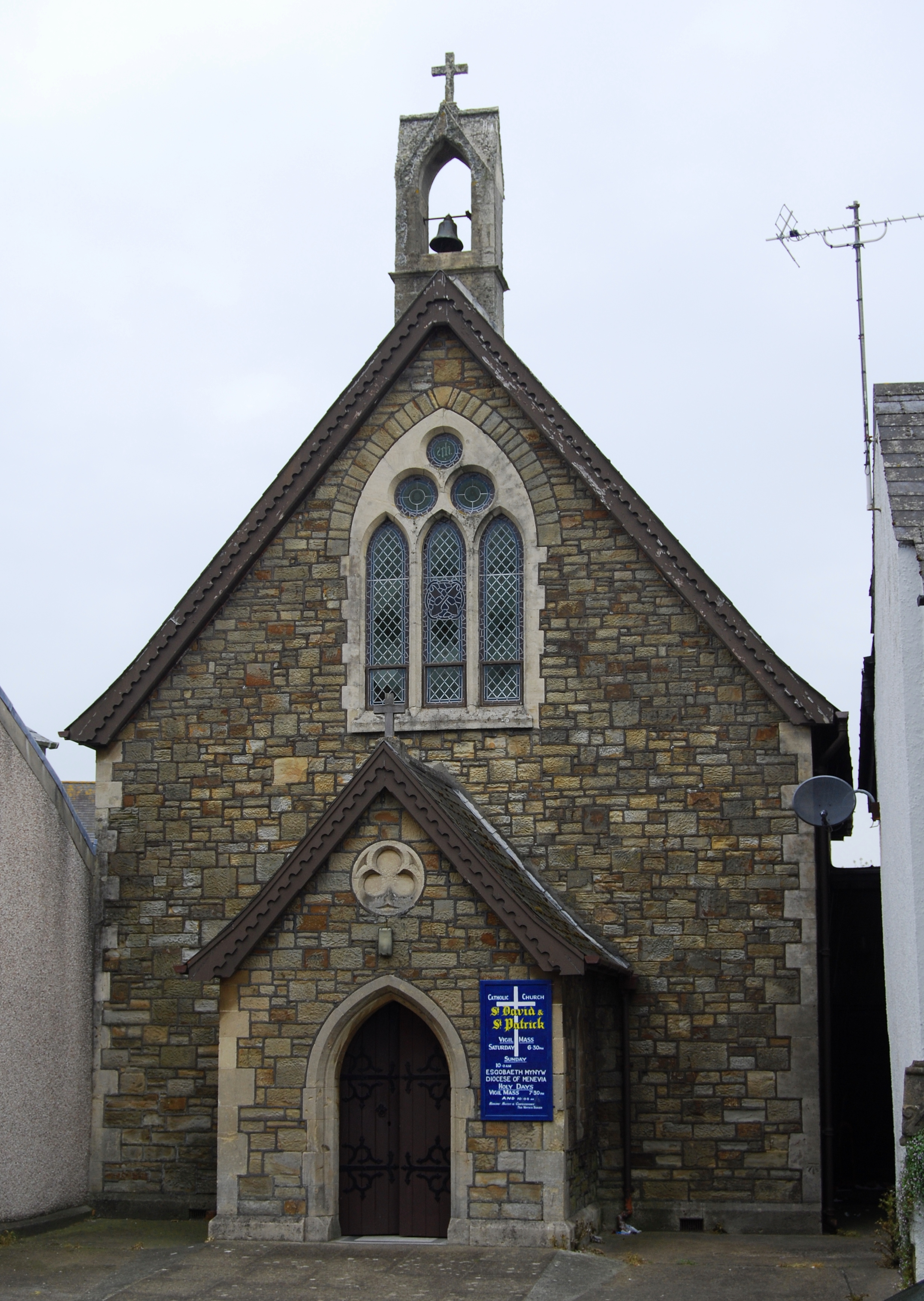
St David & St Patrick Roman Catholic Church, Dew Street

St Mary's Church originated at the end of the 12th century and the current (Grade I listed) building was constructed between the 13th and 15th centuries and prominently visible at the top of the High Street.

Haverfordwest rapidly grew, initially around the castle and St Martin's Church (the settlement being called Castletown), then spreading into the High Street area. It immediately became the capital of the hundred of Roose (part of Little England beyond Wales), and because of its pivotal position, the commercial centre of western Dyfed, which it has remained to this day. In common with other British towns, its growth was rapid during the period up to 1300, and its extent by then was much the same as it was in the early 19th century. A large town by the standards of the time, its population was probably around 4,000–5,000. It received its first marcher charter from William Marshall, 1st Earl of Pembroke sometime between 1213 and 1219, and obtained the lucrative trading privileges of an English borough. It traded both by land and sea and had a busy tidal quay on the river below the "New" Bridge. At least ten guilds operated, and there was significant woollen cloth manufacture. In 1545, the town was designated a county corporate by Henry VIII, with the aim of supporting a campaign against piracy in local waters. It was one of only two such counties corporate in Wales (the other being Carmarthen), and remained officially "The Town and County of Haverfordwest" until the abolition of the borough in 1974.

In common with other large towns in Europe, Haverfordwest was hit hard by the Black Death in 1348, suffering both depopulation (perhaps by more than 50%) and diminution of trade. Large parts of the town were abandoned, and it did not start to recover until the Tudor period. At the end of the 17th century, the town was still significantly smaller than in 1300. In 1405, the town was burned by the French allies of Owain Glyndwr, although in its early history Haverfordwest suffered less than most towns in Wales from such depredations.

=== Post-medieval ===
During the English Civil War, the burgesses of the borough supported Parliament, while the ruling gentry were Royalist. As a result, there was considerable conflict, and the town changed hands five times. There followed a period of stagnation in which the comparative status of the town declined.

=== 20th century ===
Some 1,200 men of Pembrokeshire lost their lives in World War I, and Haverfordwest was the location chosen for the County of Pembroke War Memorial, unveiled in 1921. Its current location is Picton Place, close by County Hall, and it is Grade II listed. Haverfordwest was bombed for the first time during World War II on 24 September 1940. The City Road and New Road areas were hit, although there had been little preparation and no warning siren sounded. There were no casualties.

Haverfordwest today has the air of a typical small country market town, but the centre still conveys the feel of the important mediaeval borough. The once run-down riverside area has been renovated and Bridge Street has been pedestrianised and improved.

Haverford Township, Haverford and Havertown in Pennsylvania, United States, are all named after Haverfordwest.

=== 21st century ===
In October 2022, the remains of 307 people, including children, were unearthed by archaeologists working on the remnants of a medieval priory found beneath the old Ocky White building, a former department store which closed in 2013. It is believed that the graveyard could have been used until the early 18th century.

== Governance ==
=== Local government ===
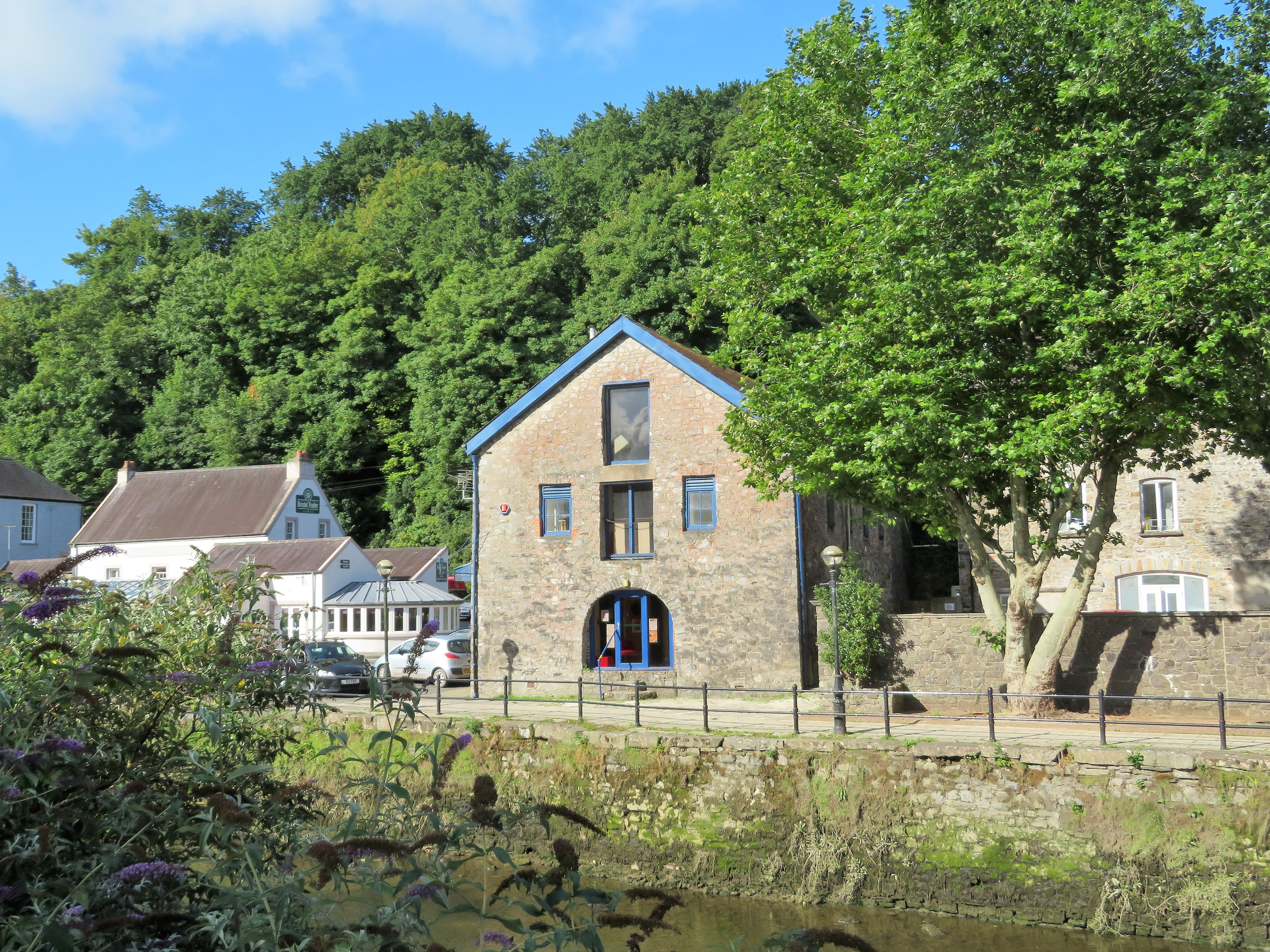
Old Wool Market, Quay Street: Town council offices.

There are two tiers of local government covering Haverfordwest, at community (town) and county level: Haverfordwest Town Council and Pembrokeshire County Council. The town council is based at the Old Wool Market on Quay Street. Pembrokeshire County Council is also based in Haverfordwest, at County Hall on Freemens Way.

For local government purposes the community of Haverfordwest comprises five wards: Castle, Prendergast, Portfield, Priory and Garth. The community has its own town council and mayor.

Pembrokeshire County Council conducted an extensive review of community boundaries in 2007 which made a number of submissions to the boundary commission for Wales. These submissions included a number of recommendations for the extension of the Haverfordwest community boundary where there had been perceived community overspill due to housing developments. These suggestions were mostly implemented, with one significant exception leading to an increase in the number of electors in the Haverfordwest community. One area of contention concerned the status of the village of Merlin's Bridge which continues to have its own community council despite its close proximity to Haverfordwest and a degree of community overspill. As such the conurbation of Haverfordwest and Merlin's Bridge is the most populous urban area in Pembrokeshire though Haverfordwest's community boundaries mean it is only the second most populous community in the county after Milford Haven.

Haverfordwest is twinned with Oberkirch, Germany.

=== Senedd and Westminster representation ===
Haverfordwest is part of the Preseli Pembrokeshire Senedd constituency, where the local Senedd Member is Paul Davies of the Conservative Party.

In the UK Parliament, Haverfordwest is part of the Mid and South Pembrokeshire constituency, currently represented by Henry Tufnell of Welsh Labour. Prior to the 2024 general election, Haverfordwest had been part of the Preseli Pembrokeshire constituency since 1997, represented by Stephen Crabb, a Welsh Conservative and Chair of the Welsh Affairs Select Committee, since 2005.

Historically, a constituency of Haverfordwest made the town one of very few places within Wales allowed to act as a borough constituency and elect a member to the English Parliament from the sixteenth century. In the nineteenth century, the constituency was expanded by the Reform Act 1832 to include nearby Fishguard and Narberth before being abolished and replaced by the Pembroke & Haverfordwest constituency as part of the Redistribution of Seats Act 1885.

=== Administrative history ===
Haverfordwest was an ancient borough, receiving its first charter from Henry II in 1169. The borough was given the right to appoint its own sheriff in 1479, and in 1545 was declared to be a county corporate. The borough was reformed to become a municipal borough under the Municipal Corporations Act 1835. The borough covered all of the parish of St Mary, parts of the parishes of St Martin, St Thomas, Prendergast, and Uzmaston, and an extra-parochial area (deemed to be a parish from 1866) called Furzy Park and Portfield. Under the Local Government Act 1894, parishes which straddled borough boundaries were split into separate parishes for the parts inside and outside the borough. The part of Uzmaston within the borough therefore became a parish called Cartlett, the part of Prendergast outside the borough became a parish called North Prendergast, and the parts of St Martin and St Thomas parishes outside the borough became parishes called St Martin Hamlet and St Thomas Hamlet respectively. The parishes outside the borough were all included in the Haverfordwest Rural District. The six parishes within the borough after 1894 were therefore Cartlett, Furzy Park and Portfield, Prendergast, St Mary, St Martin, and St Thomas. These were urban parishes and so did not have their own parish councils, with the lowest level representative body being the Haverfordwest Borough Council.

Haverfordwest's status as a county corporate from 1545 made it independent from Pembrokeshire. When elected county councils were established in 1889 the town was brought back into Pembrokeshire for local government purposes, being under the control of Pembrokeshire County Council and losing its separate police force at the same time. For other purposes the town retained its independence from the county, having its own Lord Lieutenant until 1931, and keeping its own Quarter Sessions until 1951. The status of county corporate was finally abolished in 1974 under the Local Government Act 1972. One remaining legacy from Haverfordwest's former status as a county corporate is that it retains the right to appoint its own sheriff.

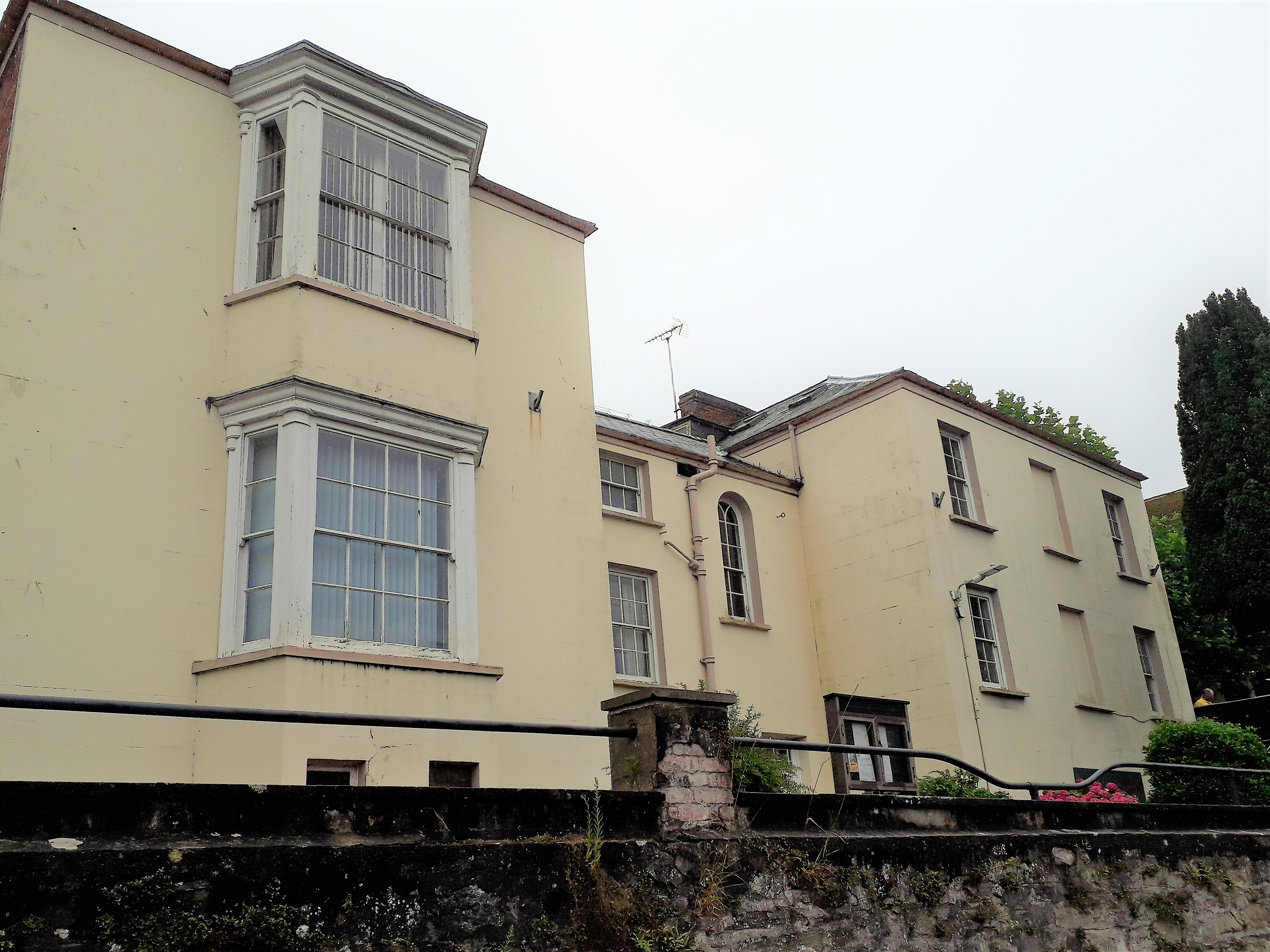
Picton House: Council offices 1954–2020

Haverfordwest had a medieval guildhall which stood at the top (west end) of High Street in front of St Mary's Church. The guildhall served as the meeting place for both the borough corporation and the Pembrokeshire Quarter Sessions until the 1830s. In 1837 the county authorities built themselves Shire Hall at the bottom (east end) of High Street. The guildhall was demolished and the borough corporation met instead in a room above the north porch of St Mary's Church until that room was demolished in 1861. In 1871 the borough acquired newly built premises at 1 St Mary's Lane to serve as the council's offices and meeting place. In 1954 the borough council moved to Picton House at 2 Picton Place, an 1830s house on the bank of the Western Cleddau, and remained based there until the council's abolition in 1974.

Haverfordwest Municipal Borough was abolished in 1974, becoming part of the district of Preseli (renamed Preseli Pembrokeshire in 1987) within the county of Dyfed. A community covering the former borough was established at the same time, with its council taking the name Haverfordwest Town Council. Preseli Pembrokeshire was abolished in 1996 and the area became part of a re-established Pembrokeshire. Haverfordwest Town Council continued to use the former borough council's premises at Picton House as its headquarters until 2020, when it moved to the Old Wool Market, a converted late eighteenth century wool market and warehouse building on the quayside.

== Demography ==
The 2011 census recorded a population of 12,042 living within the community boundary. The urban area extends beyond the community boundary in various places, notably at Merlin's Bridge to the south of the town, which forms a separate community but is deemed by the Office for National Statistics to form part of the Haverfordwest built-up area. The population of the Haverfordwest built-up area was 14,596 in 2011.

== Economy ==
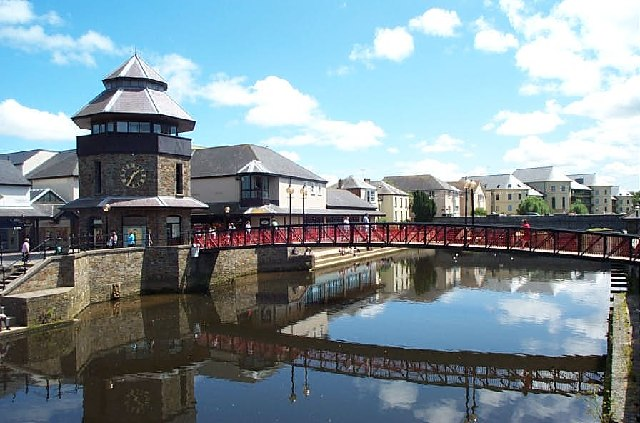
Footbridge on the River Cleddau gives access to shops on both sides

In accordance with its status as a sub-regional hub-town, Haverfordwest continues to serve as Pembrokeshire's principal commercial and retail centre. The development of the riverside shopping centre in Withybush on the outskirts of the town includes Marks & Spencer in 2010 and Debenhams in 2013.

A new town library opened in 2018 in the former Riverside Market building.

A new transport interchange & multi-storey car park opened in September 2026 at the site of a former multi-storey car park on Cartlett Rd.

== Education ==
Schools and colleges in Haverfordwest:

- Haverfordwest Grammar School, 1488–1978, became a public school in the 1920s, making it one of only two public schools in Wales at that time. At one time a boarding school, it became a day-only school in the early 1960s.
- Haverfordwest High VC School, an English-medium secondary school, was formed in 2018 by the merger of Sir Thomas Picton School and Tasker Milward School.
- Pembrokeshire College, an affiliated college of the University of Glamorgan, is situated in the Merlin's Bridge suburb of the town. The college serves as the principal centre of further and higher education in Pembrokeshire.
- Ysgol Caer Elen, a Welsh-medium school for pupils aged 3 to 16, opened in 2018, replacing Ysgol Gymraeg Glan Cleddau. The new school cost £28 million to build and has capacity for 315 primary and 600 secondary pupils. The nursery has capacity for 45 children.
- Redhill Preparatory School is an independent school established in 2001, which includes a Montessori learning component for younger pupils.
- Waldo Williams Primary School opened in 2019, combining the former Mt Airey and Haverfordwest Church in Wales VC schools. It is named after the poet Waldo Williams (1904–1971).
- Mary Immaculate Primary School, a Catholic primary school.

== Sport and leisure ==
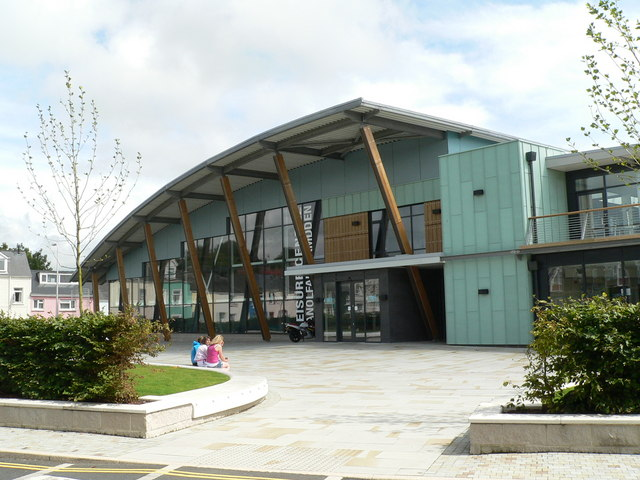
Haverdfordwest Leisure Centre

Haverfordwest County play association football in the Cymru Premier (the top tier of Welsh football) at Bridge Meadow Stadium, while Merlins Bridge play in the local Pembrokeshire League. Haverfordwest RFC, which formed in 1885, play rugby union at their Pembroke Road ground, and Haverfordwest Cricket Club play at Dale Road.

In 2009, Haverfordwest's sports and leisure provision benefited from significant investment, with the opening of a new £8 million leisure centre situated at St. Thomas Green.

The kayaking club venture to sea as well as using the rivers.

Haverfordwest High VC School benefits from a wide range of sporting facilities, including a purpose-built sports centre with a hockey pitch, artificial turf and a full-sized athletics track.

== Health ==
Withybush General Hospital is one of the main hospitals of West Wales and part of the Hywel Dda University Health Board, formerly Pembrokeshire & Derwen NHS Trust. The hospital has most services, but paediatric and maternity services have been moved to Glangwili General Hospital, Carmarthen.

== Transport ==
Haverfordwest is served by Haverfordwest Airport.

Haverfordwest railway station is on the West Wales Line. It is served by Transport for Wales services to Manchester Piccadilly via Cardiff Central or trains run to Milford Haven.

Haverfordwest bus station is located beside Riverside Quay Shopping Centre. It has six bus stops with two additional bays for coach drop off/pickup. It is served by Pembrokeshire County Council, First Cymru, National Express and Richards Brothers.

Forming one of the major "road hubs" of West Wales, the town is at the junction of the A40, A4076 and A487 roads and several rural B roads, including the B4329 running northwards to Eglwyswrw across the Preseli Mountains. The A40 connects Haverfordwest with Carmarthen to the east and Fishguard to the north; the A4076 connects Haverfordwest with Milford Haven and Pembroke Dock to the south; the A487 connects Haverfordwest with St Davids to the northwest.

== Notable people ==
See Category:People from Haverfordwest

- Augustus Anson, (1835–1877), member of the Anson family and recipient of the Victoria Cross, born at Slebech Hall.
- Christian Bale (born 1974), Academy Award-winning actor who played the protagonist in Empire of the Sun and Batman in Christopher Nolan's The Dark Knight Trilogy, was born in Haverfordwest.
- Stephen Crabb (born 1973), politician, MP for Preseli Pembrokeshire (2005-2024); brought up in Haverfordwest.
- Captain Francis Cromie (1882–1918), Royal Navy commander and the first member of the British military to lose his life in Russia after the revolution, attended Haverfordwest Grammar School. A a street in the town and house at the Grammar School were named after him. He was killed while defending the British Embassy in St Petersburg from attacking revolutionaries.
- Geraint Wyn Davies (born 1957), a Welsh-born Canadian actor, spent his early life in the town, where his father was the Congregational Church minister.
- Connie Fisher (born 1983), actress and singer, the winner of the BBC talent show How Do You Solve a Problem Like Maria?, lived in Haverfordwest from the age of six.
- June and Jennifer Gibbons (born 1963), the selective mute twins, whose story gained international interest after Marjorie Wallace documented their story, lived in Haverfordwest for much of their childhood.
- George Herbert Harries (1860–1934), an American businessman, newspaper editor and U.S. Army major general; born in the town.
- Terry Higgins (1945–1982), among the first people known to die of an AIDS-related illness in the UK, lived in Haverfordwest as a child. The Terrence Higgins Trust is named after him.
- Rhys Ifans (born 1967), actor, starred in the 1997 black comedy Twin Town and played Hugh Grant's delusional flatmate in Notting Hill, was born in Haverfordwest
- Elis James (born 1980), stand-up comedian and actor, was born in Haverfordwest and raised in Carmarthen.
- Sir William James, 1st Baronet (1721–1783), born at Bolton Hill Mill, near Haverfordwest; 18th C. naval officer.
- Gwen John (1876–1939), artist, was born in Haverfordwest; her younger brother Augustus John (1878–1961), also an artist, was born in nearby Tenby and lived in Haverfordwest.
- Zoe Lyons (born 1971), comedian, born in Haverfordwest.
- Chelsea Manning (born 1989), American activist and whistleblower, lived in Haverfordwest as a child.
- James Miller (1968–2003), a Welsh cameraman, producer and director; killed by Israel Defense Forces gunfire; born in the town.
- William Owen (1791–1879), local architect, Mayor of Haverfordwest on four occasions and High Sheriff of Pembrokeshire.
- Sir John Perrot (1528–1592), said to be an illegitimate son of Henry VIII, was born in Haverfordwest.
- Greg Pickersgill (born 1951), an influential science fiction fan, was born in Haverfordwest and still lives there.
- The hardcore punk rock band Picture Frame Seduction was formed in the Sir Thomas Picton School in 1978.
- Sir Thomas Picton (1758–1815), a British army general, was born in Haverfordwest and killed at the Battle of Waterloo.
- Juliette Pochin (born 1971), a Welsh classically trained mezzo-soprano singer, born in Haverfordwest
- Gruff Rhys (born 1970), singer of indie rock band Super Furry Animals, was born here.
- John Lort Stokes (1811–1885), an officer in the Royal Navy who travelled on HMS Beagle; born at nearby Scotchwell.
- Graham McPherson (born 1961), aka Suggs, lead singer of Madness, attended Haverfordwest Grammar School for Boys in the early 1970s.
- George Trefgarne, 1st Baron Trefgarne (1894–1960), politician, barrister, businessman and editor of the Daily Dispatch; born in the town.
- Lucy Walter (ca.1630 – 1658), a mistress of Charles II, was born at Roch Castle near Haverfordwest.
- Waldo Williams (1904–1971), Welsh-language poet and pacifist, was born in Haverfordwest.

=== Sport ===
- Henry Baird (1878–1950), cricketer and Army officer; recipient of the Distinguished Service Order for actions in the Second Boer War.
- Simon Davies (born 1979), a footballer who played for Fulham and with 58 caps for Wales, was born in Haverfordwest.
- Dominic Day (born 1985), a Welsh rugby union player with 28 international caps
- Mark Delaney (born 1976), Premier League football coach who played for Cardiff City, Aston Villa and 36 times for Wales, was born in Haverfordwest.
- Simon Halliday (born 1960), an England rugby union international with 23 caps, was born in Haverfordwest.
- Angharad James (born 1994), a footballer with 102 caps for Wales
- Ben Llewellin (born 1994), a Welsh sports shooter, silver medallist at the 2018 Commonwealth Games.
- Peter Morgan (born 1959), a councillor, mayor and rugby player (Llanelli, Wales and British Lions) born locally and went to school in Haverfordwest.

== Freedom of the Town ==
People and military units that have honoured with the Freedom of the Town of Haverfordwest include:

=== Individuals ===
- Vice Admiral Horatio Nelson, 1st Viscount Nelson: 1802
- Admiral Sir Thomas Foley: 1802

=== Military units ===
- HMS Goldcrest: 1964
- 14 Signal Regiment: 4 March 2009

== See also ==
- Haverfordwest power station

== Bibliography ==
- Humphrey Holdfast, Haverfordwest And Its Story, Llewellyn Brigstocke, Publisher, 7 Market Street, Haverfordwest, 1882 (published by subscription).
- Dillwyn Miles (ed) A History of Haverfordwest, Gomer, 1999, ISBN 1-85902-738-5
