= William Owen (architect, born 1791) =

Welsh architect and surveyor (1791–1879)

- Born: 1791 ?Haverfordwest
- Died: 1870 (aged 78–79)
- Occupation: Architect
- Buildings: Pembrokeshire Shire Hall, Haverfordwest.
- Projects: Replanning and rebuilding Haverfordwest from the Cleddau Bridge

William Owen (1791–1879) was a Welsh architect working in Haverfordwest in the late Georgian and early Victorian periods. He built up a considerable practice in Pembrokeshire and Carmarthenshire. He was the county surveyor of Pembrokeshire, four times Mayor of Haverfordwest and High Sheriff of Pembrokeshire in 1859.

== Biography ==
Owen was the son of William Owen (d. 1831), cabinet maker and builder of Haverfordwest. Initially, he worked with his brother James as partners in the family business, while building up his architectural practice. He became county surveyor of Pembrokeshire in 1832. In the same year he promoted a scheme for the improvement of the layout of Haverfordwest for building a carriageway through the town to the Cleddau bridge. He paid for the building the new bridge, which he financed through the collection of tolls. Owen also undertook building work, as at St Ann's Lighthouse at Dale in Pembrokeshire in 1844. This was designed by James Walker for Trinity House.

== List of architectural work ==
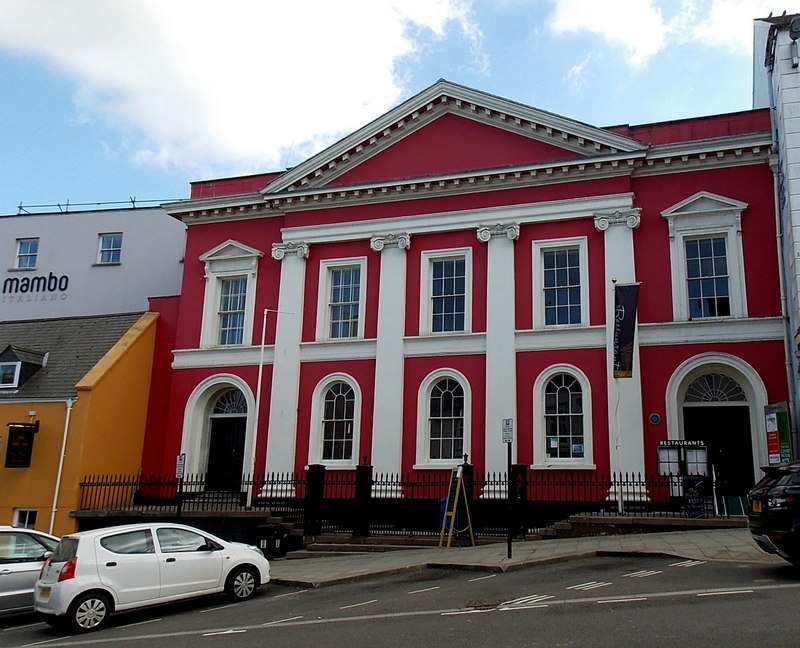
Shire Hall, Haverfordwest

- Capel Heol Awst, Carmarthen, 7 Friars Park, Carmarthen. Grade II* Independent chapel. The exterior is plain with a big, hipped roof. There are two arched windows above two Ionic doorways. The interior is spacious, broad and well-fitted, with a single deep gallery. There are box pews and an unusual pulpit, shaped like a wine-glass with a curved flight of steps.
- Mathry Rectory, Pembrokeshire. 1827–30.
- New Bridge over the Cleddau, Haverfordwest. 1833–36
- Shire Hall, Haverfordwest. 1835-7

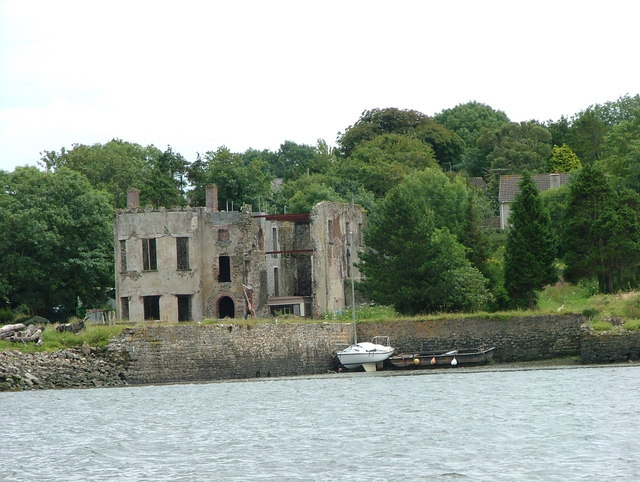
Ruins of the "Big House" at Landshipping

- Big House, Landshipping, Pembrokeshire. The house was originally owned by the Owens of Orielton. In 1837 Owen added a third storey to the western wing and moved the entrance to the north facade, between two bows. These were added to look out over the River Cleddau. His design was inspired by Slebech Hall and Picton Castle. The battlemented parapet is typical of Owen’s work. The house remained occupied until about 1890, by which time it had fallen into disrepair and had become a ruin. The house was purchased for restoration in 2000. The second bay was partially restored by 2012, but since then the restoration has stalled.
- Albany Chapel, Haverfordwest. 1839. This was remodelled by James Owen in 1890.
- Manordeifi rectory, Pembrokeshire 1839. .
- Scolton Manor, Spittal, for James Higgon 1840-2
- Begelly Rectory, Pembrokeshire 1842–4. Now Craig-yr-Eos in Parsonage Lane. Three storeys with hipped roof.
- Corn Market, Haverfordwest. 1847.Converted into a cinema in 1912.

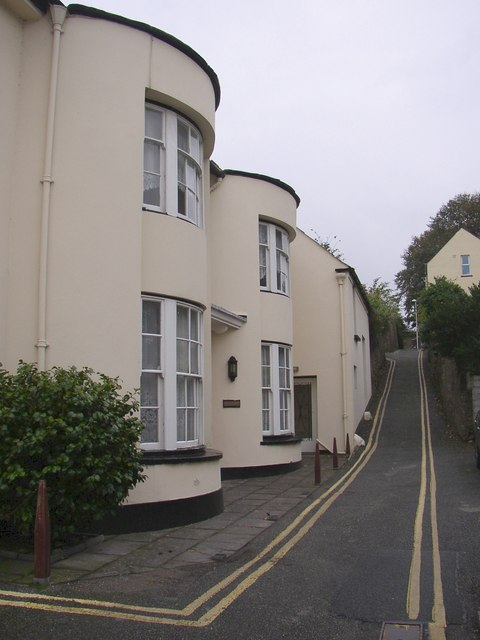
Hill House, Hermon's Hill, Haverfordwest

- Hill House, Hermon’s Hill, off Goat Street, Haverfordwest. Home of William Owen, who extensively remodelled an earlier house. Three bayed range faces the street, with the entrance between two full height bows.
- Hillborough House, Hill Street, Haverfordwest. Five bays with Tuscan porch.
- Avallenau, Merlin's Bridge, Haverfordwest. Villa of 1845–6, four bay front with a two bay central Doric portico.

== Buildings attributed to William Owen ==
- Barn Street, Spring Gardens Haverfordwest (1839). Terrace of seven large, two-storeyed stuccoed houses with battlemented parapets. Built for William Rees, who lived in 8/8a Spring Gardens, with an elaborate cast iron two-storey veranda.
- Castle Terrace Haverfordwest, 1832.
- Narberth Town Hall

== Literature ==
- Colvin H. (2008) A Biographical Dictionary of British Architects 1600–1840. Yale University Press, 4th edition London.
- Lloyd T et al. (2003), "Pembrokeshire: The Buildings of Wales" Yale University Press ISBN 0300101783
- Lloyd T, Orbach J. and Scourfield R.(2006):Carmarthenshire and Ceredigion: The Buildings of Wales, Yale University Press. ISBN 0-300-10179-1.
