= Big House, Landshipping =

Coordinates: 51°46′09″N 4°52′58″W

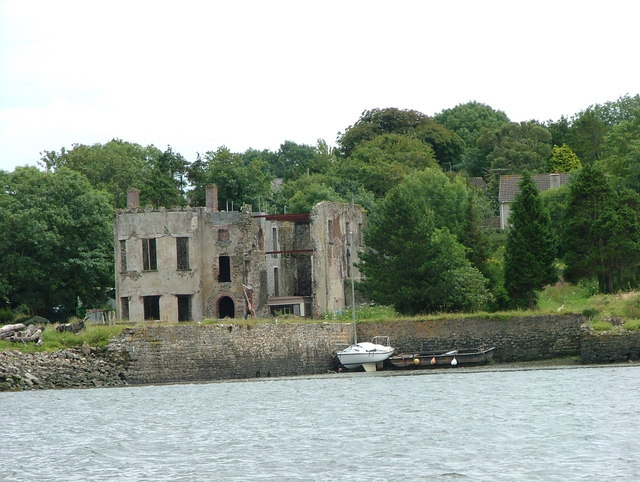
- The property in July 2003
- Interactive map of the Big House, Landshipping area

General information
- Location: United Kingdom
- Construction started: 1750
- Completed: 1830
- Client: William Owens

Technical details
- Structural system: Stone

Design and construction
- Architect: William Owens 1830 (Renovation)

The Big House, also known as Landshipping House, is a historic house on the banks of the River Cleddau in Landshipping, Pembrokeshire, Wales.

The house was originally built in 1750 and owned by the Owens of Orielton who were the Landshipping Coal Agents. It was constructed using stone and roof materials from an older, ruined inland mansion. This building would have been a simple rectangular design with an entrance facing south-west, before several alterations occurred. The final alterations occurred in 1830 by architect William Owen. Owen added a third storey to the western wing and moved the entrance to the North façade, between two bows that were added at the same time to look out over the River Cleddau. His design was inspired by Slebech Hall and Picton Castle. The house remained occupied until the late 1800s when it fell into disrepair and by 1890 it was a ruin. However, the cottages at the rear remained lived in until the 1970s. In 1922 the Landshipping Estate, including Big House, was sold at auction.

A document from 1857 described Big House as having "Bed Rooms, Hall, Parlour, Dining Room, Drawing Room, Nursery, Library, Servants Offices, Range of Stabling, Coach House, Saddle Room & Granary Over Yard, External Walled Garden, Orchards," and a wood set in nearly 6 acres. The property is now set in about 2 acres.

== The Owen family ==
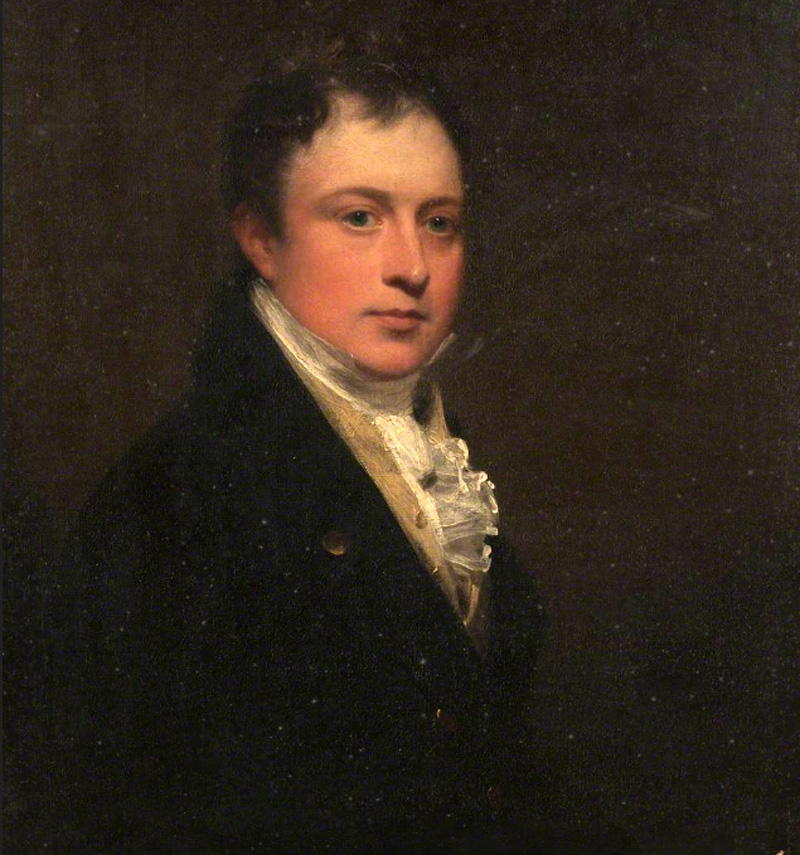
Sir John Owen

The original house was built in about 1750 by the Owen family of Orielton who owned coal mines in the area. A map of 1785 shows the Landshipping Estate. The house is drawn as a dwelling house near the river (red arrow) while the Owens’ much larger residence called “Great House” is to the right of it.

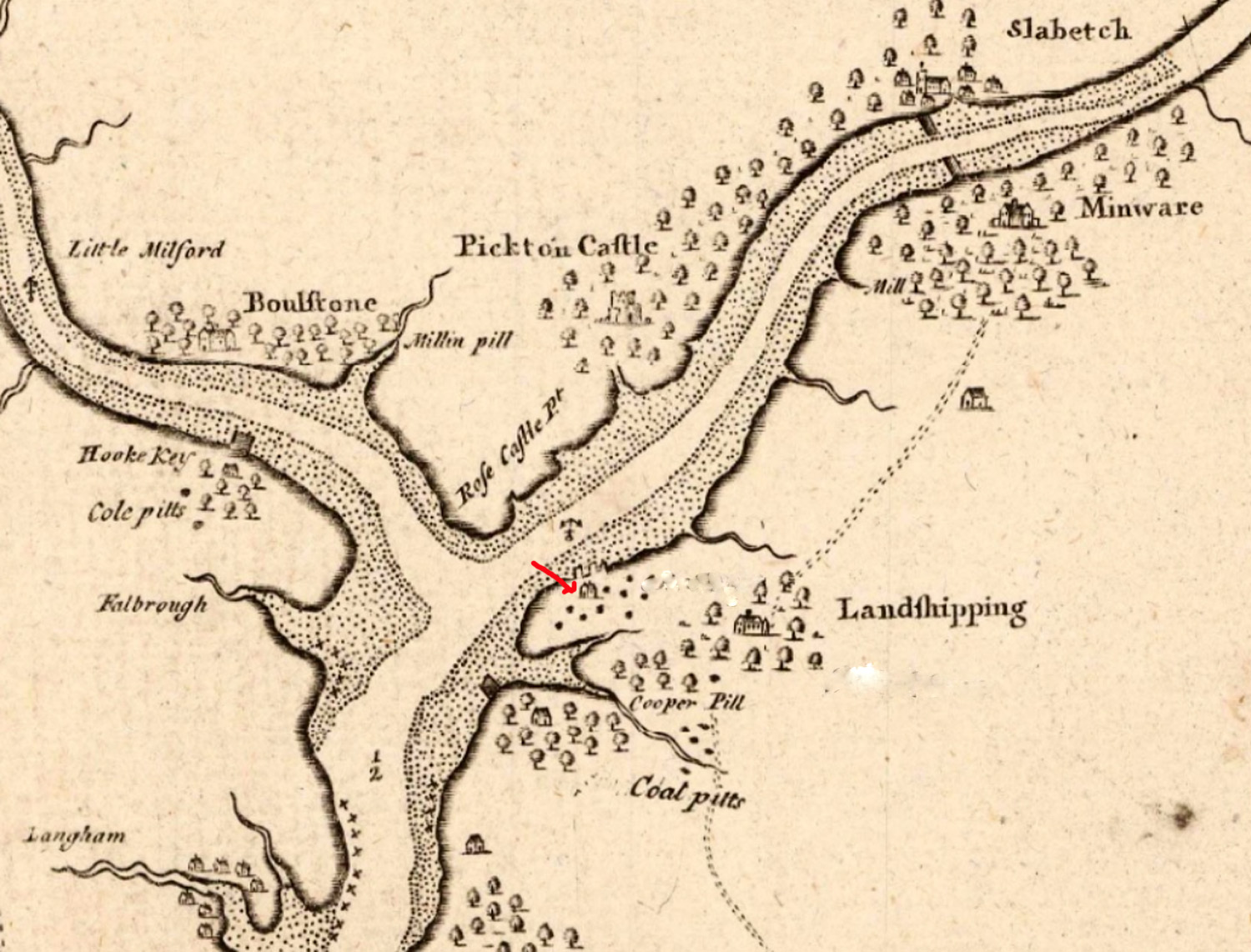
Map of Landshipping (1785)

The Landshipping Estate passed in 1809 to Sir John Owen (1776-1861). He had inherited the property from his cousin Sir Hugh Owen who had died young and unmarried. By this time the Great House which had previously been a splendid mansion was roofless and in ruins. The problem had started long before this when Sir Hugh's mother who for many years was trustee of the Estate found that she did not have or would not provide sufficient funds for the upkeep of the Landshipping house. Therefore, in 1790 she arranged for the main rooms at “Great House” to be closed and the furniture covered in dust sheets. The cook, housekeeper and other domestic servants as well as the gardener and farm labourers were dismissed. One woman, Catherine Davies, was employed to act as custodian of the property.

In 1830 Sir John Owen commissioned an architect to make major alterations and additions to the smaller house near the Quay (red arrow). It is believed that he used the stone from the now crumbling “Great House” to make these changes. A third storey was added to the western wing, and the entrance was moved to the North facade between two bow-fronted full height extensions. A service court with stables and servants’ quarters were added to the rear. These alterations were very similar to the larger Picton Castle on the opposite side of the river.

The altered house became the residence of Sir John's son Hugh Owen (1803-1891) Hugh Owen was born in 1803. In 1825 he married Angelia Maria Cecilia Morgan, the daughter of Sir Charles Morgan of Tredegar House, Newport.

The 1841 Census shows the family living at the “Big House” with two of their children and seven servants. Unfortunately Angelia died in 1844. In 1845, Hugh remarried Henrietta Fraser Rodney, daughter of Captain Edward Rodney. The 1851 Census shows Hugh at Landshipping with his new family.

Although Sir John Owen was the proprietor of many estates, his fortunes declined. He and his son Hugh were both Members of Parliament and needed a great deal of money to retain their seats. In addition there was a disastrous mining accident at Landshipping in 1844 which claimed the lives of 40 people. Consequently, in 1857 they were forced to sell most of their land holdings, including Landshipping. The advertisement for Big House describes it as "Beautifully situated on the banks of the River Cleddy and opposite Picton Castle containing - sundry Bed Rooms, Hall, Parlour, Dining Room, Drawing Room, Nursery, Library, Servants Offices, Range of Stabling, Coach House, Saddle Room & Granary Over Yard, External Walled Garden, Orchards, Wood etc."

Sometime after this sale the Landshipping Estate was bought by the Stanley family.

== The Stanley family ==
The property was purchased and held under the Trust of Sir Edmond Stanley who had died in 1843. The beneficiaries of this Trust were Mary Ann Stanley, Sir Edmonds’ daughter, and her two sons, Edmond and James. At the age of 14, Mary Ann, the only child and heiress of the wealthy Sir Edmond Stanley, ran off with Captain Edward Trant Bontein to Gretna Green where they married. The couple had two sons, Edmond born in 1818 and James Talbot born in 1819. After her husband died in 1820, Mary Ann returned to live with her parents. Her sons were given the name of Stanley and she called herself Mary Ann Bontein Stanley.

The Trust of Sir Edmond Stanley was able to purchase properties and one of these was Landshipping Estate. For a few years in the early 1860s John Talbot Stanley, one of the beneficiaries of the Trust, lived in Big House (then called Landshipping House) and started some mining activities. However, these terminated in 1865 when he encountered serious personal financial difficulties. Shortly after a lease was given by the Trust to John Maule Sutton to conduct mining activities. It is believed that he lived in the house for several years while he undertook excavations. However, in 1867 his firm the Landshipping Colleries Company was wound up due to insolvency.

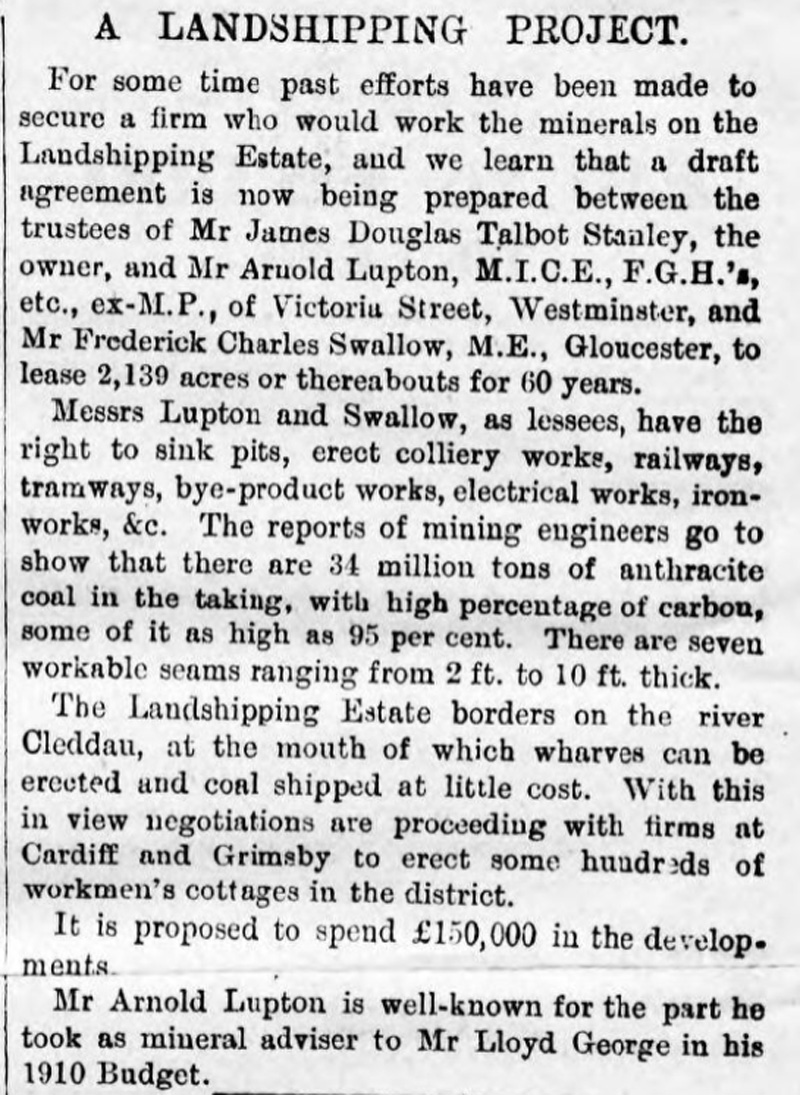
Report of a lease for the Landshipping Estate in 1914

In 1868 Isaac John who was a farmer was reported in a newspaper to be living in the house and in 1878 John Thomas was the resident in the property. However neither of them appear to have stayed there for long.

In 1875 Edmond died and in 1881 Mary Ann died. By 1883 the Landshipping Estate appears to be owned by two grandchildren of Mary Ann, that is, Captain later Major Edward Stanley (1853-1896) and James Douglas Talbot Stanley but is still subject to the control of the Trust. In 1888 a new seam of coal was discovered at Landshipping but little was done to reactivate the mines. In 1896 Major Edward Stanley died and James Douglas Talbot Stanley seems to have become owner of the property. In 1914 he granted a lease for a company to mine but this also did not seem to progress.

James died in 1918 and in 1922 the Estate was divided into lots and sold at auction. By this time Big House was a complete ruin and had not been inhabited for decades.

== Media ==
In 2002 Big House appeared in This Land, a network BBC TV series directed by Richard Traylor-Smith, as Alun Lewis and then partner Sarah Hoss and their children moved to the site to begin the project; then again in 2005 the family were featured with their project in the BBC TV series Magic Harbours presented by Jamie Owen.

In 2011, the project featured on episode six of the BBC television series Restoration Home, presented by Caroline Quentin.

In 2012, the house was again featured in an episode of Restoration Home: One Year On, Episode Three when the second bay was partially restored, but the roof of this wing still needed repairs to make it weatherproof.
