= Pembrokeshire County Council =

Local government of Pembrokeshire, Wales

Pembrokeshire County Council Cyngor Sir Penfro (Welsh)

Type
- Type: Principal council of Pembrokeshire

Leadership
- Chair: Delme Harries, Independent since 15 May 2026
- Leader: Tessa Hodgson, Independent since 15 May 2026
- Chief Executive: Will Bramble since 31 March 2021

Structure
- Seats: 60 councillors
- Graph of the party split among 60 seats.
- Political groups: All parties (60) Conservative (12) Labour (9) Plaid Cymru (3) Liberal Democrats (2) Reform (1) Independent (33)
- Length of term: 5 years

Elections
- Voting system: First-past-the-post
- Last election: 5 May 2022
- Next election: 6 May 2027

Meeting place
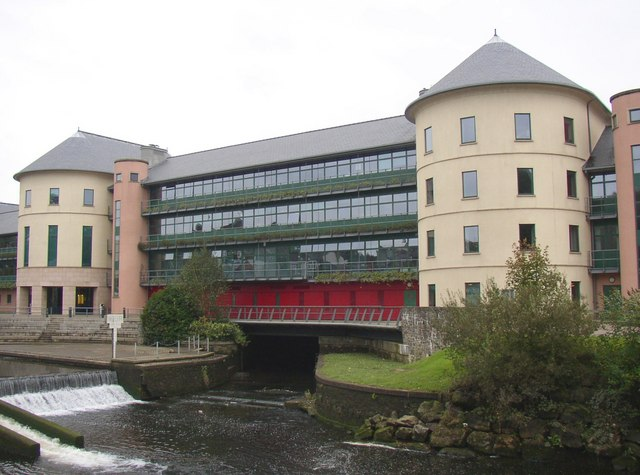
- County Hall, Freemens Way, Haverfordwest, SA61 1TP

Website
- www.pembrokeshire.gov.uk

Pembrokeshire County Council (Welsh: Cyngor Sir Penfro) is the local authority for the county of Pembrokeshire, one of the principal areas of Wales.

== History ==
There have been two bodies called Pembrokeshire County Council. The first existed from 1889 until 1974, and the current one was created in 1996.

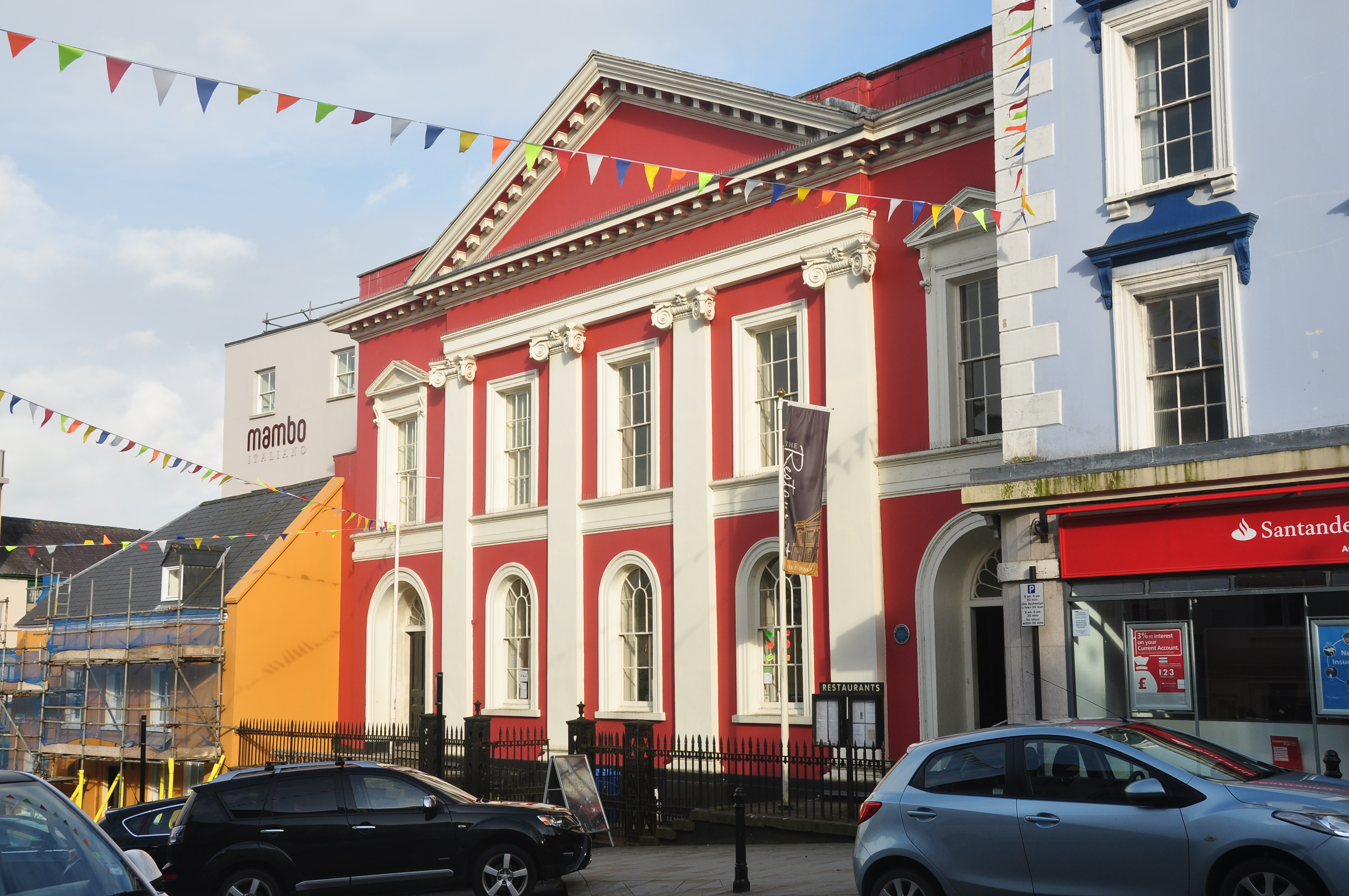
Shire Hall, Haverfordwest: First county council's meeting place 1889–1974

Elected county councils were established in 1889 under the Local Government Act 1888, taking over administrative functions previously performed by unelected magistrates at each county's quarter sessions. The town of Haverfordwest was a county corporate with its own quarter sessions, but was deemed too small to run its own county council functions; it was therefore included in administrative county of Pembrokeshire and administered by Pembrokeshire County Council.

The first elections were held in January 1889, and the council came into its powers on 1 April 1889. On that day the council held its formal meeting at the Shire Hall in Haverfordwest, the courthouse (built 1837) which had served as the meeting place of the quarter sessions which preceded the county council. Henry George Allen, a Liberal, was appointed the first chairman of the council.

The first incarnation of the county council was abolished in 1974 under the Local Government Act 1972. From 1 April 1974 the area was split between the two new districts of Preseli and South Pembrokeshire, both of which were subordinate to the new county of Dyfed, with county-level functions passing to the new Dyfed County Council.

In 1996 the councils established in 1974 were all abolished under the Local Government (Wales) Act 1994, and Pembrokeshire County Council was re-established as a unitary authority for the area.

== Political control ==
Since the 2017 election the council has been led by a coalition of some of the independent councillors, Labour, Plaid Cymru and the Liberal Democrats, with the same coalition continuing following the 2022 election.

The first election to the modern council was held in 1995, initially operating as a shadow authority before coming into its powers on 1 April 1996. Independent councillors have held over half the council's seats ever since 1996:

Party in control	Years
Independent	1996–present

Different groupings have formed among the independent councillors at different times, sometimes forming administrations with councillors from political parties. Between 1996 and 2017 the leader of the council came from the "Independent Political Group" (later called the "Independent Plus Political Group"). That group's numbers were reduced from 33 to 13 at the May 2017 election. Its leader Jamie Adams blamed the poor performance at that election on the IPPG's close connections to the council's discredited former chief executive.

=== Leadership ===
The leaders of the council since 1996 have been:

Councillor	Party	From	To	Notes
Eric Harries	Independent	1 Apr 1996	May 1999	Leading "Independent Political Group"
Maurice Hughes	Independent	20 May 1999	Jun 2004	Leading "Independent Political Group"
John Davies	Independent	29 Jun 2004	May 2012	Leading "Independent Plus Political Group" (IPPG)
Jamie Adams	Independent	24 May 2012	25 May 2017	Leading IPPG
David Simpson	Independent	25 May 2017	10 May 2024	
Jon Harvey	Independent	10 May 2024	15 May 2026	
Tessa Hodgson	Independent	15 May 2026		

=== Composition ===
Following the 2022 election and subsequent by-elections and changes of allegiance up to October 2026, the composition of the council was:

Party	Seats
Conservative	12
Labour	9
Plaid Cymru	3
Liberal Democrats	2
Reform	1
Independent	33
Total	60

Of the independent councillors, 18 sit together as the "Independent Group" and the other 15 are not affiliated to any group. The leader of the council, Tessa Hodgson, is one of the non-affiliated independent councillors, and positions of responsibility in the council's cabinet are held by other non-affiliated independents and members of the Labour, Plaid Cymru and Liberal Democrat groups. The next election is due in 2027.

=== Elections ===
Since the last boundary changes in 2022 the council has comprised 60 councillors, representing 59 wards. The ward of Pembroke: Monkton and St Mary South elects two councillors; all the other wards elect one councillor each.

Year	Seats	Independent	Labour	Plaid Cymru	Conservative	Liberal Democrats	Notes
1995	60	41	13	3	0	3	
1999	60	38	15	2	0	5	
2004	60	40	12	5	0	3	
2008	60	42	5	5	5	3	
2012	60	42	9	5	3	1	
2017	60	34	7	6	12	1	
2022	60	35	10	2	11	2	

Party with the most elected councillors in bold.

== Premises ==
The council is based at County Hall on Freemens Way in Haverfordwest.

The original county council generally held its meetings at the Shire Hall at 47 High Street, Haverfordwest. In 1923 the council acquired the former Pembrokeshire and Haverfordwest Infirmary at the corner of St Thomas Green and Winch Lane, which had been built in 1872, converting it to become their main offices. The old infirmary became known as the County Offices, and remained the council's headquarters until its abolition in 1974. The building was subsequently used as an area office by Dyfed County Council. Following the re-establishment of Pembrokeshire County Council in 1996 and the opening of a new County Hall in 1999 the County Offices became surplus to requirements and so were demolished and a leisure centre built on the site, opening in 2009.

When re-created in 1996 the council inherited offices from the two predecessor authorities: Cambria House in Haverfordwest from Preseli Pembrokeshire District Council and Llanion Park in Pembroke Dock from South Pembrokeshire District Council, along with the former County Offices of Dyfed County Council on St Thomas's Green in Haverfordwest. The first meeting of the new authority was held at Shire Hall, Haverfordwest, which had been the meeting place of the pre-1974 Pembrokeshire County Council. Subsequent meetings were held at Cambria House. It was decided shortly after the new council's creation to build a new headquarters adjoining Cambria House. The new building was named County Hall, with the first full council meeting in the new building being held in October 1999. Cambria House was demolished shortly afterwards. The new County Hall was formally opened by Queen Elizabeth II on 22 November 2001.

== Districts 1894–1974 ==
District councils subordinate to the county council were established under the Local Government Act 1894, replacing the earlier sanitary districts (except those which were municipal boroughs). The districts of Pembrokeshire from 1894 to 1974 were:

Name	From	To	Notes	Successor in 1974
Cemaes Rural District	1 Apr 1934	31 Mar 1974	Created from merger of St Dogmells Rural District and Llanfyrnach Rural District.	Preseli
Fishguard Urban District	1 Apr 1907	31 Mar 1934	Created from part of Haverfordwest Rural District. Abolished to become part of Fishguard and Goodwick Urban District.	n/a
Fishguard and Goodwick Urban District	1 Apr 1934	31 Mar 1974	Created from merger of separate Goodwick and Fishguard urban districts.	Preseli
Goodwick Urban District	1 Apr 1923	31 Mar 1934	Created from part of Haverfordwest Rural District. Abolished to become part of Fishguard and Goodwick Urban District.	n/a
Haverfordwest Municipal Borough	1 Apr 1889	31 Mar 1974	Predated creation of county council.	Preseli
Haverfordwest Rural District	28 Dec 1894	31 Mar 1974	Created from Haverfordwest Rural Sanitary District.	Preseli
Llanfyrnach Rural District	28 Dec 1894	31 Mar 1934	Created from the part of the Newcastle Emlyn Rural Sanitary District within Pembrokeshire. Abolished to become part of Cemaes Rural District.	n/a
Milford Haven Urban District	31 Dec 1894	31 Mar 1974	Created from Milford Improvement Commissioners District.	Preseli
Narberth Rural District	28 Dec 1894	31 Mar 1974	Created from Narberth Rural Sanitary District.	South Pembrokeshire
Narberth Urban District	1 Apr 1902	31 Mar 1974	Created from part of Narberth Rural District.	South Pembrokeshire
Neyland Urban District	1 Oct 1900	31 Mar 1974	Created from part of Pembroke Rural District.	Preseli
Pembroke Municipal Borough	1 Apr 1889	31 Mar 1974	Predated creation of county council.	South Pembrokeshire
Pembroke Rural District	28 Dec 1894	31 Mar 1974	Created from Pembroke Rural Sanitary District.	South Pembrokeshire
St Dogmells Rural District	28 Dec 1894	31 Mar 1934	Created from the part of the Cardigan Rural Sanitary District within Pembrokeshire. Abolished to become part of Cemaes Rural District.	n/a
Tenby Municipal Borough	1 Apr 1889	31 Mar 1974	Predated creation of county council.	South Pembrokeshire
