= Haverfordwest Rural District =

History of Pembrokeshire

Coordinates: 51.80202°N 4.96607°W

- Rural district
- Population
  - 1901: 20,275
  - 1971: 22,015
- History
  - Created: 28 December 1894
  - Abolished: 31 March 1974
  - Succeeded by: Preseli Pembrokeshire
  - HQ: Haverfordwest
- Contained within
  - County Council: Pembrokeshire

Haverfordwest Rural District was a rural district in the administrative county of Pembrokeshire, Wales from 1894 to 1974, covering an area in the west of the county. It surrounded, but did not include, the town of Haverfordwest after which it was named.

== Origins ==
The district had its origins in the Haverfordwest Poor Law Union, which had been created in 1837, covering Haverfordwest itself and a large surrounding rural area. A workhouse to serve the union was built on the southern edge of Haverfordwest in 1837–1839, later being called Priory Mount and St Thomas Hospital. In 1872 sanitary districts were established, giving public health and local government responsibilities for to the existing boards of guardians for the rural parts of their poor law unions that were not already covered by an urban authority. The Haverfordwest Rural Sanitary District therefore covered the area of the poor law union except for the towns of Haverfordwest, which was a municipal borough, and Milford Haven, which had its own improvement commissioners.

Under the Local Government Act 1894, rural sanitary districts became rural districts from 28 December 1894.

The town of Fishguard was removed from Haverfordwest Rural District in 1907 to become its own urban district. The adjoining town of Goodwick was similarly made its own urban district and removed from Haverfordwest Rural District in 1923. Goodwick and Fishguard urban districts went on to merge into a single urban district of Fishguard and Goodwick in 1934.

In 1934 the parishes of Burton, Llanstadwell and Rosemarket were transferred into Haverfordwest Rural District from the neighbouring Pembroke Rural District.

== Premises ==
Until the 1965 the council was based at 8–10 Picton Place in Haverfordwest. In 1965 the council built itself a new headquarters called Cambria House at Salutation Square, at the eastern end of Picton Place.

== Abolition ==
Haverfordwest Rural District was abolished under the Local Government Act 1972, merging with other nearby districts to become Preseli District (renamed Preseli Pembrokeshire in 1987). The former Haverfordwest Rural District Council offices at Cambria House subsequently served as the main offices of Preseli District Council throughout that council's existence. Following the re-establishment of Pembrokeshire County Council in 1996, Cambria House temporarily served as the new council's headquarters, whilst a new County Hall was built adjoining it the banks of the Western Cleddau river. County Hall opened in 1999 and Cambria House was demolished the following year.
