= Shire Hall, Haverfordwest =

County building in Haverfordwest, Wales

- Neuadd y Sir, Hwlffordd (Welsh)
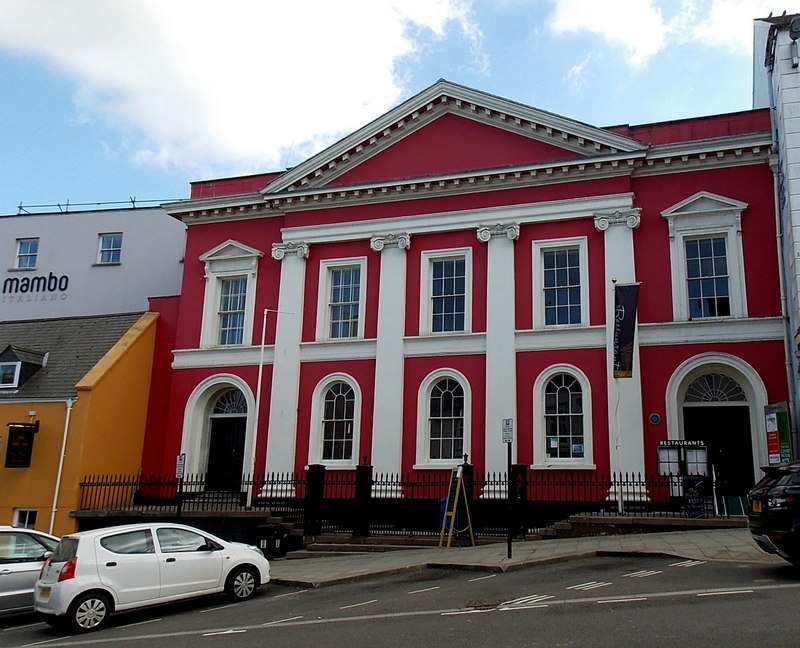
- Shire Hall, Haverfordwest

- Shown in Pembrokeshire
- 51.8016°N 4.9686°W
- Location: High Street, Haverfordwest

History
- Built: 1837

Site notes
- Architect: William Owen
- Architectural style: Neoclassical style

Listed Building – Grade II*
- Official name: The Shire Hall
- Designated: 12 October 1951
- Reference no.: 12110

The Shire Hall (Welsh: Neuadd y Sir Hwlffordd) is a municipal structure in the High Street, Haverfordwest, Pembrokeshire, Wales. The shire hall, which was the meeting place of the old Pembrokeshire County Council, is a Grade II* listed building.

== History ==
The building was commissioned by the justices as accommodation for the regular assizes: the site they selected was occupied by a Quaker meeting House. It was designed by William Owen in the neoclassical style, built in brick with a stucco finish and was completed in 1837. The design involved a symmetrical main frontage with five bays facing onto the High Street; the central section of three bays, which slightly projected forward, was fenestrated with round headed windows on the ground floor and square headed sash windows on the first floor. The windows in the central section were flanked by full height Ionic order pilasters supporting an entablature with a modillioned pediment above. The end bays featured round headed doors with fanlights on the ground floor, sash windows with consoled pediments on the first floor and a modillioned cornice above. Internally, the principal room was the courtroom.

In the early 1840s, the building was the venue for the trial of one of the leaders of the Rebecca Riots who had been involved in an incident at the Colby Scott Turnpike Gate. Following the implementation of the Local Government Act 1888, which established county councils in every county, it became necessary to establish a permanent meeting place for the newly formed Pembrokeshire County Council: internal alterations were carried out to a design by Arthur Thomas to create a council chamber 1901. The shire hall was regularly used for concerts and other public performances; the Haverfordwest Male Voice Choir performed their first concert in the building in 1896. It was also the venue, in March 1950, for the trial of the Rosemarket farmer, Albert Jenkins, who was found guilty of murdering his landlord, William Llewellyn, and subsequently executed by hanging.

The shire hall continued to host meetings of the county council until it was abolished in 1974 and continued to host hearings in the courthouse until it closed in June 2003. The new unitary authority, Pembrokeshire County Council, decided the building was surplus to requirements, conducted a competition for the disposal of the building and appointed Wetherspoons as its preferred bidder: the decision led to protests led by the Haverfordwest Civic Society who did not want to see the building converted into a public house. Wetherspoons subsequently withdrew their interest in the shire hall and converted a property in Quay Street instead.

A developer, Red Dragon Developments, acquired a 999-year lease on the shire hall, in February 2010, and carried out an extensive programme of refurbishment works. The works included the installation of a lift, the re-roofing of the building and the re-facing of the front elevation with lime plaster and red paint.

In May 2026, it was announced that the shire hall would be transformed into a theatre, cafe and pizza restaurant, after Pembrokeshire County Council's planning committee voted eleven votes to two to approve the request. The news was commended by MP Henry Tufnell. The end user of the theatre scheme, Drew Baker stated that the proposals would allow "one of the finest public buildings of its type in Wales proposals would allow “one of the finest public buildings of its type in Wales” to be brought back "into meaningful use."

== See also ==
- Grade II* listed buildings in Pembrokeshire
