= Pembroke St Michael =

Coordinates: 51.670°N 4.898°W

- Electoral ward
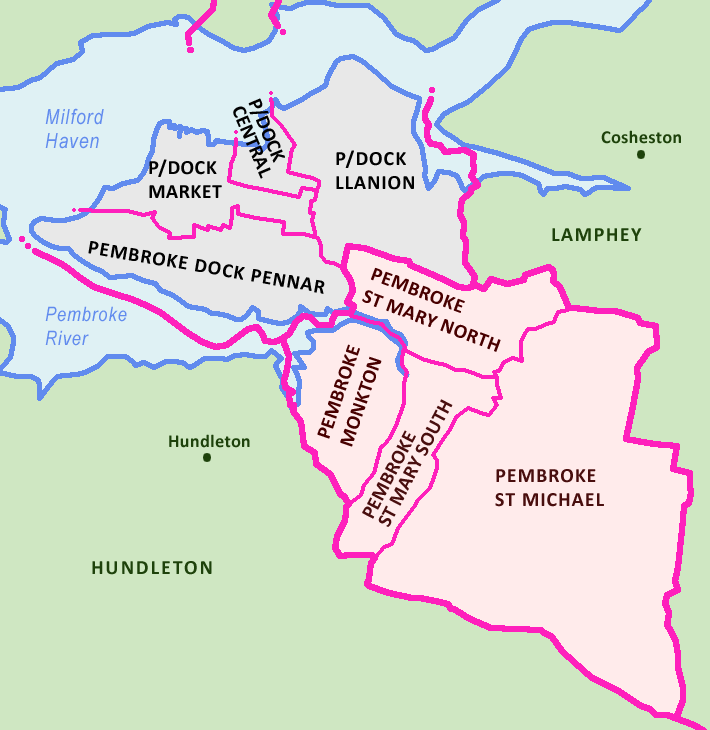
- Ward locations within the towns of Pembroke and Pembroke Dock until 2022

- Location within Pembrokeshire
- Population: 2,408 (2011 census)
- Principal area: Pembrokeshire
- Country: Wales
- Sovereign state: United Kingdom
- Post town: PEMBROKE
- Postcode district: SA71
- Dialling code: +44-1646
- UK Parliament: Mid and South Pembrokeshire
- Senedd Cymru – Welsh Parliament: Carmarthen West and South Pembrokeshire
- Councillors: 1 (County); 3 (Town Council)

Pembroke St Michael is an electoral ward in the town of Pembroke, Pembrokeshire, Wales. It covers the east area of the town.

The ward currently elects a county councillor to Pembrokeshire County Council and three town councillors to Pembroke Town Council. Prior to local government reorganisation in 1995, the ward elected two councillors to South Pembrokeshire District Council and an electoral division with the same name covering a slightly larger area elected one county councillor to Dyfed County Council.

According to the 2011 UK Census the population of the ward was 2,408.

A boundary review took place in 2019, where it was noted that the number of eligible voters was 32% above the average for an electoral ward in Pembrokeshire. As a result, it was recommended that part of the ward was transferred to the neighbouring St Mary South ward, reducing the number of electors by 531. These changes came into effect in 2021.

== County elections ==
=== Dyfed County Council elections ===
The Pembroke St. Michael electoral division was first contested in the 1989 Dyfed County Council election, following its introduction in 1988. The electoral division consisted of the Hundleton, Pembroke St. Michael and Stackpole wards and the Community of Lamphey. One seat to Dyfed County Council was available.

1993 Dyfed County Council election
Party	Candidate	Votes	%	±%
Liberal Democrats	John Martin Allen	652	51.0	+3.5
Labour	David William Edwards	627	49.0	
Majority			2.0	
Turnout			32.9	−4.0
Liberal Democrats gain from Independent		Swing		

1989 Dyfed County Council election
Party	Candidate	Votes	%	±%
Independent	Rev G.R. Ball	738	52.5	
SLD	A. Hovey	667	47.5	
Majority			5.1	
Turnout			36.9	
Independent win (new seat)				

=== Pembrokeshire County Council elections ===
Following re-organization of local government, Dyfed County Council and the district councils were abolished and replaced with Pembrokeshire County Council. The ward boundaries from the South Pembrokeshire District Council were retained, with one seat available to the new county council, which was first contested in the 1995 Pembrokeshire County Council election. As of 2018, six elections have been held for the seat, the most recent in 2017.

2017 Pembrokeshire County Council election
Party	Candidate	Votes	%	±%
Conservative	Aden Arthur Brinn	557	56.7	
Independent	Jonathan Anthony Robert Nutting*	425	43.3	
Majority		132		
Conservative gain from Independent		Swing		

2012 Pembrokeshire County Council election
Party	Candidate	Votes	%	±%
Independent	Jonathan Anthony Robert Nutting	489	53.1	
Conservative	Aden Arthur Brinn*	432	46.9	
Majority		57		
Independent gain from Conservative		Swing		

2008 Pembrokeshire County Council election
Party	Candidate	Votes	%	±%
Conservative	Aden Arthur Brinn*	527	51.9	
Liberal Democrats	Gareth Jones	384	37.8	
Plaid Cymru	Eirug Roberts	104	10.2	
Majority		143		
Conservative hold		Swing		

Due to the death of the sitting councillor John Allen in July 2007, a by-election was called for the Pembroke St Michael seat. It took place on 20 November 2007, and saw Conservative candidate Aden Brinn narrowly elected as councillor ahead of Liberal Democrat candidate Gareth Jones, with a nine-vote majority.

2007 Pembroke St Michael By-election
Party	Candidate	Votes	%	±%
Conservative	Aden Arthur Brinn	251	30.6	
Liberal Democrats	Gareth Jones	242	29.5	
Independent	David Owen	184	22.5	
Labour	David Edwards	142	17.3	
Majority		9		
Conservative gain from Liberal Democrats		Swing		

2004 Pembrokeshire County Council election
Party	Candidate	Votes	%	±%
Liberal Democrats	John Martin Allen*	472	58.4	
Independent	Aden Arthur Brinn	336	41.6	
Majority		136		
Liberal Democrats hold		Swing		

1999 Pembrokeshire County Council election
Party	Candidate	Votes	%	±%
Liberal Democrats	John Martin Allen*	466	55.1	
Conservative	Aden Arthur Brinn	380	44.9	
Majority		86		
Liberal Democrats hold		Swing		

The initial May 1995 county election was won by Liberal Democrat candidate John Allen, who had previously held the Pembroke St Michael seat on Dyfed County Council aince 1993.

1995 Pembrokeshire County Council election
Party	Candidate	Votes	%	±%
Liberal Democrats	John Martin Allen	407	54.4	
Labour	Clive John Collins	341	45.6	
Majority		66		
Liberal Democrats win (new seat)				

== District Council elections ==
The ward was introduced in 1986 following a boundary re-alignment. and first contested in the 1987 South Pembrokeshire District Council election. Two seats to the South Pembrokeshire District Council were available.

=== Pembroke St Michael (two seats) ===
1991 South Pembrokeshire District Council election
Party	Candidate	Votes	%	±%
Independent	G.A. Hay-Watkins	433		
Independent	Clive John Collins*	408		
Independent	J.C. Robinson	213		
Independent hold		Swing		
Independent hold		Swing		

1987 South Pembrokeshire District Council election
Party	Candidate	Votes	%	±%
Independent	D.H. Lloyd	470		
Independent	Clive John Collins	380		
Labour	G.A. Hay-Watkins	325		
Independent	E. Reed	301		
Independent win (new seat)				
Independent win (new seat)				

== See also ==
- List of electoral wards in Pembrokeshire
