= Cilgerran (electoral ward) =

Electoral ward in Pembrokeshire, Wales

Cilgerran was an electoral ward in Pembrokeshire, Wales. The ward consisted of the communities of Cilgerran and Manordeifi. The community of Cilgerran consists of part of Pembrokeshire Coast National Park.

A ward of Pembrokeshire County Council since 1995 it was previously a ward of the former Preseli Pembrokeshire District Council. In 2022 the wards of Pembrokeshire were abolished and replaced by 59 new wards; Cilgerran became part of the Cilgerran and Eglwyswrw ward (with Eglwyswrw) and Manordeifi was included in the Boncath and Clydau ward (with Boncath and Clydau).

== History ==
At the first election for the new Pembrokeshire County Council in 1995, a new Independent candidate was elected.

Cilgerran
| Party | Candidate | Votes | % | ±% |
|---|---|---|---|---|
| Independent | Rev Dafydd Henry Edwards | | | |
| Labour | Michael Frederick McNamara | | | |
| Conservative | Norman Hird | | | |
| Majority | | | | |
| Independent hold | | Swing | | |

At the second election, in 1999, Dafydd Edwards was defeated by another Independent, John Davies. John Davies later became leader of the Council.

Cilgerran 1999
| Party | Candidate | Votes | % | ±% |
|---|---|---|---|---|
| Independent | John Thomas Davies | 478 | | |
| Independent | Rev Dafydd Henry Edwards* | 227 | | |
| Labour | Michael Frederick McNamara | 161 | | |
| Majority | | 251 | | |
| Independent hold | | Swing | | |

At the third election, in 2004 John Davies retained his seat by a large majority.

Cilgerran
| Party | Candidate | Votes | % | ±% |
|---|---|---|---|---|
| Independent | John Thomas Davies* | 698 | | |
| Plaid Cymru | Matthew Lee Mathias | 111 | | |
| Majority | | 587 | | |
| Independent hold | | Swing | | |

Davies was returned unopposed in 2008.

Cilgerran 2008
| Party | Candidate | Votes | % | ±% |
|---|---|---|---|---|
| Independent | John Thomas Davies* | unopposed | | |
| Independent hold | | Swing | | |

In 2012, Davies was re-elected by a huge majority.

Cilgerran 2012
| Party | Candidate | Votes | % | ±% |
|---|---|---|---|---|
| Independent | John Thomas Davies* | 751 | | |
| Plaid Cymru | Kett Seymour | 51 | | |
| Majority | | 700 | | |
| Independent hold | | Swing | | |
