= Carew (electoral ward) =

Electoral ward in Pembrokeshire, Wales

Carew was the name of an electoral ward in Pembrokeshire, Wales. It was also coterminous with the boundaries of the community of Carew.

A ward of Pembrokeshire County Council since 1995 it was previously a ward of the former South Pembrokeshire District Council.

Following the recommendations of a boundary review by the Local Government Boundary Commission for Wales, effective from the 2022 local elections, the Carew ward was merged with the neighbouring community of Jeffreyston to create a new ward of 'Carew and Jeffreyston'.

== Election results ==
=== 2012 ===
In 2012, Neale was returned unopposed.

Carew 2012
Party	Candidate	Votes	%	±%
Independent	David James Neale*	unopposed		
Independent hold		Swing		

=== 2008 ===
Neale retained the seat in 2008.

Carew 2008
Party	Candidate	Votes	%	±%
Independent	David James Neale*	301	54.5	
Conservative	Nigel Birt-Llewellin	136	24.6	
Independent	Norman Richard Parry	115	20.8	
Majority				
Independent hold		Swing		

=== 2004 ===
At the third election, in 2004 Norman Parry was defeated, finishing last in a four-cornered contest.

Carew 2004
Party	Candidate	Votes	%	±%
Independent	David James Neale	200		
Independent	Derek Hooper Lloyd	181		
Labour	Michael Thorne	152		
Independent	Norman Richard Parry*	118		
Majority				
Independent hold		Swing		

=== 1999 ===
At the second election, in 1999 the Conservative Party fielded candidates in Pembrokeshire for the first time but they were defeated in Carew.

Carew 1999
Party	Candidate	Votes	%	±%
Independent	Norman Richard Parry*	280	52.5	−14.4
Conservative	Richard Frederick Shepherd	144	27.0	+27.0
Independent	Frances Little	109	20.5	+20.5
Majority		136	25.5	−8.3
Independent hold		Swing		

=== 1995 ===
At the first election for the new Pembrokeshire County Council in 1995, an Independent, previously a member of South Pembrokeshire District Council was elected.

Carew
Party	Candidate	Votes	%	±%
Independent	Norman Richard Parry*	330	66.9	
Independent	Brian McMahon	163	33.1	
Majority		167	33.8	
Independent hold		Swing		
