= Pembroke St Mary North =

Coordinates: 51.6804°N 4.9137°W

- Electoral ward
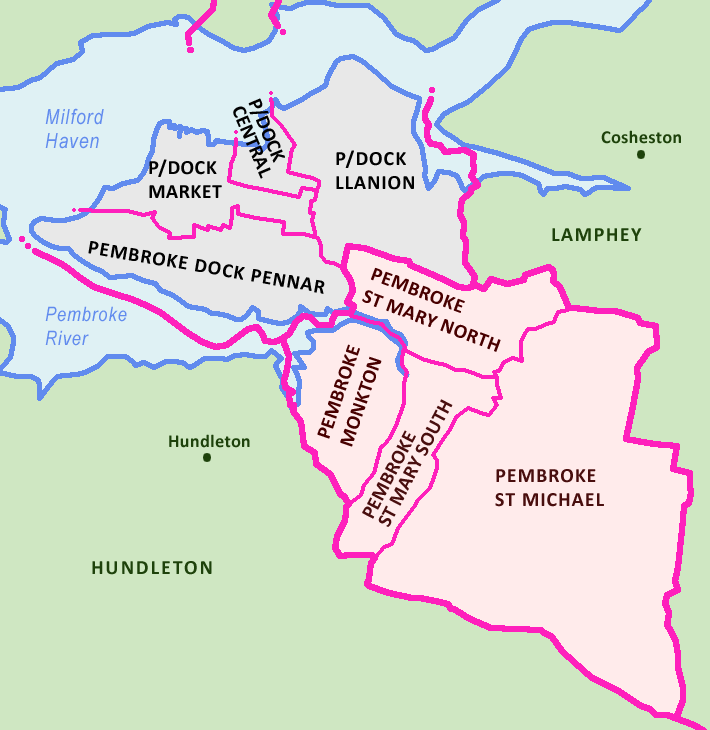
- Ward locations within the towns of Pembroke and Pembroke Dock until 2022

- Location within Pembrokeshire
- Population: 2,060 (2011 census)
- Principal area: Pembrokeshire
- Country: Wales
- Sovereign state: United Kingdom
- Post town: PEMBROKE
- Postcode district: SA71
- Dialling code: +44-1646
- UK Parliament: Mid and South Pembrokeshire
- Senedd Cymru – Welsh Parliament: Carmarthen West and South Pembrokeshire
- Councillors: 1 (County); 3 (Town Council)

Pembroke St Mary North is an electoral ward in the town of Pembroke, Pembrokeshire, Wales. It covers the area of the town north of the Pembroke River and the Mill Pond.

The ward elects a county councillor to Pembrokeshire County Council and four town councillors to Pembroke Town Council.

According to the 2011 UK Census the population of the ward was 2,060.

In July 2018 the sitting county councillor, David 'Dai' Boswell, was convicted and sentenced to 18 years in prison for rape and indecent assault. He resigned from his roles as county and town councillor. He had earlier resigned as mayor of Pembroke. A by-election was planned for 13 September 2018, with eight candidates putting themselves forward for the county council seat.

== County elections ==
As a result of the resignation of Dai Bowsell, a by-election for the Pembroke St Mary North was held on 13 September 2018. It was won from the Welsh Conservative by independent candidate, Jon Harvey, who had finished second to Boswell in 2017 by six votes.

2018 Pembrokeshire County Council by-election
Party	Candidate	Votes	%	±%
Independent	Jon Harvey	187		
Independent	Daphne Bush	79		
Independent	Jonathan Nutting	77		
Labour	Maureen Bowen	61		
Independent	Robert Boucher	59		
Conservative	Natalie Carey	45		
Independent	Lynette Edwards	42		
Independent	Arwyn Williams	26		

At the May 2017 county election Pembroke St Mary North result was won from the Independents by Welsh Conservative candidate, Dai Boswell. The Conservatives also won seats from the Independent councillors in the neighbouring wards of Pembroke St Mary South and Pembroke St Michael.

2017 Pembrokeshire County Council election
Party	Candidate	Votes	%	±%
Conservative	Dai Boswell	217		
Independent	Jon Harvey	211		
Labour	David Edwards	122		

At the May 2012 county election Pembroke St Mary North result was retained by Independent councillor Arwyn Williams. Councillor Williams had been county councillor for nine years and a community councillor for thirty years. Following the election, Williams became Chairman of the county council.

2012 Pembrokeshire County Council election
Party	Candidate	Votes	%	±%
Independent	Arwyn Williams *	304		
Conservative	Ceri-Ann Bowles	136		

At the May 2008 county election Pembroke St Mary North result was retained by Independent councillor Arwyn Williams.

2008 Pembrokeshire County Council election
Party	Candidate	Votes	%	±%
Independent	Arwyn Williams*	230	37.2	
Labour	Tom Barrass	196	31.7	
Independent	Nikki Anderson	140	22.6	
Liberal Democrats	Stephanie Ashley	53	8.6	
Majority		34		

At the June 2004 county election Pembroke St Mary North was won by Independent councillor Arwyn Williams.

2004 Pembrokeshire County Council election
Party	Candidate	Votes	%	±%
Independent	Arwyn Williams	238		
Independent	Kenneth Bryan Phillips*	194		
Labour	Jane Margueritta Major*	179		
Majority		44		

* = sitting councillor prior to the election

== See also ==
- List of electoral wards in Pembrokeshire
