= Pembroke St Mary South =

Coordinates: 51.672°N 4.918°W

- Electoral ward
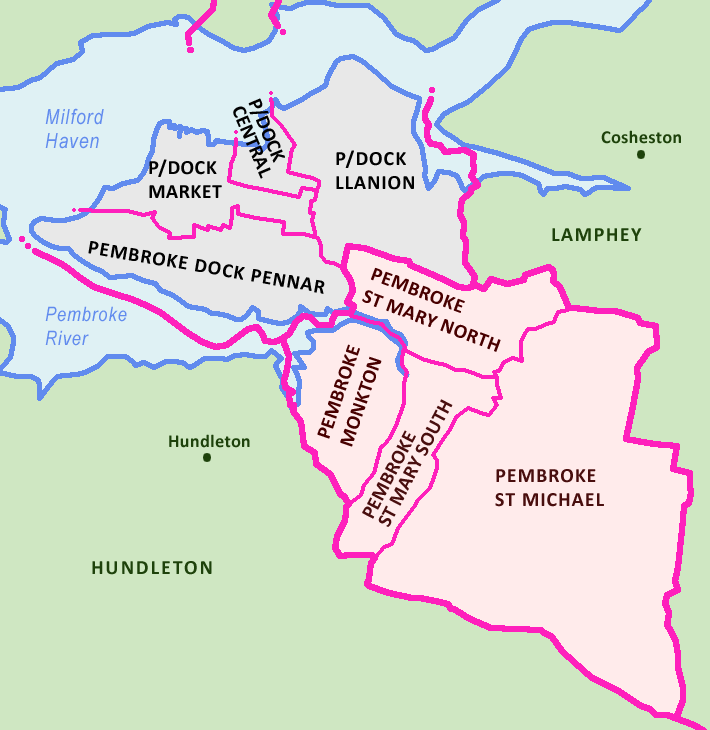
- Pre-2022 ward locations within the towns of Pembroke and Pembroke Dock

- Location within Pembrokeshire
- Population: 1,434 (2011 census)
- Principal area: Pembrokeshire
- Country: Wales
- Sovereign state: United Kingdom
- Post town: PEMBROKE
- Postcode district: SA71
- Dialling code: +44-1646
- UK Parliament: Mid and South Pembrokeshire
- Senedd Cymru – Welsh Parliament: Carmarthen West and South Pembrokeshire
- Councillors: 1 (County); 3 (Town Council)

Pembroke St Mary South was the name of an electoral ward in the town of Pembroke, Pembrokeshire, Wales. It covers the area including the town centre and Pembroke Castle and the town immediately to the west of St Daniel's Hill.

The ward elected a county councillor to Pembrokeshire County Council and three town councillors to Pembroke Town Council.

According to the 2011 UK Census the population of the ward was 1,434.

A boundary review took place in 2019, where it was noted that the number of eligible voters was 33% below the average for an electoral ward in Pembrokeshire. As a result it was recommended that part of the neighbouring St Michael ward was transferred to the St Mary South ward, increasing the number of electors by 531. It was also proposed that the ward be combined with the neighbouring Monkton electoral ward, with the resulting ward electing two county councillors. These changes came into effect in 2021, with the creation of a new electoral ward named Pembroke Monkton and St Mary South.

== County elections ==
At the May 2017 county election the Pembroke St Mary South result was the first to be announced. The sitting Independent councillor Daphne Bush (a member of the ruling Independent Plus Group) was beaten by the Welsh Conservative candidate, Aaron Leigh-Carey. The Conservatives also won seats from the Independent councillors in the neighbouring wards of Pembroke St Mary North and Pembroke St Michael.

2017 Pembrokeshire County Council election
Party	Candidate	Votes	%	±%
Conservative	Aaron Leigh-Carey	181		
Independent	Melanie Phillips	109		
Independent	Daphne Bush *	94		
Independent	Jacob Taylor	91		

* = sitting councillor prior to the election

== See also ==
- List of electoral wards in Pembrokeshire
