= Pembroke Monkton and St Mary South =

Coordinates: 51.672°N 4.918°W

- Electoral ward
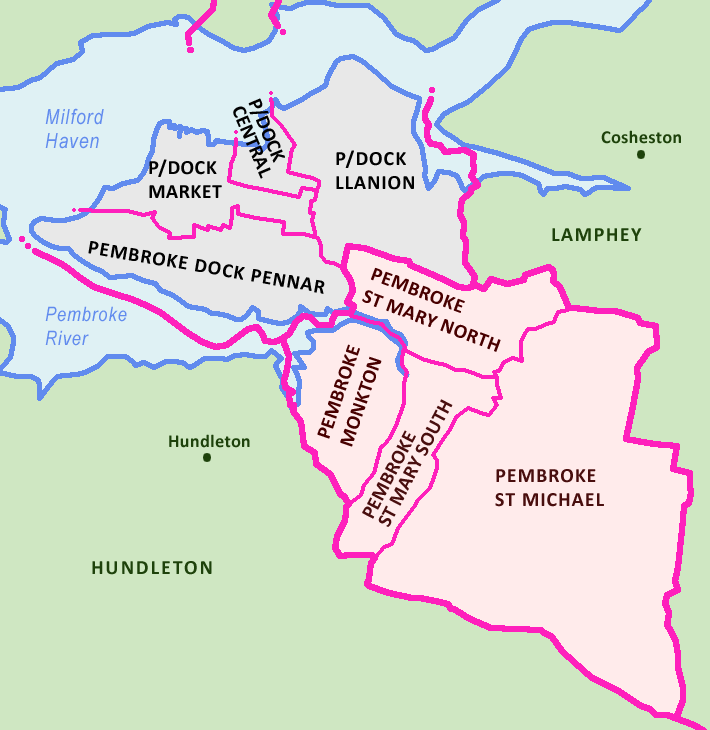
- Ward locations within the towns of Pembroke and Pembroke Dock (pre-2021)

- Location within Pembrokeshire
- Principal area: Pembrokeshire
- Country: Wales
- Sovereign state: United Kingdom
- Post town: PEMBROKE
- Postcode district: SA71
- Dialling code: +44-1646
- UK Parliament: Mid and South Pembrokeshire
- Senedd Cymru – Welsh Parliament: Carmarthen West and South Pembrokeshire
- Councillors: 2 (County)

Pembroke Monkton and St Mary South is an electoral ward in the town of Pembroke, Pembrokeshire, Wales. The ward elects two county councillors to Pembrokeshire County Council. The seats will be contested for the first time in the 2022 Pembrokeshire County Council election. The ward replaced the Pembroke Monkton and Pembroke St Mary South electoral wards, which each elected one county councillor.

The ward was created following a boundary review which took place in 2019. The review noted the existing Pembroke Monkton and Pembroke St Mary South both having a lower number of electors than the county average. As a result, it was recommended to combine the two and transfer part of the neighbouring Pembroke St Michael into the merged ward to increase the number of electors. The Welsh Government accepted the changes and they took effect in 2021.

== See also ==
- List of electoral wards in Pembrokeshire
