= 1995 Pembrokeshire County Council election =

1995 Welsh local government election

The first elections to Pembrokeshire County Council were held on 4 May 1995. It was followed by the 1999 election. On the same day there were elections to the other 21 local authorities in Wales and community councils in Wales.

== Overview ==
All council seats were up for election. These were the first elections held following local government reorganisation and the abolition of Dyfed County Council. The ward boundaries for the new authority were based on the previous Preseli Pembrokeshire District Council and South Pembrokeshire District Council with the majority of wards continuing to elect one councillor. In some cases where two or three members were previously elected the number of representatives was reduced.

Pembrokeshire County Council election result 1995
Party	Seats	Gains	Losses	Net gain/loss	Seats %	Votes %	Votes	+/−
Independent	42							
Labour	13							
Liberal Democrats	3							
Plaid Cymru	2						844	
Conservative	0				0.0		155	
Green	0				0.0		71	

== Candidates ==
Most sitting members of Dyfed County council sought election to the new authority. A number were also members of the previous district councils but others contested a ward against a sitting district councillor.

== Results by ward ==
=== Amroth ===
The boundaries were identical to those of the same ward on the previous South Pembrokeshire District Council. The retiring Independent district councillor (and also the county councillor), A.W. Edwards, sought election for the neighbouring Lampeter Velfrey ward and the seat was taken unopposed by the Liberal Democrat candidate.

Amroth 1995
Party	Candidate	Votes	%	±%
Liberal Democrats	Ronald Young Cameron	Unopposed		
Liberal Democrats gain from Independent				

=== Begelly ===
The elected candidate was the retiring district councillor.

Begelly 1995
Party	Candidate	Votes	%	±%
Independent	John Scott Murphy*	398		
Independent	Neil Jackson	258		
Independent	Thomas John Price	111		
Majority		101		
Independent hold		Swing		

=== Brawdy ===
The elected candidate was the retiring district councillor.

Brawdy 1995
Party	Candidate	Votes	%	±%
Independent	William Leslie Raymond*	Unopposed		
Independent hold				

=== Burton ===
The boundaries were identical to those of the same ward on the previous Preseli Pembrokeshire District Council. The elected candidate was the retiring district councillor.

Burton 1995
Party	Candidate	Votes	%	±%
Independent	Lewis James Lloyd*	432	74.9	
Labour	Trevor Thomas	145	25.1	
Majority		287	49.8	
Independent hold		Swing		

=== Camrose ===
The boundaries were identical to those of the same ward on the previous Preseli Pembrokeshire District Council. The elected candidate was the retiring district councillor.

Camrose 1995
Party	Candidate	Votes	%	±%
Independent	James Desmond Edward Codd*	Unopposed		
Independent hold				

=== Carew ===
The boundaries were identical to those of the same ward on the previous South Pembrokeshire District Council. The elected candidate was the retiring district councillor.

Carew 1995
Party	Candidate	Votes	%	±%
Independent	Norman Richard Parry*	330	66.9	
Independent	Brian McMahon	163	33.1	
Majority		167	33.8	
Independent hold		Swing		

=== Cilgerran ===
The boundaries were identical to those of the same ward on the previous Preseli Pembrokeshire District Council.

Cilgerran
Party	Candidate	Votes	%	±%
Independent	Rev Dafydd Henry Edwards	308		
Labour	Michael Frederick McNamara	229		
Conservative	Norman Hird	155		
Majority				
Independent hold		Swing		

=== Clydau ===
The boundaries were identical to those of the same ward on the previous Preseli District Council. The retiring district councillor did not seek re-election.

Clydau 1995
Party	Candidate	Votes	%	±%
Plaid Cymru	Rev Aled Wyn ap Gwynedd	unopposed		

=== Crymych ===
The boundaries were identical to those of the same ward on the previous Preseli District Council. The elected candidate was the retiring district councillor.

Crymych 1995
Party	Candidate	Votes	%	±%
Independent	John Lynn Davies*	unopposed		
Independent hold		Swing		

=== Dinas Cross ===
The boundaries were identical to those of the same ward on the previous Preseli District Council. The elected candidate was the retiring district councillor. The defeated candidate had been Dyfed County Councillor for St Dogmaels since 1993.

Dinas Cross 1995
Party	Candidate	Votes	%	±%
Independent	Alun John Bringley Griffiths*	508	76.3	
Independent	John William James Roberts+	158	23.7	
Majority		350	52.6	
Independent hold		Swing		

=== East Williamston ===
The boundaries were identical to those of the same ward on the previous South Pembrokeshire District Council. The elected candidate was the retiring district councillor.

East Williamston 1995
Party	Candidate	Votes	%	±%
Independent	David Gordon Williams*	425	71.5	
Independent	Jennifer Mary Bradley	169	28.5	
Majority		256	43.0	
Independent hold		Swing		

=== Fishguard (two seats) ===
The boundaries were identical to those of the same ward on the previous Preseli District Council. The elected candidates were the retiring district councillors.

Fishguard 1995
Party	Candidate	Votes	%	±%
Labour	Alexander Frederick Allison*	unopposed		
Independent	Delwyn Davies*	unopposed		
Labour hold		Swing		
Independent hold		Swing		

=== Goodwick ===
The boundaries were identical to those of the same ward on the previous Preseli Pembrokeshire District Council. The elected candidate was the Dyfed County Councillor for Fishguard. The retiring district councillor was defeated.

Goodwick 1995
Party	Candidate	Votes	%	±%
Independent	William Lloyd Evans+	508	66.9	
Independent	William Brynmor Colnet*	251	33.1	
Majority		257	33.8	
Independent hold		Swing		

=== Haverfordwest Castle ===
The boundaries were identical to those of the same ward on the previous Preseli Pembrokeshire District Council. The sitting Independent member, Beryl Thomas-Cleaver, was heavily defeated.

Haverfordwest Castle 1995
Party	Candidate	Votes	%	±%
Labour	Thomas Baden Tudor	304	39.1	
Independent	Mike Davies	257	33.1	
Independent	Beryl Mary Thomas-Cleaver*	112	14.4	
Independent	Mary Sinnett	104	13.4	
Majority		47	6.0	
Labour gain from Independent		Swing		

=== Haverfordwest Garth (two seats) ===
The boundaries were identical to those of the same ward on the previous Preseli Pembrokeshire District Council, although the number of seats were reduced from three to two. One of the elected candidates was a retiring district councillor. Another retiring councillor lost his seat to a Labour Party challenger. While the number of seats were reduced, Haverfordwest Garth can also be classified as an Independent hold and a Labour gain from Independent.

Haverfordwest Garth 1995
Party	Candidate	Votes	%	±%
Independent	Peter Alan Stock*	1,352	88.3	
Labour	Elizabeth Joyce Watson	688	44.9	
Independent	Donald Richard Twigg*	666	43.5	
Independent	Barbara Ann Morgan	357	23.3	
Majority				
Independent win (new seat)				
Labour win (new seat)				

=== Haverfordwest Prendergast ===
The boundaries were identical to those of the same ward on the previous Preseli Pembrokeshire District Council. The elected councilor was the sitting county councillor for Haverfordwest Priory, (which included the Castle and Prendergast wards). He defeated the sitting district councillor for Prendergast.

Haverfordwest Prendergast 1995
Party	Candidate	Votes	%	±%
Independent	Haydn Eric Davies+	544		
Independent	Jim G. Nicholas*	201		
Majority		343		
Independent hold		Swing		

=== Haverfordwest Priory ===
The boundaries were identical to those of the same ward on the previous Preseli Pembrokeshire District Council.

Haverfordwest Priory 1995
Party	Candidate	Votes	%	±%
Independent	Joseph Absalom Roy Folland	279		
Labour	Jeffrey Bernard Thomas	261		
Independent	Meriel P. Lewis	196		
Majority		18		
Independent hold		Swing		

=== Hundleton / Stackpole ===
The boundaries were identical to those of the combined Hundleton and Stackpole wards on the previous South Pembrokeshire District Council. The elected candidate was the retiring district councillor for Hundleton. The retiring member for Stackpole was defeated. Although a new seat, Hundleton / Stackpole can also be classified as an Independent hold.

Hundleton / Stackpole 1995
Party	Candidate	Votes	%	±%
Independent	John Seymore Allen-Mierhouse*	394		
Labour	Valerie Lucarda Jones	217		
Independent	Anthony Stenson*	70		
Majority		177		
Independent win (new seat)				

=== Johnston ===
The boundaries were identical to those of the same ward on the previous Preseli Pembrokeshire District Council. The elected candidate was the retiring district councillor.

Johnston 1995
Party	Candidate	Votes	%	±%
Independent	George Charles Grey	unopposed		
Majority				
Independent hold		Swing		

=== Lampeter Velfrey ===
The boundaries were identical to those of the same ward on the previous South Pembrokeshire District Council. The elected candidate was the retiring district councillor for the Amroth Ward.

Lampeter Velfrey 1995
Party	Candidate	Votes	%	±%
Independent	Alan Walter Edwards+*	388		
Labour	Donna Elizabeth Lewis	256		
Majority		132		
Independent hold		Swing		

=== Lamphey ===
The boundaries were identical to those of the same ward on the previous South Pembrokeshire District Council. The elected candidate was the retiring district councillor.

Lamphey 1995
Party	Candidate	Votes	%	±%
Labour	David William Edwards	296		
Independent	Richard Frederick Shepherd	194		
Independent	Dilys Tice	115		
Majority		102		
Independent hold		Swing		

=== Letterston ===
The boundaries were identical to those of the same ward on the previous Preseli Pembrokeshire District Council.

Letterston 1995
Party	Candidate	Votes	%	±%
Independent	Thomas James Richards	378		
Independent	Dewi Llewellyn James+	214		
Liberal Democrats	Michael Ian Warden	209		
Majority		164		
Independent hold		Swing		

=== Llangwm ===
The boundaries were identical to those of the same ward on the previous Preseli Pembrokeshire District Council. The elected candidate was the retiring district councillor and also the Dyfed County Councillor for Llangwm since 1985.

Llangwm 1995
Party	Candidate	Votes	%	±%
Independent	William Henry Hitchings+*	460		
Independent	James Lester Brock	407		
Majority		53		
Independent hold		Swing		

=== Maenclochog ===
The boundaries were identical to those of the same ward on the previous Preseli Pembrokeshire District Council. The elected candidate was the Dyfed County Councillor for Rudbaxton for many years.

Maenclochog 1995
Party	Candidate	Votes	%	±%
Independent	David John Thomas+	643		
Green	Eleanor Clegg	71		
Majority				
Independent hold		Swing		

=== Manorbier ===
The boundaries were identical to those of the same ward on the previous South Pembrokeshire District Council. The elected candidate was the Dyfed County Councillor for Manorbier.

Manorbier 1995
Party	Candidate	Votes	%	±%
Independent	Patricia Edwina Griffiths+	unopposed		
Independent hold		Swing		

=== Martletwy ===
The boundaries were identical to those of the same ward on the previous South Pembrokeshire District Council. The elected candidate was the retiring district councillor.

Martletwy 1995
Party	Candidate	Votes	%	±%
Independent	Thomas Elwyn James*	unopposed		
Independent hold		Swing		

=== Merlin’s Bridge ===
The boundaries were identical to those of the same ward on the previous Preseli Pembrokeshire District Council. The elected candidate was the retiring district councillor.

Merlin's Bridge 1995
Party	Candidate	Votes	%	±%
Independent	Cyril George Maurice Hughes*	unopposed		
Independent hold		Swing		

=== Milford Central and East (two seats) ===
The boundaries were identical to those of the same ward on the previous Preseli Pembrokeshire District Council.

Milford Central 1995
Party	Candidate	Votes	%	±%
Labour	Malcolm William Pratt	715		
Liberal Democrats	Thomas Hutton Sinclair+	669		
Independent	Anne Hughes	583		
Independent	Stanley Thomas Hudson*	535		
Independent	William John Kenneth Williams	216		

=== Milford Hakin (two seats) ===
The boundaries were identical to those of the same ward on the previous Preseli Pembrokeshire District Council.

Milford Hakin 1995
Party	Candidate	Votes	%	±%
Labour	Terry Mills	770		
Independent	Eric Ronald Harries+*	745		
Independent	George Noel William Max*	712		
Independent	Arthur George Edwards*	425		
Independent	Alun Emanuel Byrne	371		
Independent	Edward Terence Bowen	323		
Independent	Barrie Thomas Woolmer	242		

=== Milford North and West (two seats) ===
The boundaries were identical to those of the same ward on the previous Preseli Pembrokeshire District Council.

Milford North and West 1995
Party	Candidate	Votes	%	±%
Labour	David John Adams+	826		
Independent	Edward George Setterfield*	682		
Independent	John William Cole	492		
Independent	Irwin Edwards	335		

=== Narberth ===
The boundaries were identical to those of the same ward on the previous South Pembrokeshire District Council. The elected candidate was the retiring district councillor.

Narberth 1995
Party	Candidate	Votes	%	±%
Independent	Thomas David Watkins*	unopposed		
Independent hold		Swing		

=== Narberth Rural ===
The boundaries were identical to those of the same ward on the previous South Pembrokeshire District Council. The elected candidate was the retiring district councillor.

Narberth Rural 1995
Party	Candidate	Votes	%	±%
Independent	William Richard Colin Davies*	unopposed		
Independent hold		Swing		

=== Newport ===
The boundaries were identical to those of the same ward on the previous Preseli Pembrokeshire District Council.

Newport 1995
Party	Candidate	Votes	%	±%
Independent	Essex Robert John Havard	399		
Independent	Elwyn George John*	104		
Majority		295		
Independent hold		Swing		

=== Neyland East ===
The boundaries were identical to those of the same ward on the previous Preseli Pembrokeshire District Council. The elected candidate was the retiring district councillor.

Neyland East 1995
Party	Candidate	Votes	%	±%
Labour	Simon Leslie Hancock*	unopposed		
Labour hold		Swing		

=== Neyland West ===
Neyland West 1995
Party	Candidate	Votes	%	±%
Labour	Kenneth Arthur Edwards	503		
Independent	Patricia Ann Gilbert*	304		
Majority		199		
Labour gain from Independent		Swing		

=== Pembroke Monkton ===
The boundaries were identical to those of the same ward on the previous South Pembrokeshire District Council.

Pembroke Monkton 1995
Party	Candidate	Votes	%	±%
Labour	Kenvyn Corris Jones	330		
Independent	Dillwyn Morgan Davies*	256		
Majority		74		
Labour hold		Swing		

=== Pembroke St Mary (two seats) ===
The boundaries were identical to those of the same ward on the previous South Pembrokeshire District Council.

Pembroke St Mary 1995
Party	Candidate	Votes	%	±%
Labour	Clifford Henry Darlington	572		
Independent	Kenneth Bryan Phillips	436		
Independent	Pedr Staveley McMullan*	383		
Liberal Democrats	Ann I. Hovey	253		
Independent hold		Swing		

=== Pembroke St Michael ===
The boundaries were identical to those of the same ward on the previous South Pembrokeshire District Council.

Pembroke St Michael 1995
Party	Candidate	Votes	%	±%
Liberal Democrats	John Martin Allen+	407		
Labour	Clive John Collins	341		
Majority		66		
Liberal Democrats hold		Swing		

=== Pembroke Dock Central ===
The boundaries were identical to those of the same ward on the previous South Pembrokeshire District Council. The elected candidate was the retiring district councillor.

Pembroke Dock Central 1995
Party	Candidate	Votes	%	±%
Independent	Thomas Vivian Hay*	unopposed		
Independent hold		Swing		

=== Pembroke Dock Llanion ===
The boundaries were identical to those of the same ward on the previous South Pembrokeshire District Council.

Pembroke Dock Llanion 1995
Party	Candidate	Votes	%	±%
Labour	Jacqueline Rita Lawrence+	unopposed		
Labour hold		Swing		

=== Pembroke Dock Market ===
The boundaries were identical to those of the same ward on the previous South Pembrokeshire District Council.

Pembroke Dock Market 1995
Party	Candidate	Votes	%	±%
Independent	William Skyrme Rees*	362		
Liberal Democrats	Donald Thomas Esmond	214		
Majority		148		
Independent hold		Swing		

=== Pembroke Dock Pennar ===
The boundaries were identical to those of the same ward on the previous South Pembrokeshire District Council.

Pembroke Dock Pennar 1995
Party	Candidate	Votes	%	±%
Labour	Stephen James May+	681		
Independent	Brian John Hall*	592		
Majority				
Labour hold		Swing		

=== Penally ===
The boundaries were identical to those of the same ward on the previous South Pembrokeshire District Council. The elected candidate was the retiring district councillor.

Penally 1995
Party	Candidate	Votes	%	±%
Independent	Eileen Hodgson*	unopposed		
Independent hold		Swing		

=== Rudbaxton ===
The boundaries were identical to those of the same ward on the previous Preseli Pembrokeshire District Council. The elected candidate was the retiring district councillor.

Rudbaxton 1995
Party	Candidate	Votes	%	±%
Independent	David Edwin Pritchard*	unopposed		
Independent hold		Swing		

=== St David's ===
The boundaries were identical to those of the same ward on the previous Preseli Pembrokeshire District Council. The retiring district councillor was defeated.

St David's 1995
Party	Candidate	Votes	%	±%
Independent	Dilwyn Phillips	590		
Independent	James John Richards*	360		
Majority				
Independent hold		Swing		

=== St Dogmaels ===
The boundaries were identical to those of the same ward on the previous Preseli Pembrokeshire District Council.

St Dogmaels 1995
Party	Candidate	Votes	%	±%
Independent	Rev Emyr Huw Jones	365		
Labour	Robin Wilfred Day	198		
Majority				
Independent hold		Swing		

=== St Ishmael's ===
The boundaries were identical to those of the same ward on the previous Preseli Pembrokeshire District Council. The elected candidate was a retiring district councillor for Milford Hakin.

St Ishmael's 1995
Party	Candidate	Votes	%	±%
Independent	Basil Ralph Woodruff*	unopposed		
Independent hold		Swing		

=== Saundersfoot ===
The boundaries were identical to those of the same ward on the previous South Pembrokeshire District Council.

Saundersfoot 1995
Party	Candidate	Votes	%	±%
Independent	Rosemary Rebecca Hayes+*	unopposed		
Independent hold		Swing		

=== Scleddau ===
The boundaries were identical to those of the same ward on the previous Preseli Pembrokeshire District Council. The elected candidate was the retiring district councillor.

Scleddau 1995
Party	Candidate	Votes	%	±%
Independent	Alwyn Cadwallader Luke*	315		
Labour	Vaughan Barrah	190		
Majority		125		
Independent hold		Swing		

=== Solva ===
The boundaries were identical to those of the same ward on the previous Preseli Pembrokeshire District Council. The elected candidate was the retiring district councillor.

Solva 1995
Party	Candidate	Votes	%	±%
Independent	John Gordon Cawood*	742		
Independent	Kenneth Adrian Cross	79		
Majority				
Independent hold		Swing		

=== Tenby (two seats) ===
The boundaries were identical to those of the same ward on the previous South Pembrokeshire District Council.

Tenby 1995
Party	Candidate	Votes	%	±%
Independent	Michael Tracy Folland+*	1,137		
Plaid Cymru	Michael Williams*	844		
Labour	William James Rossiter	640		
Independent	Denzil Roger George Griffiths*	503		
Independent	Andrew Philip Rees	246		
Independent	James Phillips*	230		
Independent win (new seat)				
Plaid Cymru win (new seat)				

=== The Havens ===
The boundaries were identical to those of the same ward on the previous Preseli Pembrokeshire District Council.

The Havens 1995
Party	Candidate	Votes	%	±%
Independent	Eric George Sanders Mock	300		
Independent	Christopher J. Farr	191		
Independent hold		Swing		

=== Wiston ===
The boundaries were identical to those of the same ward on the previous Preseli Pembrokeshire District Council.

Wiston 1995
Party	Candidate	Votes	%	±%
Independent	Peter Edmund Masterson	587		
Independent	Christopher Arthur Olding	108		
Majority		479		
Independent hold		Swing		
