= 1991 South Pembrokeshire District Council election =

1991 Welsh local government election

An election to South Pembrokeshire District Council was held in May 1991. The Independents maintained a majority. It was preceded by the 1987 election and followed by the 1995 Pembrokeshire County Council election (following re-organization of local government). On the same day there were elections to the other district local authorities and community councils in Wales.

== Results by ward ==
=== Amroth (one seat) ===
Amroth 1991
Party	Candidate	Votes	%	±%
Independent	Alan Walter Edwards*	unopposed		
Independent hold		Swing		

=== Begelly (one seat) ===
Begelly 1991
Party	Candidate	Votes	%	±%
Independent	A.Llewellyn*	unopposed		
Independent hold		Swing		

=== Carew (one seat) ===
Carew 1991
Party	Candidate	Votes	%	±%
Independent	Norman Richard Parry*	unopposed		
Independent hold		Swing		

=== East Williamston (one seat) ===
East Williamston 1991
Party	Candidate	Votes	%	±%
Independent	David Gordon Williams*	unopposed		
Independent hold		Swing		

=== Hundleton (one seat) ===
Hundleton 1991
Party	Candidate	Votes	%	±%
Independent	John Seymour Allen-Mierhouse*	unopposed		
Independent hold		Swing		

=== Lampeter Velfrey (one seat) ===
Lampeter Velfrey 1991
Party	Candidate	Votes	%	±%
Independent	D.B. Davies*	unopposed		
Independent hold		Swing		

=== Lamphey (one seat) ===
Lamphey 1991
Party	Candidate	Votes	%	±%
Independent	R. Phillips	347	65.6	
Labour	V. Roberts	182	34.4	
Majority		165	31.2	
Independent hold		Swing		

=== Manorbier (one seat) ===
Manorbier 1991
Party	Candidate	Votes	%	±%
Plaid Cymru	David Morgan	295	50.8	
Independent	W. Nicholas	286	49.2	
Majority		9	1.6	
Independent hold		Swing		

=== Martletwy (one seat) ===
Martletwy 1991
Party	Candidate	Votes	%	±%
Independent	Thomas Elwyn James*	unopposed		
Independent hold		Swing		

=== Narberth Rural (one seat) ===
Narberth Rural 1991
Party	Candidate	Votes	%	±%
Independent	William Richard Colin Davies*	unopposed		
Independent hold		Swing		

=== Narberth Urban (one seat) ===
Narberth Urban 1991
Party	Candidate	Votes	%	±%
Independent	Thomas David Watkins*	Unopposed	N/A	N/A
Independent hold				

=== Pembroke St Mary (two seats) ===
Pembroke St Mary 1991
Party	Candidate	Votes	%	±%
Independent	E.L.J. Morgan*	383		
Independent	P.S. McMullen	332		
Independent	V. McInally*	283		
Labour	F.J. Hession	273		
Independent hold		Swing		
Independent hold		Swing		

=== Pembroke St Michael (two seats) ===
Pembroke St Michael 1991
Party	Candidate	Votes	%	±%
Independent	G.A. Hay-Watkins	433		
Independent	C.J. Collins*	408		
Independent	J.C. Robinson	213		
Independent win (new seat)				
Independent win (new seat)				

=== Pembroke Dock Central (one seat) ===
Pembroke Dock Central 1991
Party	Candidate	Votes	%	±%
Independent	Thomas Vivian Hay*	unopposed		
Independent hold		Swing		

=== Pembroke Dock Llanion (two seats) ===
Pembroke Dock Llanion 1991
Party	Candidate	Votes	%	±%
Independent	Dillwyn Morgan Davies*	359		
Independent	Walford John Davies	330		
Labour	Charles Howard Thomas*	326		
Independent hold		Swing		
Independent gain from Labour		Swing		

=== Pembroke Dock Market (one seat) ===
Pembroke Dock Market 1991
Party	Candidate	Votes	%	±%
Independent	William Skyrme Rees*	unopposed		
Independent hold		Swing		

=== Pembroke Dock Pennar (two seats) ===
Pembroke Dock Pennar 1991
Party	Candidate	Votes	%	±%
Independent	B.J. Hall*	unopposed		
Labour	S.J.H. Roch	unopposed		
Independent hold		Swing		
Labour gain from Liberal Democrats		Swing		

=== Penally (one seat) ===
Penally 1991
Party	Candidate	Votes	%	±%
Independent	Eileen Hodgson*	unopposed		
Majority				
Independent hold		Swing		

=== Saundersfoot (two seats) ===
Saundersfoot 1991
Party	Candidate	Votes	%	±%
Independent	Rosemary Rebecca Hayes*	773		
Independent	William Terrence Cleevely*	627		
Independent	Lawrence William James Duncan	566		
Independent hold		Swing		
Independent hold		Swing		

=== Stackpole (one seat) ===
Stackpole 1991
Party	Candidate	Votes	%	±%
Independent	Andrew Stenson*	unopposed		
Independent hold		Swing		

=== Tenby (four seats) ===
Tenby 1991
Party	Candidate	Votes	%	±%
Independent	Michael Tracy Folland	991		
Plaid Cymru	Michael Williams*	894		
Independent	Denzil Roger George Griffiths*	769		
Independent	James Phillips	675		
Independent	L.R. Day	348		
Independent hold		Swing		
Plaid Cymru hold		Swing		
Independent hold		Swing		
Independent hold		Swing		
