= Llanfair-Nant-Gwyn =

Parish in Pembrokeshire, Wales

Coordinates: 52.005°N 4.675°W

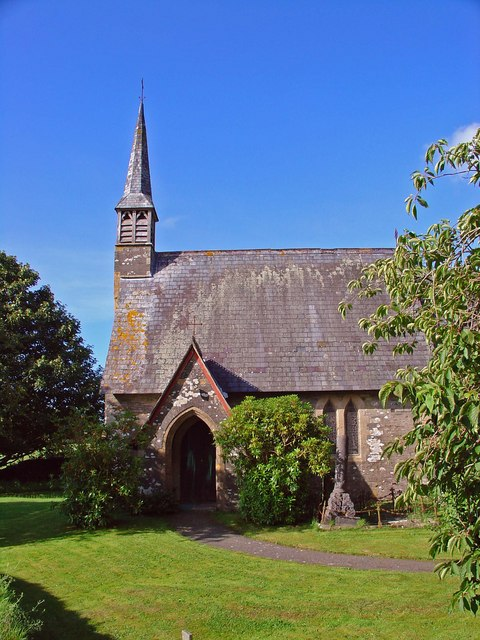
- St Mary's Church

- Location within Pembrokeshire
- OS grid reference: SN165375
- Community: Eglwyswrw
- Principal area: Pembrokeshire
- Country: Wales
- Sovereign state: United Kingdom
- Post town: Boncath
- Postcode district: SA37
- Dialling code: 01239
- Police: Dyfed-Powys
- Fire: Mid and West Wales
- Ambulance: Welsh
- UK Parliament: Preseli Pembrokeshire
- Senedd Cymru – Welsh Parliament: Preseli Pembrokeshire

Llanfair-Nant-Gwyn is a hamlet and small parish in the community of Eglwyswrw, north Pembrokeshire, Wales. It is a rural parish with few dwellings and was in the ancient Hundred of Cemais.

== Name ==
An English translation of Llanfair-Nant-Gwyn would be "St Mary's church of the white stream". According to Lewis, the parish derives its name "from the dedication of its church to St.Mary, and its distinguishing adjunct probably from the abundance of white quartz stones scattered over the lands and in the bed of a brook by which it is watered".

== History ==
The parish (as Cap. Nantgwin) appears on a 1578 parish map of Pembrokeshire. Until about 1790 the parish was combined with that of Eglwyswen and was 1,400 acres (570 ha). When it became an independent parish it covered 1,694 acres (686 ha). In 1833 there were 237 inhabitants in the parish and in 1929 the population was 190.

== Worship ==
R. J. Withers designed the parish church when it was rebuilt in 1855; it has a wooden, slated spire and is dedicated to St Mary.

Ebenezer Baptist Chapel was established at Ffynnonwen in 1768.

== Nant Gwyn and St Meigan ==
The stream that gives its name to the parish rises on the southern slope of Rhoshill. St Meigan is invoked in several place names nearby, including Dyffryn Meigan (Meigan Valley), Pistyll Meigan (Meigan Falls), Bro Meigan (Meigan Place) and Penlanfeigan (top of Meigan's church—though perhaps not a church but a holy place, and marked as Llan-Feigan Uchaf on an old parish map). The name of the stream running from Meigan Wells, past Pant-y-Deri Farm, to join the River Nevern shortly before Nant Gwyn is not named on modern maps, but George Owen (1594) describes the two streams thus: "the Nevern...

...receaveth from the north-east the brooke called yr Amelh whose spring is above St. Meigans, whence it runneth right west and neere Nantgwyn Chappel, receaveth the cleere rillet, called Nant-Gwyn, then hastening toward Jordan's Mill from the south-east..."

St Meigan is linked to a fair in Eglwyswrw to the west, and Pant-y-Deri hosted a rock concert called Meigan's Fayre in the 1970s. The mill is still marked on modern maps, and there was another marked on the old parish map a short way upstream on the Nevern. Meigan Wells is the site of a recycling company.

== Bibliography ==
- Lloyd, T., Orbach, J., Scourfield, R. (2004). Pembrokeshire. Yale University Press. ISBN 0300101783.
