= 1983 South Pembrokeshire District Council election =

1983 Welsh local government election

An election to South Pembrokeshire District Council was held in May 1983. An Independent majority was maintained. It was preceded by the 1979 election and followed by the 1987 election. On the same day there were elections to the other local authorities and community councils in Wales.

== Results ==
=== Amroth (one seat) ===
Amroth 1983
Party	Candidate	Votes	%	±%
Independent	Alan Walter Edwards*	unopposed		
Independent hold		Swing		

=== Angle (one seat) ===
Angle 1983
Party	Candidate	Votes	%	±%
Independent	John Seymour Allen-Mierhouse*	214	73.3	
Independent	R. Pointon	78	26.7	
Majority			46.6	
Independent hold		Swing		

=== Begelly (one seat) ===
Begelly 1983
Party	Candidate	Votes	%	±%
Independent	E.B. Cole*	497		
Independent	Thomas John Price	128		
Majority				
Independent hold		Swing		

=== Carew (one seat) ===
Carew 1983
Party	Candidate	Votes	%	±%
Independent	S.W. Hallett*	unopposed		
Independent hold		Swing		

=== Cosheston(one seat) ===
Cosheston 1983
Party	Candidate	Votes	%	±%
Independent	I.M. White*	651		
Independent	Dilys Tice	66		
Majority				
Independent hold		Swing		

=== Hundleton (one seat) ===
Hundleton 1983
Party	Candidate	Votes	%	±%
Independent	A.G.R. Shepperd*	unopposed		
Independent hold		Swing		

=== Lampeter Velfrey (one seat) ===
Lampeter Velfrey 1983
Party	Candidate	Votes	%	±%
Independent	D.B. Davies*	unopposed		
Independent hold		Swing		

=== Manorbier (one seat) ===
Manorbier 1983
Party	Candidate	Votes	%	±%
Independent	W.R. Douglas*	unopposed		
Independent hold		Swing		

=== Martletwy (one seat) ===
Martletwy 1983
Party	Candidate	Votes	%	±%
Independent	Thomas Elwyn James*	unopposed		
Independent hold		Swing		

=== Narberth North / South (one seat) ===
Narberth North / South 1983
Party	Candidate	Votes	%	±%
Independent	William Richard Colin Davies*	556		
Labour	Joan Asby	181		
Majority				
Independent hold		Swing		

=== Narberth Urban (one seat) ===
Narberth Urban 1983
Party	Candidate	Votes	%	±%
Independent	J.E. Feetham*	345		
Labour	Thomas David Watkins	213		
Majority		132		
Independent hold		Swing		

=== Pembroke Central (two seats) ===
Pembroke Central 1983
Party	Candidate	Votes	%	±%
Independent	Walford John Davies*	unopposed		
Independent	Thomas Vivian Hay*	unopposed		
Independent hold		Swing		
Independent hold		Swing		

=== Pembroke East (three seats) ===
Pembroke East 1983
Party	Candidate	Votes	%	±%
Independent	I.C.J. Jenkins*	1,040		
Independent	D.H. Lloyd	599		
Independent	E.L.J. Morgan*	561		
Independent	Mrs R.K. Thomas	548		
Independent hold		Swing		
Independent hold		Swing		
Independent hold		Swing		

=== Pembroke Llanion (two seats) ===
Pembroke Llanion 1983
Party	Candidate	Votes	%	±%
Independent	Dillwyn Morgan Davies*	unopposed		
Labour	Charles Howard Thomas*	unopposed		
Independent hold		Swing		
Labour hold		Swing		

=== Pembroke Market (two seats) ===
Pembroke Market 1983
Party	Candidate	Votes	%	±%
Labour	M.J. Canley	unopposed		
Independent	William Skyrme Rees*	unopposed		
Labour hold		Swing		
Independent hold		Swing		

=== Pembroke Pennar (two seats) ===
Pembroke Pennar 1983
Party	Candidate	Votes	%	±%
Labour	S.J.H. Roch*	664		
Labour	S. John	461		
Independent	Rev D.C. Hughes	363		
Independent	E.V. Gibby	121		
Labour hold		Swing		
Labour hold		Swing		

=== Penally (one seat) ===
Penally 1983
Party	Candidate	Votes	%	±%
Independent	Eileen Hodgson	291		
Independent	T.A.A. Jenkins	123		
Independent	Norman Richard Parry	86		
Majority				
Independent hold		Swing		

=== St Issels (two seats) ===
St Issels 1983
Party	Candidate	Votes	%	±%
Independent	B.W. Howells*	845		
Independent	Rosemary Rebecca Hayes	576		
Independent	L.W.J. Duncan	566		
Independent	G.C. Rowe*	500		
Independent hold		Swing		
Independent hold		Swing		

=== Tenby North (two seats) ===
Tenby North 1983
Party	Candidate	Votes	%	±%
Independent	Mrs I. Davies*	unopposed		
Independent	Denzil Roger George Griffiths*	unopposed		
Independent hold		Swing		
Independent hold		Swing		

=== Tenby South (two seats) ===
Tenby South 1983
Party	Candidate	Votes	%	±%
Independent	Michael Williams*	506		
Independent	B.M. Hart	281		
Independent	T.G. Phillips	179		
Independent	C.J. Evans	106		
Independent hold		Swing		
Independent hold		Swing		
