= 1979 South Pembrokeshire District Council election =

1979 Welsh local government election

An election to South Pembrokeshire District Council was held in May 1979. An Independent majority was maintained. It was preceded by the 1976 election and followed by the 1983 election. On the same day there was a United Kingdom general election and were elections to the other district local authorities and community councils in Wales.

== Results ==
=== Amroth (one seat) ===
Amroth 1979
Party	Candidate	Votes	%	±%
Independent	Alan Walter Edwards*	unopposed		
Independent hold		Swing		

=== Angle (one seat) ===
Angle 1979
Party	Candidate	Votes	%	±%
Independent	John Seymour Allen-Mierhouse*	178		
Independent	R. Pointon	83		
Majority		95		
Turnout			87.4	
Independent hold		Swing		

=== Begelly (one seat) ===
Begelly 1979
Party	Candidate	Votes	%	±%
Independent	E.B. Cole	284	47.3	
Independent	W. Dovey	100	16.7	
Independent	W. Cray	97	16.2	
Independent	T. Evans	63	10.5	
Independent	E. Lawrence	30	5.0	
Independent	L. Duncan	26	4.3	
Majority			30.6	
Turnout			56.7	−13.3
Independent hold		Swing		

=== Carew (one seat) ===
Carew 1979
Party	Candidate	Votes	%	±%
Independent	S.W. Hallett*	unopposed		
Independent hold		Swing		

=== Cosheston (one seat) ===
Cosheston 1979
Party	Candidate	Votes	%	±%
Independent	W. Phillips*	unopposed		
Independent hold		Swing		

=== Hundleton (one seat) ===
Hundleton 1979
Party	Candidate	Votes	%	±%
Independent	A.G.R. Shepperd*	unopposed		
Independent hold		Swing		

=== Lampeter Velfrey (one seat) ===
Lampeter Velfrey 1979
Party	Candidate	Votes	%	±%
Independent	T. Griffiths*	unopposed		
Independent hold		Swing		

=== Maenclochog (one seat) ===
Maenclochog 1979
Party	Candidate	Votes	%	±%
Independent	N. Drew*	500	73.6	+26.3
Independent	L. May	179	26.4	
Majority			47.2	
Turnout			83.0	+4.6
Independent hold		Swing		

=== Manorbier (one seat) ===
Manorbier 1979
Party	Candidate	Votes	%	±%
Independent	H. Coates	unopposed		
Independent hold		Swing		

=== Martletwy and Slebech (one seat) ===
Martletwy and Slebech 1979
Party	Candidate	Votes	%	±%
Independent	Thomas Elwyn James*	405	76.6	
Independent	B. Johnson	124	23.4	
Majority			53.2	
Turnout			85.7	−26.2
Independent hold		Swing		

=== Narberth North / South (one seat) ===
Narberth North / South 1979
Party	Candidate	Votes	%	±%
Independent	William Richard Colin Davies*	607	69.8	
Independent	Joan Asby	263	30.2	
Majority			39.5	
Turnout			86.1	
Independent hold		Swing		

=== Narberth Urban (one seat) ===
Narberth Urban 1979
Party	Candidate	Votes	%	±%
Independent	J.E. Feetham*	424	60.1	−3.8
Independent	E. Owen	281	39.9	
Majority			20.2	−7.4
Turnout			83.4	+6.5
Independent hold		Swing		

=== Pembroke Central (two seats) ===
Pembroke Central 1979
Party	Candidate	Votes	%	±%
Independent	Walford John Davies	651		
Independent	T.V. Hay*	557		
Independent	J. Williams*	315		
Turnout				
Independent hold		Swing		
Independent hold		Swing		

=== Pembroke East (three seats) ===
Pembroke East 1979
Party	Candidate	Votes	%	±%
Independent	M. Mathias*	1,615		
Independent	I.C.J. Jenkins	1,170		
Independent	E. Wrench*	1,120		
Independent	E.L.J. Morgan*	1,064		
Independent	P. Peachey	979		
Turnout				
Independent hold		Swing		
Independent hold		Swing		
Independent hold		Swing		

=== Pembroke Llanion (two seats) ===
Pembroke Llanion 1979
Party	Candidate	Votes	%	±%
Independent	D.M. Davies	925		
Labour	Charles Howard Thomas*	699		
Independent	C. Sandell	523		
Independent	J. Gough	491		
Independent	S. Peters	230		
Turnout				
Independent hold		Swing		
Labour hold		Swing		

=== Pembroke Market (two seats) ===
Pembroke Market 1979
Party	Candidate	Votes	%	±%
Independent	F. Bearne*	unopposed		
Independent	W. Rees	unopposed		
Independent hold		Swing		
Independent hold		Swing		

=== Pembroke Pennar (two seats) ===
Pembroke Pennar 1979
Party	Candidate	Votes	%	±%
Independent	R. Forster*	unopposed		
Independent	K. Phillips*	unopposed		
Independent hold		Swing		
Independent hold		Swing		

=== Penally (one seat) ===
Penally 1979
Party	Candidate	Votes	%	±%
Independent	W. Lawrence	unopposed		
Independent hold		Swing		

=== St Issels (two seats) ===
St Issels 1979
Party	Candidate	Votes	%	±%
Independent	G.C. Rowe	1,127		
Independent	B. Howells	751		
Independent	Lawrence William James Duncan*	707		
Independent	E. Lawrence	679		
Independent	B. Williams*	456		
Turnout				
Independent hold		Swing		
Independent hold		Swing		

=== Tenby North (two seats) ===
Tenby North 1979
Party	Candidate	Votes	%	±%
Independent	Mrs I. Davies*	unopposed		
Independent	Denzil Roger George Griffiths*	unopposed		
Turnout				
Independent hold		Swing		
Independent hold		Swing		

=== Tenby South (two seats) ===
Tenby South 1976
Party	Candidate	Votes	%	±%
Independent	K. Batchelor	693		
Independent	Michael Williams	598		
Independent	T.G. Phillips*	527		
Turnout				
Independent hold		Swing		
Independent hold		Swing		
