= Narberth Rural District =

History of Pembrokeshire

Coordinates: 51.80240°N 4.74288°W

- Rural district
- Population
  - 1901: 11,037
  - 1971: 10,095
- History
  - Created: 28 December 1894
  - Abolished: 31 March 1974
  - Succeeded by: South Pembrokeshire
  - HQ: Narberth
- Contained within
  - County Council: Pembrokeshire

Narberth Rural District was a rural district in the administrative county of Pembrokeshire, Wales from 1894 to 1974, covering an area in the east of the county.

== Origins ==
The district had its origins in the Narberth Poor Law Union, which had been created in 1837, covering Narberth itself and a large surrounding rural area. A workhouse to serve the union was built about a mile south of the town of Narberth in 1838–9, in the parish of Narberth South. The building later became known as Allenbank. In 1872 sanitary districts were established, giving public health and local government responsibilities to the existing boards of guardians for the rural parts of their poor law unions that were not already covered by an urban authority. As there were no urban authorities within the Narberth Poor Law Union, the Narberth Rural Sanitary District covered the same area.

Under the Local Government Act 1894, rural sanitary districts became rural districts from 28 December 1894.

The town of Narberth was removed from Narberth Rural District in 1902 to become its own urban district.

== Premises ==
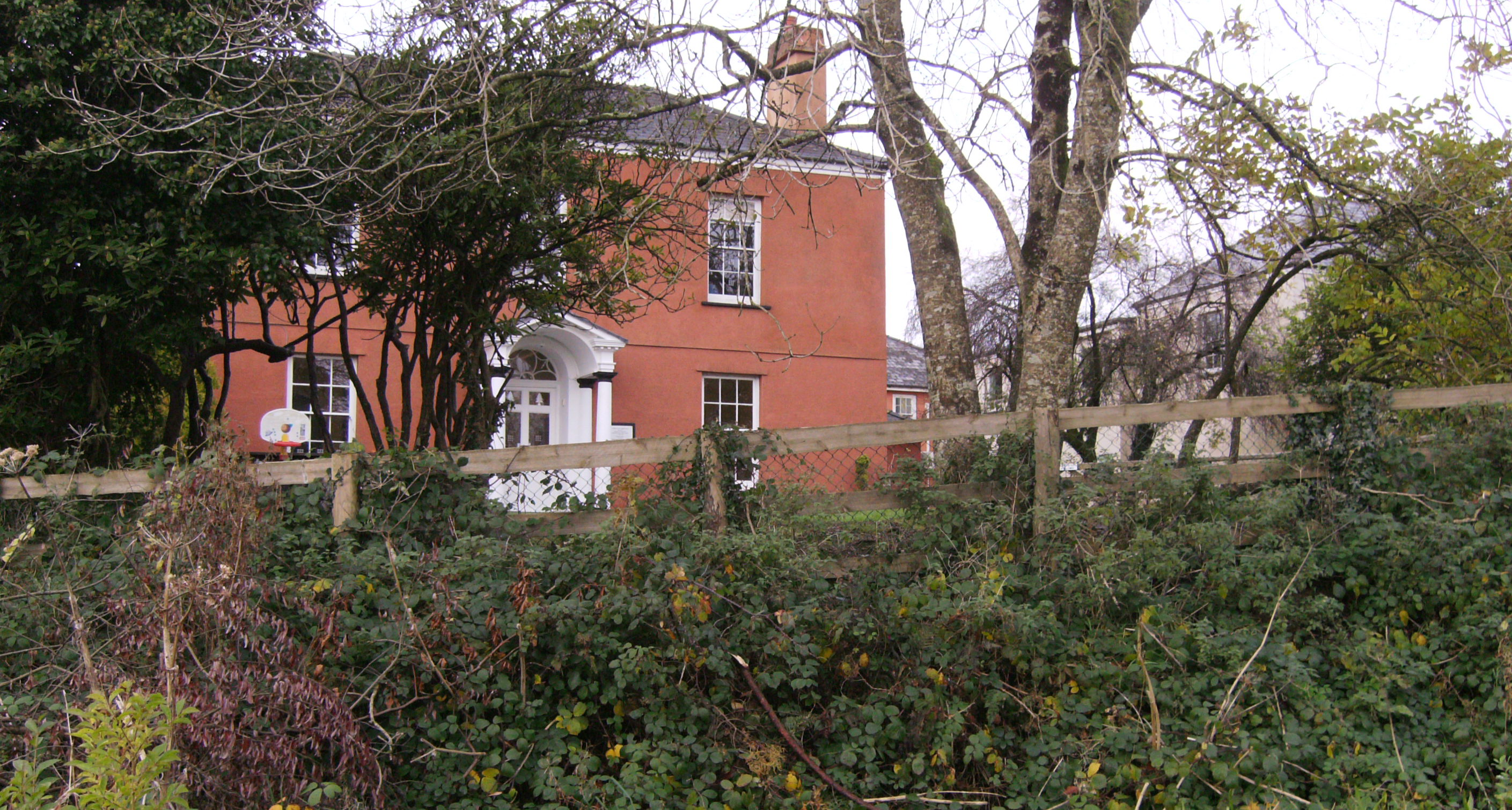
Bloomfield House, Narberth: Council's headquarters 1953–1974

In its early years the council was based at the Allenbank workhouse. In 1953 the council bought Bloomfield House on Northfield Road in Narberth to serve as its headquarters, and was based there until the council's abolition in 1974.

== Abolition ==
Narberth Rural District was abolished under the Local Government Act 1972, merging with other nearby districts to become South Pembrokeshire.
