= 1973 South Pembrokeshire District Council election =

1973 Welsh local government election

The inaugural election to South Pembrokeshire District Council was held in April 1973. Independent candidates won nearly all the seats. It was followed by the 1976 election. On the same day there were elections to the other District local authorities and community councils in Wales.

== Results ==
=== Amroth (one seat) ===
Amroth 1973
| Party | Candidate | Votes | % | ±% |
|---|---|---|---|---|
| Independent | Alan Walter Edwards | 284 | 59.3 | |
| Independent | I. Howell | 195 | 40.7 | |
| Majority | | | 18.6 | |
| Turnout | | | 67.4 | |
| Independent win (new seat) | | | | |

=== Angle (one seat) ===
Angle 1973
| Party | Candidate | Votes | % | ±% |
|---|---|---|---|---|
| Independent | I. Wisbey | 195 | 72.2 | |
| Independent | C. Jenkins | 75 | 27.8 | |
| Majority | | | 44.4 | |
| Turnout | | | 86.8 | |
| Independent win (new seat) | | | | |

=== Begelly (one seat) ===
Begelly 1973
| Party | Candidate | Votes | % | ±% |
|---|---|---|---|---|
| Independent | H. John | 283 | 40.6 | |
| Independent | T. Jones | 231 | 33.1 | |
| Independent | J. Northeast | 183 | 26.3 | |
| Majority | | | 7.5 | |
| Turnout | | | 67.1 | |
| Independent win (new seat) | | | | |

=== Carew (one seat) ===
Carew 1973
| Party | Candidate | Votes | % | ±% |
|---|---|---|---|---|
| Independent | S.W. Hallett | unopposed | | |
| Independent win (new seat) | | | | |

=== Cosheston (one seat) ===
Cosheston 1973
| Party | Candidate | Votes | % | ±% |
|---|---|---|---|---|
| Independent | W. Phillips | 408 | 62.3 | |
| Independent | N. Phelps | 247 | 37.7 | |
| Majority | | | 24.6 | |
| Turnout | | | 65.4 | |
| Independent win (new seat) | | | | |

=== Hundleton (one seat) ===
Hundleton 1973
| Party | Candidate | Votes | % | ±% |
|---|---|---|---|---|
| Independent | J. Bennion | 249 | 40.6 | |
| Independent | A.G.R. Shepperd | 232 | 37.8 | |
| Independent | W. Cox | 132 | 21.5 | |
| Majority | | 17 | 2.8 | |
| Turnout | | | | |
| Independent win (new seat) | | | | |

=== Lampeter Velfrey (one seat) ===
Lampeter Velfrey 1973
| Party | Candidate | Votes | % | ±% |
|---|---|---|---|---|
| Independent | T. Griffiths | unopposed | | |
| Independent win (new seat) | | | | |

=== Maenclochog (one seat) ===
Maenclochog 1973
| Party | Candidate | Votes | % | ±% |
|---|---|---|---|---|
| Independent | J. Steadman | 313 | 58.3 | |
| Plaid Cymru | A. John | 224 | 41.7 | |
| Majority | | | 16.6 | |
| Turnout | | | 70.2 | |
| Independent win (new seat) | | | | |

=== Manorbier (one seat) ===
Manorbier 1973
| Party | Candidate | Votes | % | ±% |
|---|---|---|---|---|
| Independent | H. Butler | 155 | 31.4 | |
| Independent | D. Evans | 144 | 29.1 | |
| Independent | J. Reid | 100 | 20.2 | |
| Independent | R. Thomas | 95 | 19.2 | |
| Majority | | | 2.2 | |
| Turnout | | | 53.9 | |
| Independent win (new seat) | | | | |

=== Martletwy and Slebech (one seat) ===
Martletwy and Slebech 1973
| Party | Candidate | Votes | % | ±% |
|---|---|---|---|---|
| Independent | Thomas Elwyn James | 262 | 62.5 | |
| Independent | M. Phillips | 157 | 37.5 | |
| Majority | | | 25.1 | |
| Turnout | | | | |
| Independent win (new seat) | | | | |

=== Narberth North / South (one seat) ===
Narberth North / South 1973
| Party | Candidate | Votes | % | ±% |
|---|---|---|---|---|
| Independent | William Richard Colin Davies | 294 | 50.3 | |
| Independent | W. Evans | 290 | 49.7 | |
| Majority | | 4 | 0.6 | |
| Turnout | | | 53.4 | |
| Independent win (new seat) | | | | |

=== Narberth Urban (one seat) ===
Narberth Urban 1973
| Party | Candidate | Votes | % | ±% |
|---|---|---|---|---|
| Independent | J.E. Feetham | unopposed | | |
| Independent win (new seat) | | | | |

=== Pembroke Central (two seats) ===
Pembroke Central 1973
| Party | Candidate | Votes | % | ±% |
|---|---|---|---|---|
| Independent | J. Williams | 391 | | |
| Independent | Walford John Davies | 270 | | |
| Independent | S Peters | 155 | | |
| Turnout | | | | |
| Independent win (new seat) | | | | |
| Independent win (new seat) | | | | |

=== Pembroke East (three seats) ===
Pembroke East 1973
| Party | Candidate | Votes | % | ±% |
|---|---|---|---|---|
| Independent | E. Wrench | 774 | | |
| Independent | E.L.J. Morgan | 608 | | |
| Independent | M. Mathias | 600 | | |
| Independent | J. Woodhouse | 537 | | |
| Independent | D. Davies | 505 | | |
| Independent | E. Gibby | 141 | | |
| Turnout | | | | |
| Independent win (new seat) | | | | |
| Independent win (new seat) | | | | |
| Independent win (new seat) | | | | |

=== Pembroke Llanion (two seats) ===
Pembroke Llanion 1973
| Party | Candidate | Votes | % | ±% |
|---|---|---|---|---|
| Independent | A. Dureau | 393 | | |
| Labour | Charles Howard Thomas | 350 | | |
| Independent | P. Peachey | 131 | | |
| Turnout | | | | |
| Independent win (new seat) | | | | |
| Labour win (new seat) | | | | |

=== Pembroke Market (two seats) ===
Pembroke Market 1973
| Party | Candidate | Votes | % | ±% |
|---|---|---|---|---|
| Independent | J. Owen | 412 | | |
| Independent | D. Stephens | 197 | | |
| Independent | D. Kingdom | 193 | | |
| Turnout | | | | |
| Independent win (new seat) | | | | |
| Independent win (new seat) | | | | |

=== Pembroke Pennar (two seats) ===
Pembroke Pennar 1973
| Party | Candidate | Votes | % | ±% |
|---|---|---|---|---|
| Independent | A. Nicholls | unopposed | | |
| Independent | B. Phillips | unopposed | | |
| Independent win (new seat) | | | | |
| Independent win (new seat) | | | | |

=== Penally (one seat) ===
Penally 1973
| Party | Candidate | Votes | % | ±% |
|---|---|---|---|---|
| Independent | W. Phillips | unopposed | | |
| Independent win (new seat) | | | | |

=== St Issels (two seats) ===
St Issels 1973
| Party | Candidate | Votes | % | ±% |
|---|---|---|---|---|
| Independent | G. Llewellyn | 868 | | |
| Independent | B. Williams | 708 | | |
| Independent | I. Bell | 318 | | |
| Turnout | | | | |
| Independent win (new seat) | | | | |
| Independent win (new seat) | | | | |

=== Tenby North (two seats) ===
Tenby North 1973
| Party | Candidate | Votes | % | ±% |
|---|---|---|---|---|
| Independent | Mrs I. Davies | 645 | | |
| Plaid Cymru | Michael Williams | 457 | | |
| Independent | Denzil Roger George Griffiths | 396 | | |
| Turnout | | | | |
| Independent win (new seat) | | | | |
| Plaid Cymru win (new seat) | | | | |

=== Tenby South (two seats) ===
Tenby South 1973
| Party | Candidate | Votes | % | ±% |
|---|---|---|---|---|
| Independent | C.H Evans | 295 | | |
| Independent | H.A. Mace | 254 | | |
| Independent | T.G. Phillips | 233 | | |
| Turnout | | | | |
| Independent win (new seat) | | | | |
| Independent win (new seat) | | | | |
