= Crymych (electoral ward) =

Electoral ward in Pembrokeshire, Wales

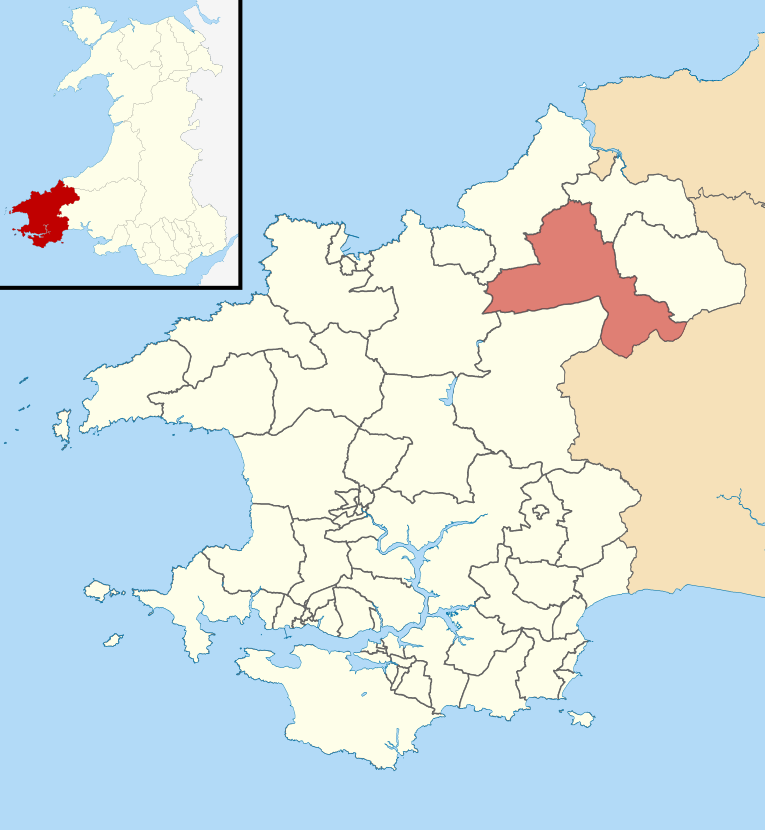
Location of the Crymych ward within Pembrokeshire

Crymych is an electoral ward in Pembrokeshire, Wales. The ward consists of the communities of Crymych and Eglwyswrw.

A ward of Pembrokeshire County Council since 1995 it was previously a ward of the former Preseli Pembrokeshire District Council. The ward population at the 2011 census was 2,463.

Following a 2021 ward boundary review, Eglwyswrw was paired with Cilgerran to form a Cilgerran and Eglwyswrw ward, while Mynachlogddu was paired with Crymych to form a new ward of Crymych and Mynachlog-ddu, effective from the 2022 Pembrokeshire County Council election.

== Elections ==
=== 2017 ===
Described as the "biggest shock of the day", Plaid Cymru beat the deputy leader of Pembrokeshire Council, Keith Lewis.

Pembrokeshire County Council election, 4 May 2017
Party	Candidate	Votes	%	±%
Plaid Cymru	Chris Tomos	616	54.4	
Independent	Keith Lewis *	516	45.6	
Plaid Cymru gain from Independent		Swing		

* = sitting councillor prior to the election

== See also ==
- List of electoral wards in Pembrokeshire
