= 1976 South Pembrokeshire District Council election =

1976 Welsh local government election

An election to South Pembrokeshire District Council was held in May 1976. An Independent majority was maintained. It was preceded by the 1973 election and followed by the 1979 election. On the same day there were elections to the other district local authorities and community councils in Wales.

== Results ==
=== Amroth (one seat) ===
Amroth 1976
| Party | Candidate | Votes | % | ±% |
|---|---|---|---|---|
| Independent | Alan Walter Edwards* | 507 | 93.2 | |
| Independent | A. Hellings | 37 | 6.8 | |
| Majority | | | 86.4 | |
| Turnout | | | 76.3 | |
| Independent hold | | Swing | | |

=== Angle (one seat) ===
Angle 1976
| Party | Candidate | Votes | % | ±% |
|---|---|---|---|---|
| Independent | D. Rees | unopposed | | |
| Independent hold | | Swing | | |

=== Begelly (one seat) ===
Begelly 1976
| Party | Candidate | Votes | % | ±% |
|---|---|---|---|---|
| Independent | H. John* | 532 | 73.1 | |
| Independent | E. Jones | 196 | 26.9 | |
| Majority | | | 46.2 | |
| Turnout | | | 70.0 | +2.9 |
| Independent hold | | Swing | | |

=== Carew (one seat) ===
Carew 1976
| Party | Candidate | Votes | % | ±% |
|---|---|---|---|---|
| Independent | S.W. Hallett* | unopposed | | |
| Independent hold | | Swing | | |

=== Cosheston (one seat) ===
Cosheston 1976
| Party | Candidate | Votes | % | ±% |
|---|---|---|---|---|
| Independent | W. Phillips* | unopposed | | |
| Independent hold | | Swing | | |

=== Hundleton (one seat) ===
Hundleton 1976
| Party | Candidate | Votes | % | ±% |
|---|---|---|---|---|
| Independent | A.G.R. Shepperd | 313 | | |
| Independent | J. Bennion* | 212 | | |
| Majority | | 101 | | |
| Turnout | | | | |
| Independent hold | | Swing | | |

=== Lampeter Velfrey (one seat) ===
Lampeter Velfrey 1976
| Party | Candidate | Votes | % | ±% |
|---|---|---|---|---|
| Independent | T. Griffiths* | 499 | 86.2 | |
| Plaid Cymru | J. Price | 80 | 13.8 | |
| Majority | | 419 | 72.4 | |
| Turnout | | | 66.0 | |
| Independent hold | | Swing | | |

=== Maenclochog (one seat) ===
Maenclochog 1976
| Party | Candidate | Votes | % | ±% |
|---|---|---|---|---|
| Independent | Norma Drew | 284 | 47.3 | |
| Independent | J. Steadman* | 168 | 28.0 | −30.3 |
| Independent | R. Edwards | 83 | 13.8 | |
| Independent | B. Rees | 66 | 11.0 | |
| Majority | | | 19.3 | |
| Turnout | | | 78.4 | +8.2 |
| Independent hold | | Swing | | |

=== Manorbier (one seat) ===
Manorbier 1976
| Party | Candidate | Votes | % | ±% |
|---|---|---|---|---|
| Independent | M. Collis | 255 | | |
| Independent | H. Butler* | 206 | | |
| Majority | | | 34.1 | |
| Turnout | | | 27.7 | −26.2 |
| Independent hold | | Swing | | |

=== Martletwy and Slebech (one seat) ===
Martletwy and Slebech 1976
| Party | Candidate | Votes | % | ±% |
|---|---|---|---|---|
| Independent | Thomas Elwyn James* | unopposed | | |
| Independent hold | | Swing | | |

=== Narberth North / South (one seat) ===
Narberth North / South 1976
| Party | Candidate | Votes | % | ±% |
|---|---|---|---|---|
| Independent | William Richard Colin Davies* | unopposed | | |
| Independent hold | | Swing | | |

=== Narberth Urban (one seat) ===
Narberth Urban 1976
| Party | Candidate | Votes | % | ±% |
|---|---|---|---|---|
| Independent | J.E. Feetham* | 403 | 63.9 | |
| Plaid Cymru | D. Osmond | 228 | 36.1 | |
| Majority | | | 27.8 | |
| Turnout | | | 76.9 | |
| Independent hold | | Swing | | |

=== Pembroke Central (two seats) ===
Pembroke Central 1976
| Party | Candidate | Votes | % | ±% |
|---|---|---|---|---|
| Independent | J. Williams* | 303 | | |
| Independent | T.V. Hay | 303 | | |
| Independent | Walford John Davies* | 297 | | |
| Independent | W. Rees | 210 | | |
| Turnout | | | | |
| Independent hold | | Swing | | |
| Independent hold | | Swing | | |

=== Pembroke East (three seats) ===
Pembroke East 1976
| Party | Candidate | Votes | % | ±% |
|---|---|---|---|---|
| Independent | M. Mathias* | 795 | | |
| Independent | E. Wrench* | 736 | | |
| Independent | E.L.J. Morgan* | 714 | | |
| Independent | D. Davies | 671 | | |
| Independent | R. Kane | 588 | | |
| Independent | P. Peachey | 477 | | |
| Turnout | | | | |
| Independent hold | | Swing | | |
| Independent hold | | Swing | | |
| Independent hold | | Swing | | |

=== Pembroke Llanion (two seats) ===
Pembroke Llanion 1976
| Party | Candidate | Votes | % | ±% |
|---|---|---|---|---|
| Independent | A. Dureau* | unopposed | | |
| Labour | Charles Howard Thomas* | unopposed | | |
| Turnout | | | | |
| Independent hold | | Swing | | |
| Labour hold | | Swing | | |

=== Pembroke Market (two seats) ===
Pembroke Market 1976
| Party | Candidate | Votes | % | ±% |
|---|---|---|---|---|
| Independent | F. Bearne | 373 | | |
| Independent | J. Owen* | 364 | | |
| Independent | D. Kingdom | 226 | | |
| Independent | C. Stevens | 150 | | |
| Turnout | | | | |
| Independent hold | | Swing | | |
| Independent hold | | Swing | | |

=== Pembroke Pennar (two seats) ===
Pembroke Pennar 1976
| Party | Candidate | Votes | % | ±% |
|---|---|---|---|---|
| Independent | R. Forster | 491 | | |
| Independent | K. Phillips | 488 | | |
| Independent | C.E. Nicholls | 290 | | |
| Independent hold | | Swing | | |
| Independent hold | | Swing | | |

=== Penally (one seat) ===
Penally 1976
| Party | Candidate | Votes | % | ±% |
|---|---|---|---|---|
| Independent | W. Lawrence | unopposed | | |
| Independent hold | | Swing | | |

=== St Issels (two seats) ===
St Issels 1976
| Party | Candidate | Votes | % | ±% |
|---|---|---|---|---|
| Independent | B. Williams* | 760 | | |
| Independent | Lawrence William James Duncan | 632 | | |
| Independent | P. Walker | 454 | | |
| Independent | J. Allen | 360 | | |
| Turnout | | | | |
| Independent hold | | Swing | | |
| Independent hold | | Swing | | |

=== Tenby North (two seats) ===
Tenby North 1976
| Party | Candidate | Votes | % | ±% |
|---|---|---|---|---|
| Independent | Mrs I. Davies* | 580 | | |
| Independent | Denzil Roger George Griffiths | 481 | | |
| Independent | H. Sales | 417 | | |
| Plaid Cymru | Michael Williams* | 307 | | |
| Turnout | | | | |
| Independent hold | | Swing | | |
| Independent gain from Plaid Cymru | | Swing | | |

=== Tenby South (two seats) ===
Tenby South 1976
| Party | Candidate | Votes | % | ±% |
|---|---|---|---|---|
| Independent | C.H Evans* | 336 | | |
| Independent | T.G. Phillips | 320 | | |
| Independent | H.A. Mace* | 312 | | |
| Turnout | | | | |
| Independent hold | | Swing | | |
| Independent hold | | Swing | | |
