= Eglwyswrw =

Village, parish and community in Pembrokeshire, Wales

- Location within Pembrokeshire
- Population: 724 (2011)
- OS grid reference: SN141385
- Community: Eglwyswrw
- Principal area: Pembrokeshire
- Preserved county: Dyfed
- Country: Wales
- Sovereign state: United Kingdom
- Post town: Crymych
- Postcode district: SA41
- Dialling code: 01239
- Police: Dyfed-Powys
- Fire: Mid and West Wales
- Ambulance: Welsh
- UK Parliament: Preseli Pembrokeshire
- Senedd Cymru – Welsh Parliament: Ceredigion Penfro
- List of places UK Wales Pembrokeshire 52.014°N 4.710°W Map of the community

Eglwyswrw ([ɛɡlʊɨˈsuːrʊ]) is a village, community and parish in the former Cantref of Cemais, Pembrokeshire, Wales. The village lies between Newport and Cardigan at the junction of the A487 road and the B4332 at an altitude of 130 metres (430 ft).

The village is in the heart of the Welsh-speaking area of Pembrokeshire; its history goes back at least to Norman times and there are 19 listed buildings in the community.

== History ==
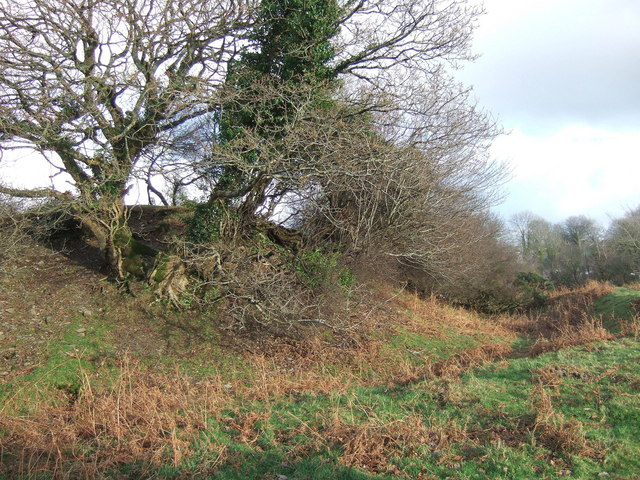
Remains of Norman motte-and-bailey

There is much of archaeological interest in and around Eglwyswrw community, and the village is recorded from Norman times; on the west side of the village is a small Norman motte, designated Castell Eglwyswrw by Coflein.

The sacred nature of the site where the church now stands (see also Worship, below) may date back to before the 8th century, but there was a later Norman church, the earliest record of which is in 1291. A 1578 map in the British Library shows Eglwyswrw parish as Eglosserrow, possibly an English phonetic rendering of the name.

The village hosted several important fairs, including Meigan Fair (Ffair Feigan) at least as early as 1794. A report in 1915 listed animal prices and noted a decline in horse prices.

In the mid-19th century, the parish of Eglwyswrw covered 3,664 acres (1,483 ha).

In 1895, following the death of local landowner W. Mathias, property and land covering nearly the whole of the village was auctioned in 16 lots for a total sum of nearly £7,000; some of the property, which included two pubs, the Butchers Arms and The Plough, was bought by tenants.

Villager Stephen Lewis celebrated his 102nd birthday in 1923. He had been a local schoolmaster at the age of 13, but spent most of his life as a farm worker. He died aged 103, reportedly never having seen a doctor.

Eglwyswrw War Memorial lists the names of 24 servicemen of the parish who lost their lives in World War 1, and one in World War 2. In 2014 a new War Memorial was erected in the churchyard.

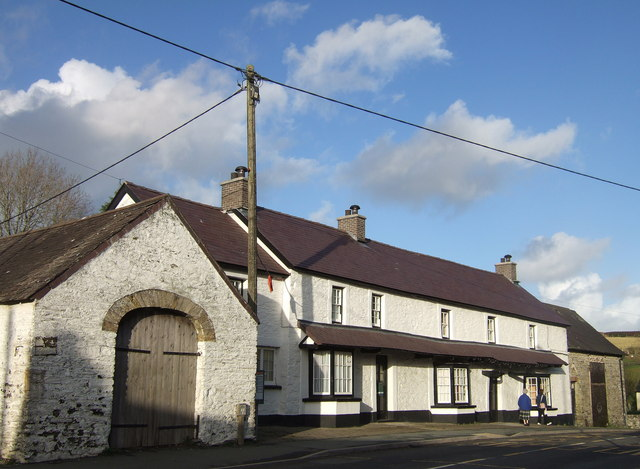
Serjeants Inn

The Serjeants Inn, now a private residence, was a Grade II-listed public house dating back to the 17th or 18th century, so named because the Cemais Assizes were held there. It closed in the 1990s. To the rear of the inn is a former meeting house which served as a chapel and a school in the 19th century. The coach house on the west side of the inn is also Grade II-listed, as is the Armoury, or former stables. The Butcher's Arms, the village's other pub, featured in a 2004 Canadian Visa campaign highlighting difficult-to-pronounce placenames around the world. There was irony in the fact that the pub did not accept Visa cards. The Butcher"s Arms closed in 2016. The village shop and Post Office closed in 2009.

In January 2016 Eglwyswrw was reported to be one of the wettest villages in Britain, having suffered freak rainfall on 85 consecutive days in 2015, five days short of the British record.

In 2022, Eglwyswrw became the first place in the UK to have an off-grid mobile phone mast.

=== Significant sites ===
The 2008 Royal Commission on the Ancient and Historical Monuments of Wales listed 85 sites of importance within the community of Eglwyswrw. There are 19 listed buildings in the community.

=== Demographics ===
The population has remained fairly constant in the mid-hundreds since the beginning of the 19th century (OPCS):

Date	1801	1831	1861	1891	1921	1951	1981	2001	2011
Population	434	563	490	419	335	366	369	732	724

== Administration ==
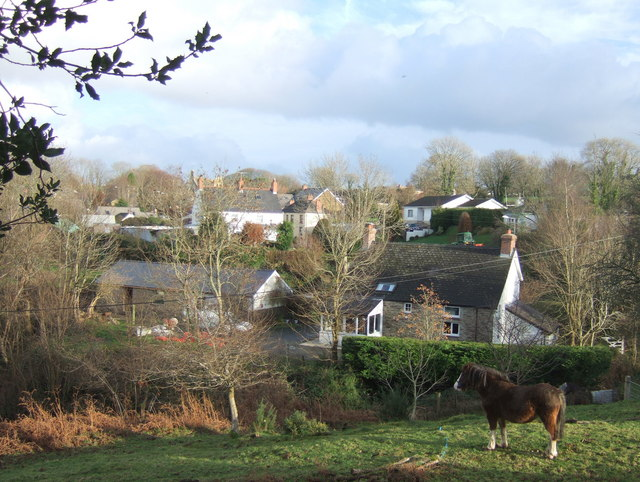
View over Eglwyswrw

Eglwyswrw has its own elected community council and is part of the Cilgerran electoral ward for the purposes of elections to Pembrokeshire County Council. The community of Eglwyswrw includes the parish of Meline, the north part of Llanfair-Nant-Gwyn and the south-eastern part of Nevern, including Brynberian. Crymych ward was 60% Welsh-speaking in 2011, a small decrease from 63% in 2001.

== Amenities ==
As well as self-catering accommodation and retail premises, Eglwyswrw features a parish church, Norman remains, a community school and nearby attractions.

=== Worship ===
The Welsh placename of the village means "church of St Eirw", and there once existed a chantry attached to the churchyard, in which this minor female saint was allegedly interred. A mediaeval church of unknown date succeeded the Norman church, and it was noted in 1504 that the chancel was "ruinous, and the windows not glazed", with the blame falling on the Vicar, Dom. Phillip Lloyd. Similar accusations were made in 1684. In 1708 the church (then called Eglwys Yrrow) was reported as in good repair.

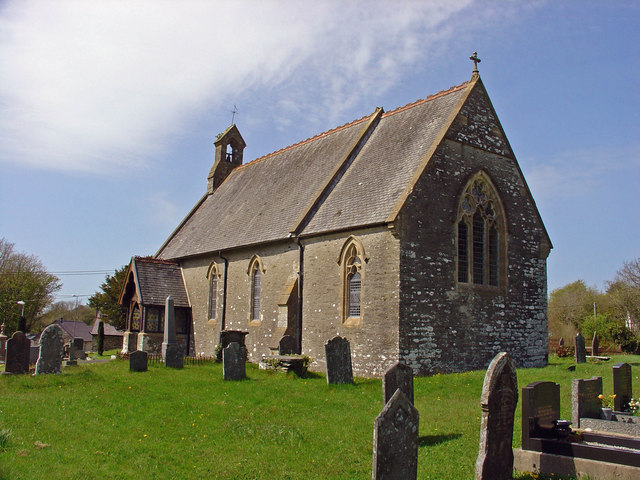
Eglwyswrw Parish Church

The present parish church of Saint Cristiolus is situated in the centre of the village and dates from before 1829 when it was restored. The vicar in 1855 was the Reverend Thomas Evans, replacing the Reverend D. Prothero who had died. The church was restored again in 1883 by local contractor Evan Evans, an event reported in depth by the Western Mail, which suggested that a church had existed in Eglwyswrw since 1150. The vicar in 1888 was the Reverend T. M. Jones, who was summonsed for non-payment of poor rates due on tithes, but as a result of legal arguments the case was dismissed.

Elim Baptist Mission Room opened in 1839 and closed about 1937.

=== Education ===
Ysgol Gymunedol Eglwyswrw is a Welsh-medium primary school situated in the village. As of 2022, there were 92 pupils on roll at the school. 76.5 per cent of the school's pupils are from Welsh-speaking homes.

=== Attractions ===
Dyfed Shire Horse Farm is half a mile to the south-west of the village on the A487 at its junction with the B4329 scenic route to Haverfordwest over the Preseli Mountains. The farm has provided horses for military parades, and H.M. The Queen named a foal in 2020 in recognition of the foal's uncle serving in the Household Cavalry, and the foal being born on the Queen's birthday. One of the Household Cavalry's horses took part in Queen Elizabeth II's funeral procession in 2022 and also the coronation of King Charles III in 2023. A little further on the A487 is Castell Henllys, a reconstructed Iron Age Fort.
