= 1987 South Pembrokeshire District Council election =

1987 Welsh local government election

An election to South Pembrokeshire District Council was held in May 1987. An Independent majority was maintained. It was preceded by the 1983 election and followed by the 1991 election. On the same day there were elections to the other district local authorities and community councils in Wales.

== Boundary Changes ==
There was a slight reduction in the number of seats as boundaries were realigned.

== Results by Ward ==
=== Amroth (one seat) ===
Amroth 1987
Party	Candidate	Votes	%	±%
Independent	Alan Walter Edwards*	374		
Independent	A.H. Miles	112		
Independent hold		Swing		

=== Begelly (one seat) ===
Begelly 1987
Party	Candidate	Votes	%	±%
Independent	A. Llewellyn	387	54.1	
Independent	N. Jackson	229	32.0	
Independent	Thomas John Price	100	14.0	
Majority				
Independent hold		Swing		

=== Carew (one seat) ===
Carew 1987
Party	Candidate	Votes	%	±%
Independent	Norman Richard Parry	unopposed		
Independent hold		Swing		

=== Hundleton (one seat) ===
Hundleton 1987
Party	Candidate	Votes	%	±%
Independent	John Seymour Allen-Mierhouse*	unopposed		
Independent hold		Swing		

=== Lampeter Velfrey (one seat) ===
Lampeter Velfrey 1987
Party	Candidate	Votes	%	±%
Independent	D.B. Davies*	431		
Independent	D.E. Lewis	196		
Independent hold		Swing		

=== Lamphey (one seat) ===
Lamphey 1987
Party	Candidate	Votes	%	±%
Independent	I.M. White*	unopposed		
Independent hold		Swing		

=== Manorbier (one seat) ===
Manorbier 1987
Party	Candidate	Votes	%	±%
Independent	W.R. Douglas*	Unopposed	N/A	N/A
Independent hold				

=== Martletwy (one seat) ===
Martletwy 1987
Party	Candidate	Votes	%	±%
Independent	Thomas Elwyn James*	unopposed		
Independent hold		Swing		

=== Narberth Rural (one seat) ===
Narberth Rural 1987
Party	Candidate	Votes	%	±%
Independent	William Richard Colin Davies*	unopposed		
Independent hold		Swing		

=== Narberth Urban (one seat) ===
Narberth Urban 1987
Party	Candidate	Votes	%	±%
Independent	A.W. Walker	533		
Independent	J.E. Feetham*	417		
Majority		116		
Independent hold		Swing		

=== Pembroke Monkton (one seat) ===
Pembroke Monkton 1987
Party	Candidate	Votes	%	±%
Labour	Mrs S. Levesley*	unopposed		
Labour win (new seat)				

=== Pembroke St Mary (two seats) ===
Pembroke St Mary 1987
Party	Candidate	Votes	%	±%
Independent	I.C.J. Jenkins*	unopposed		
Independent	E.L.J. Morgan*	unopposed		
Independent hold		Swing		
Independent hold		Swing		

=== Pembroke St Michael (two seats) ===
Pembroke St Michael 1987
Party	Candidate	Votes	%	±%
Independent	D.H. Lloyd*	470		
Independent	C.J. Collins	380		
Labour	G.A. Hay-Watkins	325		
Independent	E. Reed	301		
Independent win (new seat)				
Independent win (new seat)				

=== Pembroke Dock Central (one seat) ===
Pembroke Dock Central 1987
Party	Candidate	Votes	%	±%
Independent	Thomas Vivian Hay*	unopposed		
Independent hold		Swing		

=== Pembroke Dock Llanion (two seats) ===
Pembroke Dock Llanion 1987
Party	Candidate	Votes	%	±%
Labour	Charles Howard Thomas*	495		
Independent	Dillwyn Morgan Davies*	486		
Independent	Walford John Davies*	337		
Alliance	A.D. Goodman	237		
Independent hold		Swing		
Labour hold		Swing		

=== Pembroke Dock Market (one seat) ===
Pembroke Dock Market 1987
Party	Candidate	Votes	%	±%
Independent	William Skyrme Rees*	458		
Independent	S.C. Peters	68		
Independent win (new seat)				

=== Pembroke Dock Pennar (two seats) ===
Pembroke Dock Pennar 1987
Party	Candidate	Votes	%	±%
Independent	Brian John Hall	899		
Alliance	J.S. Fenwick	436		
Labour	W.B. Glaister	397		
Independent	M.W. Cavaney	304		
Independent gain from Labour		Swing		
Alliance gain from Labour		Swing		

=== Penally (one seat) ===
Penally 1987
Party	Candidate	Votes	%	±%
Independent	Eileen Hodgson*	unopposed		
Majority				
Independent hold		Swing		

=== Saundersfoot (two seats) ===
Saundersfoot 1987
Party	Candidate	Votes	%	±%
Independent	Rosemary Rebecca Hayes*	656		
Independent	W.T. Cleevely	485		
Independent	L.W.J. Duncan*	378		
Independent	H.M. Wright	190		
Independent	J.V. Rozbon	140		
Labour	C.A. Clarkson	136		
Independent hold		Swing		
Independent hold		Swing		

=== Stackpole (one seat) ===
Stackpole 1987
Party	Candidate	Votes	%	±%
Independent	Andrew Stenson	unopposed		
Independent hold		Swing		

=== Tenby (four seats) ===
Tenby 1987
Party	Candidate	Votes	%	±%
Independent	Michael Tracy Folland*	1,168		
Independent	Denzil Roger George Griffiths*	1,050		
Independent	W. Hardy*	1,020		
Plaid Cymru	Michael Williams*	912		
Independent	C.J. Evans*	718		
Independent	W.S. Rossiter	596		
Independent	T.S. Phillips	556		
Independent	G.S. Phillips	99		
Independent hold		Swing		
Independent hold		Swing		
Independent hold		Swing		
Plaid Cymru gain from Independent		Swing		
