= Clydau (electoral ward) =

Electoral ward in Pembrokeshire, Wales

Clydau is an electoral ward in Pembrokeshire, Wales. The ward consists of the communities of Boncath and Clydau.

Since 2004 it has been represented by Plaid Cymru councillor Rod Bowen.

A ward of Pembrokeshire County Council since 1995 it was previously a ward of the former Preseli Pembrokeshire District Council. The population of this ward taken at the 2011 census was 1,451.
