= Mid and South Pembrokeshire =

UK Parliament constituency (since 2024)

- constituency for the House of Commons
- Interactive map of the constituency.
- Location of the constituency within Wales
- Electorate: 76,820 (March 2020)
- Major settlements: Haverfordwest, Tenby, Milford Haven, Pembroke, St. David's

Current constituency
- Member of Parliament: Henry Tufnell (Labour)
- Seats: One

Overlaps
- Senedd: Ceredigion Penfro

Mid and South Pembrokeshire (Welsh: Canol a De Sir Benfro) is a constituency of the House of Commons in the UK Parliament, first contested at the 2024 United Kingdom general election following the 2023 review of Westminster constituencies. It is currently represented by Henry Tufnell of the Labour Party.

== Boundaries ==
Under the 2023 review, the constituency was defined as being composed of the following wards of the County of Pembrokeshire, as they existed on 1 December 2020:

- Amroth; Burton; Camrose; Carew; East Williamston; Haverfordwest: Castle; Haverfordwest: Garth; Haverfordwest: Portfield; Haverfordwest: Prendergast; Haverfordwest: Priory; Hundleton; Johnston; Kilgetty/Begelly; Lampeter Velfrey; Lamphey; Letterston; Llangwm; Manorbier; Martletwy; Merlin’s Bridge; Milford: Central; Milford: East; Milford: Hakin; Milford: Hubberston; Milford: North; Milford: West; Narberth; Narberth Rural; Neyland: East; Neyland: West; Pembroke Dock: Central; Pembroke Dock: Llanion; Pembroke Dock: Market; Pembroke Dock: Pennar; Pembroke: Monkton; Pembroke: St. Mary North; Pembroke: St. Mary South; Pembroke: St. Michael; Penally; Rudbaxton; St. David’s; St. Ishmael’s; Saundersfoot; Solva; Tenby: North; Tenby: South; The Havens; Wiston.

Following local government boundary reviews which came into effect in May 2022, the constituency now comprises the following areas in Pembrokeshire from the 2024 general election:

- Part of the former Carmarthen West and South Pembrokeshire constituency:
  - The wards of Amroth and Saundersfoot North, Carew and Jeffreyston, East Williamston, Hundleton, Kilgetty and Begelly, Lampeter Velfrey, Lamphey, Manorbier and Penally, Martletwy (most), Narberth Urban, Narberth Rural, Pembroke Dock Bufferland, Pembroke Dock Bush, Pembroke Dock Central, Pembroke Dock Market, Pembroke Dock Pennar, Pembroke Monkton and St Mary South, Pembroke St Mary North, Pembroke St Michael, Saundersfoot South, St Florence and St Mary Out Liberty, Tenby North, and Tenby South (34,332 electors in total)
- Part of the former Preseli Pembrokeshire constituency:
  - The wards of Burton, Camrose, Haverfordwest Castle, Haverfordwest Garth, Haverfordwest Portfield, Haverfordwest Prendergast, Haverfordwest Priory, Johnston, Letterston, Llangwm, Martletwy (the remaining 345 electors), Merlin's Bridge, Milford Central, Milford East, Milford Hakin, Milford Hubberston, Milford North, Milford West, Neyland East, Neyland West, Rudbaxton and Spittal, Solva, St David's, St Ishmael's, The Havens, and Wiston (most) (42,446 electors in total)

== Members of Parliament ==
Carmarthen West and South Pembrokeshire and Preseli Pembrokeshire prior to 2024

Election	Member	Party
2024	Henry Tufnell	Labour

== Elections ==
=== Elections in the 2020s ===
General election 2024: Mid and South Pembrokeshire
Party	Candidate	Votes	%	±%
Labour	Henry Tufnell	16,505	35.4	−1.8
Conservative	Stephen Crabb	14,627	31.4	−21.5
Reform	Stuart Marchant	7,828	16.8	N/A
Plaid Cymru	Cris Tomos	2,962	6.4	+1.1
Liberal Democrats	Alistair Cameron	2,372	5.1	+0.5
Green	James Purchase	1,654	3.5	N/A
Independent	Vusi Siphika	427	0.9	N/A
Women's Equality	Hanna Andersen	254	0.5	N/A
Rejected ballots		147 (Note: Of the 147 rejected ballots in the 2024 election: 119 were either unmarked or it was uncertain who the vote was for.; 28 voted for more than one candidate.)	0.3	
Majority		1,878	4.0	N/A
Turnout		46,629	59.2	−12.6
Registered electors		79,031		
Labour win (new seat)				

=== Elections in the 2010s ===
2019 notional result (Note: Estimate of the 2019 general election result as if the revised boundaries recommended under the 2023 boundary review were in place)
Party	Vote	%
Conservative	29,072	52.9
Labour	20,451	37.2
Plaid Cymru	2,917	5.3
Liberal Democrats	2,531	4.6
Majority	8,621	15.7
Turnout	54,971	71.6
Electorate	76,820	
