= 1999 Pembrokeshire County Council election =

1999 Welsh local government election

The 1999 elections to Pembrokeshire County Council were held on 6 May 1999. It was preceded by the 1995 election and followed by the 2004 election. On the same day there were the first elections to the Welsh Assembly and elections to the other 21 local authorities in Wales and community councils in Wales.

All council seats were up for election.

== Overview ==
Boundary changes were introduced at this election. In the main, however, these resulted in the splitting of multi-member wards in urban areas into single-member wards. The Independents retained control of the authority although there was an increased number of party candidates. Most notably, the Conservative Party fielded a large slate of candidates for the first time. Three of these candidates were successful.

Pembrokeshire County Council election result 1999
Party	Seats	Gains	Losses	Net gain/loss	Seats %	Votes %	Votes	+/−
Labour								
Conservative	3	3	0	+3				
Liberal Democrats								
Plaid Cymru								
Independent								

== Unopposed Returns ==
There were comparatively few unopposed returns, partly as a result of the increasingly politicised nature of the election.

== Gains and Losses ==
A number of seats changed hands, including several cases where one Independent defeated another.

== Results by Ward ==
=== Amroth ===
The Liberal Democrat candidate had been returned unopposed in 1995.

Amroth 1999
Party	Candidate	Votes	%	±%
Conservative	Mary Kathleen Megarry	164	40.0	+40.0
Labour	Norman Ronald Spence	152	36.1	+36.1
Liberal Democrats	Ronald E.J. Roberts	105	24.9	+24.9
Majority		12	3.9	
Conservative gain from Liberal Democrats		Swing		

=== Burton ===
Burton 1999
Party	Candidate	Votes	%	±%
Conservative	Roger David Wildman	276	41.2	+41.2
Independent	Lewis James Lloyd*	257	38.4	−36.5
Labour	Brian William Molyneaux	137	20.4	−4.5
Majority		19	2.8	
Conservative gain from Independent		Swing		

=== Camrose ===
Desmond Codd had been returned unopposed in 1995.

Camrose 1999
Party	Candidate	Votes	%	±%
Independent	James Desmond Edward Codd*	803	72.9	+72.9
Conservative	David Loosemore	298	27.1	+27.1
Majority		505	45.8	
Independent hold		Swing		

=== Carew ===
Carew 1999
Party	Candidate	Votes	%	±%
Independent	Norman Richard Parry*	280	52.5	−14.4
Conservative	Richard Frederick Shepherd	144	27.0	+27.0
Independent	Frances Little	109	20.5	+20.5
Majority		136	25.5	−8.3
Independent hold		Swing		

=== Cilgerran ===
Cilgerran 1999
Party	Candidate	Votes	%	±%
Independent	John Thomas Davies	478		
Independent	Rev Dafydd Henry Edwards*	227		
Labour	Michael Frederick McNamara	161		
Majority		251		
Independent hold		Swing		

=== Clydau ===
Clydau 1999
Party	Candidate	Votes	%	±%
Independent	Rev Emyr Huw Jones*	407		
Plaid Cymru	Rev Aled Wyn ap Gwynedd*	313		
Majority		94		
Independent gain from Plaid Cymru		Swing		

=== Crymych ===
Crymych 1999
Party	Candidate	Votes	%	±%
Independent	John Lynn Davies*	unopposed		
Independent hold		Swing		

=== Dinas Cross ===
Dinas Cross 1999
Party	Candidate	Votes	%	±%
Independent	Alun John Bringley Griffiths*	463		
Labour	Steven Grant Stockham	183		
Conservative	Sally Anne Williams	169		
Majority		280		
Independent hold		Swing		

=== East Williamston ===
East Williamston 1999
Party	Candidate	Votes	%	±%
Independent	D.G. Williams*	unopposed??		
Independent hold		Swing		

=== Fishguard North East ===
Fishguard North East 1999
Party	Candidate	Votes	%	±%
Independent	Brian Francis Howells	598		
Plaid Cymru	Delwyn Davies*	217		
Independent win (new seat)				

=== Fishguard North West ===
Fishguard North West 1999
Party	Candidate	Votes	%	±%
Labour	William Brynmor Colnet	unopposed??		
Labour win (new seat)				

=== Goodwick ===
The retiring member, a long-serving county and district councillor, elected as an Independent in 1995, had subsequently joined the Labour Party.

Goodwick 1999
Party	Candidate	Votes	%	±%
Labour	William Lloyd Evans*	566		
Plaid Cymru	Christopher Malcolm James	198		
Majority		368		
Labour hold		Swing		

=== Haverfordwest Castle ===
Haverfordwest Castle 1999
Party	Candidate	Votes	%	±%
Labour	Thomas Baden Tudor	556		
Conservative	Jasper George Curthoys Slater	234		
Majority				
Labour hold		Swing		

=== Haverfordwest Garth ===
Haverfordwest Garth 1999
Party	Candidate	Votes	%	±%
Labour	Elizabeth Joyce Watson*	356		
Independent	Donald Richard Twigg	234		
Majority		122		
Labour hold		Swing		

=== Haverfordwest Portfield ===
Haverfordwest Portfield 1999
Party	Candidate	Votes	%	±%
Independent	Peter Alan Stock*	890		
Plaid Cymru	Christopher Leon Gilham	190		
Majority		700		
Independent hold		Swing		

=== Haverfordwest Prendergast ===
Haverfordwest Prendergast 1999
Party	Candidate	Votes	%	±%
Independent	Herbert William George John	511		
Conservative	Dewi Llewellyn James	137		
Labour	Barbara Anne Sharon Shone	137		
Majority		344		
Independent hold		Swing		

=== Haverfordwest Priory ===
Haverfordwest Priory 1999
Party	Candidate	Votes	%	±%
Independent	Joseph Absalom Roy Folland*	474		
Labour	Ronald George Butler	267		
Majority		207		
Independent hold		Swing		

=== Hundleton ===
Hundleton 1999
Party	Candidate	Votes	%	±%
Independent	John Seymour Allen-Mierhouse*	568		
Labour	Valerie Lucarda Jones	191		
Majority		377		
Independent hold		Swing		

=== Johnston ===
Johnston 1999
Party	Candidate	Votes	%	±%
Independent	George Charles Grey*	372		
Labour	Richard Daniel Blackdaw-Jones	318		
Conservative	Francis John Elliott	214		
Majority		54		
Independent hold		Swing		

=== Kilgetty / Begelly ===
Kilgetty / Begelly 1999
Party	Candidate	Votes	%	±%
Independent	John Scott Murphy*	641		
Plaid Cymru	Howard Geoffrey Horton-Jones	167		
Majority				
Independent hold		Swing		

=== Lampeter Velfrey ===
Lampeter Velfrey 1999
Party	Candidate	Votes	%	±%
Independent	Glyn Davies	315		
Labour	Donna Elizabeth Lewis	298		
Majority		17		
Independent hold		Swing		

=== Lamphey ===
The Independent candidate had been a Labour councillor on the previous South Pembrokeshire District Council but was defeated at the inaugural election in 1995.

Lamphey 1999
Party	Candidate	Votes	%	±%
Independent	Clive John Collins	403		
Labour	David William Edwards*	255		
Majority		148		
Independent gain from Labour		Swing		

=== Letterston ===
Letterston 1999
Party	Candidate	Votes	%	±%
Independent	Thomas James Richards*	553		
Liberal Democrats	Michael Ian Warden	371		
Majority				
Independent hold		Swing		

=== Llangwm ===
Llangwm
Party	Candidate	Votes	%	±%
Independent	William Henry Hitchings*	463		
Conservative	Enid Margaret Maud Rees	251		
Labour	Beryl Acton	194		
Majority		212		
Independent hold		Swing		

=== Llanrhian ===
Llanrhian 1999
Party	Candidate	Votes	%	±%
Independent	???	unopposed		
Independent hold		Swing		

=== Maenclochog ===
Maenclochog 1999
Party	Candidate	Votes	%	±%
Independent	David John Thomas*	839		
Independent	Patricia Ann Bowen	188		
Majority				
Independent hold		Swing		

=== Manorbier ===
Manorbier 1999
Party	Candidate	Votes	%	±%
Independent	Patricia Edwina Griffiths*	481		
Independent	Lewis Malcolm Calver	289		
Majority		192		
Independent hold		Swing		

=== Martletwy ===
Martletwy 1999
Party	Candidate	Votes	%	±%
Independent	Thomas Elwyn James*	341		
Liberal Democrats	David O.J.S. Lort-Phillips	209		
Majority		132		
Independent hold		Swing		

=== Merlin’s Bridge ===
Merlin's Bridge 1999
Party	Candidate	Votes	%	±%
Independent	Cyril George Maurice Hughes*	462		
Labour	Colin John Watson	271		
Independent hold		Swing		

=== Milford Central ===
Milford Central 1999
Party	Candidate	Votes	%	±%
Liberal Democrats	Thomas Henry Sinclair*	282		
Independent	Anne Hughes	268		
Labour	Simon Patrick McGrath	230		
Liberal Democrats win (new seat)				

=== Milford East ===
Milford East 1999
Party	Candidate	Votes	%	±%
Labour	Barrie Thomas Woolmer	361		
Plaid Cymru	David Rhys Sinnett	251		
Labour win (new seat)				

=== Milford Hakin ===
Milford Hakin 1999
Party	Candidate	Votes	%	±%
Independent	George Noel William Max*	435		
Labour	Molly Patricia Pritchard	407		
Independent	Irwin Edwards	124		
Independent win (new seat)				

=== Milford Hubberston ===
Milford Hubberston 1999
Party	Candidate	Votes	%	±%
Labour	Alun Emanuel Byrne	389		
Independent	Eric Ronald Harries*	230		
Plaid Cymru	Patrick Joseph Ryan	142		
Liberal Democrats	Beryl John	74		
Labour win (new seat)				

=== Milford North ===
Milford North 1999
Party	Candidate	Votes	%	±%
Labour	John William Cole	417		
Conservative	Stanley Thomas Hudson	347		
Labour win (new seat)				

=== Milford West ===
Milford West 1999
Party	Candidate	Votes	%	±%
Labour	Terry Mills	498		
Independent	Edward George Setterfield*	237		
Conservative	Maurice William Victor Hart	130		
Labour win (new seat)				

=== Narberth ===
-->

Narberth
Party	Candidate	Votes	%	±%
Independent	Thomas David Watkins*	unopposed		
Independent hold		Swing		

=== Narberth Rural ===
Narberth Rural 1999
Party	Candidate	Votes	%	±%
Independent	William Richard Colin Davies*	375		
Plaid Cymru	Malcolm Connah	118		
Independent	Lynne Webb	90		
Independent hold		Swing		

=== Newport ===
Newport 1999
Party	Candidate	Votes	%	±%
Independent	Essex Robert John Havard*	464		
Independent	John William James Roberts	148		
Majority				
Independent hold		Swing		

=== Neyland East ===
Neyland East
Party	Candidate	Votes	%	±%
Labour	Simon Leslie Hancock*	unopposed		
Labour hold		Swing		

=== Neyland West ===
-->

Neyland West
Party	Candidate	Votes	%	±%
Labour	Kenneth Arthur Edwards	503		
Independent	P.A. Gilbert*	304		
Majority		199		
Labour gain from Independent		Swing		

=== Pembroke Monkton ===
Pembroke Monkton 1999
Party	Candidate	Votes	%	±%
Independent	Pearl Llewellyn	332		
Labour	Kenvyn Corris Jones*	205		
Majority		127		
Independent gain from Labour		Swing		

=== Pembroke St Mary North ===
Party	Candidate	Votes	%	±%
Labour	Clifford Henry Darlington	572		
Independent	Kenneth Bryan Phillips	436		
Independent	Pedr S. McMullan*	383		
Liberal Democrats	A.I. Hovey	253		
Labour win (new seat)				

=== Pembroke St Mary South ===
Party	Candidate	Votes	%	±%
Labour	Clifford Henry Darlington	572		
Independent	Kenneth Bryan Phillips	436		
Independent	Pedr S. McMullan*	383		
Liberal Democrats	A.I. Hovey	253		
Labour win (new seat)				

=== Pembroke St Michael ===
Pembroke St Michael 1999
Party	Candidate	Votes	%	±%
Liberal Democrats	John Martin Allen*	466		
Conservative	Aden Arthur Brinn	380		
Majority		86		
Liberal Democrats hold		Swing		

=== Pembroke Dock Central ===
Pembroke Dock Central 1999
Party	Candidate	Votes	%	±%
Independent	Thomas Vivian Hay*	367		
Liberal Democrats	Donald Thomas Esmond	179		
Majority				
Independent hold		Swing		

=== Pembroke Dock Llanion ===
Pembroke Dock Llanion
Party	Candidate	Votes	%	±%
Labour	Jacqueline R. Lawrence+	unopposed		
Labour hold		Swing		

=== Pembroke Dock Market ===
Pembroke Dock Market 1999
Party	Candidate	Votes	%	±%
Independent	Brian John Hall*	409		
Labour	Veronica Mary Jane Roach	256		
Majority				
Independent hold		Swing		

=== Pembroke Dock Pennar ===
Pembroke Dock Pennar 1999
Party	Candidate	Votes	%	±%
Independent	Anthony William Wilcox	547		
Labour	Stephen James May*	491		
Majority		56		
Independent gain from Labour		Swing		

=== Penally ===
Penally
Party	Candidate	Votes	%	±%
Independent	Eileen Hodgson*	unopposed		
Independent hold		Swing		

=== Rudbaxton ===
Rudbaxton
Party	Candidate	Votes	%	±%
Independent	D.E. Pritchard	unopposed		
Independent hold		Swing		

=== St David's ===
St David's 1999
Party	Candidate	Votes	%	±%
Independent	David John Henry George	354		
Liberal Democrats	David Gareth Beechey Lloyd	219		
Independent	William James Wilcox	191		
Labour	Stephen George Whitehead	150		
Independent	Dilwyn Phillips*	109		
Majority				
Independent hold		Swing		

=== St Dogmaels ===
St Dogmaels
Party	Candidate	Votes	%	±%
Independent	Rev Emyr Huw Jones	365		
Labour	R.W. Day	198		
Majority				
Independent hold		Swing		

=== St Ishmael's ===
St Ishmael's
Party	Candidate	Votes	%	±%
Independent	Basil Ralph Woodruff*	unopposed		
Independent hold		Swing		

=== Saundersfoot ===
Saundersfoot 1999
Party	Candidate	Votes	%	±%
Independent	Rosemary Rebecca Hayes*	unopposed		
Independent hold		Swing		

=== Scleddau ===
Scleddau
Party	Candidate	Votes	%	±%
Independent	Alwyn Cadwallader Luke*	315		
Labour	Vaughan Barrah	190		
Majority		125		
Independent hold		Swing		

=== Solva ===
Solva
Party	Candidate	Votes	%	±%
Independent	John Gordon Cawood*	742		
Independent	K.A. Cross	79		
Majority				
Independent hold		Swing		

=== Tenby North (two seats) ===
Tenby North 1999
Party	Candidate	Votes	%	±%
Plaid Cymru	Michael Williams*	395		
Independent	John Iwan Parry Hughes	368		
Plaid Cymru win (new seat)				

=== Tenby South ===
Tenby South
Party	Candidate	Votes	%	±%
Independent	M.T. Folland*	1,137		
Plaid Cymru	Michael Williams*	844		
Labour	W.J. Rossiter	640		
Independent	D.R.G. Griffiths*	503		
Independent	A.P. Rees	246		
Independent	J. Phillips*	230		
Independent win (new seat)				

=== The Havens ===
The boundaries were identical to those of the same ward on the previous Preseli / South Pembrokeshire District Council.

The Havens
Party	Candidate	Votes	%	±%
Independent	E.G.S. Mock	300		
Independent	C.J. Farr	191		
Independent hold		Swing		

=== Wiston ===
The boundaries were identical to those of the same ward on the previous Preseli / South Pembrokeshire District Council.

Wiston
Party	Candidate	Votes	%	±%
Independent	Peter Edmund Masterson	587		
Independent	C.A. Olding	108		
Majority		479		
Independent hold		Swing		
