= South Pembrokeshire =

Former district of Dyfed, Wales

South Pembrokeshire Welsh: De Sir Benfro
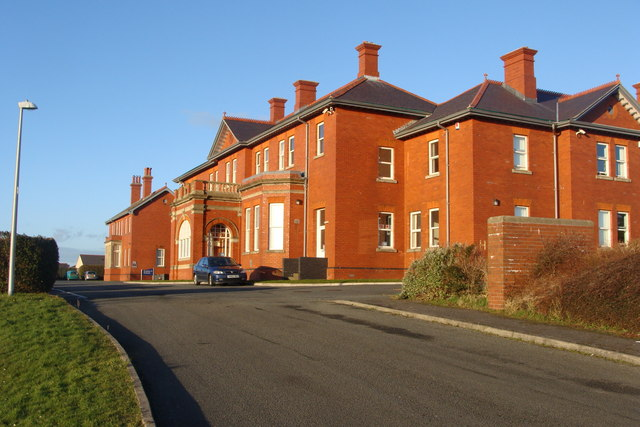
- Council Offices: Llanion Park, Pembroke Dock

- History
  - Created: 1 April 1974
  - Abolished: 31 March 1996
  - Succeeded by: Pembrokeshire
- Status: District
  - HQ: Pembroke Dock

South Pembrokeshire (Welsh: De Sir Benfro) was one of six local government districts of Dyfed, Wales from 1974 to 1996.

== Creation ==
The district was formed on 1 April 1974 under the Local Government Act 1972, from the following parts of the administrative county of Pembrokeshire:

- Narberth Rural District
- Narberth Urban District
- Pembroke Municipal Borough (which included Pembroke Dock)
- Pembroke Rural District
- Tenby Municipal Borough

The map shows the district as defined above. However, in 1981, the communities of Bletherston, Clarbeston, Llandeilo Llwydarth, Llandissilio West, Llangolman, Llanycefn, Llys y Fran, Maenclochog, Mynachlog-ddu, New Moat and Vorlan were transferred to Preseli district.

== Premises ==
The council was based at Llanion Park at Pembroke Dock. The building had been built in 1904 as part of the Llanion Barracks, and had been acquired by the former Pembroke Borough Council in the early 1970s to serve as its headquarters, just a couple of years before that council's abolition.

== Abolition ==
It was abolished on 1 April 1996, merging with its neighbouring district of Preseli Pembrokeshire to form a reconstituted Pembrokeshire unitary authority. The council's old offices at Llanion Park were used by the new council until the new County Hall at Haverfordwest opened in 1999. The building at Llanion Park is now the headquarters of the Pembrokeshire Coast National Park Authority.

== Political control ==
The first election to the council was held in 1973, initially operating as a shadow authority before coming into its powers on 1 April 1974. Throughout the council's existence a majority of the seats were held by independent councillors.

Party in control	Years
Independent	1974–1996

== Elections ==
- 1973 South Pembrokeshire District Council election
- 1976 South Pembrokeshire District Council election
- 1979 South Pembrokeshire District Council election
- 1983 South Pembrokeshire District Council election
- 1987 South Pembrokeshire District Council election
- 1991 South Pembrokeshire District Council election
