= 2004 Pembrokeshire County Council election =

2004 Welsh local government election

Results of the 2004 Pembrokeshire County Council election

Elections to Pembrokeshire County Council were held on 10 June 2004. It was preceded by the 1999 election and followed by the 2008 election. The results were drawn from the Pembrokeshire County Council website but the relevant page has now (2013) been deleted. On the same day there were elections to the other 21 local authorities in Wales (all except Anglesey), and to community council elections in Wales. There were also elections elsewhere in the United Kingdom

== Overview ==
All 60 council seats were up for election. The previous council was controlled by Independents as had been the case since the authority was formed in 1995. The Independents retained control in 2004 and Labour achieved its worst result of the three elections fought thus far.

Pembrokeshire County Council election result 2004
Party	Seats	Gains	Losses	Net gain/loss	Seats %	Votes %	Votes	+/−
Labour	12							
Conservative	0							
Liberal Democrats	3							
Plaid Cymru	5							
Independent	40							
Green	0							

== Results by ward ==
=== Amroth ===
Amroth 2004
Party	Candidate	Votes	%	±%
Liberal Democrats	John Anthony Brinsden	344	67.7	+42.8
Independent	Peter Treharne Waddilove	93	18.3	+18.3
Labour	Norman Richard Spence	71	14.0	−22.1
Majority		251	49.4	
Liberal Democrats gain from Conservative		Swing		

=== Burton ===
Wildman had been elected as a Conservative in 1999, defeating the sitting Independent councillor, but he subsequently joined the Independents himself.

Burton 2004
Party	Candidate	Votes	%	±%
Independent	Roger David Wildman*	620	84.1	+42.9
Liberal Democrats	Anthony Harold Miles	117	15.9	+15.9
Majority		503	68.2	
Independent hold		Swing		

=== Camrose ===
Camrose 2004
Party	Candidate	Votes	%	±%
Independent	James Llewellyn Adams	572	46.8	+46.8
Independent	Roger James Mathias	362	29.6	+29.6
Liberal Democrats	Karen Smith	181	14.8	+14.8
Independent	Jean Mary Jones	106	8.7	+8.7
Majority		210	17.2	
Independent hold		Swing		

=== Carew ===
Carew 2004
Party	Candidate	Votes	%	±%
Independent	David James Neale	200		
Independent	Derek Hooper Lloyd	181		
Labour	Michael Thorne	152		
Independent	Norman Richard Parry*	118		
Majority				
Independent hold		Swing		

=== Cilgerran ===
Cilgerran
Party	Candidate	Votes	%	±%
Independent	John Thomas Davies*	698		
Plaid Cymru	Matthew Lee Mathias	111		
Majority		587		
Independent hold		Swing		

=== Clydau ===
Clydau
Party	Candidate	Votes	%	±%
Plaid Cymru	Roderick Gwilym Bowen	Unopposed		
Plaid Cymru gain from Independent		Swing		

=== Crymych ===
Crymych
Party	Candidate	Votes	%	±%
Independent	John Lynn Davies*	802		
Plaid Cymru	Ann Rees-Sambrook	300		
Majority		502		
Independent hold		Swing		

=== Dinas Cross ===
Dinas Cross
Party	Candidate	Votes	%	±%
Independent	John Morgan Griffiths	486		
Plaid Cymru	Ann Griffith-McColl	277		
Majority				
Independent hold		Swing		

=== East Williamston ===
East Williamston
Party	Candidate	Votes	%	±%
Independent	Ernest James Codd*	653		
Independent	Graham Charles Thomas	228		
Majority				
Independent hold		Swing		

=== Fishguard North East ===
Fishguard North East
Party	Candidate	Votes	%	±%
Independent	Henry Walter Jones	307		
Plaid Cymru	Myles Christopher Geary Pepper	301		
Independent	Brian Francis Howells*	209		
Majority				
Independent hold		Swing		

=== Fishguard North West ===
Fishguard North West
Party	Candidate	Votes	%	±%
Independent	Sian Elizabeth James	169		
Independent	Richard Parry Davies	157		
Plaid Cymru	Paul Christopher Conti	129		
Labour	Walter Brynmor Colnet*	128		
Majority				
Independent gain from Labour		Swing		

=== Goodwick ===
Goodwick
Party	Candidate	Votes	%	±%
Plaid Cymru	Gwendoline Moira Lewis	244		
Labour	Alun Charles York	215		
Liberal Democrats	Richard John Grosvenor	144		
Independent	Owen Watkin James	126		
Majority				
Plaid Cymru gain from Labour		Swing		

=== Haverfordwest Castle ===
Haverfordwest Castle
Party	Candidate	Votes	%	±%
Labour	Thomas Baden Tudor*	420		
Independent	Debra-Marrie Bryson	207		
Independent	Mark Anthony Rosser	80		
Majority				
Independent hold		Swing		

=== Haverfordwest Garth ===
Haverfordwest Garth
Party	Candidate	Votes	%	±%
Labour	Elizabeth Joyce Watson*	289		
Independent	Dewi Llewellyn James	123		
Plaid Cymru	Terri Francis Kristian Marshall	77		
Majority				
Labour hold		Swing		

=== Haverfordwest Portfield ===
Haverfordwest Portfield
Party	Candidate	Votes	%	±%
Independent	Peter Alan Stock*	818		
Plaid Cymru	Morgan Edward Hart	105		
Majority		713		
Independent hold		Swing		

=== Haverfordwest Prendergast ===
Haverfordwest Prendergast
Party	Candidate	Votes	%	±%
Independent	David Mark Edwards*	575		
Liberal Democrats	Esther Joy Richards	141		
Majority		434		
Independent hold		Swing		

=== Haverfordwest Priory ===
Haverfordwest Priory
Party	Candidate	Votes	%	±%
Independent	David Michael Bryan	434		
Independent	Joyce Wonnacott	149		
Labour	Colin John Watson	148		
Independent	Joseph Absalom Roy Folland*	106		
Liberal Democrats	Ann Virginia Lye	79		
Majority				
Independent hold		Swing		

=== Hundleton ===
Hundleton
Party	Candidate	Votes	%	±%
Independent	John Seymour Allen-Mierhouse*	469		
Independent	Margot Magdalena Hanna Mechthild Bateman	292		
Majority		177		
Independent hold		Swing		

=== Johnston ===
Johnston
Party	Candidate	Votes	%	±%
Labour	Kenneth Rowlands	454		
Conservative	Francis John Elliott	204		
Independent	Stephen James Cole	121		
Majority		251		
Labour hold		Swing		

=== Kilgetty ===
Kilgetty
Party	Candidate	Votes	%	±%
Independent	John Scott Murphy*	395		
Liberal Democrats	Michael James Weaver	294		
Plaid Cymru	Howard Geoffrey Horton-Jones	125		
Majority		101		
Independent hold		Swing		

=== Lampeter Velfrey ===
Lampeter Velfrey
Party	Candidate	Votes	%	±%
Independent	David Simpson	370		
Independent	Frederick Gerard George Luckman	196		
Majority		174		
Independent hold		Swing		

=== Lamphey ===
Lamphey
Party	Candidate	Votes	%	±%
Independent	Clive John Collins*	405		
Independent	Rhonwen Jane Morgan	334		
Majority		171		
Independent hold		Swing		

=== Letterston ===
Letterston
Party	Candidate	Votes	%	±%
Independent	Thomas James Richards*	598		
Plaid Cymru	Christopher Leon Gillham	346		
Majority		252		
Independent hold		Swing		

=== Llangwm ===
Llangwm
Party	Candidate	Votes	%	±%
Independent	William Henry Hitchings*	483		
Independent	John Michael Cutting	304		
Liberal Democrats	Rachel Mary Yates	129		
Majority		179		
Independent hold		Swing		

=== Llanrhian ===
Llanrhian
Party	Candidate	Votes	%	±%
Independent	David William Mansel Rees	334		
Independent	William Joseph Alun Thomas	158		
Plaid Cymru	Clive Idris Morgan	90		
Independent	Jillian Evelyn Morgan	82		
Independent	Sion Hywel Rees	48		
Labour	John Cecil Butler	41		
Majority				
Independent hold		Swing		

=== Maenclochog ===
Maenclochog
Party	Candidate	Votes	%	±%
Independent	David John Thomas*	789		
Plaid Cymru	John Rhys Davies	456		
Majority		333		
Independent hold		Swing		

=== Manorbier ===
Manorbier
Party	Candidate	Votes	%	±%
Independent	Lewis Malcolm Calver	398		
Independent	Patricia Edwina Griffiths*	314		
Labour	Anthony Leonard Wales			
Majority		84		
Independent hold		Swing		

=== Martletwy ===
Martletwy
Party	Candidate	Votes	%	±%
Independent	Robert Mark Lewis*	326		
Liberal Democrats	John Richard Gossage	138		
Independent	Sarah Elizabeth Credland	26		
Majority				
Independent hold		Swing		

=== Merlin’s Bridge ===
Merlin's Bridge
Party	Candidate	Votes	%	±%
Labour	Mary Umelda Havard	306		
Independent	Cyril George Maurice Hughes*	272		
Independent	Arthur John Chapman	122		
Plaid Cymru	Darren Peter Jones	43		
Majority		34		
Labour gain from Independent		Swing		

=== Milford Central ===
Milford Central
Party	Candidate	Votes	%	±%
Independent	Anne Hughes	454		
Labour	Alan Buckfield	177		
Majority				
Independent hold		Swing		

=== Milford East ===
Milford East
Party	Candidate	Votes	%	±%
Independent	Martin Thomas James Davies	247		
Labour	Barrie Thomas Woolmer*	233		
Majority		14		
Independent gain from Labour		Swing		

=== Milford Hakin ===
Milford Hakin
Party	Candidate	Votes	%	±%
Independent	Robert Michael Stoddart	452		
Independent	George Noel William Max*	208		
Labour	Philip Thomas Walker	113		
Independent	Brett David Dickinson	38		
Majority		244		
Independent hold		Swing		

=== Milford Hubberston ===
Milford Hubberston
Party	Candidate	Votes	%	±%
Labour	Alun Emanuel Byrne*	unopposed		
Labour hold		Swing		

=== Milford North ===
Milford North
Party	Candidate	Votes	%	±%
Labour	John William Cole*	425		
Independent	Edward George Setterfield	335		
Majority		90		
Labour hold		Swing		

=== Milford West ===
Milford West
Party	Candidate	Votes	%	±%
Plaid Cymru	David Rhys Sinnett	392		
Labour	Colin Philip Robbins	202		
Majority		190		
Independent hold		Swing		

=== Narberth ===
Narberth
Party	Candidate	Votes	%	±%
Independent	Wynne Edward Evans	391		
Independent	William Henry Langen	276		
Labour	Thomas David Watkins*	235		
Majority		115		
Independent gain from Labour		Swing		

=== Narberth Rural ===
Narberth Rural
Party	Candidate	Votes	%	±%
Independent	William Richard Colin Davies*	329		
Liberal Democrats	Lilian Claire Narbett	224		
Majority		105		
Independent hold		Swing		

=== Newport ===
Newport
Party	Candidate	Votes	%	±%
Independent	Rowland Roderick Evans	300		
Independent	Arthur Glyn Rees*	161		
Plaid Cymru	Edward Byron James	142		
Majority		139		
Independent hold		Swing		

=== Neyland East ===
Neyland East
Party	Candidate	Votes	%	±%
Labour	Simon Leslie Hancock	unopposed		
Labour hold		Swing		

=== Neyland West ===
Neyland West
Party	Candidate	Votes	%	±%
Labour	Kenneth Arthur Edwards	unopposed		
Labour hold		Swing		

=== Pembroke Monkton ===
Pembroke Monkton
Party	Candidate	Votes	%	±%
Labour	Pearl Llewellyn*	347		
Independent	Keith John McNiffe	135		
Majority		212		
Labour hold		Swing		

=== Pembroke St Mary North ===
Party	Candidate	Votes	%	±%
Independent	William John Arwyn Williams	238		
Independent	Kenneth Bryan Phillips*	194		
Labour	Jane Margueritta Major*	179		
Majority		44		
Independent hold		Swing		

=== Pembroke St Mary South ===
Pembroke St Mary South
Party	Candidate	Votes	%	±%
Independent	Rosalie Vera Lilwal	165		
Independent	Wynford Ian Henry Jenkins	127		
Independent	Deborah Louise Griffith-Jones	125		
Labour	David William Edwards	80		
Independent	Keith Neville Nicholas	67		
Majority		38		
Independent hold		Swing		

=== Pembroke St Michael ===
Pembroke St Michael
Party	Candidate	Votes	%	±%
Liberal Democrats	John Martin Allen*	472		
Independent	Aden Arthur Brinn	336		
Majority		136		
Liberal Democrats hold		Swing		

=== Pembroke Dock Central ===
Pembroke Dock Central
Party	Candidate	Votes	%	±%
Labour	Linda Becton	195		
Independent	Alan Stockwell	138		
Liberal Democrats	Donald T. Esmond	115		
Independent	Susan Beasley	62		
Majority		57		
Labour hold		Swing		

=== Pembroke Dock Llanion ===
Pembroke Dock Llanion
Party	Candidate	Votes	%	±%
Labour	Susan Perkins	441		
Independent	Pamela George	299		
Majority		142		
Labour hold		Swing		

=== Pembroke Dock Market ===
Pembroke Dock Market
Party	Candidate	Votes	%	±%
Independent	Brian John Hall	316		
Labour	Maggie Thomas	229		
Independent	Veronica Roach	136		
Majority		87		
Independent hold		Swing		

=== Pembroke Dock Pennar ===
Pembroke Dock Pennar
Party	Candidate	Votes	%	±%
Labour	Anthony Wilcox	721		
Independent	Maureen Colgan	278		
Majority				
Labour hold		Swing		

=== Penally ===
Penally
Party	Candidate	Votes	%	±%
Plaid Cymru	Carol Cavill	601		
Independent	Graham Fry	63		
Majority		538		
Plaid Cymru hold		Swing		

=== Rudbaxton ===
Rudbaxton
Party	Candidate	Votes	%	±%
Independent	David Howells	426		
Independent	Richard Hancock	323		
Majority		103		
Independent hold		Swing		

=== St David's ===
St David’s 2004
Party	Candidate	Votes	%	±%
Independent	David George	394		
Liberal Democrats	David Gareth Beechey Lloyd	284		
Labour	Stephen Whitehead	192		
Majority				
Independent hold		Swing		

=== St Dogmaels ===
St Dogmaels
Party	Candidate	Votes	%	±%
Independent	Stephen Watkins	519		
Plaid Cymru	Vicky Moller	358		
Majority				
Independent hold		Swing		

=== St Ishmael's ===
St Ishmael's
Party	Candidate	Votes	%	±%
Independent	William Joseph Roberts	326		
Liberal Democrats	Thomas Henry Sinclair	240		
Majority		86		
Independent hold		Swing		

=== Saundersfoot ===
Saundersfoot
Party	Candidate	Votes	%	±%
Independent	Rosemary Rebecca Hayes*	517		
Liberal Democrats	Philip Raymond Baker	341		
Independent	Arthur Williams	116		
Majority				
Independent hold		Swing		

=== Scleddau ===
Scleddau
Party	Candidate	Votes	%	±%
Independent	Alwyn Cadwallader Luke*	291		
Liberal Democrats	David Williams	210		
Plaid Cymru	Bowen George	129		
Majority		81		
Independent hold		Swing		

=== Solva ===
Solva
Party	Candidate	Votes	%	±%
Independent	William Leslie Raymond*	442		
Labour	Mollie Roach	179		
Majority				
Independent hold		Swing		

=== Tenby North ===
Tenby North
Party	Candidate	Votes	%	±%
Plaid Cymru	Michael Williams*	463		
Independent	John Hughes	250		
Independent	Sue Lane	187		
Majority		213		
Plaid Cymru hold		Swing		

=== Tenby South ===
Tenby South
Party	Candidate	Votes	%	±%
Independent	Michael Evans	777		
Labour	Christine Brown	182		
Majority				
Independent hold		Swing		

=== The Havens ===
The Havens
Party	Candidate	Votes	%	±%
Independent	William C. Philpin	unopposed		
Independent hold		Swing		

=== Wiston ===
Wiston
Party	Candidate	Votes	%	±%
Independent	Donald Malcolm Evans	424		
Independent	John Lewis	200		
Liberal Democrats	Christopher Le Breton	155		
Majority		224		
Independent hold		Swing		

== By-elections ==
=== 2007 Pembroke St Michael by-election ===
Due to the death of the sitting councillor John Allen in July 2007, a by-election was called for the Pembroke St Michael seat. It took place on 20 November 2007, and saw Conservative candidate Aden Brinn narrowly elected as councillor ahead of Liberal Democrat candidate Gareth Jones, with a nine vote majority.

2007 Pembroke St Michael By-election
Party	Candidate	Votes	%	±%
Conservative	Aden Arthur Brinn	251	30.6	
Liberal Democrats	Gareth Jones	242	29.5	
Independent	David Owen	184	22.5	
Labour	David Edwards	142	17.3	
Majority		9		
Conservative gain from Liberal Democrats		Swing		

== Sources ==
- "Pembrokeshire County Council election results". Western Telegraph. 11 June 2004. Archived from the original on 14 December 2018.
