= Ysgol Bro Gwaun =

Secondary school in Fishguard, Pembrokshire

Coordinates: 51.996°N 4.988°W

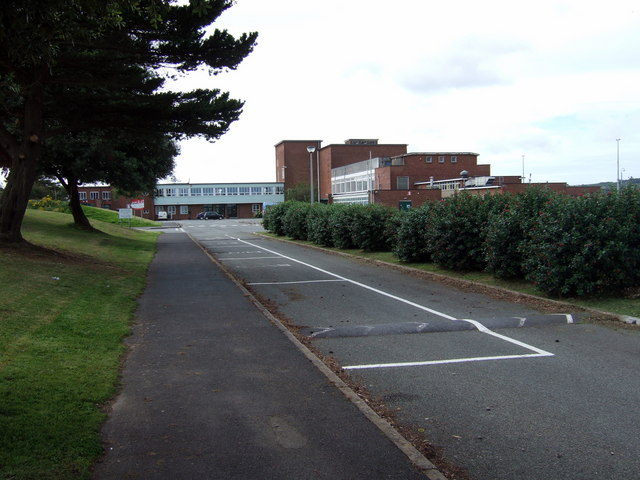

Location
- Heol Dyfed; Fishguard, Pembrokeshire, SA65 9DT; Wales

Information
- Type: Comprehensive school
- Motto: Welsh: Angori doeth, dyfodol disglair (Anchor wise, bright future)
- Head teacher: Alana Finn
- Gender: Coeducational
- Age: 11 to 17
- Enrolment: 601 (2024)
- Language: English with significant Welsh
- Website: https://ysgolbrogwaun.com/

Ysgol Bro Gwaun (formerly Fishguard County Secondary School) is a secondary comprehensive school in the town of Fishguard in north Pembrokeshire. It is a predominantly English-medium school with significant use of Welsh, and has a catchment area covering the towns of Fishguard and Goodwick, the villages of Scleddau, Letterston and Newport and the surrounding areas including the Gwaun valley. The current Head-Teacher is Miss Alana Finn.

The school was built in the 1960s because the old building (now demolished for Ysgol Glannau Gwaun) was too small. It was designed, like Sir Thomas Picton School, to be a cold war hospital in case of war.

The school currently has 617 pupils and 50 members of staff.

== School Redevelopment ==
In November 2017, a £10.9 million extension (funded jointly by the Welsh Government and Pembrokeshire County Council as part of the 21st Century Schools Programme) was officially opened. The extension - which involved the demolition of a significant amount of the previous building - provides new classrooms, designated provision for bilingual Special Educational Needs and new community facilities.

== Academic Performance ==
From 2011 to 2016, the school saw a large increase in the percentage of students obtaining at least 5 GCSE A*-C grades - rising from 62.4% in 2011 to 90.4% in 2016, thus significantly outperforming the England and Wales average of 66.6% (2016).

The school's Science results are exceptionally strong with more than 95% of students obtaining at least a C grade pass at GCSE, far exceeding the Welsh national average of 75.6%.

The school's most recent monitoring report from Estyn (the Welsh Education Inspectorate) in October 2016 stated the school was showing "strong progress", making "significant improvements" across the board.

== Competitions and Olympiads ==
The school regularly fields a team in the national Biology Challenge and British Biology Olympiad (both organised by the Institute of Biology), and has won at least one Gold award on an annual basis.

In 2014, Head of Science and Physics teacher. Robert Woodman won the 'Teachers of Physics' award from the Institute of Physics, an annual award covering the whole of the UK.

== Notable former pupils ==
- Mark Delaney (footballer) - Academy coach at Coventry City. Former professional footballer for Cardiff City, Aston Villa and Wales national football team.
- Meri Huws - Welsh Language Commissioner
- Melbourne Johns - WWII munitions factory worker whose retrieval mission to obtain crucial machinery was made into the film The Foreman Went to France
- Major Francis Jones - Historian and Wales Herald Extraordinary (1963–1993)
- Sue Jones-Davies - actress and singer
- Very Reverend Jonathan Lean - Dean of St. David's Cathedral (2009–2017)
- Josh Macleod - international Welsh Rugby Union player (Scarlets & Wales)
- Cerys Matthews - singer, radio presenter and co-founding member of Catatonia (band)
- Thomas James Stretch - Army chaplain involved in the liberation of Bergen-Belsen concentration camp in April 1945
- Sam Kurtz - Politician and former Conservative AM for Carmarthen West and South Pembrokshire
- Alis Deason - Professor of Physics, Durham University

== Notable former staff ==
- David John Williams - Co-founder of Plaid Cymru and prominent Welsh-language writer was an English and PE teacher at the school 1919–1936, and Welsh Master 1937–1945.
- Glenys Cour - Artist and member of The Welsh Group taught at the school in the 1940s
