= Michael Siddons =

Welsh genealogist (born 1928)

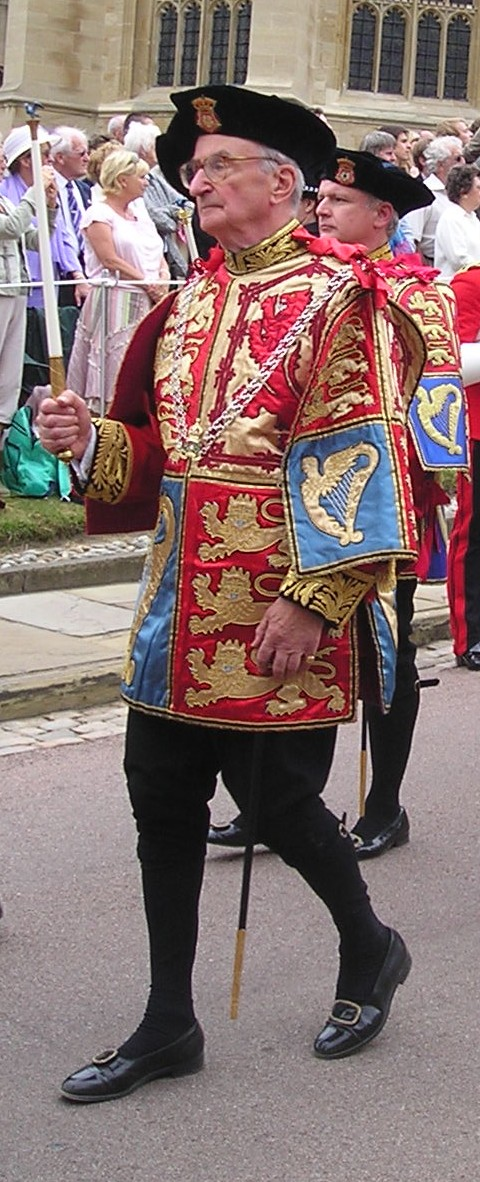
Michael Powell Siddons, Wales Herald of Arms Extraordinary

Michael Powell Siddons (born 1928) was Wales Herald of Arms Extraordinary. He was appointed in November 1994, following the death of Francis Jones and retired 30 June 2010. In addition to the publications listed below, he has authored numerous articles on heraldic and genealogical subjects. Siddons also serves as the president of the Cardiganshire Family History Society.

== Publications ==
- Michael Powell Siddons. The Development of Welsh Heraldry. (Aberystwyth, Cardiff: 1991–1993). ISBN 0-907158-51-X
- Michael Powell Siddons. Visitations by the Heralds in Wales. (The Harleian Society, London: 1996).
- Michael Powell Siddons. The Visitation of Herefordshire 1634. (The Harleian Society, London: 2002).
- Michael Powell Siddons. Welsh Pedigree Rolls. (National Library of Wales, Cardiff: 1996). ISBN 0-907158-90-0
- Michael Powell Siddons. Welsh Genealogies AD 1500-1600. (CMCS Publications, Aberystwyth: 2017). ISBN 0-993557-00-7

== Arms ==
Coat of arms of Michael Siddons
Adopted 1966 Crest An eagle's head erased per fess argent and azure in the beak a serpent vert. Escutcheon Argent on a bend cotised between two fleurs de lis azure a cinquefoil between two lions rampant or. Motto Dweddwyd Digon, Gwneud Sy'n Ol

== See also ==
- Heraldry
- Herald
