= Jemima Nicholas =

Welsh heroine

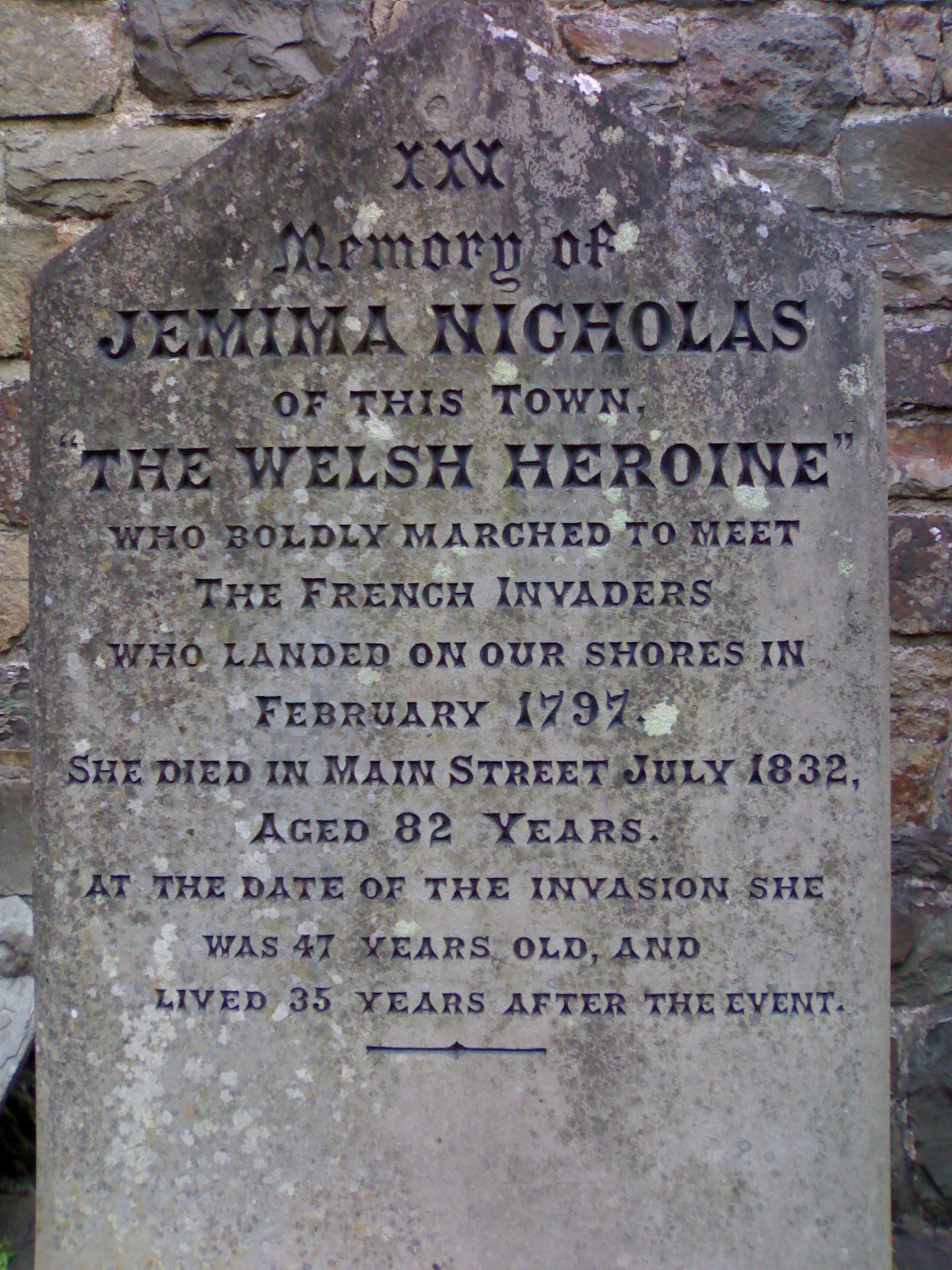
- Memorial stone for Jemima Nicholas outside St Mary's Church, Fishguard
- Born: Llanrhian, Wales
- Baptised: 2 March 1755
- Died: 16 July 1832 (aged 82); Fishguard, Wales
- Occupation(s): Cobbler, homemaker

Jemima Nicholas (also spelt Niclas; bapt. 2 March 1755 – 16 July 1832), also known as Jemima Fawr, was a Welsh heroine during the 1797 Battle of Fishguard (commonly known as the last invasion of mainland Britain).

== Early life ==
Jemima Nicholas was the daughter of Elinor and William Nicholas of Llanrhian, and was baptised on 2 March 1755 in Mathry. She was a cobbler, or a cobbler's wife.

== Battle of Fishguard ==
In 1797, 1,400 French troops, many of them drawn from prisons, sailed from Camaret and landed at Llanwnda in Wales. According to folk legend, armed with a pitchfork, Nicholas led a group of women and rounded up 12 French soldiers who had been drinking, and held them captive inside a church overnight. The French surrendered shortly afterwards at the Royal Oak pub. She was awarded a lifetime pension for her efforts.

A Jemima Nicholas was also involved with rioting in Fishguard in 1824, though she was not convicted of any crime.

== Legacy ==
Nicholas died at the age of 82 on 16 July 1832. A memorial stone was installed in the churchyard of St Mary's, Fishguard, in 1897, on the occasion of the invasion's centennial. She is featured in the Last Invasion Tapestry commissioned by the Fishguard Arts Society for the 200th anniversary of the invasion. The 100-foot-long tapestry is housed in its own gallery on the first floor of Fishguard Town Hall.

In 2019, a hat said to have belonged to Jemima Nicholas sold by one of her brother's descendants at a charity auction, for £5,000. The buyer was a distant relative who lived in Australia.

The town of Fishguard has an official Jemima Nicholas re-enactor. She was played by Yvonne Fox, until her death in 2010, and has been portrayed by Jacqui Scarr since 2013.

A children's book about Nicholas, Jemima Nicholas: Heroine of the Fishguard Invasion by Sian Lewis, was published in 2012, as part of a series on Welsh women's history.

Jemima Nicholas was included in the list of 100+ Welsh women who have made a significant contribution to Welsh life produced by WEN Wales.

In February 2024, a Purple Plaque in her memory was installed in Fishguard.
