= Fishguard & Goodwick Marina =

Planned development in Pembrokeshire, Wales

Coordinates: 52.003°N 4.992°W

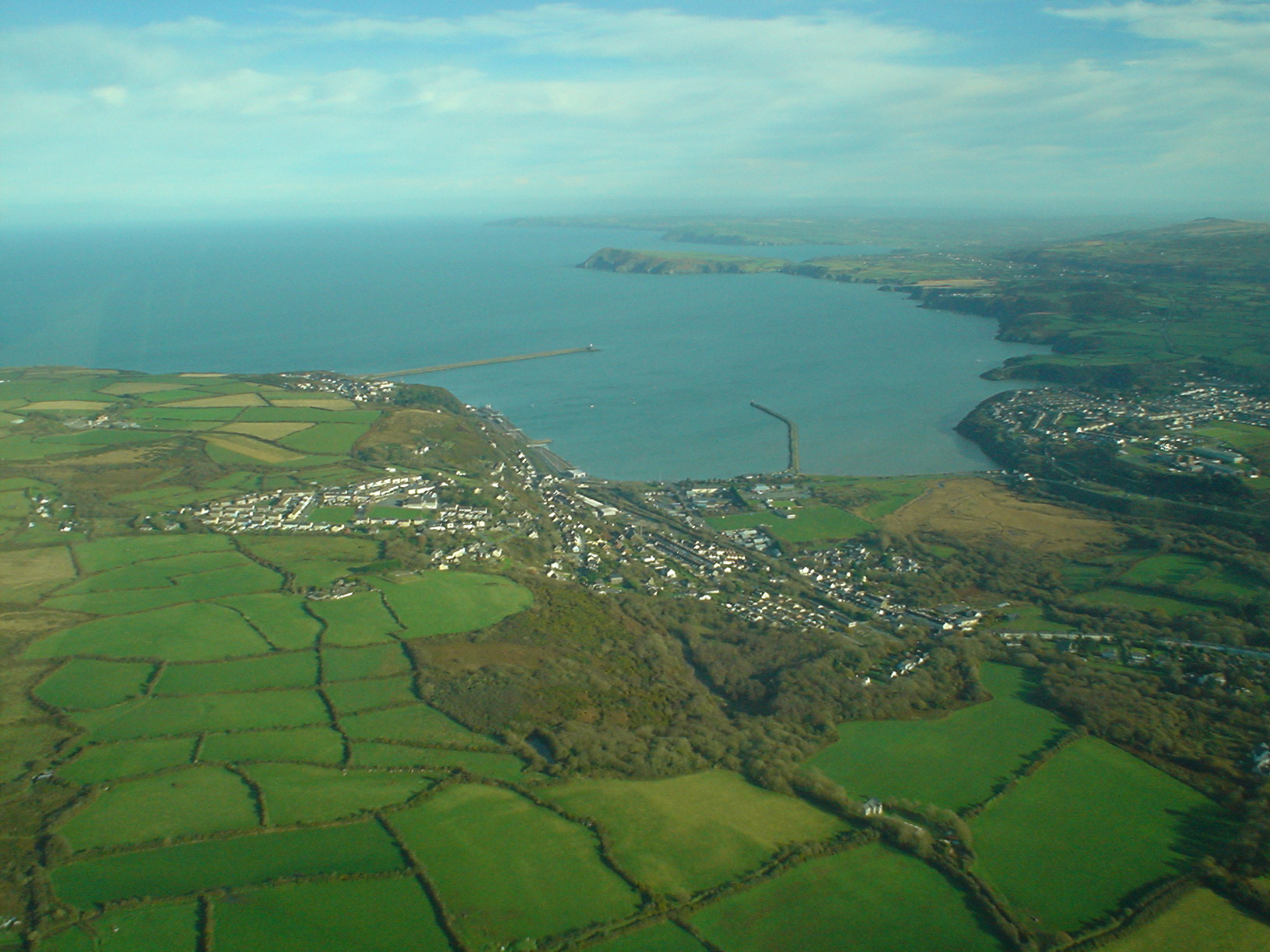
Goodwick and Fishguard from the air in 2008. The proposed development is to the left of the nearer breakwater.

The Fishguard & Goodwick Marina is a planned development within the harbour of the Welsh towns of Fishguard and Goodwick in Pembrokeshire, south-west Wales. In April 2012 Pembrokeshire County Council revealed that they had given outline planning permission for the development of a marina to be located in the small town of Goodwick within Fishguard Harbour. The initial planning application was submitted to Pembrokeshire County Council in October 2011 by Conygar who wish to invest £100 million into the project.

== Proposed development ==
The developers Conygar have been granted outline planning consent by Pembrokeshire County Council for a 450-berth marina, 253 apartments, 76 one-bed and 177 two-bedrooms, 200 sq m of shops and 500 sq m of financial and professional services; 840 sq m of restaurants and cafe space; a light industrial area, along with a boatyard, workshop and fishing stores, visitor parking and a 19-acre platform for the potential expansion of the existing Stena Line port. The scheme will also create a publicly accessible promenade and waterfront. Two breakwaters to protect the marina are also proposed. Most of the proposed new developments will be sited by reclaiming land from the sea bed within the two existing breakwaters mainly near the current 'Ocean Lab' and alongside the existing ferry terminal access roads. Conygar have also exchanged contracts to acquire an eleven-acre site for a lorry stop and distribution park on the perimeter of the Stena Line owned port.

In April 2012 Robert Ware, Chief Executive of Conygar, commented: "We are delighted that Pembrokeshire County Council has resolved to grant planning permission for our marina development at Fishguard. This now gives us the confidence to push ahead with preparing detailed proposals during the course of which we will continue to consult with all relevant parties and address any remaining issues that may still be of concern.

As a consequence of discussions with Sea Trust, a local community conservation group, and other stakeholders, our detailed planning submissions will incorporate a Landmark Visitor Centre with associated parking for cars and coaches, which we believe will attract significant numbers of all year round visitors including those travelling to and from Ireland."

Conygar also published on their website that: While plans for the Visitor Centre are still under discussion it is envisaged the centre could incorporate a Marine Aquarium, Seal Hospital and marine heritage and wildlife exhibits along with a new public slipway with an associated parking and viewing area.
