= Fishguard and Goodwick =

Community in Pembrokeshire, Wales

Fishguard and Goodwick: Welsh: Abergwaun ac Wdig
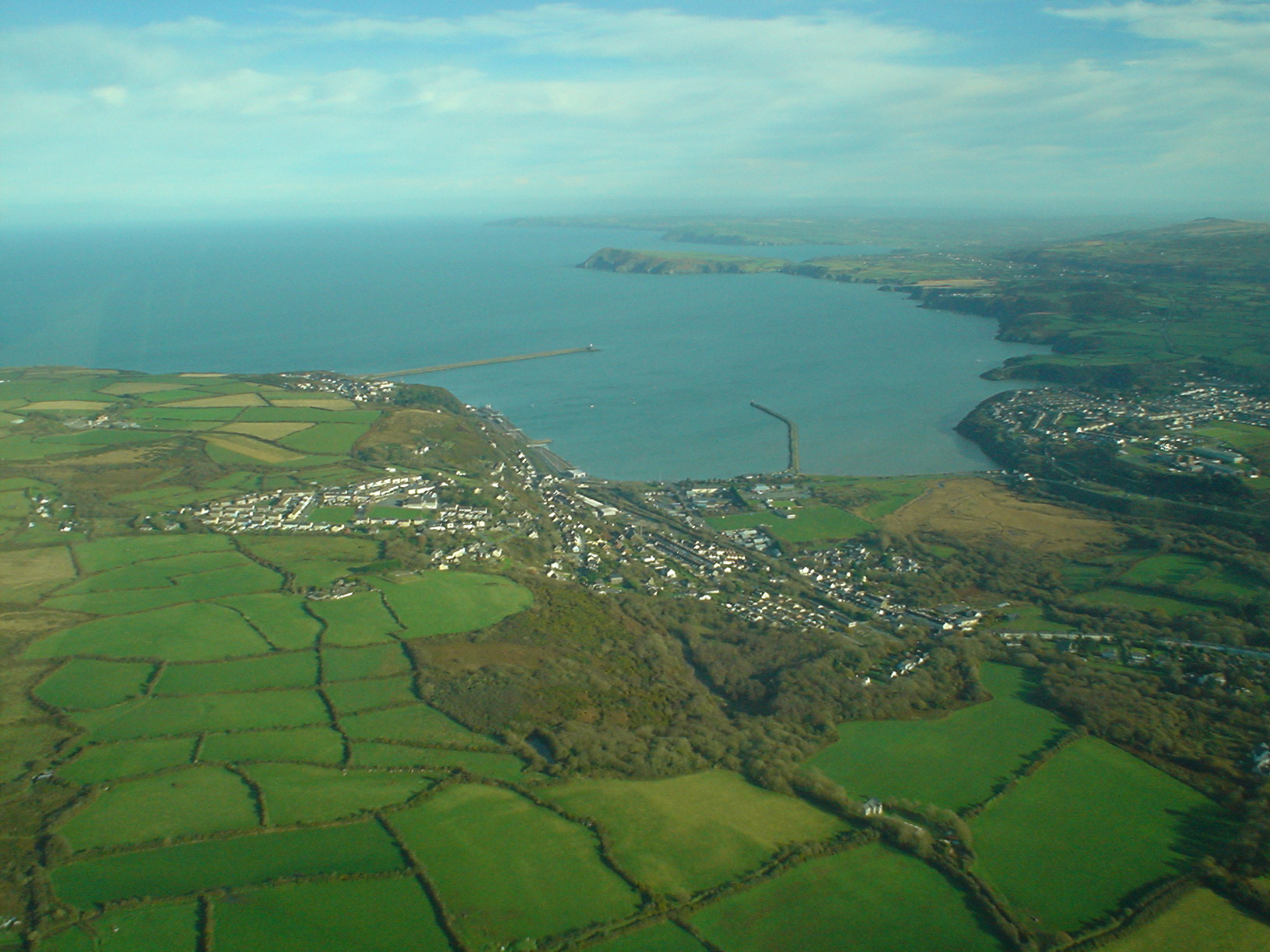
- Goodwick and Fishguard from the air
- Population: 5,407
- OS grid reference: SM949376
- Community: Fishguard and Goodwick
- Principal area: Pembrokeshire
- Preserved county: Dyfed
- Country: Wales
- Sovereign state: United Kingdom
- Post town: GOODWICK
- Postcode district: SA64
- Post town: FISHGUARD
- Postcode district: SA65
- Dialling code: 01348
- Police: Dyfed-Powys
- Fire: Mid and West Wales
- Ambulance: Welsh
- UK Parliament: Preseli Pembrokeshire
- Senedd Cymru – Welsh Parliament: Ceredigion Penfro
- Website: fishguardgoodwick-tc.gov.wales
- List of places UK Wales Pembrokeshire 51.9993°N 4.9886°W Map of the community

Fishguard and Goodwick (Welsh: Abergwaun ac Wdig) is a community that wraps around Fishguard Bay, on the northern coast of Pembrokeshire, Wales. It comprises the two towns of Fishguard and Goodwick, with their neighbourhoods of Dyffryn, Harbour Village, Penyraber, Lower Town, and Stop-and-Call. Within the community are two railway stations and Goodwick Ferry Terminal, which is the terminus of the A40 London to Fishguard Trunk Road.

== History ==
The two towns of Goodwick and Fishguard were administered separately until 1934. In that year the Fishguard Urban District and Goodwick Urban District were merged to become Fishguard and Goodwick Urban District. Fishguard and Goodwick Urban District was abolished under the Local Government Act 1972, with the area becoming part of the district of Preseli Pembrokeshire on 1 April 1974. A community covering the former urban district was established at the same time, with its council taking the name Fishguard and Goodwick Town Council.

== Governance ==
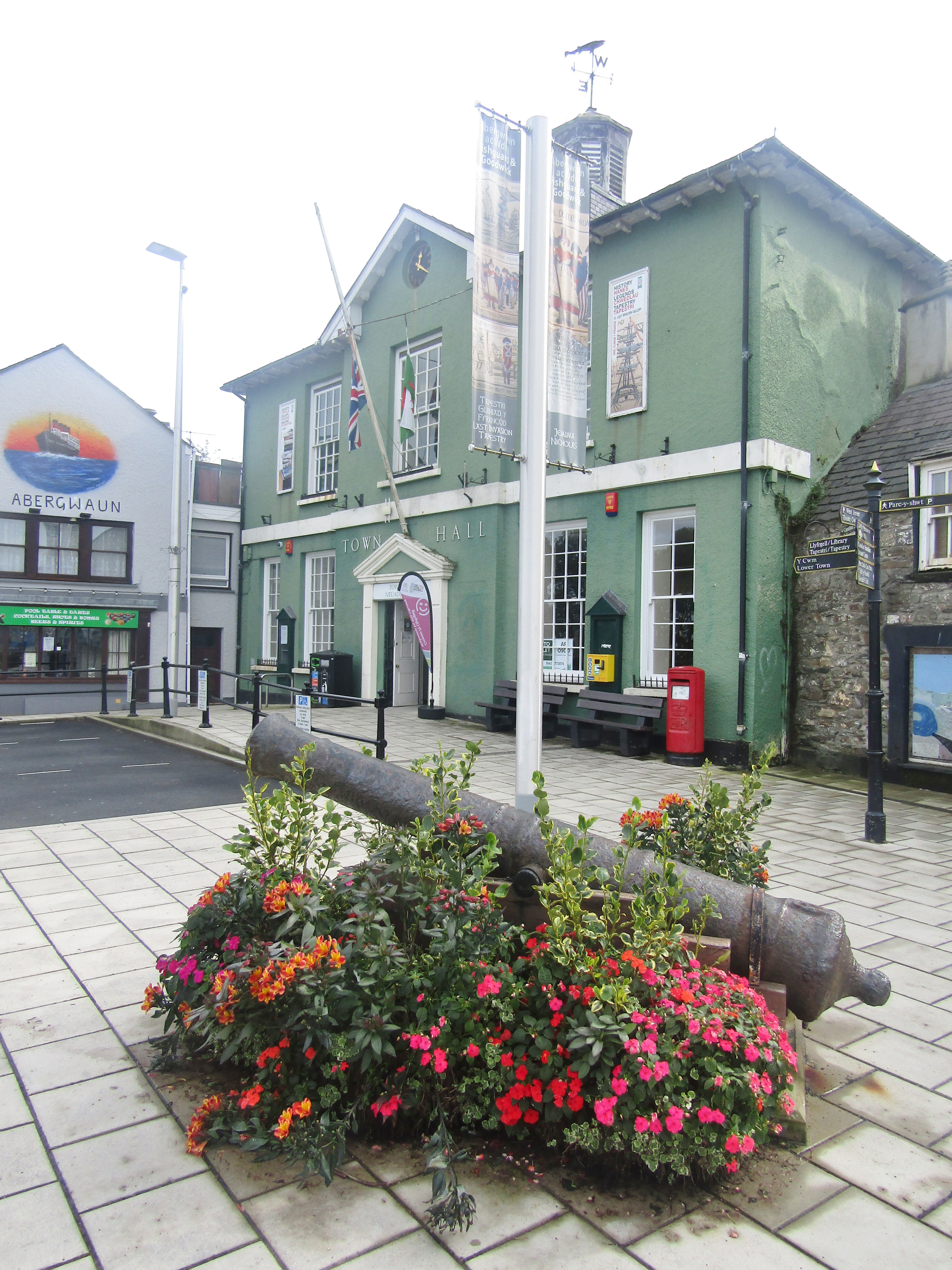
Fishguard Town Hall

The community has a council called Fishguard and Goodwick Town Council. Three wards elect a total of 14 council members: Goodwick (5), Fishguard North West (4) and Fishguard North East (5). The council elects a mayor on an annual basis from among the elected councillors. The council is based at Fishguard Town Hall in Market Square, Fishguard.

== Topography ==
The three wards take in three areas of habitation, each fronting onto a section Fishguard Bay, a sheltered bay on the north coast of Pembrokeshire, South Wales. The coastline of the bay is entirely within the community boundary. Much of the shoreline has substantial cliffs although the section between the two towns, known as the Parrog, has a wide beach and leads to an area of flat marshland, and the River Gwaun at Lower Town harbour flows from the wooded valley of Cwm Gwaun.

Goodwick ward includes the town of Goodwick on the north-east corner of the bay and Harbour Village alongside the ferry terminal. The north-west side of the bay is dominated by the major Ferry terminal at which the railway and the A40 terminate and from which two ships a day sail to Rosslare Europort, Ireland. Inland from Goodwick are the two settlements of Stop-and Call and Dyfryn. Within the bay itself are two 1 km long breakwaters ensuring safe port moorings, and between the ferry terminal and the outer breakwater is the Fishguard Lifeboat Station. North of the outer breakwater the community boundary takes in the east coast of Strumble Head including the rocky headland of Pen Anglas. The Parrog is a stretch of seafront and beach facing Fishguard bay, including the 'Ocean Lab' visitor centre, Projecting north-east from the Parrog is the inner breakwater, whilst on the inland side is Goodwick Moor Nature Reserve, 15.6 hectares (39 acres) of reed-bed and mire, home to otters and water voles, and managed by the Wildlife Trust of South and West Wales.

Fishguard North West ward has no coastline, occupying the western part of the town of Fishguard south of the A487 and west of Wallis Street. The area includes the south-western half of the historic centre of Fishguard upper town, with significant areas of housing and the Ysgol Bro Gwaun senior school, for which major rebuilding plans were announced at the end of 2015.

Fishguard North East ward includes the other half of the historic upper town core, and an area of 20th-century housing known as Penyraber, beside the cliffs of Saddle Point. It also includes the steep slopes of the Lower Town area and the quayside of the picturesque old harbour. The harbour and Lower Town were the location used by Richard Burton and Elizabeth Taylor for the 1972 film of Dylan Thomas's Under Milk Wood. The ward also includes the headland east of the town, where the A487 Fishguard to Bangor Trunk Road runs north-east out of Fishguard with sharp bends and steep gradients as it climbs up to the cliff top near Castle Point.

== Protected sites ==
Within Fishguard and Goodwick community there are a wide variety of protected sites from rocky cliffs and ancient monuments to listed buildings and three conservation areas.

=== Geology SSSI ===
Fishguard Cliffs
- Site of Special Scientific Interest
- Location within Pembrokeshire
- Location of Fishguard Cliffs.
- Area of search: Pembrokeshire
- Grid reference: SM 958375
- Coordinates: 51.9983°N 4.9760°W
- Interest: Geological
- Area: 6.7 hectares (17 acres)
- Notification date: 1954

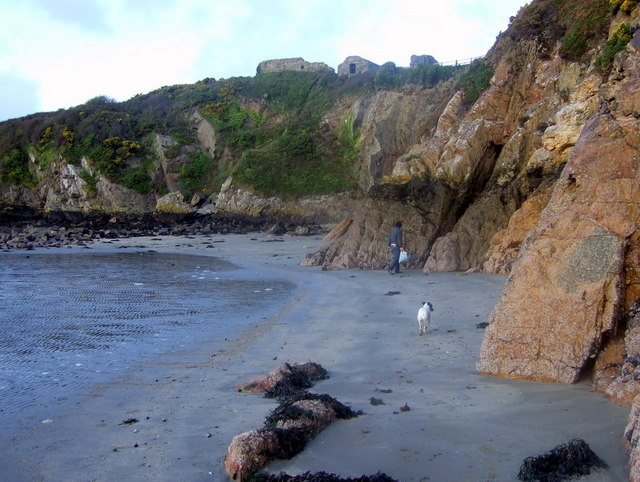
The cliffs below Castle Point

The cliffs either side of Fishguard Lower Town harbour are an SSSI notable for its geology. From Saddle Point on the western side, round to Castle Point on the eastern headland, the geology has legal protection because of its notable Ordovician pillow lava, in which the Llanvirn series is well demonstrated. Many of the rocks of Pembrokeshire have their origins some 460 million years ago in vast volcanic outpourings of ash and tuff, and more rarely flows of lava, which, as here, cooled into a number of pillow formations.

=== National Park ===
Although the Pembrokeshire Coast National Park includes almost all of the coastline, it has three gaps, of which one is Fishguard and Goodwick. Most of the Community is excluded from National Park jurisdiction. Several lengths of the Community boundary are also the boundary to the National Park, both to east and west. Only two small areas of the Community are within the National Park, these being: the Castle point headland north of the A487 to the east; And the northwest end of the community along the Pen Anglas headland of Strumble Head. For these areas, the Park is the legal Planning Authority, unlike the rest of the Community, for which Pembrokeshire County Council has that responsibility.

=== Scheduled Monuments ===
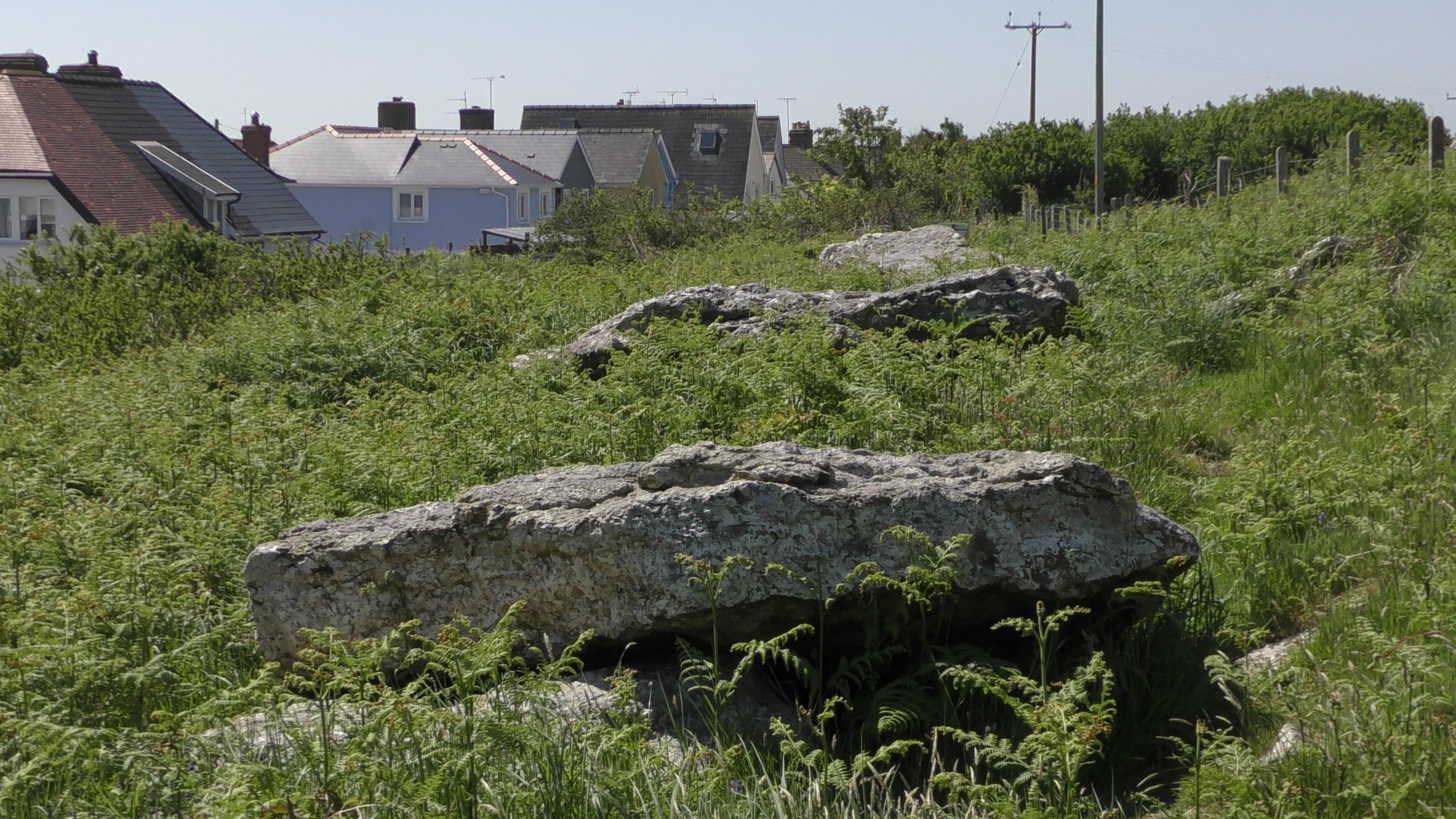
Garn Wen Cromlechs

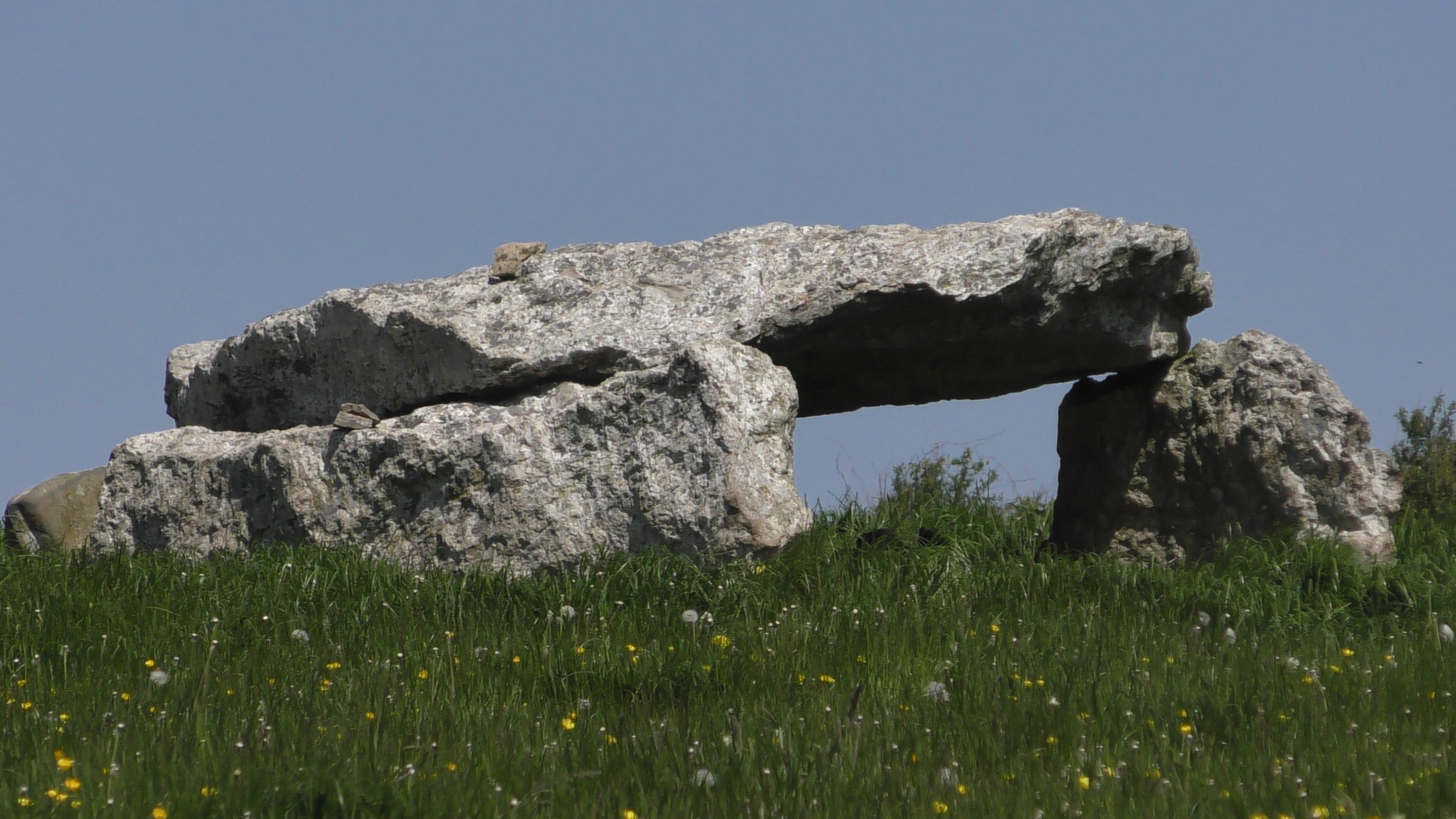
Pen Rhiw Cromlech: a broad, low-lying cromlech in a field north of Pen-rhiw farm, Goodwick.

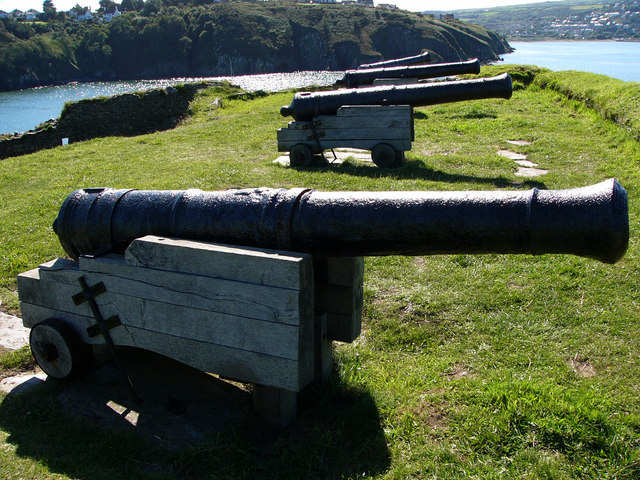
Old fort, Castle Point, Fishguard

There are three scheduled monuments in the community. Two chambered tomb sites are prehistoric, and the Old Castle is a post-medieval site:-

- Garn Wen Burial Chambers; A line of four Chambered tombs forming a Neolithic cemetery on the hillside above the ferry terminal at 52.0117°N 4.9909°W A nearby car park amongst the housing estate provides an access to the footpath that runs past them.
- Pen-Rhiw Burial Chamber: A Neolithic Cromlech with a large capstone in a grassy field north of Pen-rhiw farm, west of Goodrick at 52.0119°N 4.9999°W, (SM942390)
- Castle Point Old Fort, 52.0013°N 4.9705°W, (SM961378) was built in 1780s amidst fears of Napoleonic invasion. It now has a selection of canons housed on the ramparts.

=== Listed buildings ===
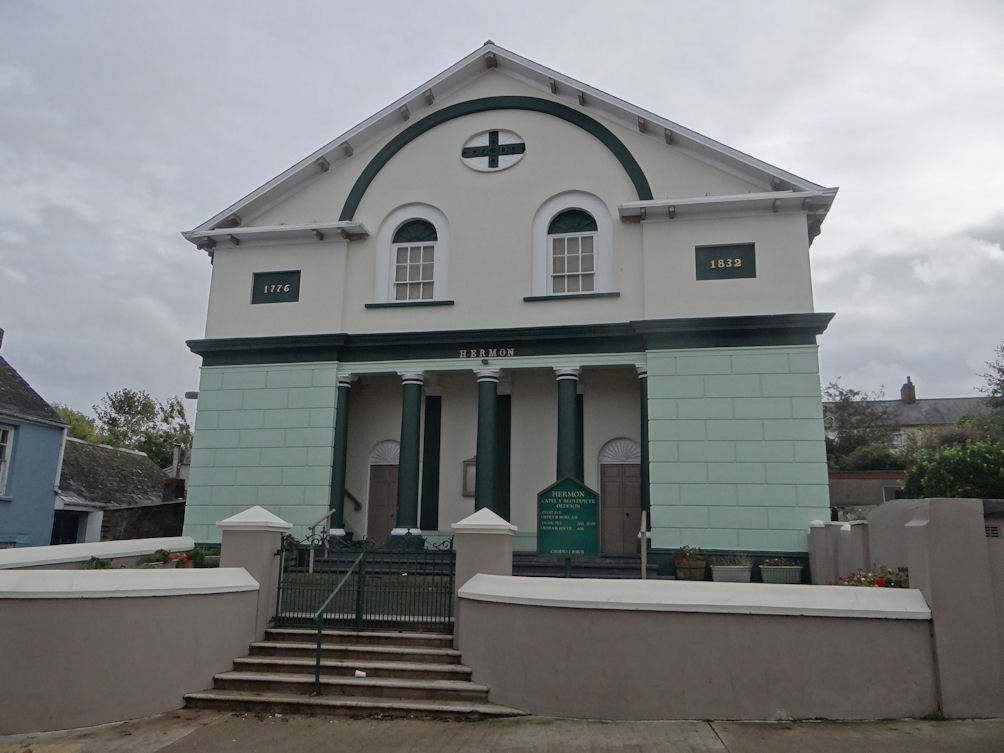
Hermon Baptist Church, Fishguard

Two buildings within the community are listed grade II*.

- Plas Glyn-y-Mel is a country house (subsequently a hotel) built in 1797–1799 for Richard Fenton, a Pembrokeshire historian and poet. The house stands at the south end of Glyn-y-Mel Road in Lower Town.
- Herman Baptist Church is the earliest known Welsh example of a wide arch breaking into an open pediment - a feature that came to dominate non-conformist chapel facades across Wales by the mid-19th century. This facade also features four Doric pillars over a central porch. The chapel was built in 1832, designed by either Daniel Evans or his father David Evans of Fishguard. The interior is also substantially from 1832, with three-sided gallery, wooden pillars and box-pews. The Chapel stands on the south side of High Street

There are also 161 grade II listed buildings across the two towns, including shops, houses, churches, inns and public buildings. The largest density of these is in Fishguard town centre, which has 112, particularly along the Market Square and Main Street, Hill Terrace, Tower Hill and Hamilton Street, with another heavy cluster along High Street and West Street. It includes several terraces on Park Street and Nottipass Street. The Lime kilns on The Slade and farm buildings at Maesgwynne are also listed. In Fishguard Lower Town there are a further 35 grade II buildings, mostly harbour-side cottages, clustered around Quay Street, Bridge Street, Newport Road and Glyn-y-mel Road. In Goodwick there are 14 listed buildings, particularly in the centre, including the Lifeboat memorial, Institute, two churches and several houses and cottages.

=== Conservation Areas ===
This community has 3 of Pembrokeshire's 24 Conservation areas. These afford a wide-area protection for the special character of an area, regulating the building construction and alterations within the protected area and influencing the landscaping of outdoor spaces. The three areas match closely to the three historic settlement cores, and to the clusterings of the listed buildings. All three conservation areas were first drawn up in 1976, had a revision in 1992 and an appraisal in 2016.

Lower Town Fishguard Conservation Area: Lower Town is thought to be oldest of the three settlements, growing up around the old harbour. The 2016 conservation area appraisal affirms the maritime history and coastal landscape as key significant features, and the resulting narrow streets, quayside buildings, constrained building plots and separation from the rest of Fishguard give it the picturesque value that the conservation area management plan seeks to protect and enhance. The conservation area is 19.23 hectares (47.5 acres) and covers the quay and hillside to the north, along the Gwaun valley, and adjoins the Fishguard Conservation Area where the main road climbs up from lower to upper town

Fishguard Conservation Area (upper town): The special characteristics identified in the 2016 appraisal included the dramatic coastal setting, the mix of buildings from the 17th, 18th and 19th centuries, the marketplace with radial streets, historic shop fronts, narrow streets and alleyways and the extreme topography separating the upper and lower towns. The town had a medieval origin and Norman castle, but its prosperity increased as fishing and coastal trade increased through the 17th and 18th centuries. The sheltered harbour served both trading vessels and those travelling to Ireland, and allowed ancillary industries such as boatbuilding and rope-making to thrive, and the townscape retains many elements from that period of prosperity. 18.35 hectares (45.3 acres) of the historic core of the town and the former industrial area of The Slade, leading down to the shoreline, are included in the conservation area.

Goodwick Conservation Area: Goodwick as a settlement saw its period of growth into a town later than Fishguard. Although a maritime history and coastal setting are noted as significant in defining its special character, it is the period of late 19th- and early-20th-century growth that defines the town's character. With the 1906 arrival of the railway, and the use of Goodwick Harbour for trans-Atlantic liners, Goodwick had a fashionable heyday in the Edwardian period, and the Victorian and Edwardian shops are identified as being key parts of Goodwick's character. The Conservation Area covers 29.53 hectares (73.0 acres) including the town centre and the residential streets on the hillside northwest of the railway and ferry terminal.

== See also ==
- List of Scheduled Monuments in Pembrokeshire
- Stena Line
