= Francis Jones (historian) =

Major Francis Jones CVO, TD, DL, FSA, MA, KStJ (5 July 1908 – 14 December 1993) was an author, archivist, historian and officer of arms.

== Early and private life ==
Born in Trefin, Pembrokeshire, Francis Jones was educated at Fishguard County School (now Ysgol Bro Gwaun), and eventually became a schoolmaster. He began to work on the county records held at Haverfordwest in 1931 and he made a report to the county council in 1936. He then secured an appointment in the National Library of Wales, 1936–1939. Following war service and subsequent work on the official history of the Sicilian and Italian campaigns, he was appointed the first County Archivist of Carmarthenshire, serving from 1958 to 1973. He had married Ethel Charles in 1932: they had two sons and two daughters. Jones died in Carmarthen in 1993 aged 85 and was commemorated at the Church of St Benet Paul's Wharf, a Welsh Anglican church in the City of London which has been the religious home of the College of Arms since 1555.

== Military career ==
Jones was commissioned into 4th Battalion, The Welch Regiment, but was subsequently transferred to the Pembroke Yeomanry. He entered active service in 1939, and later took part in the North African landings and Battle of Beja, for which he was mentioned in despatches. He later fought in the Sicilian campaign and landing, then after landing at Salerno fought in the Italian campaign up to the Battle of Monte Cassino as second in command of the regiment. He was subsequently posted as a General Staff Officer to the War Cabinet Offices, Historical Section, where he wrote the Official War Record for the Sicilian and Italian Campaigns. He was later appointed Battery Commander in the Surrey Yeomanry (Queen Mary's Regiment).

== Heraldic career ==
In 1963 the office of Wales Herald of Arms Extraordinary was revived, in anticipation of the investiture of Prince Charles as Prince of Wales, and Francis Jones appointed. (The last recorded reference to a Wales Herald was in the late fourteenth century.) In this capacity he was on the Earl Marshal's staff for the State funeral of Winston Churchill, and officiated at the investiture of the Prince of Wales in 1969. Over the next 30 years he participated in State ceremonial with the officers of arms in ordinary of the College of Arms on occasions such as the State Opening of Parliament and the Garter service.

== Writing career ==
Jones was a prolific writer with several hundred articles, essays and books published. He also appeared on BBC radio and television programs.

His main published works include

- The Holy Wells of Wales (1954)
- God bless the Prince of Wales: four essays for investiture year, 1969. (1969) ISBN 0-9500534-0-6
- The Princes and principality of Wales (1969) ISBN 0-900768-20-7
- Historic Carmarthenshire Homes and their Families (1987) ISBN 0-906972-02-7
- A catalogue of Welsh manuscripts in the College of Arms (1988) ISBN 0-9500207-9-6
- Historic houses of Pembrokeshire and their families (1996) ISBN 0-9528344-0-5
- Treasury of historic Pembrokeshire (1998) ISBN 0-9528344-2-1
- Historic Cardiganshire Homes and their families (2000) ISBN 0-9528344-4-8
- Treasury of historic Carmarthenshire (2002) ISBN 0-9528344-6-4

== Honours and appointments ==
Jones received the Territorial Decoration with three clasps for his military service. He was created a Commander of the Royal Victorial Order and Knight of the Order of St John. He was also a Fellow of the Society of Antiquaries and received an Honorary Master of Arts degree from the University of Wales.

Among the many other positions he held and societies to which he belonged were:

- Deputy Lieutenant Dyfed
- Vice-President Dyfed Local Council
- Governor of the National Library of Wales
- Carmarthenshire County Archivist 1958-1973
- Member of Gorsedd
- Member of the Historical Society of the Church in Wales
- President of the Cambrian Archaeological Society
- Carmarthenshire History Association
- Pembrokeshire Record Society
- Croeso '69 Committee
- Académie Internationale d'Héraldique
- The Heraldry Society
- Honourable Society of Cymmrodorion
- Honorary Member of Mark Twain Society, USA

== Arms ==
Coat of arms of Francis Jones
Escutcheon Party per pale azure and gules, three lions rampant argent.
