= Melbourne Johns =

British factory worker

Melbourne Thomas Johns (9 March 1901 – 7 August 1955) was a Welsh-born munitions factory worker who became known for having taken part in a World War II mission in France aimed at retrieving several pieces of machinery of military strategic value ahead of the German invasion.

== Early life ==
Johns was born just outside the village of Hundleton, near Pembroke, in 1901, later attending Fishguard County School (now Ysgol Bro Gwaun).

== Career ==
As an adult he moved to work in munition factories in England, often in Grantham.

Sometime soon after the start of the war, he was working at the BMARC munitions factory in Grantham. Johns volunteered to go with a team to recover very important Deep Hole Boring Machines at the Hispano-Suiza works in Bois-Colombes, France, against his bosses' wishes, before the invading Germans could get hold of them. Johns and the soldiers found the factory deserted, loaded the equipment onto a lorry and drove it away. They took it back to England.

The Deep Hole Boring Machines were used for drilling the barrels of the Hispano-Suiza HS.404 20mm cannon that armed Spitfires and Hurricane fighters.

He had worked at the REME workshop in Newark-on-Trent.

== Depiction in film ==
His exploits were captured in Ealing Studios' 1942 film The Foreman Went to France (retitled as Somewhere in France in the United States), starring Tommy Trinder, Robert Morley, Gordon Jackson and Constance Cummings, with Welsh actor Clifford Evans playing Melbourne Johns.

== Personal life ==
He married Catherine Williams in 1930. He moved to Grantham in 1938, and lived at 63 North Parade, his wife was a local teacher.

He died at Newark Hospital, after 10 days of illness. The cremation was at Leicester on Wednesday 10 August 1955.
