= Meri Huws =

Welsh academic (born 1957)

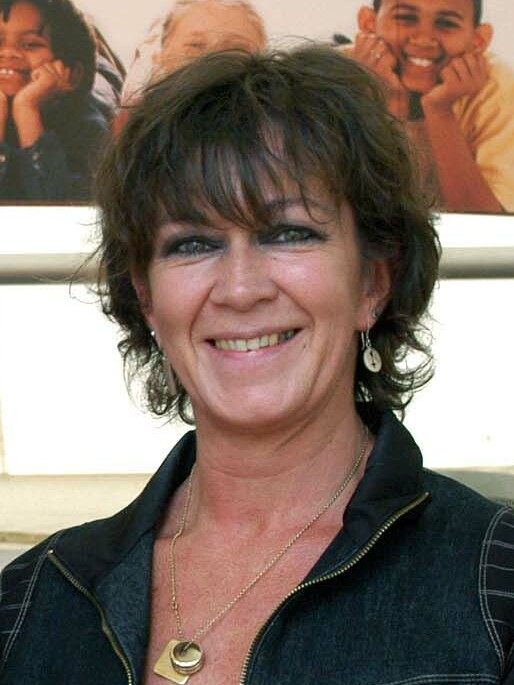
- Huws in 2004
- Born: September 1957 (age 68); Carmarthenshire, Wales
- Education: Ysgol Bro Gwaun
- Alma mater: University of Wales, Aberystwyth
- Political party: Labour

Meri Huws (born September 1957) is a Welsh academic and public official and formerly the Welsh Language Commissioner. Born in Carmarthenshire, she was educated at Ysgol Bro Gwaun, University of Wales, Aberystwyth, where she studied law and politics, and the University of Oxford, where she studied to be a social worker. She was the head of the Lifelong Learning Department at Bangor University, and deputy vice-chancellor.

== Biography ==
She was chair of The Welsh Language Society from 1981 to 1983, and was a member of the Welsh Language Board between 1993 and 1997. She is a member of the Labour Party.

She was Chairman of the Welsh Language Board from 2004 until the Board was abolished in March 2012. Her appointment in this role caused some controversy when it was revealed that she was a former partner of Andrew Davies, who at the time was Minister for Economic Development in the Welsh Government. The matter was raised by Plaid Cymru Representative Owen John Thomas, who complained that Ms Huws had failed to declare a conflict of interest and had been favoured by Culture Minister Alun Pugh over other interviewees. In 2012, Meri Huws was appointed the first Welsh Language Commissioner and her appointment came to an end in March 2019.

In April 2020 Huws was appointed interim President of the National Library of Wales, becoming the first woman to hold the post of President in the Library's history. She resigned from the position in August 2021.
