= Goodwick (electoral ward) =

Electoral division in Pembrokeshire, Wales

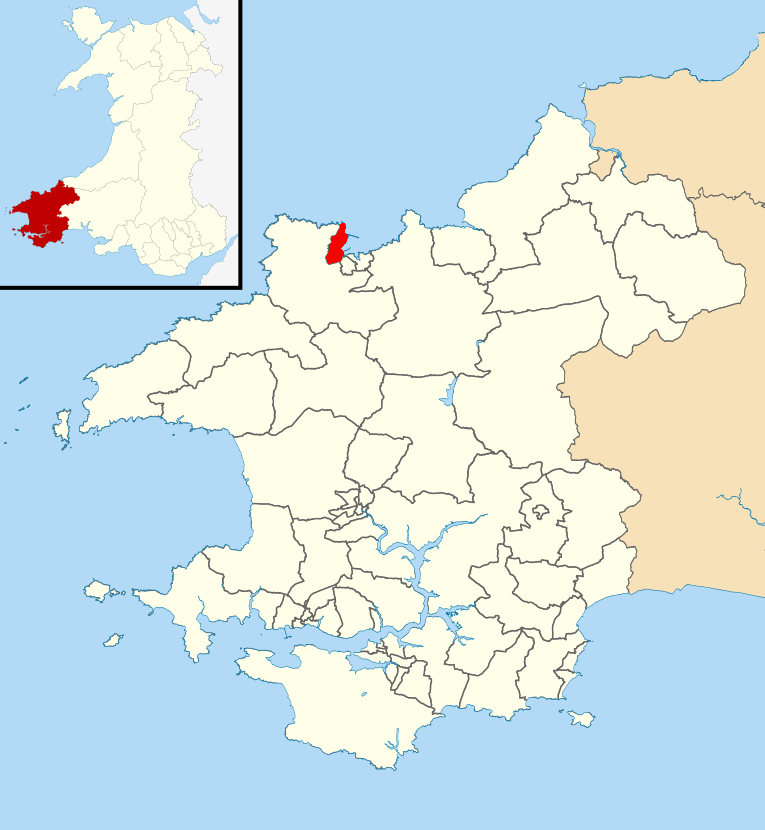
Location of Goodwick ward in the north of Pembrokeshire

Goodwick is an electoral ward in Pembrokeshire, Wales, covering the town of the same name (part of the community of Fishguard and Goodwick). The ward elects a councillor to Pembrokeshire County Council. Six councillors are elected to the Fishguard and Goodwick Town Council.

According to the 2011 UK Census the population of the ward was 1,988 (with 1,574 of voting age).

== History ==
In May 2017 sitting county councillor Gwilym Price lost to an independent candidate Kevin Doolin.

2017 Pembrokeshire County Council election
Party	Candidate	Votes	%	±%
Independent	Kevin Doolin	262		
Labour	Gwilym Price	234		
Liberal Democrats	Richard Grosvenor	122		

At the May 2012 election, Plaid Cymru county councillor Moira Lewis lost her seat to the Welsh Labour candidate, describing the contest as "vicious".

2012 Pembrokeshire County Council election
Party	Candidate	Votes	%	±%
Labour	Gwilym Price	238		
Plaid Cymru	Moira Lewis	169		
Conservative	James Jonathon Thickitt	149		
Liberal Democrats	Richard John Grosvenor	119		
