= Fishguard Town Hall =

Municipal Building in Fishguard, Wales

- Neuadd y Dref Abergwaun (Welsh)
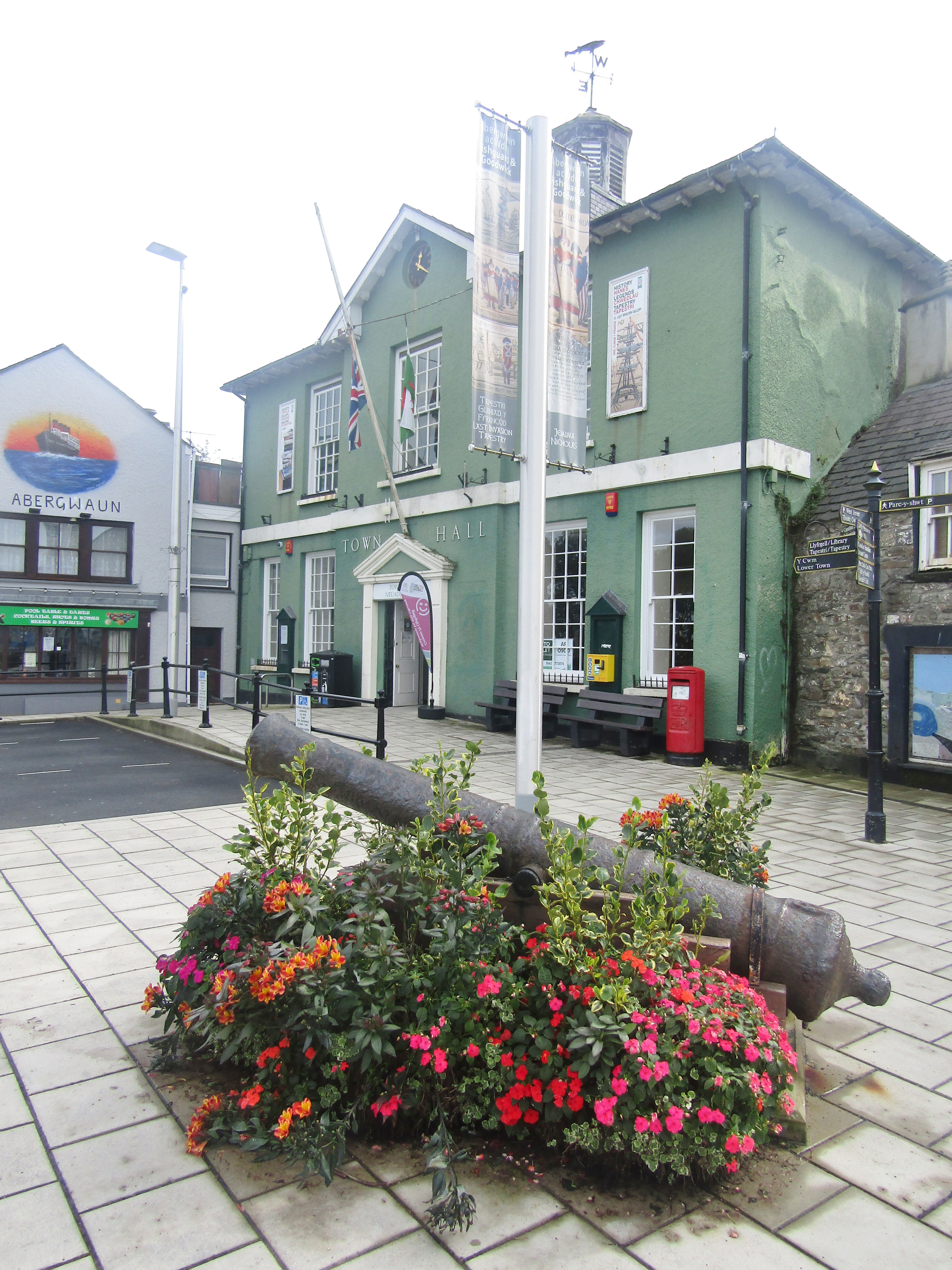
- Fishguard Town Hall

- Shown in Pembrokeshire
- 51.9937°N 4.9758°W
- Location: Market Square, Fishguard

History
- Built: 1830

Site notes
- Architectural style: Neoclassical style

Listed Building – Grade II
- Official name: The Town Hall
- Designated: 30 May 1951
- Reference no.: 12316

Fishguard Town Hall (Welsh: Neuadd y Dref Abergwaun) is a municipal building in the Market Square, Fishguard, Pembrokeshire, Wales. The structure, which is the meeting place of Fishguard and Goodwick Town Council, is a Grade II listed building.

== History ==
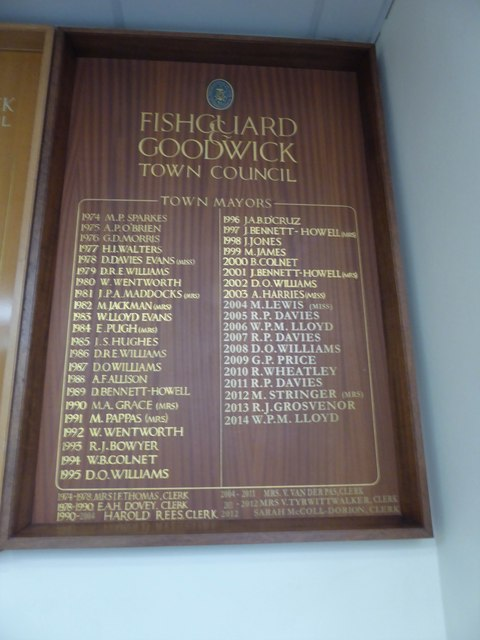
List of mayors inside the town hall

In the 1820s, in anticipation of the passing of an act of parliament authorising the establishment of a market in the town, the civic leaders decided to commission a market hall. The new building was designed in the neoclassical style, built in painted roughcast and was completed in around 1830.

The design involved a symmetrical main frontage with five bays facing onto the Market Square. The central bay, which slightly projected forward, featured a doorway flanked by pilasters supporting a pediment; there was a sash window on the first floor and an open pediment above. The other bays on the ground floor originally contained shop fronts and, on the first floor, the bays on either side of the central bay contained sash windows. At roof level, there was a central octagonal lantern with louvred sides surmounted by an ogee-shaped dome and a weather vane. Internally, the principal rooms were the market hall on the ground floor and the council chamber on the first floor.

The borough council, which had not met for many years, was formally abolished under the Municipal Corporations Act 1883. The main pediment was augmented by the installation of a clock in the tympanum as part of the celebrations for the Golden Jubilee of Queen Victoria in 1887. Following significant population growth, largely associated with the fishing industry, Fishguard became an urban district with the town hall as its meeting place in 1907. The urban district was enlarged in 1934 to include neighbouring Goodwick, becoming Fishguard and Goodwick Urban District.

An extensive programme of improvement works to the building, involving the removal of the shop fronts and the installation of additional sash windows, was completed in the 1950s. The town hall continued to serve as the meeting place of the urban district council for much of the 20th century, but ceased to be the local seat of government when the enlarged Preseli Pembrokeshire District Council was formed in 1974. Instead it became the meeting place of Fishguard and Goodwick Town Council. A cannon, of the type used to defend Fishguard Fort in the 18th century and which had been used as a mooring point in Lower Town harbour for nearly two centuries, was installed outside the town hall in about 1980.

In 1993, the Fishguard Arts Society started embroidering a large wall hanging in the style of the Bayeux Tapestry to depict the events of the Battle of Fishguard when French troops landed under the cover of darkness at Carreg Wastad Point during the War of the First Coalition: the completed tapestry was unveiled in St Mary's Church Hall on 22 February 1997. After the completion of a further programme of refurbishment works at the town hall, the tapestry, which had been removed from the church hall and placed in storage into 2002, was put on display in a permanent purpose-built gallery on the first floor of the town hall in July 2007. At the same time, the local public library was relocated from premises on the High Street into an adjacent room of the town hall.

A plaque was unveiled in the town hall to commemorate the life of the locally-born British Heavyweight Champion, Bill Garnon, in March 2008.
