= Wales Herald Extraordinary =

Royal Herald with ceremonial duties

- The heraldic badge of Wales Herald of Arms Extraordinary
- Heraldic tradition: Gallo-British
- Jurisdiction: England, Wales and Northern Ireland
- Governing body: College of Arms

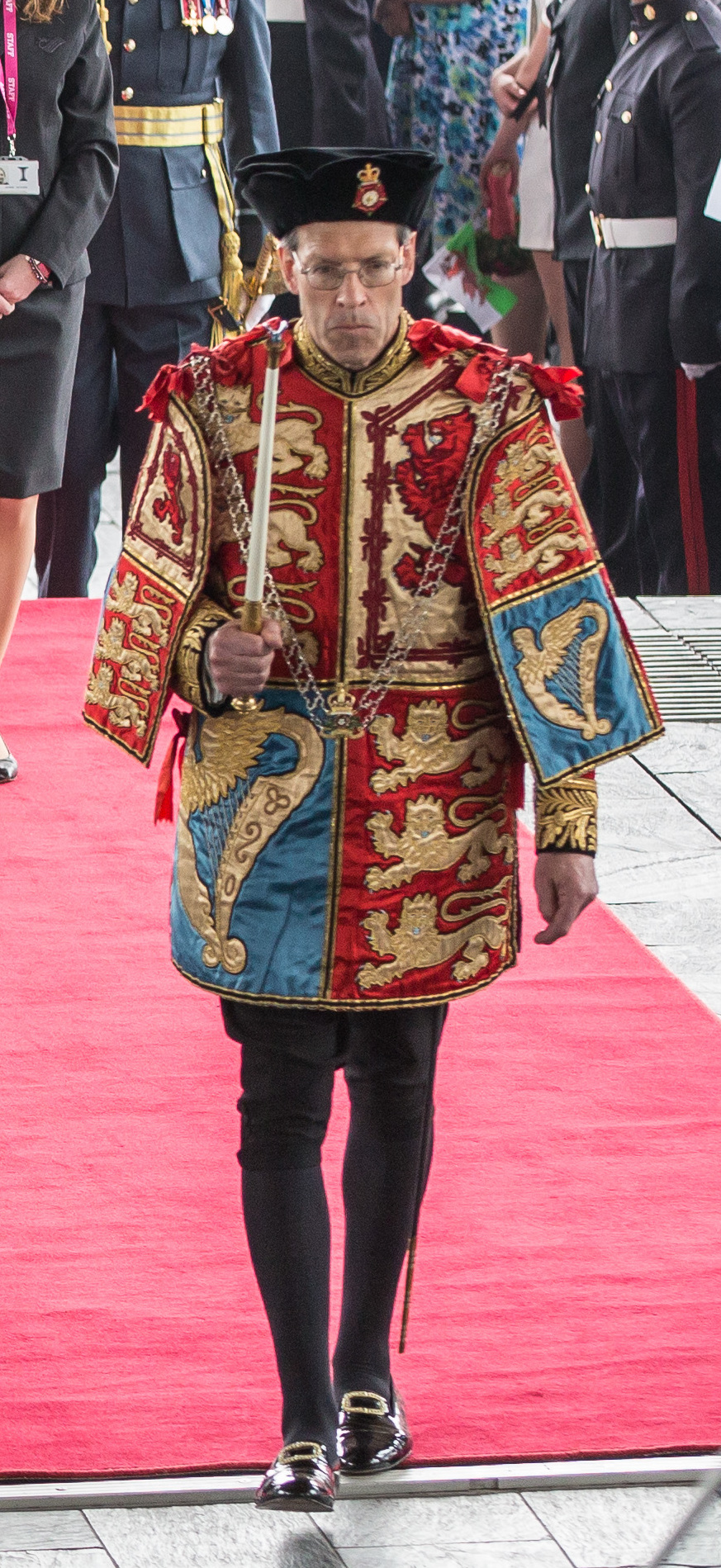
Thomas Lloyd, current Wales Herald

Wales Herald of Arms Extraordinary (Welsh: Herodr Arbennig Cymru) is a current Officer of Arms Extraordinary under the Courts of England and Wales' jurisdiction. Wales is a Royal Herald, i.e. a member of the Royal Household, and while not being a member of chapter of the College of Arms, processes with the other heralds at ceremonial occasions. Wales Herald forms an integral part of the procession when the British monarch officially opens a session of the Senedd (Welsh Parliament; Welsh: Senedd Cymru) at Cardiff Bay.

There was formerly a Wales Herald in the late 14th century, but that office was short-lived. The post was re-established in 1963 as an Officer of Arms Extraordinary, its first appointee being Francis Jones.

The badge dates from 1967 and depicts a treasured medieval Welsh possession, the Croes Naid—a cross heavily gilded and jewelled and said to contain a fragment of the True Cross of Jesus Christ; it is blazoned Issuant from an open Royal Crown of the 13th century Or a representation of a Croes Naid also Or jewelled Proper.

The present Wales Herald of Arms Extraordinary is Thomas Lloyd, OBE, DL, FSA, having succeeded Michael Siddons in 2010.

== Holders of the office ==
Arms	Name	Date of appointment	Ref
	Francis Jones	9 August 1963 – 1993	
	Michael Siddons	2 November 1994 – 2010	
	Thomas Owen Saunders Lloyd	30 June 2010 – Present	

== See also ==
- Herald
- Welsh heraldry
