= Thomas James Stretch =

British priest and army chaplain (1915–1973)

The Reverend Thomas James Stretch (17 January 1915 – 12 October 1973) was one of the first people to enter the Bergen-Belsen concentration camp when it was liberated by British troops in 1945. He commented that never in his life had he seen such damnable ghastliness.

== Biography ==
T. J. Stretch was born in Goodwick, Pembrokeshire in Wales on 17 January 1915; his father was Thomas George Stretch, a dock porter. He attended Fishguard County Secondary School (now Ysgol Bro Gwaun) before commencing studies at St. David's College, Lampeter in October 1934. He worked as priest at Holy Trinity Church, Aberystwyth and as army chaplain with 10 Garrison Detachment (Military Government) As the first army chaplain to enter Bergen-Belsen, he distributed food and clothing to the survivors and helped bury 20,000 dead. He appears in a film made by British troops on liberating the camp in April 1945 in which he recounts his impressions of the camp. Following the war, Stretch returned to parochial ministry. He served first at Chatburn, before moving on to Preston and then Poulton le Fylde, Lancashire; he died at Lytham, Lancashire.
