= The Foreman Went to France =

- Original UK quad format poster
- Directed by: Charles Frend
- Screenplay by: Leslie Arliss; John Dighton; Angus MacPhail
- Story by: J. B. Priestley
- Produced by: Michael Balcon
- Starring: Clifford Evans; Tommy Trinder; Constance Cummings; Gordon Jackson
- Cinematography: Wilkie Cooper
- Edited by: Robert Hamer
- Music by: William Walton
- Production company: Ealing Studios
- Distributed by: United Artists Ltd (UK)
- Release date: 22 June 1942 (UK)
- Running time: 87 minutes
- Country: United Kingdom
- Language: English
- Budget: $562,000

The Foreman Went to France (released in the USA as Somewhere in France) is a 1942 British Second World War war film starring Clifford Evans, Tommy Trinder, Constance Cummings and Gordon Jackson.

It was based on the real-life wartime exploits of Welsh engineer and munitions worker Melbourne Johns, who rescued machinery used to make guns for Spitfires and Hurricanes. It was an Ealing Studios film made in 1941 with the support of the War Office and the Free French Forces. All of the 'heroes' are portrayed as ordinary people caught up in the war.

== Plot ==
In 1940, Welsh armaments factory foreman Fred Carrick goes to France on his own initiative to retrieve three large pieces of machinery for making cannon for Spitfires before the German army arrives. In Bivary, he requests the aid of two soldiers and, more importantly, the use of their army lorry. He also gets the help of the company secretary in France, an American woman who needs to go north to find her sister, a nurse.

While in France, Carrick learns about the role of the fifth column, and that even those in positions of authority, such as the town mayor, cannot always be trusted. During the race to the coast with the machines, he encounters a huge number of refugees fleeing the advancing Nazis and many more obstacles to hinder his progress. They take half-a-dozen orphaned children on their journey, entertaining the children with humorous songs.

== Cast ==
- Clifford Evans as Fred Carrick, the foreman
- Tommy Trinder as Tommy Hoskins
- Constance Cummings as Anne Stafford the American
- Robert Morley as Mayor Coutare of Bivary
- Gordon Jackson as Alastair 'Jock' MacFarlane
- Ernest Milton as the stationmaster in La Tour
- Charles Victor as the aircraft spotter on the Works roof
- John Williams as the 'English' army captain
- Paul Bonifas as the Prefect of Rouville
- Anita Palacine as a La Tour barmaid
- Francis L. Sullivan as a French skipper
- Mervyn Johns as Official, Passport Office
- Sidney Adams as Driver
- Owen Reynolds as Collins, Burns & Fawcett Works Manager
- Ronald Adam as Sir Charles Fawcett, Managing Director in Wales
- Eric Maturin as Older Man (uncredited)

== Production ==
Filmed during the war, location shooting for the scenes set in France was done in Cornwall, Kent, and Berkshire. Filming took 12 months as it was continually interrupted by blitzes.

== Reception ==
Dr. Keith M. Johnston, lecturer in Film & Television Studies at the University of East Anglia, described it as "a strange little propaganda piece, a flashback-structured film that dramatises the 'true' story of Melbourne Johns ... Overall, this is a nicely done little film, but it survives largely because of a committed cast and some strong narrative elements."

According to Kinematograph Weekly the film was one of the most popular movies at the British box office in June 1942.
