= Fishguard =

Town in Pembrokeshire, Wales

Coordinates: 51.9982°N 4.98041°W

Fishguard: Welsh: Abergwaun
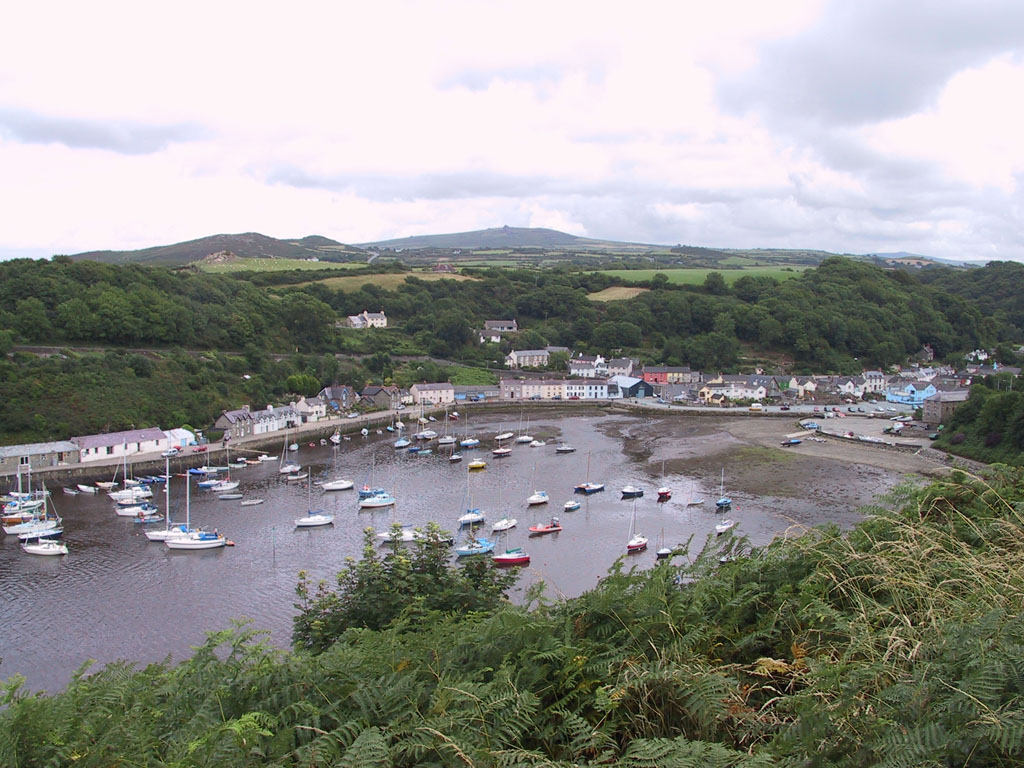
- Lower Fishguard

- Location within Pembrokeshire
- Population: 3,400 (2021 census)
- OS grid reference: SM955375
- Community: Fishguard and Goodwick
- Principal area: Pembrokeshire
- Preserved county: Dyfed
- Country: Wales
- Sovereign state: United Kingdom
- Post town: FISHGUARD
- Postcode district: SA65
- Dialling code: 01348
- Police: Dyfed-Powys
- Fire: Mid and West Wales
- Ambulance: Welsh
- UK Parliament: Ceredigion Preseli
- Senedd Cymru – Welsh Parliament: Ceredigion Penfro

Fishguard (Welsh: Abergwaun, meaning 'Mouth of the River Gwaun') is a coastal town in Pembrokeshire, Wales, with a population of 3,400 (rounded to the nearest 100) as of the 2021 census. Modern Fishguard consists of two parts, Lower Fishguard and the "Main Town". Fishguard and Goodwick are twin towns with a joint Town Council.

Lower Fishguard is believed to be the site of the original hamlet from which modern Fishguard has grown. In a deep valley where the River Gwaun meets the sea, hence the Welsh name for Fishguard. It is a typical fishing village with a short tidal quay. The settlement stretches along the north slope of the valley.

The main town contains the parish church, the High Street and most of the modern development, and lies upon the hill to the south of Lower Fishguard, to which it is joined by a steep and winding road. The west part of the town that faces Goodwick grew in the first decade of the 20th century with the development of Fishguard Harbour.

== Etymology ==
The English name Fishguard derives from Old Norse Fiskigarðr meaning 'fish catching enclosure', cognate with Modern English fish + yard. In Welsh, Abergwaun means 'mouth of the River Gwaun', the name of the river referring to the high, wet, level ground of a marsh or moor.

== History ==
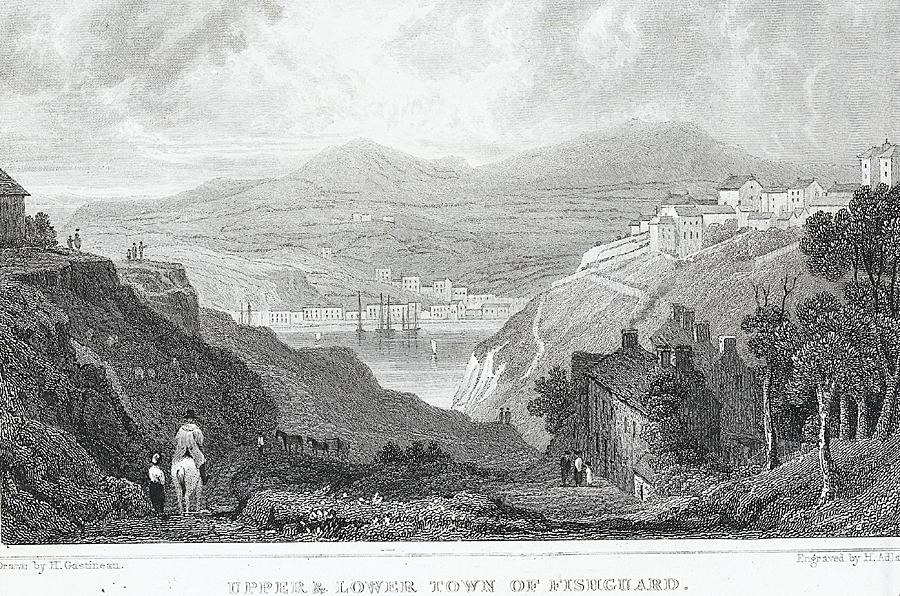
Upper and lower Fishguard, c. 1830

Fishguard is within the historic Welsh cantref of Cemais, and part of the Welsh province of Dyfed, within the historic Principality of Deheubarth. The coasts of Wales were subject to Norse raids during the Viking Age, and in the latter part of the 10th century Norse trading posts and settlements emerged within Dyfed, with Fishguard established sometime between 950 and 1000 AD.

In 1078 Goodwick Moor was the scene of a bloody battle in which Rhys, son of Owain ap Edwyn, was defeated and slain by Trahaearn ap Caradog (Brut y Tywysogion) in the Battle of Pwllgwdig.

The English place name indicates that there may have been a Scandinavian trading post, although no evidence has been found. However, the V-shaped stone structures of ancient fish traps can still be seen at low tide on both sides of the bay, and it is believed these were the foundations for wooden fences that would trap the fish as the tide went out. Other examples can be found around the country, and they probably date from Saxon times, though similar devices have been in use since Neolithic times.

Called Fiscard until the turn of the 19th century when the name was Anglicised, Fishguard was a marcher borough and in 1603 was described as one of five Pembrokeshire boroughs overseen by a portreeve. The Norman settlement lay along what is now High Street between the church at its north end and the remains of a Norman motte at its south end.

In 1912, Denys Corbett Wilson made the first flight between Britain and Ireland. Starting his journey from Hendon aerodrome on 17 April 1912, he eventually landed in Goodwick on 21 April having made a few unscheduled stops along the way. He then set off from a field near Harbour Village at 5:47 on 22 April and crash-landed 100 minutes later in Crane near Enniscorthy in County Wexford.

Lower Fishguard developed as a herring fishery and port, trading with Ireland, Bristol and Liverpool. In the late 18th century it had 50 coasting vessels, and exported oats and salt herring. In 1779, the port was raided by the privateer Black Prince, which bombarded the town when the payment of a £1,000 ransom was refused. As a result, Fishguard Fort was completed in 1781, overlooking Lower Fishguard. The port declined in the latter half of the 19th century.

Fishguard's ancient Royal Oak public house was the site of the signing of surrender after the Battle of Fishguard. This brief campaign, on 22–24 February 1797, is the most recent landing on British soil by a hostile foreign force, and thus is often referred to as the "last invasion of mainland Britain". A force of 1,400 French soldiers landed near Fishguard but surrendered two days later.

A 19th-century vicar of Fishguard, the Rev. Samuel Fenton MA, wrote the book The History of Pembrokeshire.

The ancient Parliamentary Borough of Fishguard was contributory to the Borough of Haverfordwest. During the Second World War, the Fishguard Bay Hotel was Station IXc of Special Operations Executive where submersibles were tested in Fishguard Bay.

Fishguard & Goodwick Golf Club was founded in 1921 and closed in the 1960s.

== Governance ==
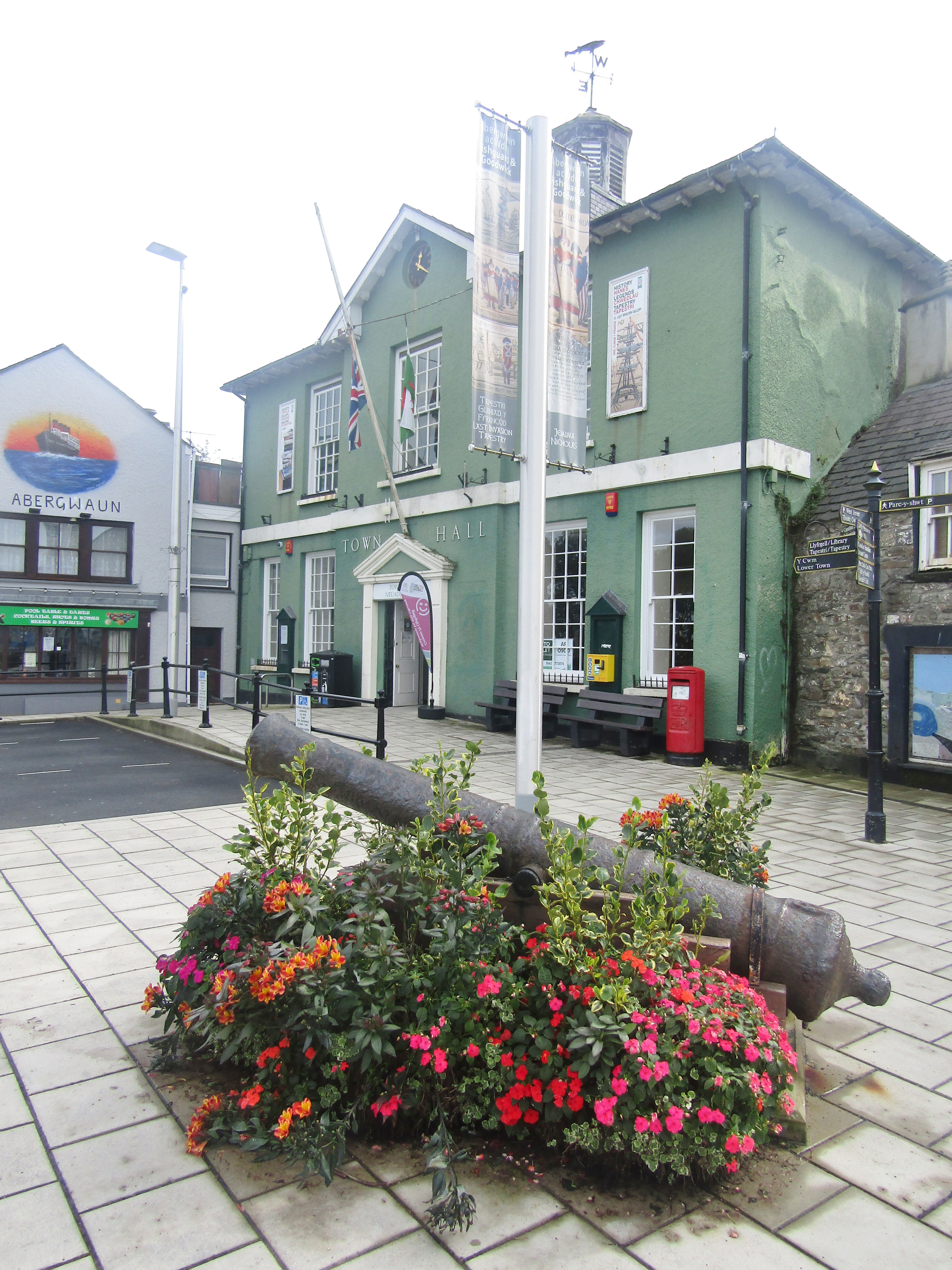
Fishguard Town Hall

There are two tiers of local government covering Fishguard, at community (town) and county level: Fishguard and Goodwick Town Council and Pembrokeshire County Council. The town council is based at Fishguard Town Hall in Market Square.

Fishguard was an ancient parish. When parish and district councils were established in 1894, the parish of Fishguard was included in the Haverfordwest Rural District. In 1906 it was decided to create an urban district covering Fishguard, making it independent from the Haverfordwest Rural District Council. The whole parish of Fishguard was considered too large to be an urban district and so it was split into two parishes: Fishguard North covering the main built up area, to be governed by Fishguard Urban District Council, and Fishguard South which stayed in the Haverfordwest Rural District. These changes took effect on 1 April 1907. The first meeting of Fishguard Urban District Council was held on 8 April 1907 at the Town Hall, when John Robertson Richards, a Conservative, was appointed the first chairman of the council.

The urban district was enlarged in 1934 to include neighbouring Goodwick, becoming Fishguard and Goodwick Urban District. Fishguard and Goodwick Urban District was abolished under the Local Government Act 1972, with the area becoming part of the district of Preseli Pembrokeshire on 1 April 1974. A community covering the former urban district was established at the same time, with its council taking the name Fishguard and Goodwick Town Council. Preseli Pembrokeshire was abolished in 1996 to become part of a re-established Pembrokeshire.

== Geography ==
The town is situated at the back of a north facing bay known as Fishguard Bay (Welsh: Bae Abergwaun) which offers protection from waves generated by prevailing westerly winds. It has a relatively mild climate due to its coastal position. The winds coming from the west or south-west have a determining influence on temperature and precipitation. There is an islet in Fishguard Bay, Needle Rock which reaches 131 feet (40 metres).

Wildlife around Fishguard is rich with a wide variety of colourful wild flowers and sea mammals including the grey seal, porpoises and dolphins. The local birdlife include Eurasian curlew, common redshank and sanderling regularly foraging in the lower Fishguard Harbour and European stonechat, great cormorant and northern fulmar can be seen from the coastal path.

== Demography ==
According to the 2021 census, Fishguard had a population of roughly 3,400, 29.6% of the population being able to speak Welsh. This compares with 39.8% in 2001, 58.9% in 1951 and 90.3% in 1901.

The population breaks down as follows:

Age Distribution	Fishguard	Pembrokeshire
0–4 years	4.3%	4.5%
5–14 years	10.2%	11.3%
15–19 years	4.6%	5.1%
20–44 years	22.4%	25.2%
45–64 years	26.6%	27.7%
65+ years	31.7%	26.3%

The largest ethnic group in Fishguard is White, making up 97.7% of the population, the county average. The second largest ethnic group is Asian/Asian British who make up 0.9% of the population, also the county average. The largest religious group is Christian with 47.3% of the population, lower than the county average of 48.8%. The second largest religious group is No religion with 43.2% of the population, roughly the county average.

== Landmarks ==
Outside Fishguard there is a stone monument commemorating the signing of the Peace Treaty after the last invasion of Britain in 1797. Women dressed in Welsh costume are said to have startled the invaders. The 19th-century parish church of St Mary's contains a memorial stone to the heroine Jemima Nicholas, who helped repel the French invasion. There is also a Bi-Centenary memorial stone monument in West Street, Fishguard to commemorate the invasion. A tapestry was created in 1997 to commemorate the invasion and is on display to the public in Fishguard Town Hall.

There are more than 80 listed buildings in and around the town.

== Community and culture ==
Fishguard has hotels and is the main shopping town of North Pembrokeshire with a market in the town hall on Tuesdays, Thursdays and Saturdays.

Fishguard has a Round Table doing community work including running the Fishguard & Goodwick Carnival and the Fishguard Autumn Festival.

The Gwaun Lodge of the Royal Antediluvian Order of Buffaloes, is a charitable organisation within the community who host sponsored events and other community works throughout the year.

Fishguard has a 180-seat cinema/theatre called Theatr Gwaun which provides a venue for film, music and live theatre and hosted the National Eisteddfod in 1936 and 1986.

== Transport ==
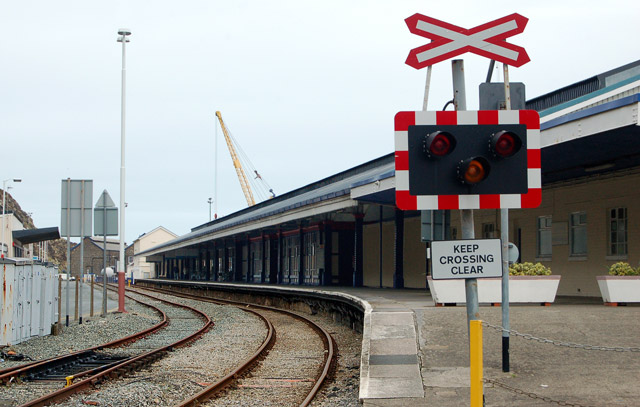
Fishguard Harbour railway station

Fishguard is the terminus of the London to Fishguard Trunk Road (A40). A regular ferry operated by Stena Line leaves for Rosslare in Ireland from the port of Fishguard Harbour, Goodwick. Following the Brexit withdrawal agreement, freight traffic from Rosslare fell by 50% in January 2021.

Rail services are operated by Transport for Wales Rail from Fishguard Harbour and Fishguard and Goodwick railway stations on the West Wales line to Swansea and Cardiff. Through trains to London were withdrawn in 2004.

Starting in 1909 the fast Cunard liners from New York began anchoring at Fishguard to allow passengers to take a Great Western train to London, saving a few hours compared to Liverpool.

== In the media ==
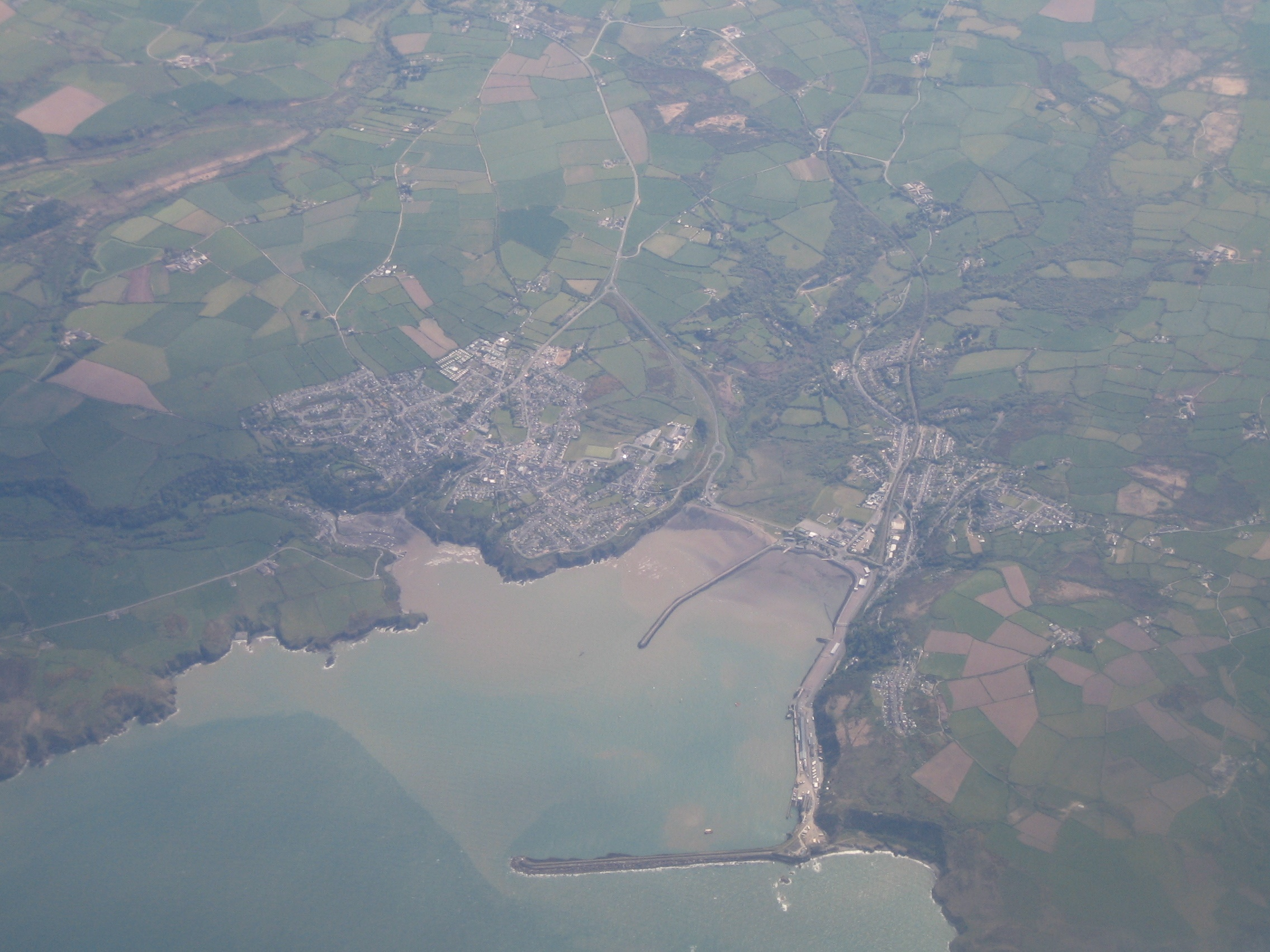
An aerial view of Fishguard

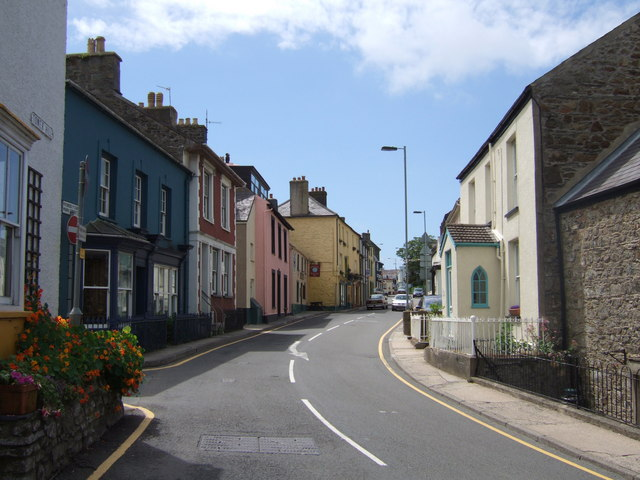
Main Street, Fishguard in 2006

Lower Fishguard was used as "Llareggub" in the film of Dylan Thomas's Under Milk Wood, starring Richard Burton, Elizabeth Taylor and Peter O'Toole. Many local people were involved in the production of this film as background characters. The film Moby Dick (starring Gregory Peck) was filmed there in 1955.

== Business ==
Fishguard and Goodwick Chamber of Trade and Tourism is a business support group.

== Notable people ==
See Category:People from Fishguard

- Richard Fenton (1747–1821), a Welsh lawyer, topographer and poet; retired and died in Fishguard.
- Jemima Nicholas (ca.1750–1832), armed only with a pitchfork, single-handedly captured 12 French soldiers in the Battle of Fishguard in 1797.
- John Bowen (1815–1859), an Anglican bishop in Sierra Leone; born at nearby Court.
- Willie Thomas (1866–1921), rugby player.
- Arthur Wade-Evans (1875–1964), clergyman and historian.
- Thomas James Stretch (1915–1973), clergyman and WW2 army chaplain.
- Glenys Cour (born 1924), a Welsh artist known for painting, stained glass and collage.
- Sue Jones-Davies (born 1949), actress and singer, attended Fishguard County Secondary School during the 1960s.
- Jonathan Lean (born 1952), retired as Dean of St Davids Cathedral in 2017.
- Paula Craig (born 1963), a former detective, cyclist, former runner, paratriathlete.
- Cerys Matthews (born 1969), lead singer of Catatonia went to Ysgol Bro Gwaun.
- Mark Delaney (born 1976), football coach and former Premier League & international footballer.

== Twinning ==
Fishguard is twinned with Loctudy in Brittany, France.

== See also ==
- Fishguard Folk Festival
- Fishguard Lifeboat Station
