= Goodwick =

Town on Fishguard Harbour, Wales

Coordinates: 52.003°N 4.992°W

Goodwick: Welsh: Wdig
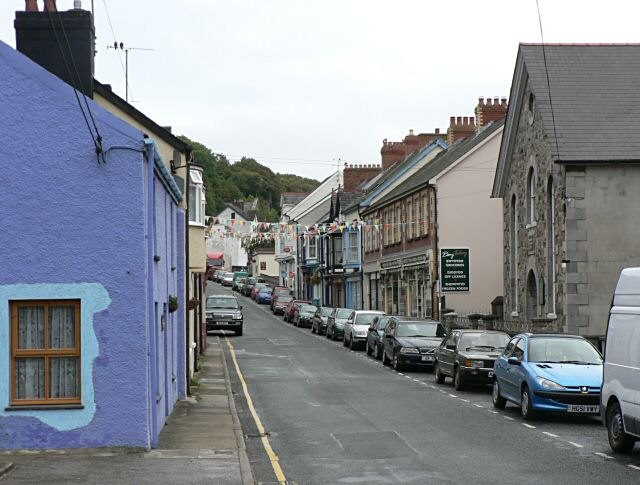
- Main Street, Goodwick

- Location within Pembrokeshire
- Population: 1,988
- OS grid reference: SM945381
- Community: Fishguard and Goodwick
- Principal area: Pembrokeshire
- Preserved county: Dyfed
- Country: Wales
- Sovereign state: United Kingdom
- Post town: GOODWICK
- Postcode district: SA64
- Dialling code: 01348
- Police: Dyfed-Powys
- Fire: Mid and West Wales
- Ambulance: Welsh
- UK Parliament: Ceredigion Preseli
- Senedd Cymru – Welsh Parliament: Ceredigion Penfro

Goodwick (/ˈɡʊdɪk/; Welsh: Wdig) is a coastal town in Pembrokeshire, Wales, immediately west of its twin town of Fishguard.

Fishguard and Goodwick form a community that wraps around Fishguard Bay. As well as the two towns, it consists of Dyffryn, Stop-and-Call, Harbour Village, Lower Town, and Penyraber. A Goodwick electoral ward exists covering the town with a total population of 1,988 at the 2011 census.

== History ==
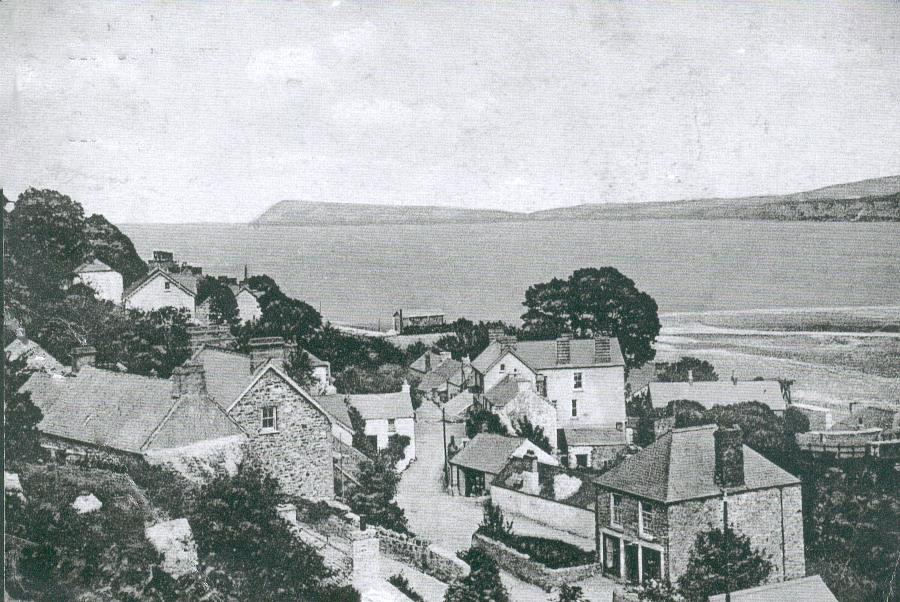
Goodwick Square (c. 1850)

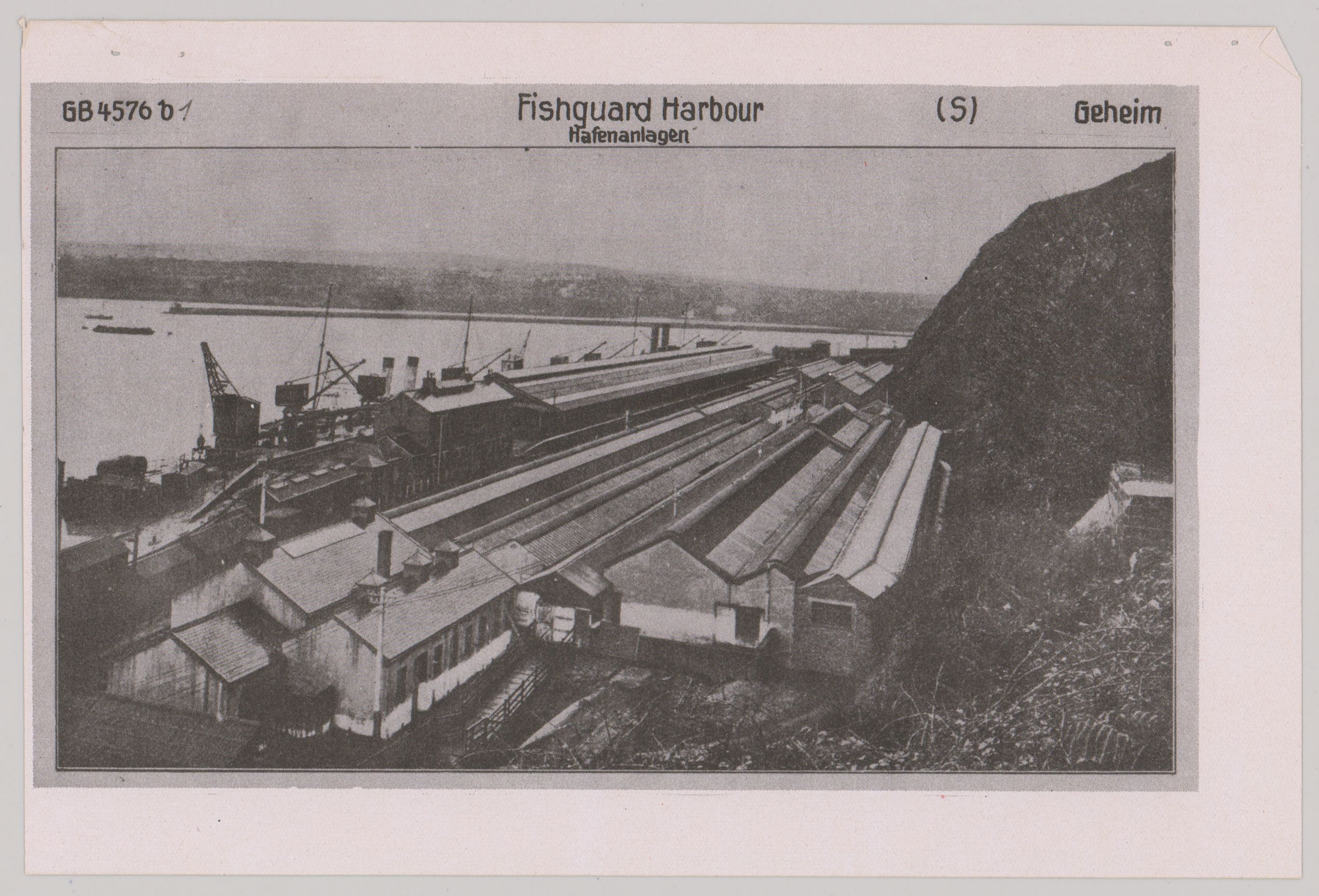
Fishguard Harbour, 1930s

During the Viking Age, the coasts of Wales were subjected to raids in the latter 10th century. Norse trading posts and settlements were established. The name probably derives from a combination of the old Norse forms: góðr (good) and vik (bay or cove) giving góðrvik. Compare formation with Reykjavík (Smoking Bay) where reykr = 'smoke' and Wick, Caithness and Lerwick.

In 1078 Goodwick Moor was the scene of a bloody battle in which Rhys, son of Owain ap Edwyn, was defeated and slain by Trahaearn ap Caradog (Brut y Tywysogion) in the Battle of Goodwick (also known as the Battle of Pwllgwdig).

Goodwick Sands, the local beach, is where the defeated French invasion force assembled prior to their unconditional surrender on 24 February 1797 after the Battle of Fishguard.

Goodwick was a small fishing village in the parish of Llanwnda, but in 1887 work commenced on a railway connection and harbour, and the village grew rapidly to service this. The main industry is now tourism, although in the town's industrial past brickmaking was once an important industry. Some fishing still takes place on a small scale, but most local fishing activity is centered on Fishguard's Lower Town.

Map of Goodwick and Fishguard Bay

== Fishguard Harbour ==
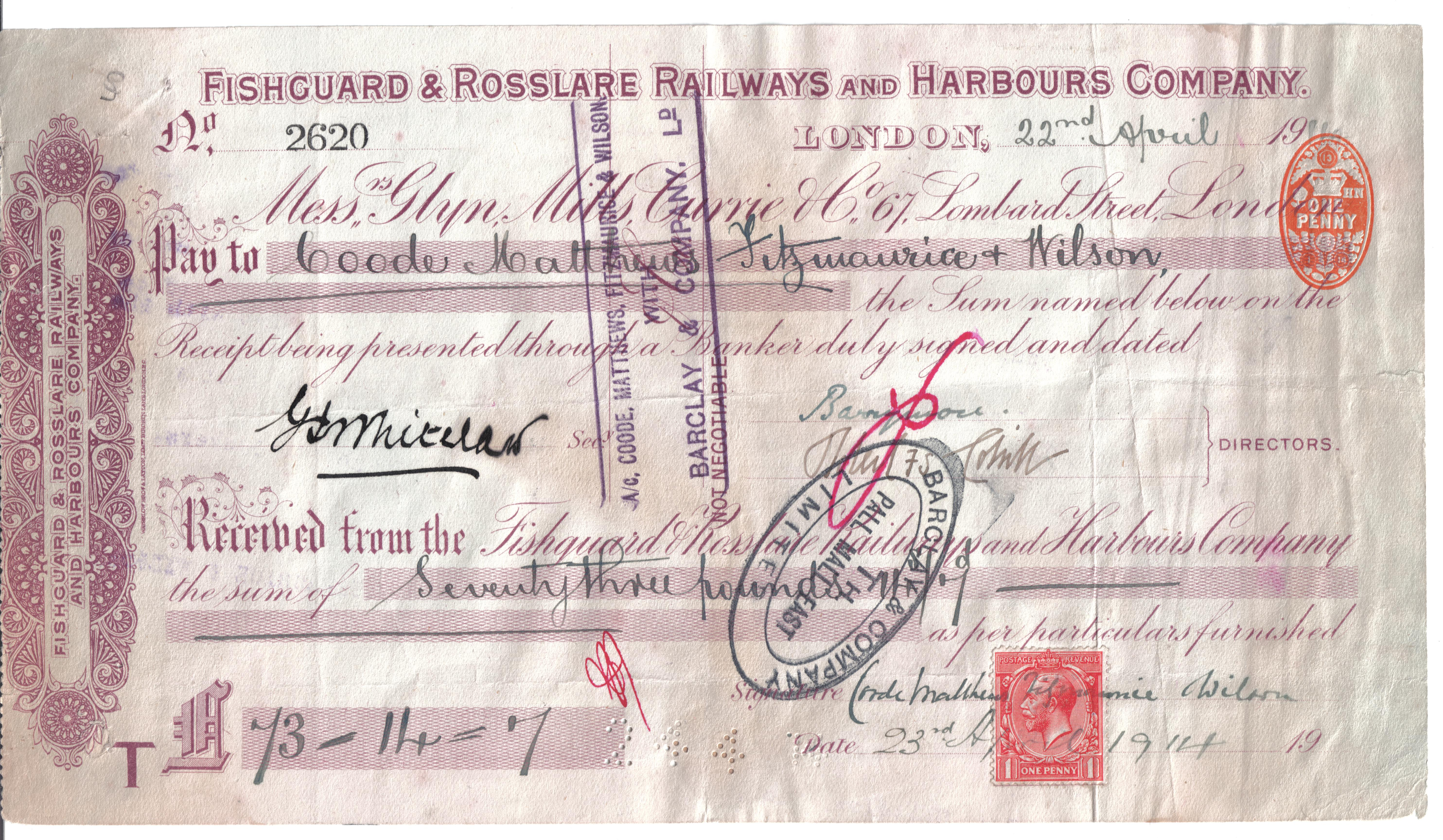
Certificate of the Fishguard and Rosslare Railways and Harbours Company

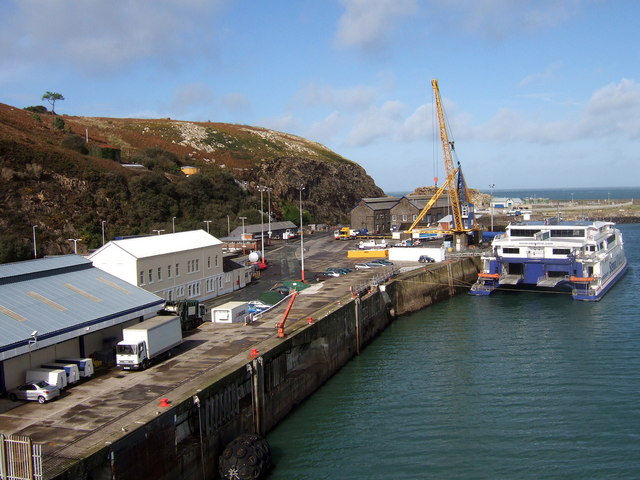
Ferry port at Goodwick

The harbour was constructed by blasting 1.6 million tonnes of rock from the hillside to make a 1,000 yards (910 m) long breakwater. The quarried-out area became the quay. The harbour was finally opened on 30 August 1906. Planned to be the end of the Great Western Railway's line and its major sea port, replacing Neyland, problems with the harbour (known as Fishguard Harbour) prevented larger ocean liners from docking. Accordingly, the harbour has a smaller inner breakwater protecting the remaining open side.

The Great Western Railway ordered three new steamers for its service to Rosslare, St David, St George and St Patrick.

In 1909, when the RMS Mauretania visited, the passengers had to disembark and board by tender when transferring to and from the London train. The smaller breakwater was built as part of the preparations for the visit of the RMS Mauretania and is sometimes known as the "Mauretania Mole". The breakwater led to unanticipated silting, and the prospect of future visits from larger liners was abandoned. Directly above the harbour is a small estate known as "Harbour Village", built to house workers during the construction of the harbour.

The port now accommodates a ferry service to Rosslare operated by Stena Line.

The RNLI, from Fishguard Lifeboat Station operates an all weather Trent class lifeboat, the Blue Peter VII, and a class D inshore lifeboat from within the harbour.

In October 2011, plans for Fishguard & Goodwick Marina were revealed in the Western Telegraph. The developers Conygar who hope to invest £100 million into the project have submitted plans to Pembrokeshire County Council for a 450 berth marina, 253 new residential flats and a 19-acre platform for the potential expansion of the existing Stena Line port. The scheme would also create a publicly accessible promenade and waterfront, and visitor parking as well as workshops, stores and ancillary facilities. If approved most of the proposed new developments will be sited by reclaiming land from the sea bed within the two existing breakwaters mainly near the current 'Ocean Lab' and alongside the existing ferry terminal access roads. Conygar have also exchanged contracts to acquire an eleven-acre site for a lorry stop and distribution park on the perimeter of the Stena Line owned port. In January 2018, however, Stena announced it had withdrawn from the project, meaning Conygar could not continue with their plans.

== Stop-and-Call ==
Originally a separate settlement, Stop-and-Call has now become contiguous with Goodwick. It is at the point where Goodwick Hill levels out after climbing 330 feet (100 m) about 3/4 mile (1.2 km) from the centre of Goodwick. The 1841 Census for the Parish of Llanwnda indicates the presence of three inhabited houses in 'Stop and Call'. However, it does not appear on a map which dates from ca. 1850. The will of Margaret Llewelin Lewis of Goodwick, dated 1878, leaves property at 'Stopancall'. The Ordnance Survey six inch map of Pembrokeshire published 1888 (surveyed 1887) shows the settlement of 'Stop & Call' comprising only three substantial buildings. A map dating from 1891 shows the area as being moorland, with very few buildings; Kelly's Directory for 1895 does not mention the Stop-and-Call

== Governance ==
There are two tiers of local government covering Goodwick, at community (town) and county level: Fishguard and Goodwick Town Council and Pembrokeshire County Council. The town council is based at Fishguard Town Hall in Market Square, Fishguard.

Goodwick historically formed part of the parish of Llanwnda. When parish and district councils were established in 1894, the parish of Llanwnda was included in the Haverfordwest Rural District, as was neighbouring Fishguard. Fishguard was made an urban district in 1907, but Goodwick stayed in Haverfordwest Rural District at that point, despite much of the developing Fishguard Harbour actually falling within Goodwick rather than within the territory of the new Fishguard Urban District. On 1 April 1923 a parish of Goodwick was created from part of Llanwnda, and the new parish was declared to be an urban district, making it independent from the Haverfordwest Rural District Council. Goodwick Urban District was relatively short-lived, being abolished eleven years later when it merged with Fishguard Urban District on 1 April 1934, becoming Fishguard and Goodwick Urban District.

Fishguard and Goodwick Urban District was abolished under the Local Government Act 1972, with the area becoming part of the district of Preseli Pembrokeshire on 1 April 1974. A community covering the former urban district was established at the same time, with its council taking the name Fishguard and Goodwick Town Council. Preseli Pembrokeshire was abolished in 1996 to become part of a re-established Pembrokeshire.

== Transport ==
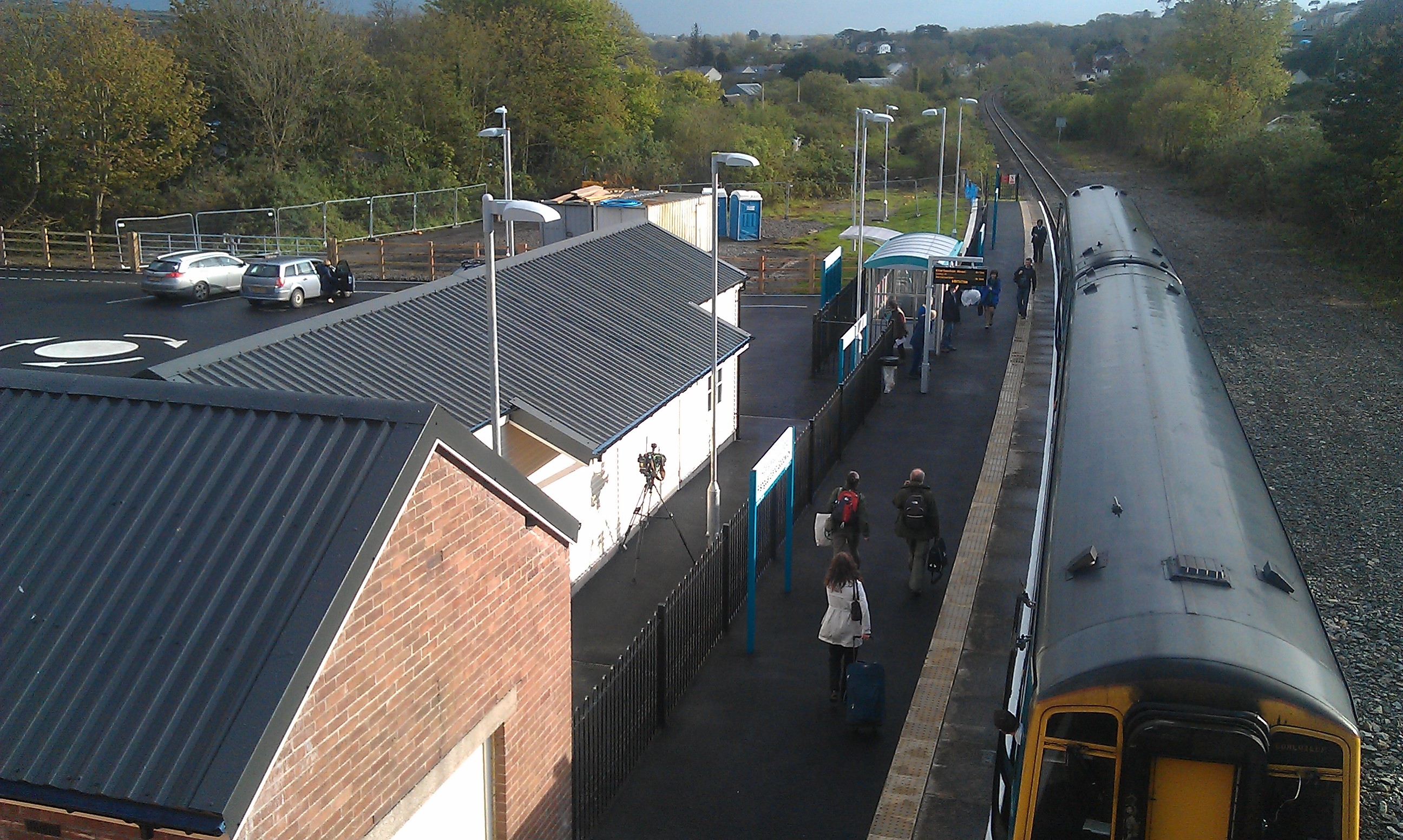
Newly-opened station; passengers alight the train for the first time in 48 years (14 May 2012)

Fishguard & Goodwick railway station served local rail travellers from the town, and from nearby Fishguard, until the line was effectively closed to such passengers by the reduction in service to boat trains only in 1964. After this, trains only served Fishguard Harbour and the station fell into disrepair. Following investment from Network Rail and Pembrokeshire County Council the station has now been re-built and was reopened for passengers again, on 14 May 2012. It is served by the boat trains and the newly introduced local trains.

The harbour is used by Stena Line ferries to Rosslare Europort in Ireland. In 2024, the MS Stena Nordica RoPax ferry has two sailings each way per day, one around lunch time and one in the early hours of the morning. The high-speed catamaran ferry Stena Lynx III (renamed Elite Jet in 2023) operated in the summer only until the end of the 2011 season. Her schedule, for instance in the 2010 season consisted of a morning departure to Rosslare and a late afternoon arrival into Fishguard Harbour.

The town is served by the Fishguard town service bus, which runs alternately from Harbour Village or Stop-and-Call to Fishguard bus station at Ffordd yr Efail. Two Fishguard - St Davids bus routes also pass through the town.

=== Early aviation ===
The first successful flight from Britain to Ireland was made from Goodwick's Harbour Village on 22 April 1912 by Denys Corbett Wilson, flying a Bleriot XI. The flight lasted one hour 40 minutes, with landfall near Enniscorthy, Ireland. The achievement was commemorated in Centenary Celebrations held in Fishguard and Goodwick on the weekend of 21/22 April 2012 and in a specially commissioned stage play by Derek Webb, called '100 Minutes' which was performed in Fishguard and Wexford the same week.

== Notable people ==
- Thomas James Stretch (1915-1973), clergyman and WW2 army chaplain
- Mark Delaney (born 1976), football coach and former Premier League & international footballer

== Bibliography ==
- Cowsill, Miles (1990). Fishguard Rosslare. Kilgetty, Pembrokeshire: Ferry Publications. ISBN 1871947065.
- Cowsill, Miles (1993). Ferries from Pembrokeshire (Rev. and 2nd ed.). Kilgetty, Pembrokeshire: Ferry Publications. ISBN 1871947146.
- Coswill, Miles (2006). Fishguard-Rosslare: The Official 1906-2006 Anniversary Book. Ramsey, Isle of Man: Ferry Publications. ISBN 1871947820.
- Merrigan, Justin (2010). Fishguard-Rosslare: The Album. Ramsey, Isle of Man: Ferry Publications. ISBN 9781906608248.
- Shepherd, Ernie (2015). Fishguard & Rosslare Railways & Harbours Company. Newtownards: Colourpoint Books. ISBN 9781780730677.
