= New Inn Bridge Halt railway station =

Short-lived railway station in Amroth, Pembrokeshire

New Inn Bridge Halt

General information
- Location: Amroth, Pembrokeshire; Wales
- Coordinates: 51.9338°N 4.8218°W
- Grid reference: SN061299
- Platforms: 1

Other information
- Status: Disused

History
- Original company: Great Western Railway
- Post-grouping: Great Western Railway

Key dates
- 14 October 1929: Opened
- 25 October 1937: Closed
Location

New Inn Bridge Halt railway station served the village of Amroth, Pembrokeshire, Wales from 1929 to 1937 on the North Pembrokeshire and Fishguard Railway.

== History ==
The station opened on 14 October 1929 by the North Pembrokeshire and Fishguard Railway. It was situated on the east side of a road on the B4328. It opened along with four other halts: Castlebythe Halt, Beulah Halt, Jordanston Halt and Martell Bridge Halt. It was the busiest of the others, even though it was in a remote area that only served farms and the nearby New Inn. It closed along with the line on 25 October 1937.

Preceding station	Disused railways	Following station
Rosebush; Line and station closed	North Pembrokeshire and Fishguard Railway	Puncheston; Line and station closed
