= Rosebush railway station =

Disused railway station in Rosebush, Pembrokeshire

Rosebush
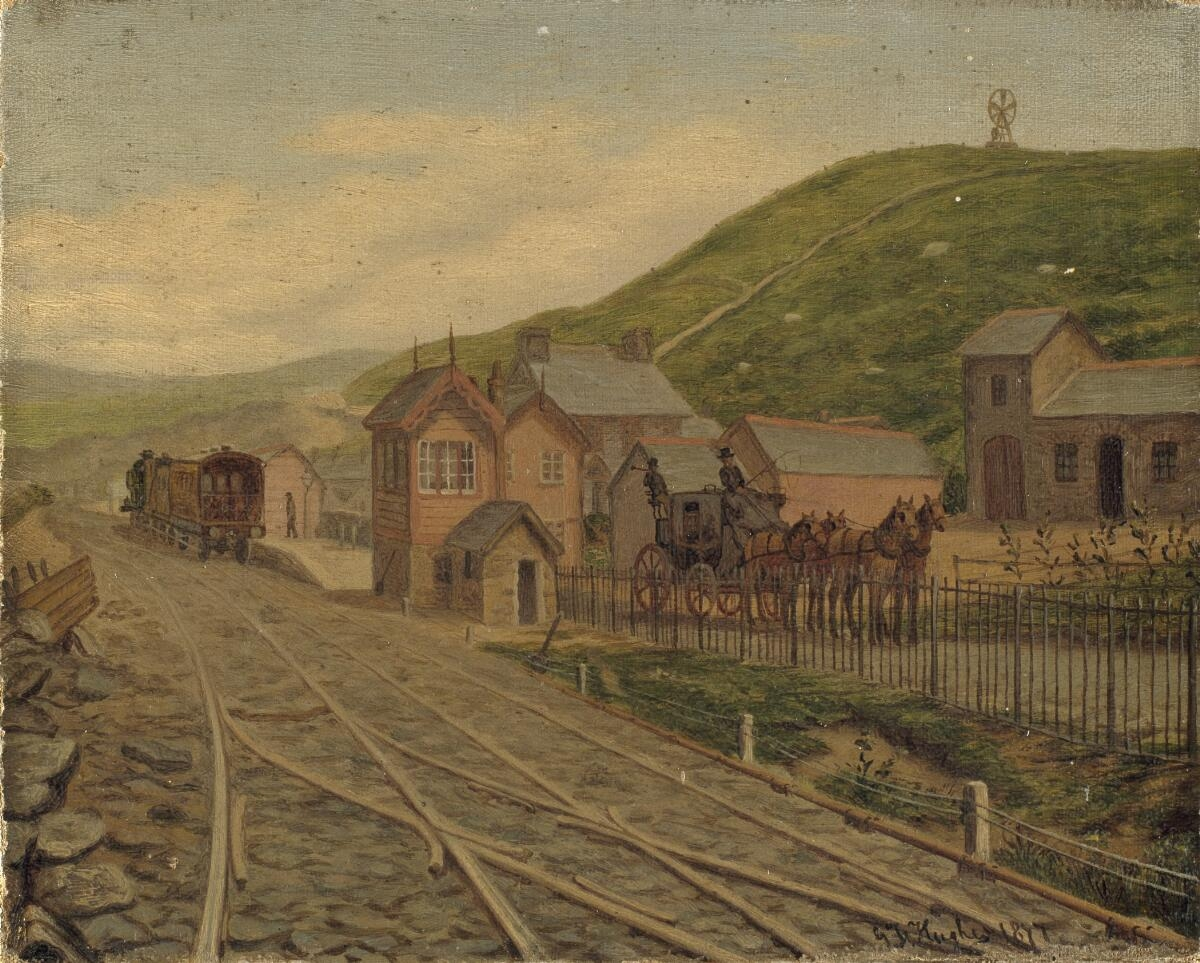
- A painting of the station from 1877

General information
- Location: Rosebush, Pembrokeshire; Wales
- Coordinates: 51.9307°N 4.8015°W
- Grid reference: SN074295
- Platforms: 1

Other information
- Status: Disused

History
- Original company: Narberth Road and Maenclochog Railway
- Pre-grouping: Great Western Railway
- Post-grouping: Great Western Railway

Key dates
- 19 September 1876: Opened
- 1 January 1883: Closed
- December 1884: Reopened
- 31 March 1885: Closed again
- 21 March 1887: Reopened again
- 25 May 1887: Closed again
- 11 April 1895: Reopened again
- 8 January 1917: Closed again
- 12 July 1920: Reopened for the last time
- 25 October 1937: Closed permanently to passengers
- 16 May 1949: Closed to goods
Location

Rosebush railway station served the village of Rosebush, Pembrokeshire, Wales, from 1876 to 1949 on the Narberth Road and Maenclochog Railway.

== History ==
The station opened on 19 September 1876 on the Narberth Road and Maenclochog Railway. It was situated behind houses on the west side of an unnamed road. To the south were two sidings with an engine shed in the middle. Another engine shed was to the north near Rosebush Quarry. The original shed closed in 1899 and the second shed closed in 1912. Like Llanycefn and Maenclochog, this station closed and reopened a lot, first closing on 1 January 1883, reopening in December 1884, closing again on 31 March 1885, reopening again on 21 March 1887, closing yet again on 25 May 1887, reopening yet again on 11 April 1895 when the line was extended closing on 8 January 1917 and reopening one last time on 12 July 1920. It closed permanently to passengers on 25 October 1937 and closed to goods on 16 May 1949.

The station's adjacent pub, the Tafarn Sinc (Zinc Tavern), remains in business.

Preceding station	Disused railways	Following station
Maenclochog; Line and station closed	Narberth Road and Maenclochog Railway	Terminus
Terminus	North Pembrokeshire and Fishguard Railway	New Inn Bridge Halt; Line and station closed
