= Beag Fair Siding railway station =

Disused railway station in Clynderwen, Pembrokeshire

Beag Fair Siding

General information
- Location: Clynderwen, Pembrokeshire; Wales
- Coordinates: 51.8508°N 4.7585°W
- Grid reference: SN101205
- Platforms: 0

Other information
- Status: Disused

History
- Original company: Narberth Road and Maenclochog Railway
- Pre-grouping: Narberth Road and Maenclochog Railway

Key dates
- April 1878: Opened
- 1 January 1883: Closed
- 1 April 1895: Reopened to goods
- 16 May 1949: Closed to goods
Location

Beag Fair Siding railway station served the village of Clynderwen, Pembrokeshire, Wales, from 1878 to 1949 on the Narberth Road and Maenclochog Railway.

== History ==
The station opened in April 1878 by the Narberth Road and Maenclochog Railway. It was situated on the north side of an unnamed road on the C3032. It had no platforms so people had to alight on the road, specifically the road along the siding, which the north, of which points were operated by a six-point ground frame. The station closed on 1 January 1883 but it reopened on 1 April 1895 to goods only. A six-lever signal box was installed around this time to prevent mishaps. This was removed in 1898 by the GWR even though they suggested that it should be built. Not much goods traffic was handled here due to the remote location and it closed on 16 May 1949.

Preceding station	Disused railways	Following station
Clunderwen; Line closed, station open	Narberth Road and Maenclochog Railway	Llanycefn; Line and station closed
