= Maenclochog railway station =

Disused railway station in Maenclochog, Pembrokeshire

Maenclochog

General information
- Location: Maenclochog, Pembrokeshire; Wales
- Coordinates: 51.9089°N 4.7941°W
- Grid reference: SN079270
- Platforms: 1 (initially); 2 (later added)

Other information
- Status: Disused

History
- Original company: Narberth Road and Maenclochog Railway
- Pre-grouping: Great Western Railway
- Post-grouping: Great Western Railway

Key dates
- 19 September 1876: Opened
- 1 January 1883: Closed
- December 1884: Reopened
- 31 March 1885: Closed again
- 21 March 1887: Reopened again
- 25 May 1887: Closed again
- 11 April 1895: Reopened again
- 8 January 1917: Closed again
- 12 July 1920: Reopened for the last time
- 25 October 1937: Closed permanently to passengers
- 16 May 1949: Closed to goods
Location

Maenclochog railway station served the village of Maenclochog, Pembrokeshire, Wales, from 1876 to 1949 on the Narberth Road and Maenclochog Railway.

== History ==
The station opened on 19 September 1876 by the Narberth Road and Maenclochog Railway. It was situated on the south side of an unnamed minor road on the C3002. The goods yard originally had four sidings, the easternmost one serving a cattle dock and its pens. The signal box was adjacent to the level crossing. The station closed and reopened a lot, first closing on 1 January 1883, reopening in December 1884, closing again on 31 March 1885, reopening again on 21 March 1887, closing yet again on 25 May 1887, reopening yet again on 11 April 1895 when the line was extended closing on 8 January 1917 and reopening one last time on 12 July 1920. After it reopened in 1895, it was remodelled dramatically, receiving a second platform, a new station building and the signal box was relocated south of its original position. The goods yard was also relocated and the number of sidings was reduced to three. The signal box was closed and demolished after the line reopened in 1920. The station closed permanently to passengers on 25 October 1937 and closed to goods on 16 May 1949.

| Preceding station | Disused railways | Following station |
|---|---|---|
| Llanycefn; Line and station closed | Narberth Road and Maenclochog Railway | Rosebush; Line and station closed |
