= Under Milk Wood (2015 film) =

2015 film

- Theatrical release poster
- Directed by: Kevin Allen
- Written by: Kevin Allen; Dylan Thomas
- Starring: Rhys Ifans
- Release dates: 20 June 2015 (EIFF); 30 October 2015 (UK)
- Running time: 87 minutes
- Country: United Kingdom
- Languages: Welsh; English

Under Milk Wood (Welsh version: Dan y Wenallt) is a 2015 Welsh drama film based on the radio drama of the same name by Dylan Thomas. It is adapted and directed by Kevin Allen. The narrator is Rhys Ifans. The film was selected as the British entry for the Best Foreign Language Film at the 88th Academy Awards but not nominated.

== Cast ==
- Rhys Ifans as Captain Cat
- Lisa Palfrey as Mrs Dai Bread 1
- Buddug Verona James as Mrs Ogmore-Pritchard
- Charlotte Church as Polly Garter
- Aneirin Hughes as Organ Morgan
- Boyd Clack as Mr Pugh
- Di Botcher as Mrs Dai Bread 2
- Llyr Ifans as No Good Boyo
- Nia Roberts as Myfanwy Price
- Steffan Rhodri as Mog Edwards
- Sara Sugarman as 1st Neighbour
- Julian Lewis Jones as 2nd Drowned

== Production ==
This was the first feature adaptation of the play since the 1972 film, which starred Elizabeth Taylor and Richard Burton. It was largely filmed in the Pembrokeshire village of Solva during the summer of 2014. Two versions of the film were shot, one in English and the other in Welsh (known as Dan y Wenallt). Dan y Wenallt was put forward for Best Foreign Language Film at the 2016 Oscars.

The film premiered simultaneously in Cardiff and Theatr Gwaun in the Pembrokeshire town of Fishguard, before being shown around Wales in December 2014 as part of the centenary celebrations of Thomas's birth. It received its official UK premiere in June 2015 at the Edinburgh International Film Festival.

== Reception ==
On review aggregator Rotten Tomatoes, the film holds an approval rating of 33% based on 18 reviews, with an average rating of 5.1/10.

The Independent in its review of the film says it "shows tremendous visual imagination in places and has plenty of ghoulishness, scabrous humour and eroticism along the way" and "doesn't hold back on depicting the grotesquerie of the Wales that Dylan Thomas evoked". Rhys Ifans' "delivery is calmer and more measured than Burton's mercurial, intensely dramatic rendition" and just about holds together the "dozens of surrealistic tableau-like scenes". It gives the film three out of five stars.

The Daily Mirror also gave the film three out of five stars, though describing it as a "noble failure" where the director "deploys no end of visual tricks to match Thomas’s lyricism – a glaring palette, soft focusing and even a camera seemingly mounted on the back of a mouse – but the tricks distract as much as they divert".

Variety magazine pointed out the humour of the original play had not aged well, the performances of the cast were "obscured by the film’s florid visual style and fruity versification", while the Welsh cast and Welsh language version would have "limited appeal outside Wales" and "minor status as a local curiosity".

Screen Daily described the film as a "sticky mess of sexual urges and intrigue, ...which clouds Thomas’ work rather than clarifies it" with the visual component "frequently distracting and sometimes outright unpleasant".

== See also ==
- Cinema of Wales
- List of Welsh films
- List of submissions to the 88th Academy Awards for Best Foreign Language Film
- List of British submissions for the Academy Award for Best Foreign Language Film
