= Rosebush, Pembrokeshire =

Village in Pembrokeshire, Wales

Coordinates: 51.93°N 4.8°W

Rosebush: Welsh: Rhos-y-bwlch
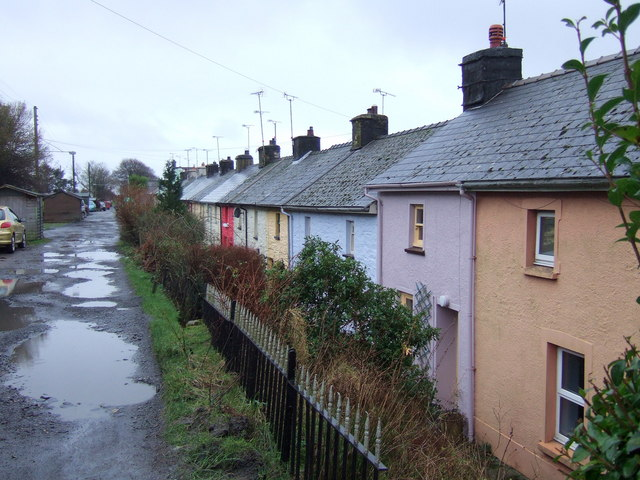
- Terrace of quarrymen's cottages

- Location within Pembrokeshire
- Community: Maenclochog
- Principal area: Pembrokeshire
- Country: Wales
- Sovereign state: United Kingdom
- Post town: Clynderwen
- Postcode district: SA66
- Dialling code: 01437
- Police: Dyfed-Powys
- Fire: Mid and West Wales
- Ambulance: Welsh
- UK Parliament: Preseli Pembrokeshire
- Senedd Cymru – Welsh Parliament: Preseli Pembrokeshire

Rosebush (Welsh: Rhos-y-bwlch) is a small village in the community of Maenclochog, Pembrokeshire, southwest Wales, UK. It lies in the southern slopes of the Preseli Hills, about 1 mile (1.6 km) north west of the village of Maenclochog. Slate was extensively quarried nearby, and was exported by the Narberth Road and Maenclochog Railway, which was later extended towards Fishguard. Today, Rosebush is a centre for exploring the Preseli Hills. Rosebush is the highest village in Pembrokeshire, at 264m above sea level.

== Name ==
The name Rosebush, an unusual name in the area, is assumed to be an Anglicisation of Rhos y Bwlch or Rhosbwlch (gap/pass moor), a geographically descriptive name typical of the area, being the moorland gap beneath the passes (Bwlch-gwynt and Bwlch Pennant) that lie between the peaks of Foel Eryr and Foel Cwmcerwyn.

== History ==
Rosebush did not exist as a village before slate began to be quarried nearby in the early 19th century. Rosebush was not named in Lewis's 1833 A Topographical Dictionary of Wales, but quarrying in the parish of Maenclochog was, and Rosebush is marked on a pre-1850 parish map. The village took its name from Rosebush quarry when houses were built for quarry workers.

Rosebush may have been the first Welsh village to have piped water, facilitated by the building of Rosebush Reservoir in the late 19th century.

=== Slate quarrying ===
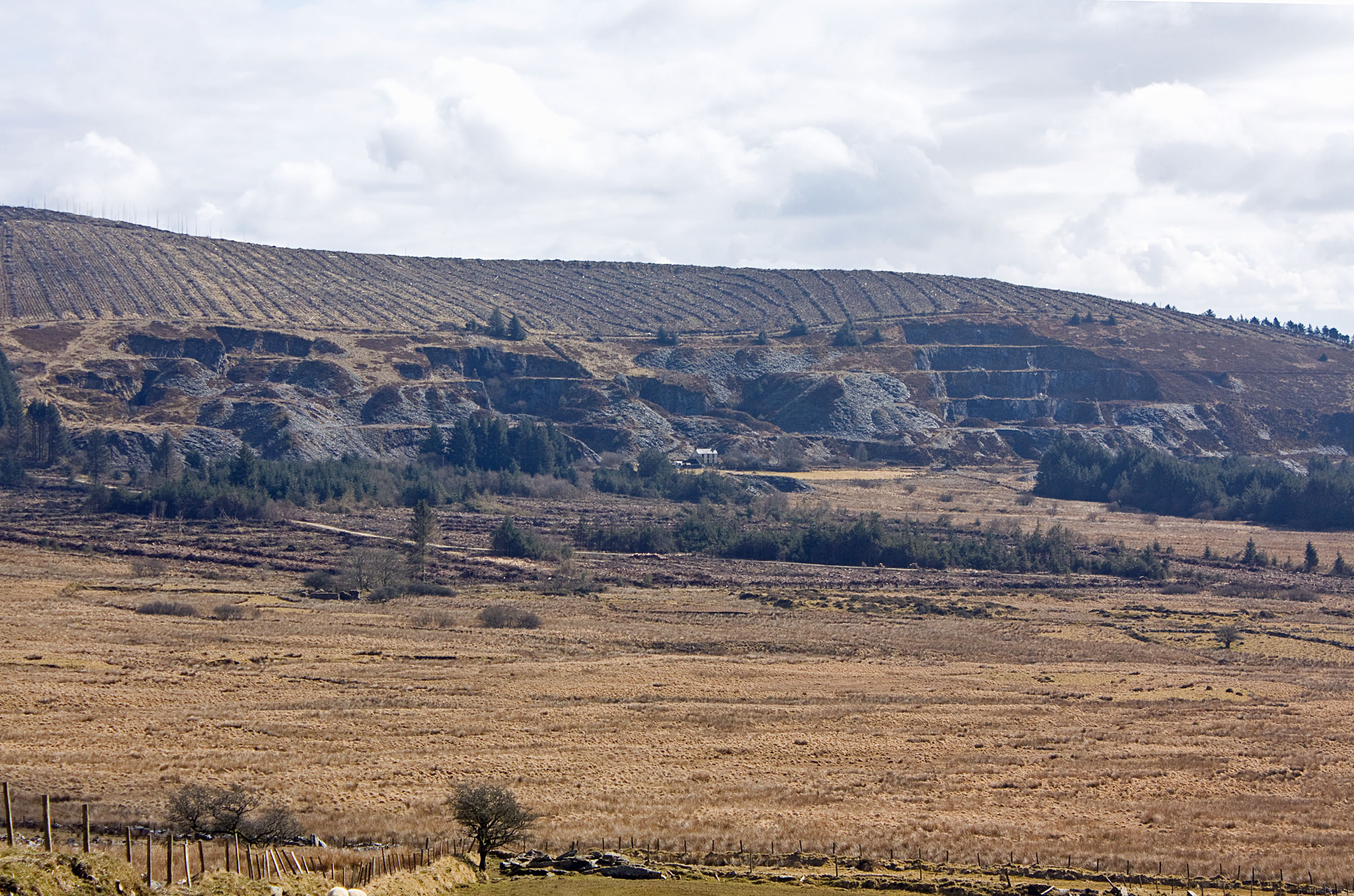
Rosebush Quarry, 2010

Rosebush quarry was a modest but locally significant mining operation in the Welsh slate industry. Quarrying at Rosebush began in 1842 and continued until the end of the century. The quarry supplied slate for the roof of Westminster Palace. Slate was ferried around the county by the old railway; some was taken to Fishguard via the Rosebush and Fishguard Railway to be shipped abroad. To the north, there had been quarrying at Prescelly quarry (later called Bellstone quarry, a literal translation of Maenclochog) since 1825.

Rosebush House, now the Old Post Office Bistro and Bar, was built in 1872 by the owners of Rosebush quarry and is a Grade II-listed building. Inside can be found a slate quarry apprentice piece of work, cut to the shape of a Welsh plank for cooking Welshcakes. This slate comes from Llangolman. The telephone call box outside is also listed.

=== Railway ===
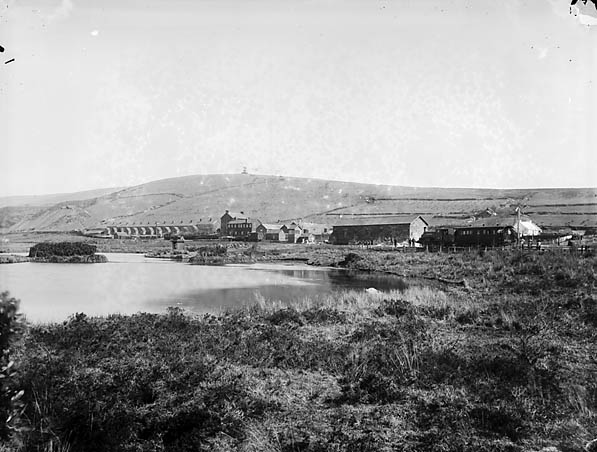
Rosebush, ca 1885, showing railway

In 1876 a railway line from Clynderwen to Rosebush was opened by the Narberth Road and Maenclochog Railway company which facilitated the export of slate from the quarries. The line closed in 1882 and the name changed to North Pembrokeshire and Fishguard Railway in 1884 but was not reopened until 1895 with an extension from Rosebush to Letterston. An early passenger was a Western Mail reporter who travelled from Newport into the mountains to interview the husband of Margaret Rees who was being tried for murdering her child at Tyr-Bwlch. At the end of the report, he wrote that he drove "...to Rosebush Station to return, by the new North Pembrokeshire Railway, to more civilised haunts." At the end of the 19th century attempts were made to encourage tourists to visit by rail, but the proposal did not bear fruit.

The Great Western Railway took over in 1898. The line was closed to passengers in 1937 and to freight in 1949. During World War II the railway line across the moorland was used by British and USA air forces for target practice. The Preselis were used extensively by the military ground forces during the conflict, and some troops were stationed in and around Rosebush.

=== Forgery charge ===
In 1881 at Newport, former Lincolnshire curate John Frederick Morgan, after visiting the rector Rev. Thomas Walters at Rosebush, was committed for trial for stealing a cheque book and passing forged cheques for £50 and £27.10s. He was allowed bail, and subsequently pleaded guilty at trial.

=== Explosion ===
On the evening of June 2013 an explosive device was detonated inside a letter box in the village, destroying the box and scattering cast iron fragments.

== Amenities ==
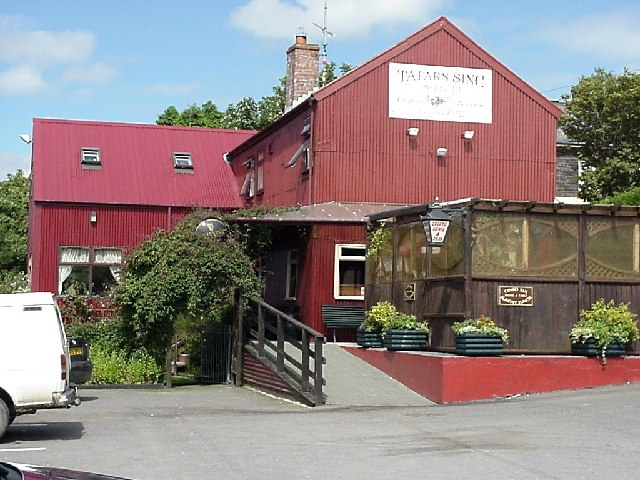
Tafarn Sinc

Rosebush has a pub, Tafarn Sinc, built in 1876 from timber and zinc sheeting in the grounds of the railway station; part of the station platform still exists. The pub was originally a hostelry for quarry workers. It was threatened with closure in the 2010s when the owners retired but the community, with the support of actor Rhys Ifans, raised the money to keep it open.

The Old Post Office, originally the house of the owner of the smaller part of the old Rosebush slate quarry, was built in 1872 of faced Rosebush slate and was a general store where the quarry workers bought supplies. It later became a Victorian post office. From there a walk can be started to the highest point in the hills, and was featured in the BBC series Weatherman walking.

The village is home to Seren Brewing Company and cheese manufacturer Pant Mawr Cheeses, which has a shop and a post office on the farm.

Nearby Rosebush Reservoir provides water for southern Pembrokeshire and is a brown trout fishery. Proposals for the reservoir, to have a capacity of 500,000 gallons, were published in 1882.
