= Clunderwen railway station =

Railway station in Pembrokeshire, Wales

Clunderwen
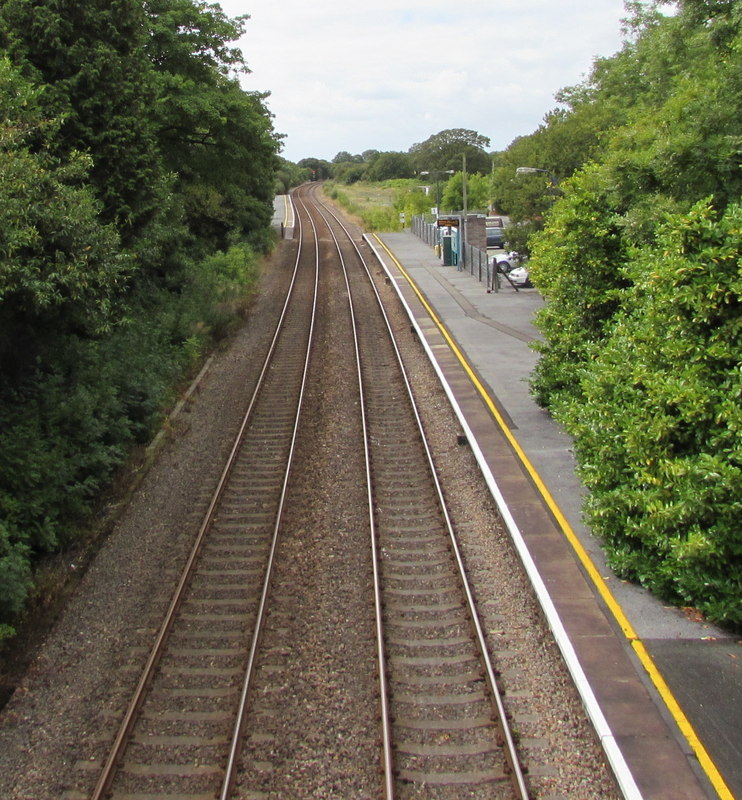
- The station's staggered platforms

General information
- Location: Clynderwen, Pembrokeshire; Wales
- Coordinates: 51.841°N 4.732°W
- Grid reference: SN119192
- Manager: Transport for Wales
- Platforms: 2

Other information
- Station code: CUW
- Classification: DfT category F2

History
- Original company: South Wales Railway
- Pre-grouping: Great Western Railway
- Post-grouping: Great Western Railway

Key dates
- 2 January 1854: Opened as Narberth Road for Cardigan and Tenby
- 1863: Renamed Narberth Road for Cardigan
- 1 December 1875: Renamed Clynderwen
- 6 September 1965: Renamed Clynderwen Halt
- 5 May 1969: Renamed Clynderwen
- 12 May 1980: Renamed Clunderwen

Passengers
- 2021/22: ▲12,382
- 2022/23: ▲16,522
- 2023/24: ▲18,948
- 2024/25: ▲22,754
- 2025/26: ▲26,756
Location
Notes
- Passenger statistics from the Office of Rail and Road

Clunderwen railway station serves the village of Clynderwen (Welsh: Clunderwen) in Pembrokeshire, Wales. The station is unstaffed and is a request stop.

== History ==
The South Wales Railway was extended from Carmarthen Junction to Haverfordwest on 2 January 1854, and among the original stations was one known as Narberth Road for Cardigan and Tenby; this was simplified to Narberth Road for Cardigan in 1863.

The station was renamed Clynderwen on 1 December 1875, being named after the Clynderwen Estate, which included property in the area around the station; a previous suggestion to use the parish name Llandisilio was rejected. The Narberth Road and Maenclochog Railway (NR&MR) opened in 1876, the junction of that line being to the west of Clynderwen station; and the NR&MR trains to Rosebush used a bay at the eastern end of the up side of the station. Initially trains had to reverse in and out of the platform, but with the extension of the Rosebush line to Letterston by the North Pembrokeshire and Fishguard Railway (NP&FR) in 1895 (the NP&FR having taken over the NR&MR), the layout at Clynderwen was improved.

There have been several subsequent amendments to the station's name: to Clynderwen Halt on 6 September 1965; reverting to Clynderwen on 5 May 1969; and finally becoming Clunderwen on 12 May 1980.

InterCity 125 services ran through Clunderwen to Milford Haven until the early 1990s, terminating in 1994.

== Services ==
Transport for Wales operates services between Milford Haven westbound and Swansea, Cardiff Central, Crewe and Manchester Piccadilly eastbound. A basic two-hourly frequency runs on Mondays to Saturdays, with fewer trains on Sundays.

Preceding station	National Rail	Following station
Whitland	Transport for Wales; West Wales line	Clarbeston Road
	Disused railways	
Terminus	Great Western Railway; Narberth Road and Maenclochog Railway	Llanycefn; Line and station closed
