= Maenclochog (electoral ward) =

Electoral division in Pembrokeshire, Wales

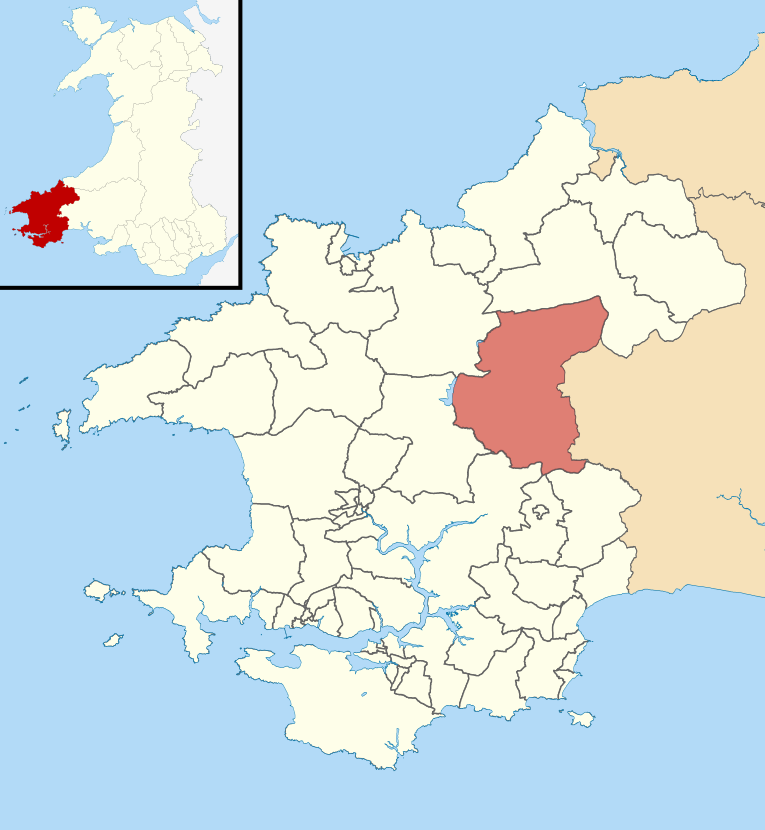
The pre-2022 Maenclochog ward

Maenclochog is an electoral ward in Pembrokeshire, Wales. It covers the Maenclochog community and the two neighbouring communities of Llandissilio West and Clynderwen. The Maenclochog ward elects a councillor to Pembrokeshire County Council.

According to the UK 2011 Census the population of the Maenclochog ward was 3,104 (with 2,443 of these over 18 years of age).

== History ==
Maenclochog was a four community ward from 6 May 1999 with Clynderwen being transferred from Carmarthenshire to Pembrokeshire on 1 April 2003.

Following the recommendations of a boundary review by the Local Government Boundary Commission for Wales, effective from the 2022 local elections, the Maenclochog ward was reconfigured, becoming a three community ward comprising Clunderwen, Llandissilio West and Maenclochog. The community of Mynachlogddu became part of a new 'Crymych and Mynachlog-ddu' ward, while New Moat was transferred to the Wiston ward.

== Maenclochog Community Council ==
Maenclochog is also the name of a community ward (covering part of the Maenclochog community) which elects five of the seven members of Maenclochog Community Council.

== County elections ==
=== 2022 ===
At the Pembrokeshire County Council election in May 2022, the ward elected Independent councillor, Simon Wright, with 505 votes.

=== 2017 ===
At the May 2017 election Maenclochog was the last result to come in, with Independent councillor Huw George retaining his seat on the county council. Cllr George had held the seat since 2008.

2017 Maenclochog
Party	Candidate	Votes	%	±%
Independent	Huw George *	657		
Plaid Cymru	Hefin Wyn	547		

=== 2012 ===
2012 Maenclochog
Party	Candidate	Votes	%	±%
Independent	Huw Meredydd George *	672		
Plaid Cymru	John Rhys Davies	440		

* = sitting councillor prior to the election
