= Tafarn Sinc =

Pub in Rosebush, Wales

Coordinates: 51°55′50″N 4°48′03″W

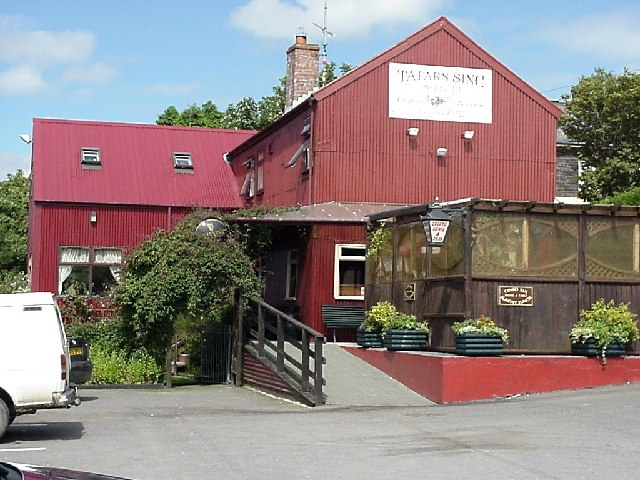
Exterior view

Tafarn Sinc (Zinc Tavern) is a pub in Rosebush, Pembrokeshire, Wales.

The building is constructed of corrugated metal, which was commonly used in the second half of the nineteenth century in Britain for industrial buildings, but is rare for pubs. Opened in 1876 or 1877, it originally served the adjacent Rosebush railway station on the Maenclochog Railway, which opened in 1876. Both were built as part of the development of a local slate quarry by businessman Edward Cropper. The railway station closed to passengers in 1937 but the pub stayed in business.

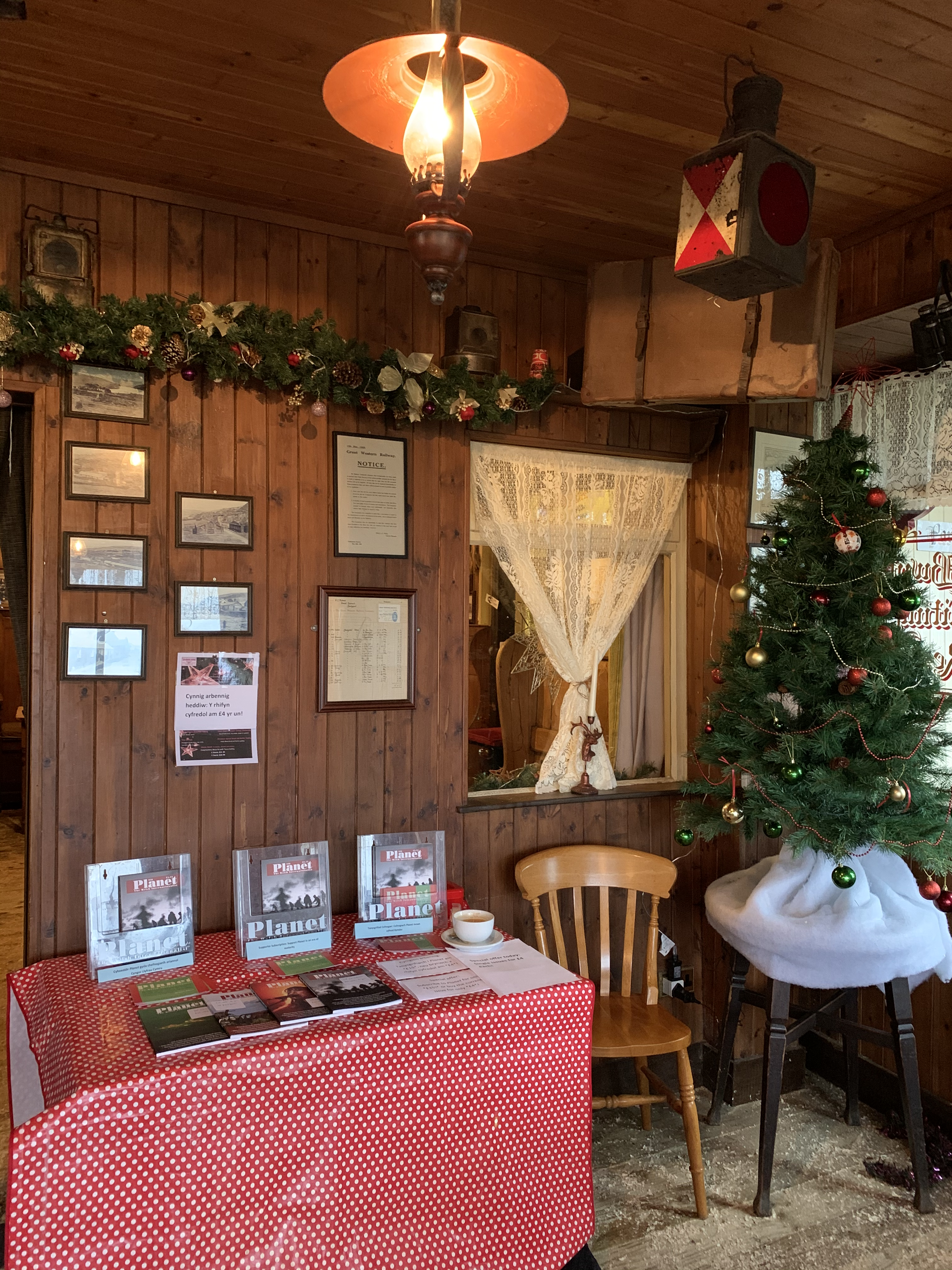
Interior

In 2017, after the owners decided to sell, it was bought by a community group of local residents and other shareholders. The scheme was promoted by actor Rhys Ifans, who was born locally.
