= Beulah Halt railway station =

Short-lived railway station in Little Newcastle, Pembrokeshire

Beulah Halt

General information
- Location: Little Newcastle, Pembrokeshire; Wales
- Coordinates: 51.9174°N 4.9382°W
- Grid reference: SN980284
- Platforms: 1

Other information
- Status: Disused

History
- Original company: Great Western Railway
- Post-grouping: Great Western Railway

Key dates
- 24 September 1928: Opened
- 25 October 1937: Closed
Location

Beulah Halt railway station served the village of Little Newcastle, Pembrokeshire, Wales, from 1928 to 1937 on the North Pembrokeshire and Fishguard Railway.

== History ==
The station opened on 24 September 1928 by the Great Western Railway. It was situated closer to Puncheston village than the original station was. Like Castlebythe Halt, it only had 85-90 passengers a week, thus it closed on 25 October 1937.

Preceding station	Disused railways	Following station
Martell Bridge Halt; Line and station closed	North Pembrokeshire and Fishguard Railway	Letterston; Line and station closed
