= Puncheston railway station =

Disused railway station in Puncheston, Pembrokeshire

Puncheston

General information
- Location: Puncheston, Pembrokeshire; Wales
- Coordinates: 51.9376°N 4.8861°W
- Grid reference: SN017305
- Platforms: 1

Other information
- Status: Disused

History
- Original company: North Pembrokeshire and Fishguard Railway
- Pre-grouping: North Pembrokeshire and Fishguard Railway
- Post-grouping: Great Western Railway

Key dates
- 11 April 1895: Opened
- 8 January 1917: Closed
- 14 November 1921: Reopened
- 25 October 1937: Closed to passengers
- 16 May 1949: Closed
Location

Puncheston railway station served the village of Puncheston, Pembrokeshire, Wales, from 1895 to 1949 on the North Pembrokeshire and Fishguard Railway.

== History ==
The station opened on 11 April 1895 by the North Pembrokeshire and Fishguard Railway. It was situated 100 yards east of a minor road. To the west was the goods yard and at the east end was the signal box. A grounds frame was also nearby, which operated the sidings. When the line was amalgamated in 1898 by the GWR, the signal box closed. The station closed on 8 January 1917 to transfer the rails from the line to France during the First World War. It reopened on 14 November 1921 but it was a temporary terminus until Letterston reopened in 1923. It closed to passengers permanently on 25 October 1937 and closed to goods on 16 May 1949. The nearby siding remained in use for W Evans trucks.

| Preceding station | Disused railways | Following station |
|---|---|---|
| New Inn Bridge Halt; Line and station closed | North Pembrokeshire and Fishguard Railway | Letterston; Line and station closed |
