= Kevin Allen (director) =

Welsh director (born 1959)

- Born: Kevin Edward Allen; 15 September 1959 (age 67); Gosport, Hampshire, England
- Education: Mountview Academy of Theatre Arts
- Occupations: Actor; director; producer; writer
- Relatives: Keith Allen (brother); Lily Allen (niece); Alfie Allen (nephew)

Kevin Edward Allen (born 15 September 1959) is an English actor, director, producer and writer. Allen came to prominence in 1987 in Hardwicke House and again, with the 1991 BBC film On the March with Bobby's Army, and for writing and directing his debut feature film, Twin Town, in 1997. He directed and co-wrote the film adaptation of Dylan Thomas' "Under Milk Wood", submitted for Best Foreign Language Film at the 2015 Oscars ceremony but not nominated, the Hollywood feature films, The Big Tease and Agent Cody Banks 2: Destination London, and the first series of ITV's Benidorm, along with numerous other films and documentaries.

Allen assisted Swansea City Council's 2017 bid to become the 2021 UK City of Culture. He is often cited as a figure in the Cool Cymru era.

== Early life ==
Allen is the son of Elizabeth Mary Allen and Edward Charles Allen, a submarine engineer in the Royal Navy. He is the younger brother of comedian/actor Keith Allen, and uncle of both singer-songwriter Lily Allen and Game of Thrones actor Alfie Allen. He was born in Gosport, England, but spent most of his childhood in Wales and British military outposts such as Malta and Singapore, where he attended Royal Naval schools, before the family settled back in Loughor in West Glamorgan, Wales, in 1969. There he went to Penyrheol Comprehensive School. Allen made his stage debut in a Gang Show with the 1st Loughor Scout Troop and was a founding member of the West Glamorgan County Youth Theatre and a member of the National Youth Theatre of Wales, before choosing the Mountview Academy of Theatre Arts over completing his A levels.

== Career ==
=== 1990s ===
During the early 1990s Allen had minor roles in the BBC's The Trials of Oz and in Channel 4's "Look at it This Way". He appeared in several episodes of The Comic Strip, French and Saunders, Murder Most Horrid and Bottom.

He appeared in Ben Elton's play Silly Cow at the Theatre Royal, Haymarket, and in Howard Brenton's Berlin Bertie at London's Royal Court Theatre. He received a Fringe First Theatre Award at the Edinburgh Festival in 1988 for his starring role in Sean Mathias' A Prayer for Wings directed by Dame Joan Plowright.

Allen made "On The March With Bobby's Army" (BBC–1991) – a 2-hour solo undercover film covering English football supporters at the Italia 90 World Cup. He presented the BBC football series Standing Room Only and wrote and directed several documentaries for the BBC, including "Bombay Brown Wash", "Booze, Barbours, Bores and Brilliance", and "Rotten to the Core".

In 1995 Allen appeared as DC Kray in the first series of BBC's sitcom The Thin Blue Line.

Allen's debut feature movie was Twin Town. It was BAFTA-nominated and a BAFTA Cymru winner and premiered at the 1997 Sundance Film Festival. Twin Town was also nominated for a Golden Bear Award at the Berlin International Film Festival and helped launch the film careers of actors Rhys Ifans and Dougray Scott.

After this, he went on to direct Hollywood feature film The Big Tease.

=== 2000s ===
He supervised and developed projects in Hollywood including 'Coming Out' for Milk Wood Films and 'Cheek to Cheek'‚ a feature film collaboration with Gene Wilder. Allen set up Airstream Films at this time‚ developing a diverse slate of feature projects with his producing partner, Kate McCreery.

He then directed Agent Cody Banks 2: Destination London.

After his mainstream success, Allen chose to bow out of Hollywood, so he relocated in 2004 with his young family to the outskirts of Clones, a small town in County Monaghan in the Republic of Ireland, where he designed and built a timber eco-house and became a rare-breed pig farmer.

In 2005 Allen adapted Louis Stevenson's novel, Treasure Island, as a feature Film and TV series for Working Title Films.

Allen directed the first series of ITV's Benidorm in 2007, for which he was nominated for his second BAFTA award.

Allen and playwright/novelist Patrick McCabe were organisers and creative directors of The Flat Lake Literary & Arts Festival which was held annually for five years in County Monaghan, Ireland from 2007 to 2011. The Flat Lake was a favourite performing venue of Poet Laureate Seamus Heaney, Colm Toibin and other Irish writers.

=== 2010s ===
In 2013 Allen directed "Y-Syrcas (S4C)" which was nominated for a BAFTA Cymru Award. Y-Syrcas also won the audience and jury awards at The European Minority Language Film Festival 2014.

Allen's film version of Dylan Thomas' Under Milk Wood was shot in two language versions, English and Welsh, and the Welsh film was selected as the British entry for the Best Foreign Language Film at the 88th Academy Awards. and was nominated for a BAFTA award in 2015 and several BAFTA Cymru awards. He played a key role in assisting Swansea City Council's 2017 bid to become the 2021 UK City of Culture.

In 2019 he set up The Mobile Film School, a film-maker mentoring concept devised by Allen to teach people to make films using smartphone camera technology.

=== 2020s ===
Allen shot feature film La Cha-Cha, during the Covid lockdown summer of 2020. La Cha-Cha was shot entirely on iPhones with Moondog anamorphic lenses and produced through his Mobile Film School. La Cha-Cha was released in Summer 2021 and is described by Allen as a counterculture Rom-Com.

Allen is also developing a Twin Town follow up titled Tin Town, a feature film set in the world of home grown cannabis in Llanelli, and another film titled The Crucible, a period TV series set in 19th Century Merthyr Tydfil during the industrial revolution.

In 2024, Allen is conducting a Q&A tour across Wales from February to April, celebrating the 25th anniversary of cult classic Twin Town. From April to July 2024, Allen was an Artist-in-Residence at the Villa Waldberta in Bavaria.

== Personal life ==
Allen is a supporter of Welsh independence. "Independence for Wales finally feels like a reality worth talking seriously," he said. "If we can alter the perception that the traditional cultural elite is making way for a diverse reflection of our society from which to govern a truly independent Wales, then you can most definitely count me in, we have nothing to lose and everything to gain."

== Select filmography ==
=== As actor ===
- 1983, Johnny Jarvis (TV mini series)
- 1987, Hardwicke House (TV series)
- 1990–1996, French and Saunders (TV series)
- 1992, Look at It This Way (TV mini series)
- 1995, The Thin Blue Line (TV series)
- 1997, Twin Town

=== As director ===
- 1991, Video Diaries, Episode: On the March with Bobby's Army (TV series documentary)
- 1997, Twin Town
- 1999, The Big Tease
- 2004, Agent Cody Banks 2: Destination London
- 2007, Benidorm (TV series)
- 2015, Under Milk Wood
- 2021, La Cha Cha
