= Jenny Evans (journalist) =

Welsh journalist

- Born: Abergavenny, Wales
- Education: Royal Central School of Speech and Drama

Jenny Evans is an investigative journalist and producer. As a teenager she starred in a movie, Twin Town. Her 2025 memoir documents her thirty-year search for justice, after being sexually assaulted.

== Life and career ==
Evans grew up in Abergavenny, with an older brother, Will. Her father, Keith Evans, died when she was 13. Her brother died in a house fire in Bristol, in 2001.

== Career ==
As a teenager, Evans made her debut film appearance in 1997 in the dark comedy Twin Town. This film has been described as a cult classic. Soon after making the film, Evans was sexually assaulted in London by a public figure and his friend. She left acting, but after studying for a degree at the Royal Central School of Speech and Drama, went on to became an investigative journalist, producer and documentary maker.

Her producing and directing credits include the 2017 Channel 4 documentary on the wealth gap in Britain seen through the lens of two dogs, Rich Dog, Poor Dog

In 2025, Evans published her memoir, Don't Let it Break You, Honey. The title of the memoir came from words that Maya Angelou said to Evans, after they met at the Hay Festival when Evans was a teenager. Evans’ memoir documents her search for justice after her sexual assault; and of the chain of events that followed, when her disclosures to the police ended up being printed in the tabloid newspapers. Evans worked as a researcher for the investigative journalist Nick Davies, whose work uncovered the depths of the phone hacking scandal. Evans' search for justice took many years. In 2014, she received a formal apology from the Metropolitan Police for their role in leaking information. The book was longlisted for the 2026 Women's Prize for Non-Fiction.

== Filmography ==
Year	Title	Role	Notes
1997	Twin Town	Bonny Cartwright	
2021	La Cha Cha	Brenda Whippy	
