= Clynderwen =

Village and community in Pembrokeshire, Wales

Clynderwen: Welsh: Clunderwen
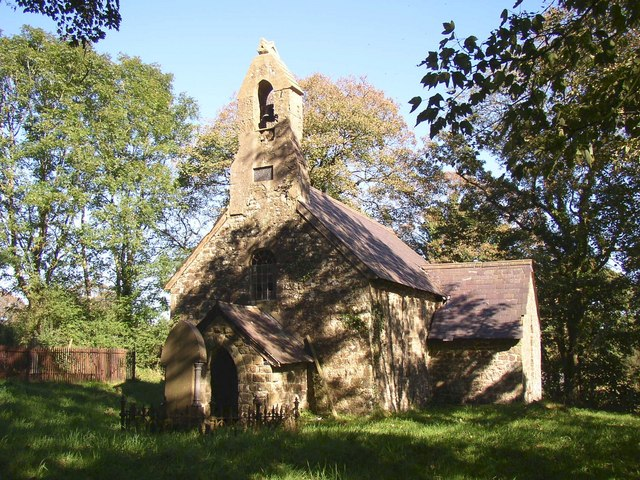
- Castelldwyran Church, Clynderwen

- Location within Pembrokeshire
- Population: 932 (2011)
- OS grid reference: SN133198
- Principal area: Pembrokeshire
- Country: Wales
- Sovereign state: United Kingdom
- Post town: Clynderwen
- Postcode district: SA66 7
- Dialling code: 01437
- Police: Dyfed-Powys
- Fire: Mid and West Wales
- Ambulance: Welsh
- UK Parliament: Preseli Pembrokeshire
- Senedd Cymru – Welsh Parliament: Ceredigion Penfro
- List of places UK Wales Pembrokeshire 51.831496°N 4.695005°W Map of the community

Clynderwen, or Clunderwen (Welsh pronunciation), is a rural linear village and community in Pembrokeshire, Wales, which was historically part of the county of Carmarthenshire. It lies on the A478 Tenby to Cardigan road south of the village of Llandissilio and north of the town of Narberth.

The village has its own community council of 10 members.

== Name ==
The Welsh name "Clunderwen", translating into English as "oak thicket", was first used for an estate of the same name. On 1 April 2003, the village was transferred from the administrative county of Carmarthenshire to that of Pembrokeshire, following a boundary change between the counties. The name of the community council is officially spelt Clunderwen.

== History ==
The earliest known record of Clynderwen is in 1822: a mansion and farm of that name, the Clynderwen Estate, is to the east of the present village and may have dated back to the 17th century. Robert Frederick Gower, High Sheriff of Pembrokeshire in 1844, whose son Erasmus Gower rose to the rank of admiral, owned Clyn Derwen (sic).

Clynderwen was listed in The Welsh Church Year Book of 1929 as having a Chapel of Ease in the parish of Llanfallteg with Clynderwen with Castell Dwyran and had been listed in the parish of Castell Dwyran since before 1850.

The village developed after the advent of the railway in 1854. The Great Western Railway (West Wales Line) to London from the ports of Milford Haven and Fishguard passes through the village at Clunderwen railway station. From 1876 a light railway, the Narberth Road and Maenclochog Railway ran from Clynderwen to Rosebush slate quarries via Maenclochog. The line was closed to passengers in 1937 and to freight in 1949.

The railway encouraged the development of the local economies and Clynderwen became a focus for agricultural produce and livestock shipment. Clynderwen and Cardiganshire Farmers cooperative opened its first branch in the village in 1904, the first of 22 covering much of Wales. The cooperative was a prime mover in a number of agricultural advances and projects beneficial to the farming community particularly during the depression in the 1920s and the technical revolutions after World War 2. The Clynderwen Agricultural Society was established in 1911 and held an annual show until 1963 and from 1979 to the present. The Clynderwen Young Farmers Club, established 1929, was the first in Wales.

The village was notable for the efforts of the brothers Howard and Herbert James who in 1913 were the first men in Pembrokeshire to build and fly their own aircraft.

There are 18 listed structures in the community.

== Education ==
Clynderwen is home to Redhill High School, an independent co-educational secondary school, associated with Redhill Preparatory School at Haverfordwest. The school occupies the historic building of Clynderwen House, and opened in 2018, teaching up to year 13 with a maximum class size of 20.
