= Twin Town =

1997 British dark comedy film

- Theatrical release poster
- Directed by: Kevin Allen
- Written by: Kevin Allen; Paul Durden
- Produced by: Peter McAleese
- Starring: Dougray Scott; Dorien Thomas; William Thomas; Sue Roderick; Rhys Ifans; Llŷr Ifans
- Cinematography: John Mathieson
- Edited by: Oral Norrie Ottey
- Music by: Mark Thomas
- Production companies: Agenda; Aimimage Productions; Figment Films
- Distributed by: PolyGram Filmed Entertainment
- Release date: 11 April 1997
- Running time: 99 minutes
- Country: United Kingdom
- Languages: English; Welsh
- Budget: £1.7 million

Twin Town is a 1997 British dark comedy crime film, filmed mainly around Port Talbot and set in Swansea, Wales. It was directed by Kevin Allen and had a working title of Hot Dog; a hot dog van features in a number of scenes in the film. It stars real-life brothers Rhys Ifans (in his first major movie role) and Llŷr Ifans (credited as Llyr Evans) along with Dougray Scott. The director appears on screen, briefly seen as a show host on a TV set in the static caravan home of the twins while co-writer Paul Durden briefly appears as a rude taxi driver.

== Plot ==
Set in Port Talbot and Swansea, the Lewis "twins" of the title are not twins but brothers. They live with their parents and sister Adie in a caravan on a mobile home site. Constantly mocking their sister's employment at a local massage parlour, they spend most of their time joking around, taking drugs and stealing cars.

Their father, "Fatty" Lewis, falls from a ladder while doing roofing work for Bryn Cartwright, a wealthy, prominent local businessman and small-time gangster. Laying blame, the twins attempt to demand workers' compensation for the accident. Bryn claims it was a cash arrangement with no legal representation and refuses the request for compensation. The twins take this personally and seek revenge by gatecrashing and ruining a local karaoke competition in which Bryn's daughter, beautiful Bonny is singing, by appearing from back stage and urinating on her during the performance in the Barons nightclub in Swansea. Bryn vows to get even and acquires the help of his associates, two corrupt police officers, Greyo and Terry Walsh to assist him getting revenge on the twins. After several efforts to disrupt their way of life, Bryn appears to succeed by having one of the detectives to assist him in beating up the twins down a back street.

As retaliation continues, the feud spirals out of control, progressing with the twins breaking into Bryn's property and beheading the Cartwrights' pet poodle. Terry responds by setting fire to the Lewis' dog's kennel with their pet inside. However, an adjacent gas bottle explodes, destroying the Lewises' mobile home and killing the twins' family. Clearly upset, the twins make arrangements with the local male voice choir and steal their father's hearse at his funeral. Terry meanwhile, much to Greyo's distress, accuses Fatty's co-workers Dai and Chip of destroying the caravan by placing items from the scene of the crime in their builder's van. The twins soon come down from the hills where they have been hiding out and go after Bryn, breaking into his house again and tying him up with washing line rigged to his own electric garage door. The twins ask to borrow Bryn's boat to which he agrees, with the hope of the twins letting him go unhurt. The twins disappear leaving Bryn tied up and at the brink of asphyxiation in his own garage. When his wife Lucy arrives later that evening, she attempts to use the electric gate remote from outside while returning home, causing the garage door to lift, hanging Bryn. On looking under the door and discovering the hanging, Lucy hysterically runs through the house and finds their daughter floating on a lilo in their indoor swimming pool listening to music through headphones, blissfully unaware of what has gone on.

The twins consider their job done and carry out their father's wish of having a burial at sea with the assistance of Bryn's boat, with the coffin respectfully draped in the Welsh flag. It is a poignant moment as the local choir (formed from a number of real-life local male voice choirs) sing the Welsh language song Myfanwy at the end of Mumbles Pier. Meanwhile, Terry, terrified and pleading, has been gagged and bound to the coffin, and lowered into the sea just off the pier head of Mumbles Swansea. The coffin floats for a while before the twins make a bet on how long it would stay afloat, seemingly brushing aside the emotion of their father's funeral at sea.

The coffin sinks and a few tears are shed by the twins. They then question each other on how far the boat would travel and imply that they would be heading to Morocco. The boat is last seen heading out to sea, driven by the twins to a haunting choir still singing on Mumbles Pier.

== Cast ==
- Llŷr Ifans as Julian Lewis
- Rhys Ifans as Jeremy Lewis
- Huw Ceredig as Fatty Lewis
- Rachel Scorgie as Adie Lewis
- Di Botcher as Jean Lewis
- Dougray Scott as D.I Terry Walsh
- Dorien Thomas as D.S Alan 'Greyo' Grey
- William Thomas as Bryn Cartwright
- Jenny Evans as Bonny Cartwright
- Sue Roderick as Lucy Cartwright
- Brian Hibbard as Dai Rhys
- Morgan Hopkins as Chip Roberts
- Buddug Williams as Mrs Mort
- Ronnie Williams as Mr Mort
- Boyd Clack as the Vicar

== Reception ==
On Rotten Tomatoes the film has a score of 46% based on reviews from 13 critics.

Roger Ebert gave the film two stars out of four, saying that he "was not sure where the movie wanted to go and what it wanted to do--this despite the fact that it goes many places and does too much." He also compared it unfavourably to Trainspotting, which had been released the previous year. William Thomas of Empire gave it 4 out of 5 and wrote that the film "is low-life and proud of it. It's gritty, brutal and not for the faint of heart." He called the comparisons to Trainspotting "a masterstroke of marketing but far from accurate".

The film was entered into the 47th Berlin International Film Festival.

It is the favourite movie of the Welsh former international rugby union referee, Nigel Owens.

Composer Mark Thomas won a BAFTA Cymru award for his work on the film.

== Documentary and sequel ==
The 1997 TV documentary Shoot Out in Swansea: The Making of Twin Town by Richard Barber, looked at the making of Twin Town and featured interviews with the cast and crew of the film.

In April 2009, director Kevin Allen revealed plans for a sequel, explaining that Rhys and Llŷr Ifans were willing to reprise their roles, which would see them returning from Africa as Islamic converts. The sequel did not materialise, however, when Allen changed career and became a pig farmer in Ireland three years later. In 2016 Allen stated, in a Wales Online article, that he was working on a sequel set around the Llanelli area; Allen said it would again be a comedy, but with a political spin regarding the legalisation of marijuana.

== See also ==
- Mine All Mine
- Cinema of Wales
- List of Welsh films
- List of British films
