= Buddug Williams =

Welsh actress (1932–2021)

Buddug Williams (1932 – 24 July 2021) was a Welsh actress, best known for her roles in the long-running television soap Pobol y Cwm on S4C – first as the mother of Sabrina and Reg. She had a long-running role playing 'Anti' Marian Rees – the fearsome, gossipy, opinionated shopkeeping auntie of the hapless Denzil – from 2000 to 2016. The character died in her sleep in her armchair at Penrhewl farm.

Prior to her acting career, Williams worked as a teacher. Her autobiography, Merch o'r Cwm, written in Welsh, was published in 2008. In it she described her upbringing in Cefneithin and mentioned her friendships with Ronnie Williams and Carwyn James. Williams died on 24 July 2021, at the age of 88.

== Film and television ==
Year	Title	Role	Notes
1997	Twin Town	Mrs Mort	Black comedy
2000–2016	Pobol y Cwm	'Anti' Marian Rees	
2001	Very Annie Mary	Buddug Mair Williams	TV film
