= The Big Tease =

- Theatrical release poster
- Directed by: Kevin Allen
- Written by: Sacha Gervasi; Craig Ferguson
- Produced by: Philip Rose
- Starring: Craig Ferguson; Frances Fisher; Mary McCormack; David Rasche; Chris Langham
- Cinematography: Seamus McGarvey
- Edited by: Chris Peppe
- Music by: Mark Thomas
- Production companies: Crawford P. Productions; I Should Coco Films
- Distributed by: Warner Bros.
- Release dates: October 15, 1999 (Chicago); January 28, 2000 (United States)
- Running time: 86 minutes
- Countries: United States; United Kingdom
- Language: English

The Big Tease is a 1999 American comedy film starring Craig Ferguson, directed by Kevin Allen, and written by Ferguson and Sacha Gervasi. The cast includes Frances Fisher, Mary McCormack, Chris Langham, and David Rasche. The film follows a Scottish hairdresser who comes to Hollywood to compete in an international hairdressing contest. Drew Carey, Caitlyn Jenner, David Hasselhoff, and John Paul DeJoria appear in cameo roles. The Big Tease premiered at the Chicago International Film Festival on October 15, 1999. It received a limited release in North American theaters on January 28, 2000.

== Plot ==
Crawford Mackenzie is a gay Scottish hairdresser who, while being filmed as part of a fly-on-the-wall BBC documentary, is invited to the World Hairdresser International Federation annual contest. The documentary team follows Crawford to L.A., where he discovers that his invitation is to be a member of the audience rather than a competitor. He eventually weasels his way into the contest and produces the greatest creation of his career.

== Cast ==
- Craig Ferguson as Crawford Mackenzie
- Frances Fisher as Candace "Candy" Harper
- Mary McCormack as Monique Geingold
- Chris Langham as Martin Samuels, BBC Interviewer
- David Rasche as Stig Ludwigssen
- Donal Logue as Eamonn McGarvey
- Larry Miller as Dunstan Cactus
- Isabella Aitken as Mrs. Beasie Mackenzie
- Kevin Allen as Gareth Trundle
- Angela McCluskey as Senga Magoogan
- Francine York as Elegant Woman
- Nina Siemaszko as Betty Fuego
- Charles Napier as Sen. Warren Crockett
- Melissa Rivers as Dianne Abbott (credited as Melissa Rosenberg)
- David Hasselhoff as himself
- Drew Carey as himself
- Cathy Lee Crosby as herself
- Kylie Bax as herself
- Veronica Webb as herself
- John Paul DeJoria as himself (referred to as John Paul Mitchell)

== Production ==
It was filmed on location in Glasgow and Los Angeles. The inspiration for this film came from Craig Ferguson's desire to make a cheerful film celebrating Scottishness, as opposed to the epic nature of films like Braveheart and Rob Roy, or the downbeat quality of Trainspotting and Shallow Grave.

The script was snapped up by Warner Bros. Pictures after a bidding war. Warner Bros. was the only studio prepared to immediately greenlight the film. A fast turnaround was required so it could be shot while Ferguson was on hiatus from The Drew Carey Show.

Craig Ferguson attended a hairdressing institute to learn all about the art of hairdressing. The hairpieces used in the final Platinum Scissors competition were made from real human hair, and each hairpiece weighed about 4 pounds (1.8 kg).

The Big Tease was not the only hairdressing film in development at the time; The Big Tease was released first in 1999, causing Blow Dry, another British film about a hairdressing competition, to be delayed until 2001. Warner Bros. marketed the film as "Rocky with Curlers".

== Reception ==
On the review aggregator website Rotten Tomatoes, 56% of 39 critics' reviews are positive, with an average rating of 5.5/10. The website's consensus reads: "The Big Tease may be predictable, but the buoyant performances keep you laughing once you give in to the silliness." On Metacritic, the film has an average weighted score of 53 out of 100 based on 23 critics' reviews, indicating "mixed or average reviews."

Stephen Holden of The New York Times gave a positive review in which he wrote, "If you have overdosed on the preening narcissism and nutty hyperbole of recent Hollywood awards ceremonies and their surrounding hoopla, this funny but ramshackle movie might be the purgative you need." Variety's Derek Elley wrote, "Ferguson and co-scripter Sacha Gervasi have a fine ear for the vocabulary and cadences of L.A.-speak, and are at pains to show that Crawford is every bit as shallow and manipulative as the people he encounters."
