= Martell Bridge Halt railway station =

Short-lived railway station in Little Newcastle, Pembrokeshire

Martell Bridge Halt

General information
- Location: Little Newcastle, Pembrokeshire; Wales
- Coordinates: 51.9205°N 4.9155°W
- Grid reference: SM996286
- Platforms: 1

Other information
- Status: Disused

History
- Original company: Great Western Railway
- Post-grouping: Great Western Railway

Key dates
- 1 January 1930: Opened
- 25 October 1937: Closed
Location

Martell Bridge Halt railway station served the village of Little Newcastle, Pembrokeshire, Wales, from 1930 to 1937 on the North Pembrokeshire and Fishguard Railway.

== History ==
The station opened on 1 January 1930 by the Great Western Railway. It was situated on the east side of a minor road on the C3009. The local area was known as Mattel but GWR misspelled it as 'Martell'. This spelling error was not corrected in Bradshaw or on the tickets. There were only 70-80 tickets sold per week, thus it closed on 25 October 1937.

Preceding station	Disused railways	Following station
Castlebythe Halt; Line and station closed	North Pembrokeshire and Fishguard Railway	Beulah Halt; Line and station closed
