= Castlebythe Halt railway station =

Short-lived railway station in Pembrokeshire, Wales

Castlebythe Halt

General information
- Location: Puncheston, Pembrokeshire; Wales
- Coordinates: 51.9274°N 4.8976°W
- Grid reference: SN008294
- Platforms: 1

Other information
- Status: Disused

History
- Original company: Great Western Railway
- Post-grouping: Great Western Railway

Key dates
- 24 September 1928: Opened
- 25 October 1937: Closed
Location

Castlebythe Halt railway station served the village of Puncheston, Pembrokeshire, Wales, from 1928 to 1937 on the North Pembrokeshire and Fishguard Railway.

== History ==
The station opened on 24 September 1928 by the Great Western Railway. It was situated closer to Puncheston village than the original station was. It only had 85–90 passengers a week; thus it closed on 25 October 1937.

Preceding station	Disused railways	Following station
Puncheston; Line and station closed	North Pembrokeshire and Fishguard Railway	Martell Bridge Halt; Line and station closed
