= Llanycefn railway station =

Disused railway station in Maenclochog, Pembrokeshire

Maenclochog

General information
- Location: Maenclochog, Pembrokeshire; Wales
- Coordinates: 51.8789°N 4.7625°W
- Grid reference: SN099236
- Platforms: 1

Other information
- Status: Disused

History
- Original company: Narberth Road and Maenclochog Railway
- Pre-grouping: Great Western Railway
- Post-grouping: Great Western Railway

Key dates
- 19 September 1876: Opened
- 1 January 1883: Closed
- December 1884: Reopened
- 31 March 1885: Closed again
- 21 March 1887: Reopened again
- 25 May 1887: Closed again
- 11 April 1895: Reopened again
- 8 January 1917: Closed again
- 12 July 1920: Reopened for the last time
- 25 October 1937: Closed permanently to passengers
- 16 May 1949: Closed to goods
Location

Llanycefn railway station, also known as Llan-y-cefn railway station, served the hamlet of Llanycefn, Pembrokeshire in the parish of Maenclochog, Wales, from 1876 to 1949 on the Narberth Road and Maenclochog Railway.

== History ==
The station opened on 19 September 1876 by the Narberth Road and Maenclochog Railway. To the south was a goods siding which only handled parcels and a few other miscellaneous goods. The points were operated by a ground frame. There was also a signal box south of the level crossing. The station closed and reopened a lot, first closing on 1 January 1883, reopening in December 1884, closing again on 31 March 1885, reopening again on 21 March 1887, closing yet again on 25 May 1887, reopening yet again on 11 April 1895 when the line was extended closing on 8 January 1917 and reopening one last time on 12 July 1920. The signal box closed in 1923. It closed to passengers permanently on 25 October 1937 and closing to goods traffic on 16 May 1949.

Preceding station	Disused railways	Following station
Beag Fair Siding; Line and station closed	Narberth Road and Maenclochog Railway	Maenclochog; Line and station closed
