= Letterston railway station =

Disused railway station in Letterston, Pembrokeshire

Letterston
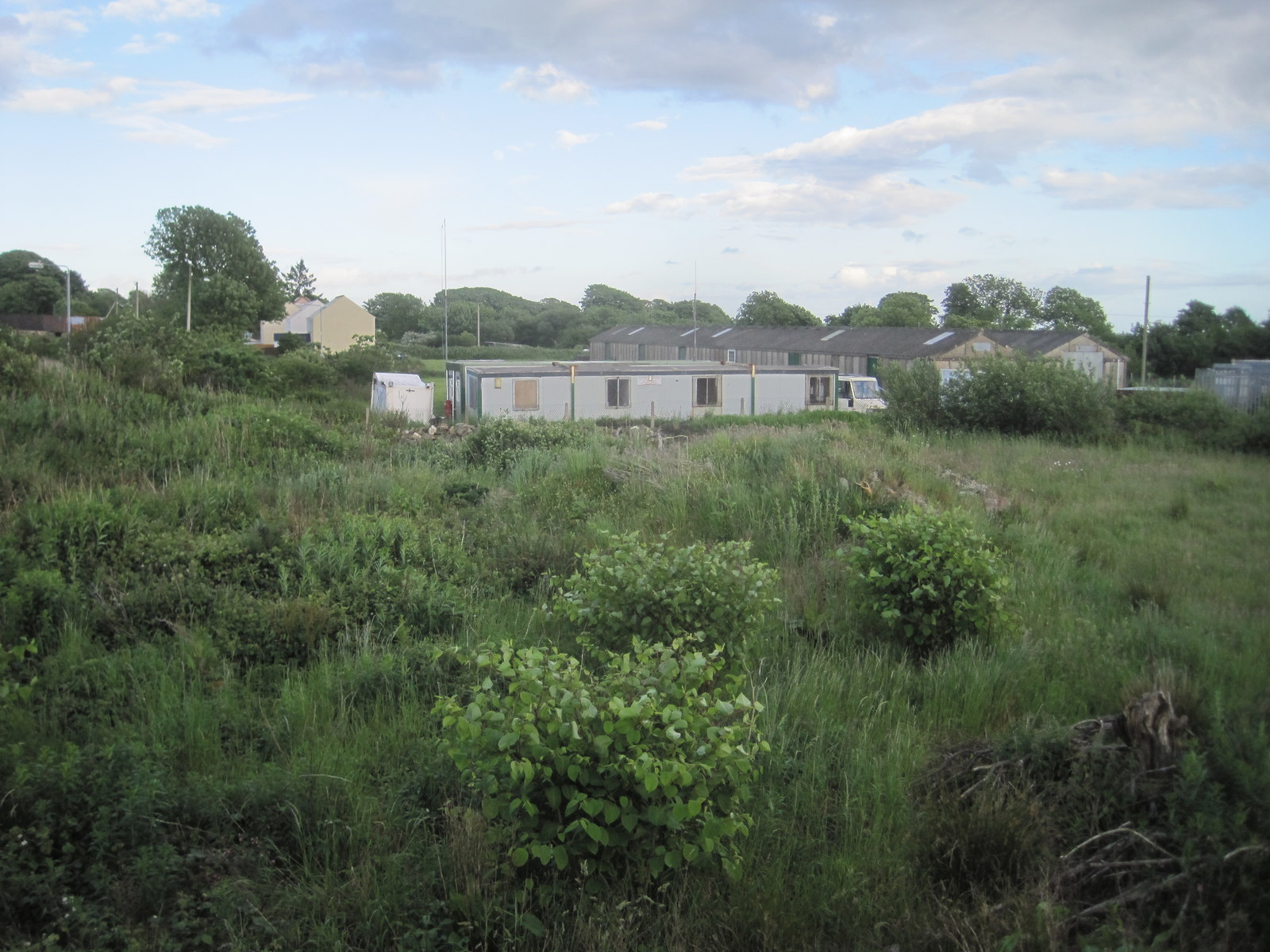

General information
- Location: Letterston, Pembrokeshire; Wales
- Coordinates: 51.9281°N 4.9786°W
- Grid reference: SM953297
- Platforms: 1 (initially); 2 (later added)

Other information
- Status: Disused

History
- Original company: North Pembrokeshire and Fishguard Railway
- Pre-grouping: North Pembrokeshire and Fishguard Railway
- Post-grouping: Great Western Railway

Key dates
- 11 April 1895: Opened
- 25 October 1937: Closed to passengers
- 1 March 1965: Closed
Location

Letterston railway station served the parish of Letterston, Pembrokeshire, Wales, from 1895 to 1965 on the North Pembrokeshire and Fishguard Railway.

== History ==
The station opened on 11 April 1895 by the North Pembrokeshire and Fishguard Railway. It was situated on the east side of Station Road. The opposite of the platform was a goods yard which had six sidings and a goods shed. In 1899, a second platform and a signal box were added when the line was extended to Goodwick. The box was situated at the end of the original platform. When services to Clynderwen were stopped in 1917, Letterston stayed open for diverted services from Fishguard to Neyland. This didn't last long and the track was later lifted and taken to France. The normal services resumed on 9 July 1923. The signal box closed in 1926 and was replaced by a ground frame. The station closed on 25 October 1937. It remained open for goods traffic until 1 March 1965.

Preceding station	Disused railways	Following station
Beulah Halt; Line and station closed	North Pembrokeshire and Fishguard Railway	Goodwick; Line closed, station open
