= Llŷr Ifans =

Welsh actor

Llŷr Evans
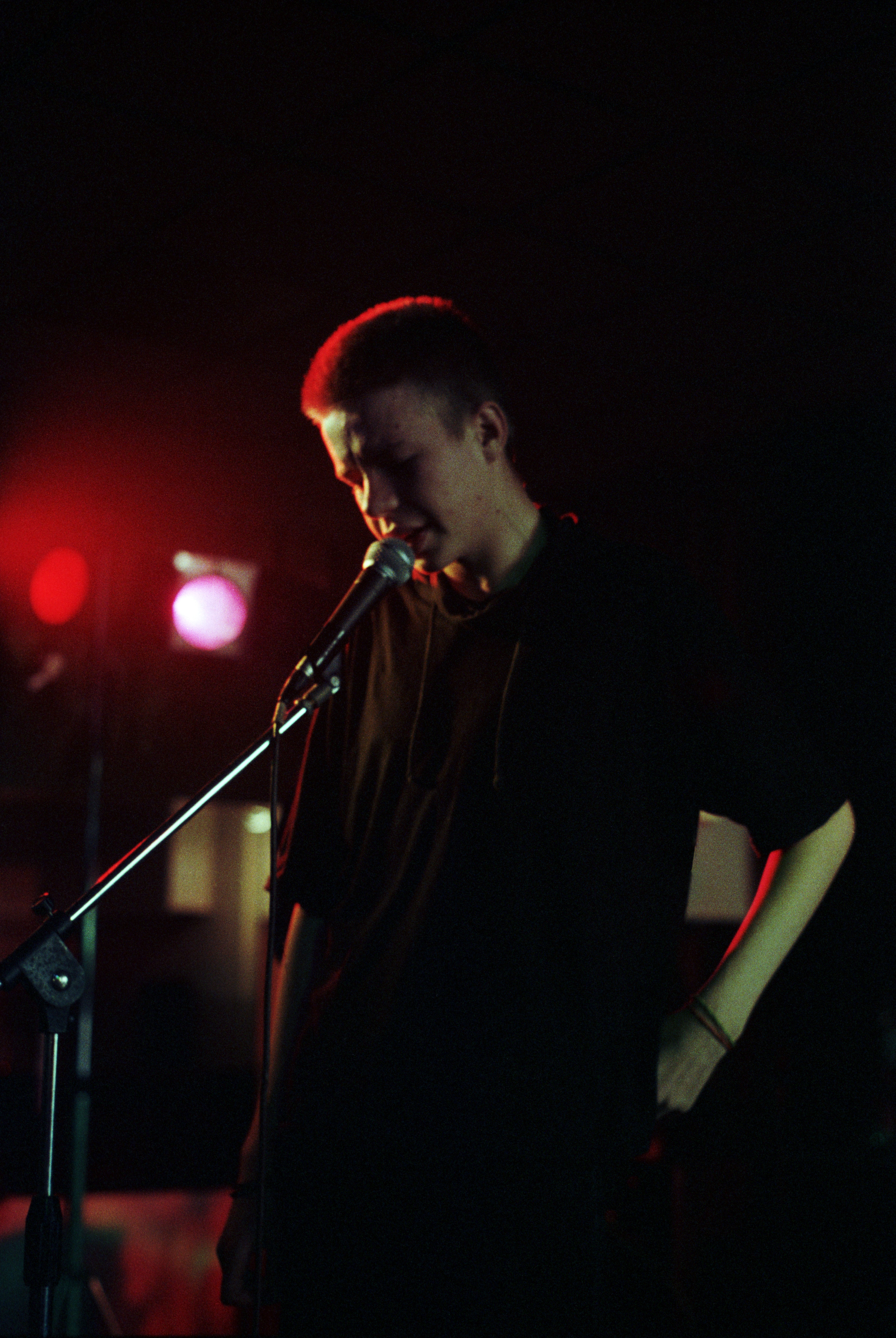
- Ifans in 1989
- Born: Ruthin, Denbighshire, Wales
- Other name: Llŷr Ifans
- Occupation: Actor
- Years active: 1994–present
- Spouse: Lisa Gwilym
- Children: 1
- Relatives: Rhys Ifans (brother)

Llŷr Evans (Welsh pronunciation: [ɬɨːr ˈivans]), also known as Llŷr Ifans, is a Welsh actor.

== Career ==
Llyr Ifans is best known for appearing opposite his brother Rhys Ifans in the cult film, Twin Town, in 1997. A sequel with the suggested title Swansea Al Akbar was mooted but the plans were abandoned in 2011.

In September 2007, Ifans appeared at Clwyd Theatr Cymru in their production of A Toy Epic, which ran at the Mold venue and then was taken on a short tour around Wales.

He also appeared in the short Welsh-language television drama S.O.S. Galw Gari Tryfan.

In 2015, Ifans gave "an enjoyably louche performance as the town's resident middle-aged delinquent, Nogood Boyo" in the S4C film of Dylan Thomas's Under Milk Wood.

In 2026 he will voice the character C-3PO in the Welsh dub of Star Wars: Episode IV – A New Hope.

== Personal life ==
He is the younger brother of actor Rhys Ifans who appeared with him in the film Twin Town. Both speak Welsh and English. Llŷr is married to BBC Radio Cymru DJ and television presenter Lisa Gwilym and they live in Y Felinheli.

Ifans is a supporter of Welsh independence. "Our industry, culture and economy have suffered greatly – but there is no point looking back at the injustices of the past," he said. "It is time for us to show the world that we are a modern and confident country, that we are proud of our bilingualism and are ready to take the next big step towards independence. It's inevitable that we will make mistakes along the way but we will learn from them as they will be our own mistakes, and we won't have to suffer as a result of the mistakes and patronising attitudes of others".

== Selected filmography ==
- Ymadawiad Arthur (Arthur's Departure) (1994)
- Twin Town (1997) (as Llŷr Evans)
- Very Annie Mary (2001) (as Llŷr Evans)
- Yr Heliwr (A Mind to Kill):
  - Bloodline episode (1995) (as Llŷr Evans)
  - Engineer episode (2002) (as Llŷr Evans)
- Y Syrcas (The Circus) (2013)
- Star Wars: Gobaith Newydd (2026) (Welsh dub)
