= Rhys Ifans =

Welsh actor and musician (born 1967)

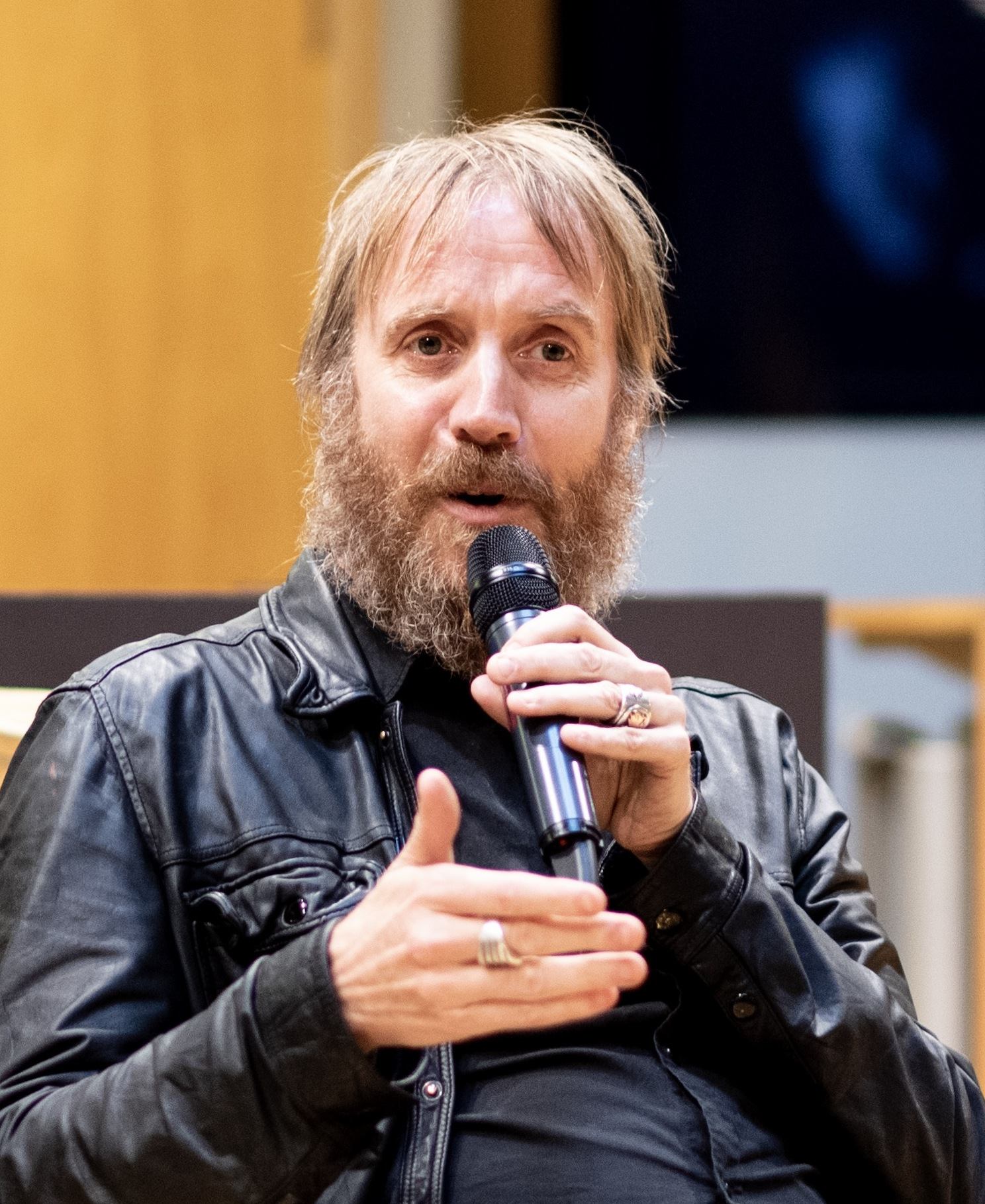
- Ifans in 2019
- Born: Rhys Owain Evans; 22 July 1967 (age 59); Haverfordwest, Pembrokeshire, Wales
- Education: Guildhall School of Music and Drama
- Occupations: Actor; musician
- Years active: 1991–present
- Partners: Sienna Miller (2007–2008); Anna Friel (2011–2014)
- Relatives: Llŷr Ifans (brother)

Rhys Owain Evans (Welsh pronunciation: [r̥ɨːs ˈivans]; born 22 July 1967), known as Rhys Ifans, is a Welsh actor and musician. He has portrayed roles in Twin Town (1997), Dancing at Lughnasa (1998), Notting Hill (1999), Kevin & Perry Go Large (2000), Enduring Love (2004), and The Boat That Rocked (2009), in addition to Xenophilius Lovegood in Harry Potter and the Deathly Hallows – Part 1 (2010), Dr. Curt Connors / Lizard in The Amazing Spider-Man (2012) and Spider-Man: No Way Home (2021), and Grigori Rasputin in The King's Man (2021). His television roles include the Chief Designer in Star City, Hector DeJean in the Epix thriller series Berlin Station, Mycroft Holmes in the CBS series Elementary, and Otto Hightower in the HBO fantasy series House of the Dragon.

Ifans was also formerly the frontman of the rock bands The Peth and Super Furry Animals.

== Early life ==
Ifans was born Rhys Owain Evans in Haverfordwest on 22 July 1967, the son of nursery school teacher Beti-Wyn (née Davies) and primary school teacher Eirwyn Evans. His younger brother, Llŷr Ifans, is also an actor. He grew up in Ruthin, where he received his primary education at Ysgol Pentrecelyn and was raised speaking Welsh as his first language. He attended Ysgol Maes Garmon, a Welsh medium secondary school in Mold, where he took his O levels and A levels. He attended acting classes at Theatr Clwyd. After leaving school, he presented Welsh-language television programmes on S4C. He studied acting at the Guildhall School of Music and Drama in London, where he graduated in 1997.

== Career ==
=== Stage ===
Ifans' early stage work included Badfinger at Donmar Warehouse, Hamlet at Theatr Clwyd, A Midsummer Night's Dream at the Regent's Park Theatre, and Under Milk Wood and Volpone at the National Theatre. He appeared at the Donmar Warehouse in 2003's Accidental Death of an Anarchist. In 2006, he returned to the London stage in Michael Grandage's production of Don Juan in Soho at the Donmar Warehouse. In 2016, Ifans played Fool alongside Glenda Jackson in Deborah Warner's production of King Lear, at The Old Vic. He returned to The Old Vic to play Ebenezer Scrooge in Matthew Warchus' production of A Christmas Carol (adapted by Jack Thorne) in 2017 and in 2018 returned to the National Theatre to play King Berenger in Patrick Marber's new adaptation of Eugene Ionesco's Exit the King. Ifans was given the role of Atticus Finch in Aaron Sorkin's To Kill A Mockingbird to begin at London's Gielgud Theatre on 21 May 2020. The play was delayed due to the COVID-19 pandemic but was rescheduled for May 2021. The role of Atticus Finch was later given to Rafe Spall due to scheduling conflicts.

=== Television ===
Ifans appeared in many Welsh-language television programmes before embarking on his film career, including the comedy show Pobol y Chyff, as well as performing at the National Theatre, London and the Royal Exchange, Manchester. In 1990, he presented Stwnsh (Welsh for "Mash"), an anarchic children's quiz programme; 31 fifteen-minute programmes were broadcast on Welsh-language TV channel S4C.

In 2000, he narrated the children's animated series Sali Mali for S4C. In 2004, his performance as Peter Cook in the TV film Not Only But Always won him the BAFTA Best Actor at the 2005 British Academy Television Awards.

In 2005, Ifans made a guest appearance for the rock band Oasis in the video for their single "The Importance of Being Idle" (where he mimed to Noel Gallagher's vocals), for which he accepted their award for Video of the Year at the 2006 NME Awards. He has also appeared in the music videos for "God! Show Me Magic" and "Hometown Unicorn" by Super Furry Animals, "Mulder and Scully" by Catatonia, and "Mama Told Me Not to Come" by Tom Jones with Stereophonics.

In 2008, he appeared in "Six Days One June", one of three episodes of the TV series The Last Word Monologues, written by Hugo Blick and broadcast on BBC Two. He played a lonely Welsh farmer trying to free himself from a domineering mother.

From 2016 to 2019, Ifans portrayed hard-nosed American CIA case officer Hector DeJean in the U.S. pay-cable Epix network espionage thriller drama series Berlin Station, filmed on location in Berlin.

From 2022 to 2026, Ifans played Otto Hightower in the Game of Thrones prequel House of the Dragon, which premiered 21 August 2022.

=== Film ===
Following his role as Jeremy Lewis in the Swansea-based movie Twin Town (1997) alongside his brother Llŷr, Ifans gained international exposure in his role as slovenly housemate Spike in the British film Notting Hill (1999). Reportedly, in preparation for the role, Ifans did not wash or brush his teeth. He played Adrian, the pompous eldest brother in Little Nicky (2000). Other film roles include: Eyeball Paul in Kevin & Perry Go Large (2000), Nigel in The Replacements (2000), Iki in The 51st State (2001), William Dobbin in Vanity Fair (2004), and Vladis Grutas in Hannibal Rising (2007). He played Jed Parry in the 2004 film version of Ian McEwan's Enduring Love, and the lead role in Danny Deckchair (2003) as Danny Morgan.

Ifans revealed in March 2009 that he was to appear in Harry Potter and the Deathly Hallows – Part 1 (2010). He played Xenophillius Lovegood, editor of the wizarding magazine The Quibbler and father of the eccentric Luna Lovegood. In the same interview, he announced that he would play the title role in the film Mr. Nice, based on the life of the drug smuggler Howard Marks. He played Nemo Nobody's father in Mr. Nobody, and a villain in Nanny McPhee and the Big Bang.

On 11 October 2010 Associated Press confirmed that Ifans would portray the villain in the Spider-Man reboot film The Amazing Spider-Man. The villain was revealed as the Curt Connors / Lizard a few days later, and the film was released in July 2012. In 2015, Ifans starred in She's Funny That Way, directed by Peter Bogdanovich.

Ifans also starred in Steven Bernstein's Last Call, which was released theatrically, followed an extremely long delay, in the US on 25 November 2020. It is a surrealistic biopic, which recreates the life of Welsh poet Dylan Thomas through flashbacks during the famous drinking binge at the White Horse Tavern in New York City which ended fatally during the fall of 1953. It stars Ifans as Thomas alongside John Malkovich, Rodrigo Santoro, Romola Garai, Zosia Mamet, and Tony Hale.

On 16 November 2021 it was revealed, through the film's official trailer, that Ifans would reprise his role as Lizard from The Amazing Spider-Man in the Marvel Cinematic Universe film Spider-Man: No Way Home, to be released on 17 December. Later it was revealed that Ifans was not actually present on set and only lent his voice for the character created through digital means, with his human form at the end of the film being from archival footage from The Amazing Spider-Man.

Ifans also appeared as Grigori Rasputin in the spy film The King's Man, which was released in December 2021.

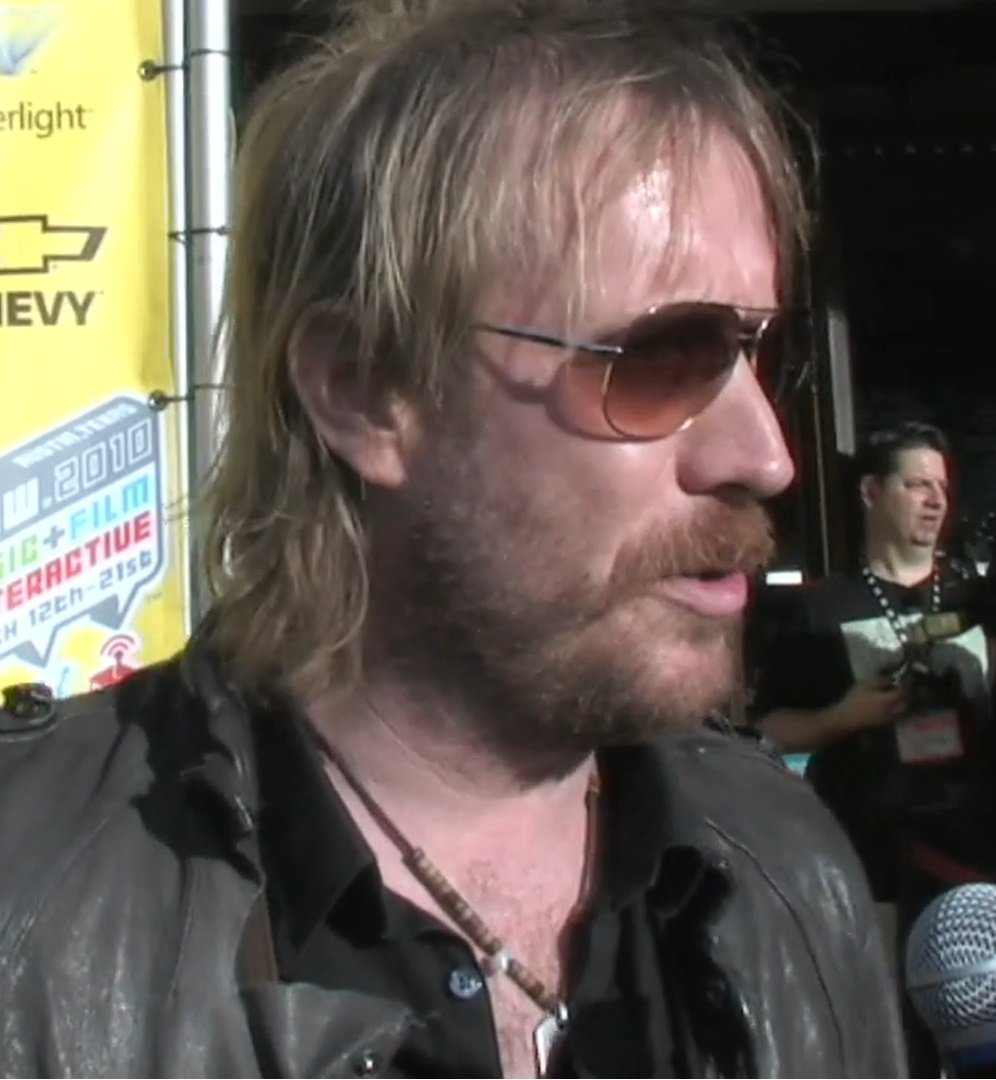
Ifans in 2010

Ifans will voice the character Obi-Wan Kenobi in Star Wars: Episode IV - A New Hope, which is to be dubbed into Welsh for the first time as the film prepares to celebrate its 50th anniversary in 2027.

=== Music ===
Ifans was briefly lead vocalist of the rock band Super Furry Animals before they released any records.

Since 2007, Ifans has sung with the psychedelic rock band The Peth ("peth" is Welsh for "thing"), featuring Super Furry Animals' Dafydd Ieuan, which played a number of concert dates in south Wales and in London in the autumn of 2008. In 2009 the band supported Oasis at a concert in the Millennium Stadium in Cardiff.

== Personal life ==
Ifans dated actress Sienna Miller from 2007 to 2008; Miller had accepted Ifans's marriage proposal before breaking up with him. He dated actress Anna Friel from 2011 to 2014.

In September 2012, Ifans became a patron of the Welsh-language Wikipedia, together with Dr Barry Morgan, the then Archbishop of Wales. In 2017, Ifans partnered with Shelter Cymru in a campaign called 7 Ways You Can End Homelessness. He also in 2017 supported the community purchase of Tafarn Sinc, a pub in his native Pembrokeshire that was facing closure.

== Filmography ==
=== Film ===
Key
†	Denotes films that have not yet been released

Year	Title	Role	Notes
1996	August	Griffiths	
1997	Twin Town	Jeremy Lewis	
1998	Dancing at Lughnasa	Gerry Evans	
1999	Heart	Alex Madden	
1999	You're Dead	Eddie	
1999	Notting Hill	Spike	
1999	Janice Beard 45 WPM	Sean	
1999	Hooves of Fire	Head Elf	Voice
2000	Rancid Aluminium	Pete Thompson	
2000	Love, Honour and Obey	Matthew	
2000	Kevin & Perry Go Large	Eyeball Paul	
2000	Sali Mali	Narrator	
2000	The Replacements	Nigel Gruff	
2000	Little Nicky	Adrian	
2001	Hotel	Trent Stoken	
2001	Christmas Carol: The Movie	Bob Cratchit	Voice
2001	The Shipping News	Beaufield Nutbeem	
2001	Human Nature	Puff	
2001	The 51st State/Formula 51	Iki	
2002	Once Upon a Time in the Midlands	Dek	
2003	Danny Deckchair	Danny Morgan	
2004	Vanity Fair	William Dobbin	
2004	Enduring Love	Jed	
2005	Midsummer Dream	Lysander	Voice: English version
2005	Chromophobia	Colin	
2006	Garfield: A Tail of Two Kitties	McBunny	Voice
2007	Four Last Songs	Dickie	
2007	Hannibal Rising	Grutas	
2007	Elizabeth: The Golden Age	Robert Reston	
2008	Come Here Today	Alex	
2009	The Informers	Roger	
2009	The Boat That Rocked	Gavin Kavanagh	
2009	Mr. Nobody	Nemo's Father	
2010	Mr. Nice	Howard Marks	
2010	Greenberg	Ivan Schrank	
2010	Passion Play	Sam Adamo	
2010	Nanny McPhee and the Big Bang	Uncle Phil	
2010	Harry Potter and the Deathly Hallows – Part 1	Xenophilius Lovegood	
2010	Exit Through the Gift Shop	Narrator	
2011	Anonymous	Edward de Vere	
2012	The Five-Year Engagement	Winton Childs	
2012	The Amazing Spider-Man	Dr. Curt Connors / Lizard	Nominated — Teen Choice Award for Choice Movie Villain
2013	Another Me	Don	
2014	Serena	Galloway	
2014	Madame Bovary	Monsieur Lheureux	
2015	Dominion	Dylan Thomas	
2015	She's Funny That Way	Seth Gilbert	
2015	Len and Company	Len Black	
2015	Under Milk Wood	Captain Cat	Also producer
2016	Alice Through the Looking Glass	Zanik Hightopp	
2016	Snowden	Corbin O'Brian	
2018	The Parting Glass	Karl	
2019	Official Secrets	Ed Vulliamy	
2020	Misbehaviour	Eric Morley	
2020	Last Call	Dylan Thomas	
2021	La Cha Cha	Jeremiah	
2021	The Phantom of the Open	Keith Mackenzie	
2021	Spider-Man: No Way Home	Dr. Curt Connors / Lizard	Voice, live-action appearance via archive footage
2021	The King's Man	Grigori Rasputin	
2023	Nyad	John Bartlett	
2023	Mother, Couch	Gruffudd	
2024	Venom: The Last Dance	Martin Moon	
2025	Inheritance	Sam	
2026	Onwards and Sideways	Tony Evans	Completed
2026	Star Wars: Gobaith Newydd	Obi-Wan Kenobi	Welsh dub of Star Wars: Episode IV – A New Hope
TBA	The Scurry †		Post-production

=== Television ===
Year	Title	Role	Notes
1991	Spatz	Dave	2 episodes
1995	Screen Two	Kevin	Episode: "Streetlife"
1997	Trial & Retribution	Michael Dunn	2 episodes
2000	Sali Mali	Narrator	2 series
2004	Not Only But Always	Peter Cook	TV movie
2008	A Number	Bernard (B2)	TV movie
2011	Neverland	James Hook	TV movie
2012	The Corrections	Gitanas	Unaired pilot
2013	Playhouse Presents	Chris	Episode: "Gifted"
2013–2014	Elementary	Mycroft Holmes	7 episodes
2016–2019	Berlin Station	Hector DeJean	24 episodes
2021	Temple	Gubby	Season 2
2022–2026	House of the Dragon	Otto Hightower	Main cast (seasons 1–2); Uncredited role (season 3); 13 episodes
2026	Star City	The Chief Designer	Lead role

=== Music videos ===
Year	Title	Role	Notes
1996	"God! Show Me Magic"	Announcer	
1997	"Mulder and Scully"		
2000	"Mama Told Me Not to Come"		
2005	"The Importance of Being Idle"	Lazy Man	

== Honours, awards and nominations ==
On 16 July 2007, he received an Honorary Fellowship of Bangor University, for services to the film industry.

Year	Awards	Category	Work	Result	ref
2000	53rd British Academy Film Awards	BAFTA Award for Best Actor in a Supporting Role	Notting Hill	Nominated	
2000	Satellite Awards	Best Supporting Actor – Motion Picture	Notting Hill	Nominated	
2000	Blockbuster Entertainment Awards	Favorite Supporting Actor - Comedy/Romance	Notting Hill	Nominated	
2005	2005 British Academy Television Awards	BAFTA Best Actor (TV)	Not Only But Always	Won	
2005	International Emmy Awards	International Emmy Award for Best Actor	Not Only But Always	Nominated	
2005	Empire Awards	Best British Actor	Enduring Love	Nominated	
2005	BAFTA Cymru	Sian Phillips Award	Outstanding Contribution to TV/Film	Won	
2010	Seville European Film Festival	Best Actor	Mr. Nice	Won	
2012	2012 Teen Choice Awards	Choice Movie Villain	The Amazing Spider-Man	Nominated	
2015	BAFTA Cymru	Best Actor (Yr Actor Gorau)	Under Milk Wood	Nominated	
2017	Tallinn Black Nights Film Festival	Jury Prize - Best Actor	Last Call (Dylan Thomas)	Won	
