= Maenclochog =

Village, parish and community in Pembrokeshire, Wales

- Location within Pembrokeshire
- Population: 731 (2011)
- OS grid reference: SN0834127337
- Principal area: Pembrokeshire
- Preserved county: Dyfed
- Country: Wales
- Sovereign state: United Kingdom
- Post town: MAENCLOCHOG
- Postcode district: SA66
- Dialling code: 01437
- Police: Dyfed-Powys
- Fire: Mid and West Wales
- Ambulance: Welsh
- UK Parliament: Preseli Pembrokeshire
- Senedd Cymru – Welsh Parliament: Ceredigion Penfro
- List of places UK Wales Pembrokeshire 51.911499°N 4.7879°W Map of the community

Maenclochog (Welsh pronunciation) is a village, parish and community in Pembrokeshire, south-west Wales. It is also the name of an electoral ward comprising a wider area of four surrounding communities. Maenclochog Community includes the small settlement of Llanycefn (Welsh pronunciation) and the village of Rosebush.

The Maenclochog community population was 731 in 2011.

Maenclochog lies south of the Preseli Mountains, about one mile southeast of Rosebush on the B4313 Narberth to Fishguard road.

== Origin of the name ==
The origin of the name Maenclochog is unclear. It appears to be made up of two Welsh words, maen ("stone") and clochog ("noisy, clamorous"). The 'bell-stones' - two stones said to ring like a bell when struck - were attested to as late as 1811 but the context is now unknown and they are now gone. A local tale reports that these were stones near Ffynnon Fair ("Mary's Well"), to the south of the village, which rang like bells when struck, but these were blown up by treasure-hunters, in the mistaken belief that they concealed a golden treasure. This may represent nothing more than folk etymology. An alternative proposal is that the second part of the name comes from the Irish word, clochog, meaning a craggy place. This theory is supported by the fact that there was Irish migration to Pembrokeshire in the early Middle Ages, as attested to by the 5th or 6th century Ogham stones found in the locality and elsewhere, and certainly the name suits the topography of the area.

== History ==
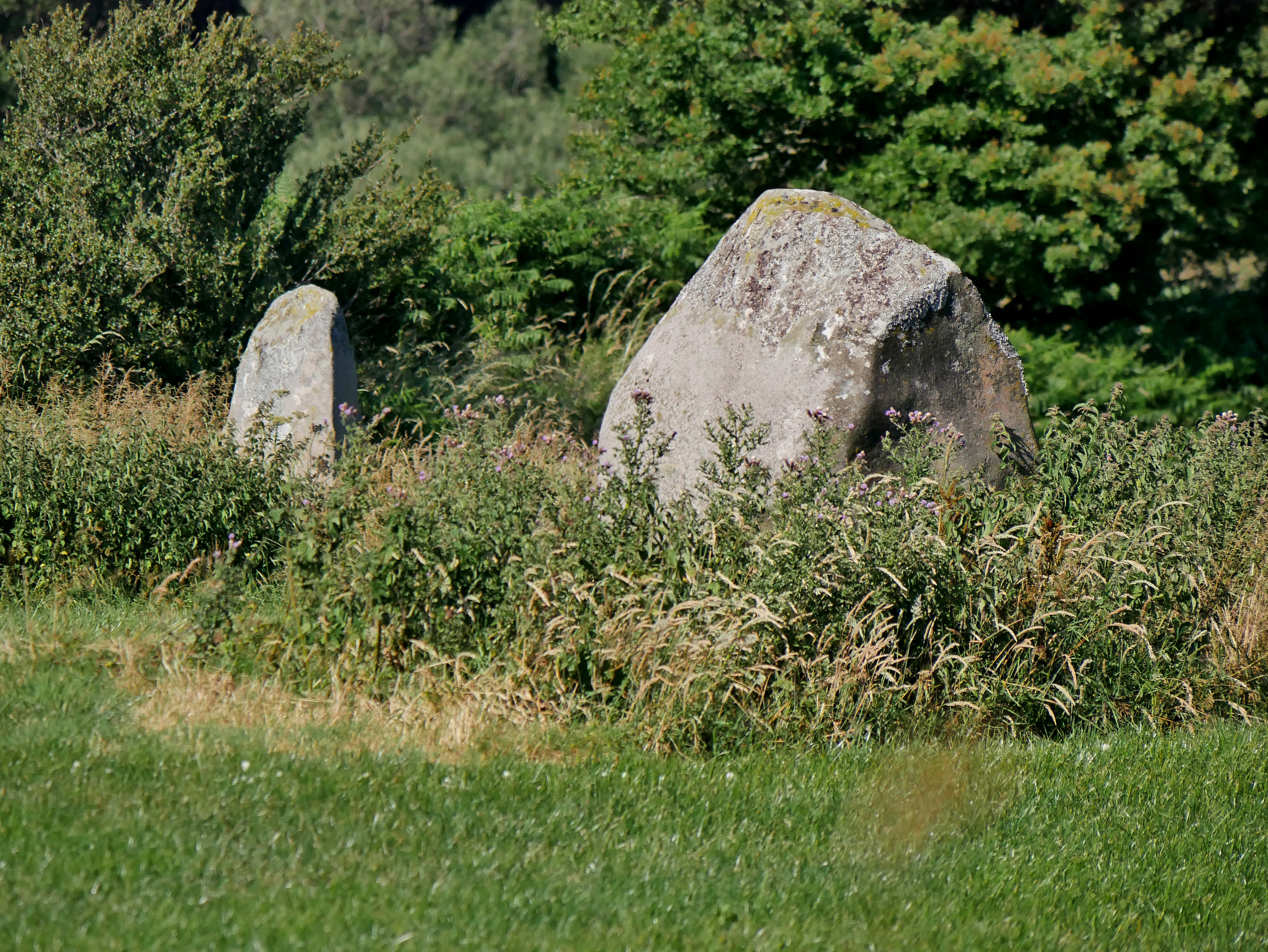
Maenclochog Standing Stones

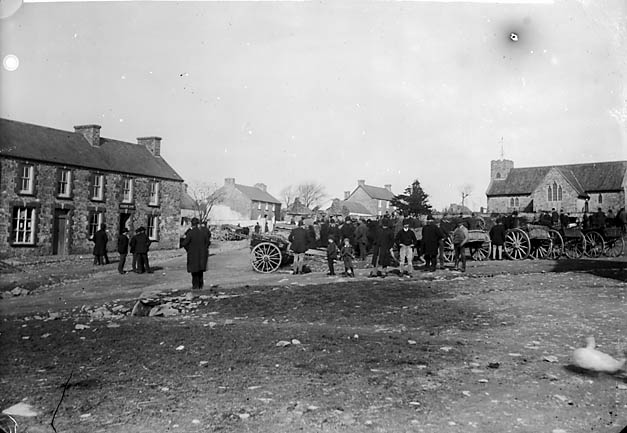
Maenclochog fair in 1893

There is evidence of prehistoric occupation in the vicinity of the present village.

Researchers have found what are believed to be the remains of a 13th-century castle at Maenclochog. Maenclochog (as Mancloghay) appears on a 1583 parish map of Pembrokeshire.

The village was served by the Maenclochog Railway, formally known as the Narberth Road and Maenclochog Railway, which ran from Clynderwyn on the Great Western Railway via Maenclochog to Rosebush. The tunnel just outside Maenclochog was used during World War 2 as a bomb-test site for Barnes Wallis, creator of the bouncing bomb.

Following the Second World War an attempt by the War Office to take over 16,000 acres of the Preselau slopes, as a permanent military training ground, was thwarted by a strong campaign led by local ministers of religion and headteachers. The acquisition would have meant a loss of farming livelihood, and Maenclochog might have become a garrison village.

== Community ==
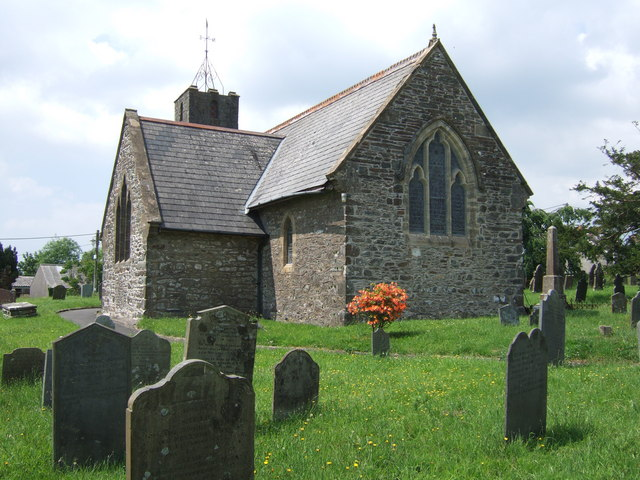
St Mary's Church and graveyard

The village has a local committee to discuss village affairs. There are two general stores and two petrol stations with a MOT service. In the centre of the village is St Mary's church (Welsh: Eglwys Fair), the park and the green on a small road island. In the village there are many businesses that include two electrical wholesalers and an art gallery. There is a school and a carpenter's situated about 50 metres northwest of the church. Opposite the green is a pub, The Globe.

== Education ==
Ysgol Gymunedol Maenclochog is a Welsh-medium primary school built in 1878; it has roughly 100 pupils ranging from age 3 to 11.

Between Maenclochog and Llanycefn is Nant-y-Cwm School, an independent, co-educational Steiner Waldorf school, taking pupils from ages 3 to 14. It was founded in 1979 in a converted Victorian building that was originally the village school for Llanycefn, a Board School that ran from 1877 to 1964. The original school records are available to view at the Pembrokeshire Records Office in Haverfordwest.

== Anglican Church ==
In the centre of the village green is the Anglican (Church in Wales) church of St Mary, of mediaeval origins but substantially restored in the 19th century. The architecture was fully described when the church was Grade II listed in 1971.
