= Letterston =

Village, parish and community in Pembrokeshire, Wales

Letterston: Welsh: Treletert
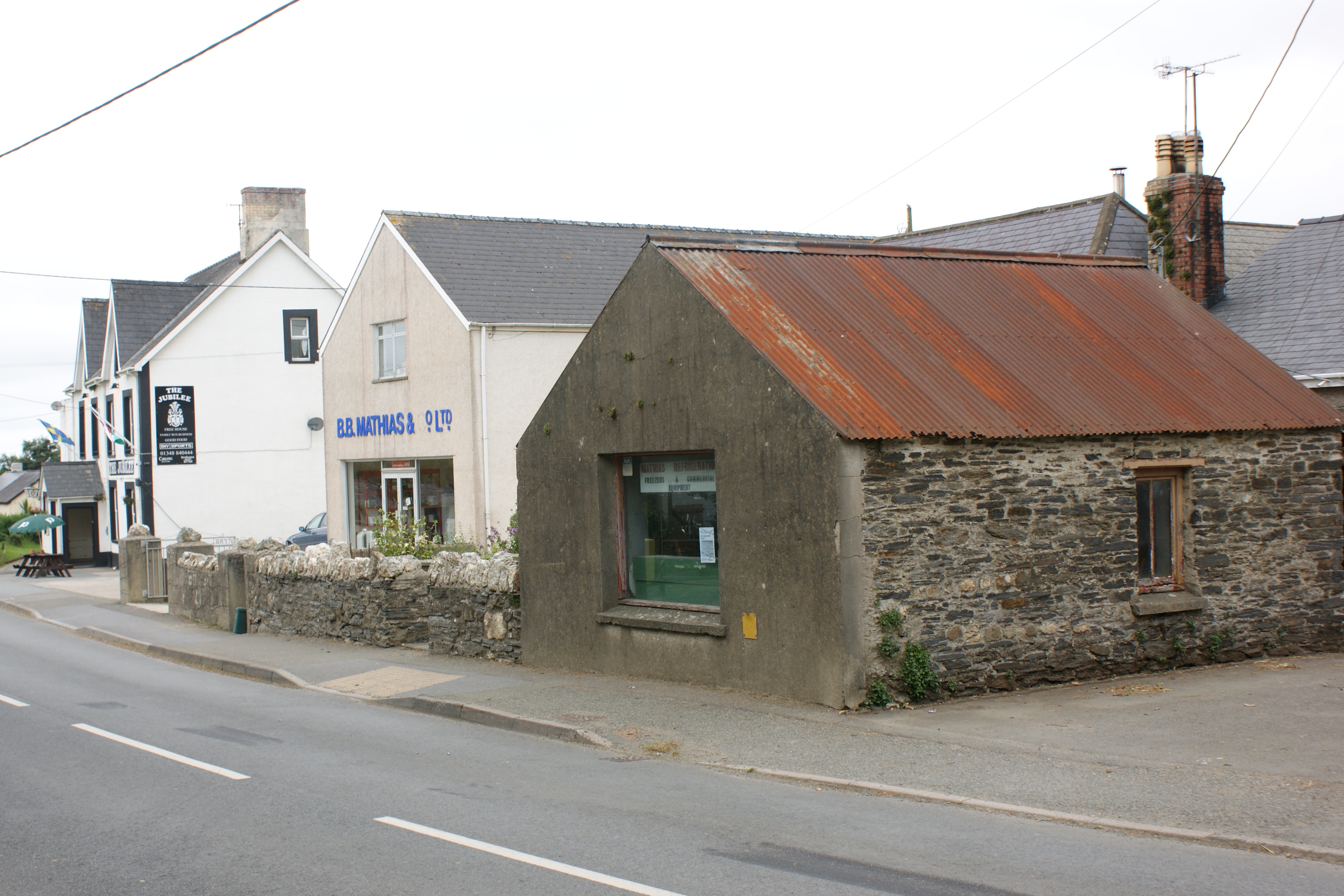
- In the village centre

- Location within Pembrokeshire
- Population: 1,245 (2011)
- OS grid reference: SM940297
- Principal area: Pembrokeshire
- Country: Wales
- Sovereign state: United Kingdom
- Post town: Haverfordwest
- Postcode district: SA62 5
- Dialling code: 01348
- Police: Dyfed-Powys
- Fire: Mid and West Wales
- Ambulance: Welsh
- UK Parliament: Mid and South Pembrokeshire
- Senedd Cymru – Welsh Parliament: Ceredigion Penfro
- List of places UK Wales Pembrokeshire 51.927°N 4.996°W Map of the community

Letterston (Welsh: Treletert) is a parish and local government community in north Pembrokeshire, Wales. Situated on the A40, Haverfordwest is 10 miles (16 km) to the south and Fishguard is 7 miles (11 km) to the north.

The name is derived from the medieval owners of the parish, the Lettard family.

== History ==
Twelve men of the parish died in World War 1 and six in World War 2; their names are commemorated on the War Memorial at the parish church of St Giles.

Just 3.7 kilometers from Letterston is the Church of St. Dogfael. On the west side of the church is the Hogtivis Stone, which features the Latin inscription, HOGTIVIS FILI DEMETI, which translates to, "Hogtivis, son of Demetus".

== Governance ==
An electoral ward in the same name exists. This ward stretches south west to Hayscastle. The total ward population taken at the 2011 Census was 2,352.

== Demographics ==
Letterston's population was 1,245, according to the 2011 census; a 24.75 per cent increase since the 998 people noted in 2001.

The 2011 census showed 42.1 per cent of the population could speak Welsh, a fall from 47.2 per cent in 2001.
