= Narberth Road and Maenclochog Railway =

Railway in Wales

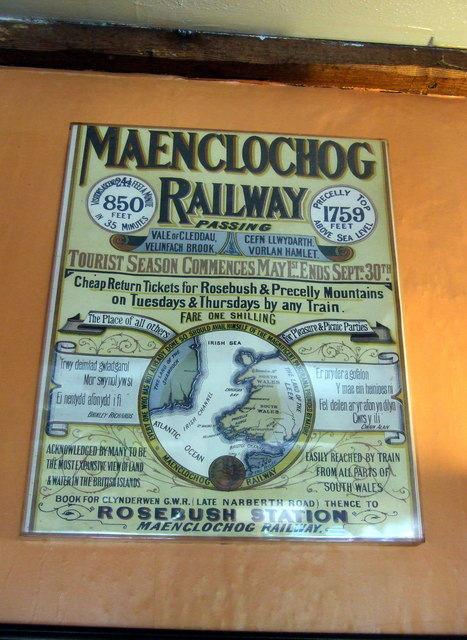
A poster advertising its Tourist tickets - one shilling on Tuesdays and Thursdays

The Narberth Road and Maenclochog Railway was a Welsh light railway company in Pembrokeshire. Services started in January 1876.

== Route ==
The 8.5-mile-long (13.7 km) line ran from Clynderwen (formerly Narberth Road) on the Great Western Railway via Maenclochog to Rosebush in the Preseli Mountains. Its terminus at Rosebush served large slate quarries.

== Takeover ==
The company was purchased by the North Pembrokeshire and Fishguard Railway in May 1894.
