= North Pembrokeshire and Fishguard Railway =

Welsh railway company

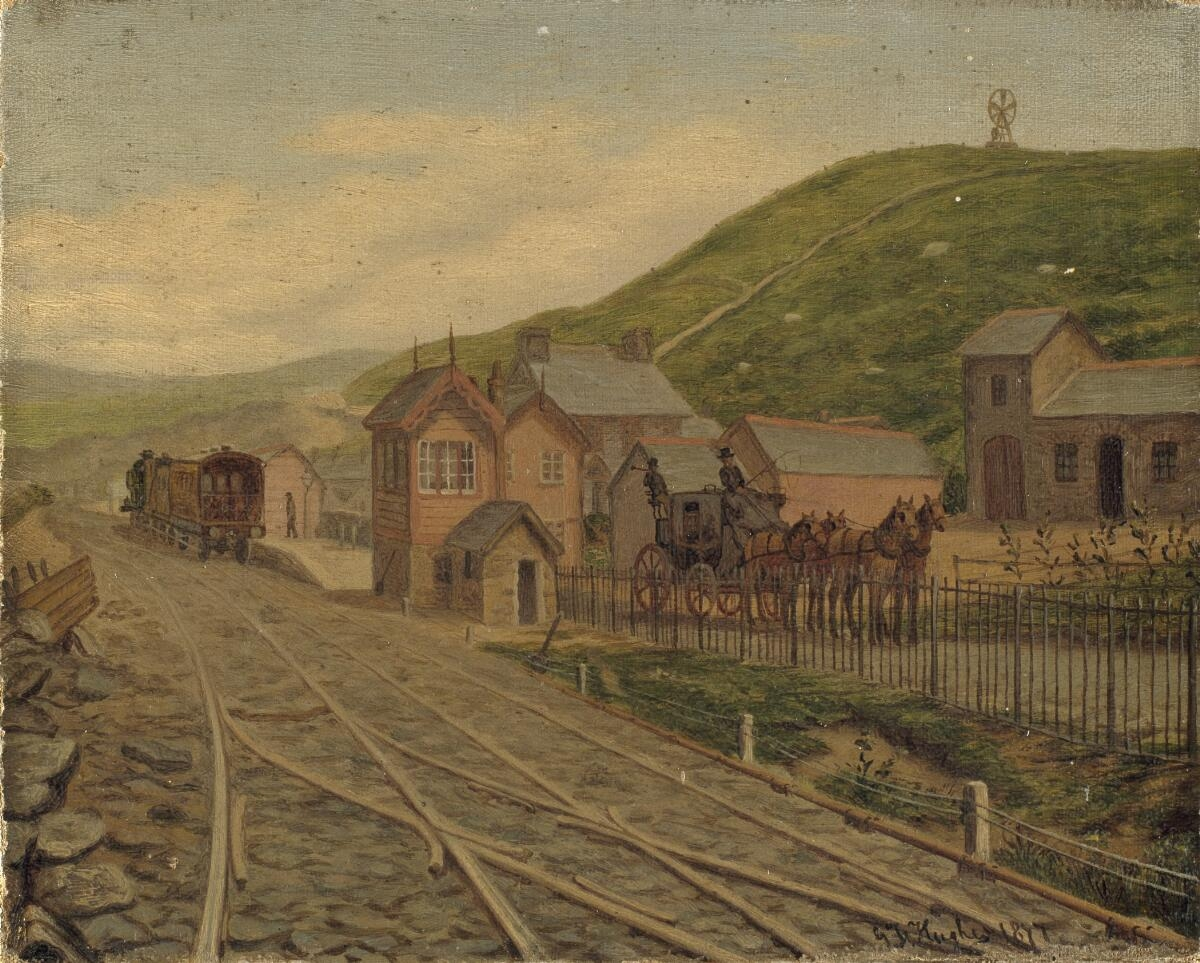
Rosebush railway station, Pembrokeshire in 1877

The North Pembrokeshire and Fishguard Railway was a railway company in south-west Wales, incorporated to extend the moribund Narberth Road and Maenclochog Railway, with a view to developing a port on Fishguard Bay and ferry services to Rosslare in Ireland.

The Narberth Road and Maenclochog Railway had been opened in 1876 to connect slate quarries at Rosebush with the main line of the Great Western Railway; it also carried passengers and general merchandise, and the line had an exceptionally steep gradient. The line was not profitable and closed in 1882.

The North Pembrokeshire and Fishguard Railway was promoted in 1884, planned to build from Rosebush to Goodwick, on Fishguard Bay. At this time the Great Western Railway operated a ferry service to Ireland from Neyland (New Milford) and the NP&FR boldly sought to challenge this with a shorter crossing to Rosslare. The proprietors were to improve the harbour at Rosslare as well, and planned to work collaboratively with the Narberth Road line.

The steep gradients and sharp curves on that line would have made the through route exceptionally difficult, but another company, the Fishguard and Rosslare Railway and Harbour Company was incorporated in 1893 and bought out the smaller lines, and extended to a station at Fishguard Harbour. In addition the F&RR&H took over a considerable extent of railway in Ireland based in Rosslare. The Great Western Railway built a better-aligned route to Fishguard, opened fully in 1906 when the ferry service transferred to Fishguard. The new line bypassed the Rosebush railways, which reverted to the status of local rural lines, and they declined and were closed in 1937.

== South Wales Railway ==
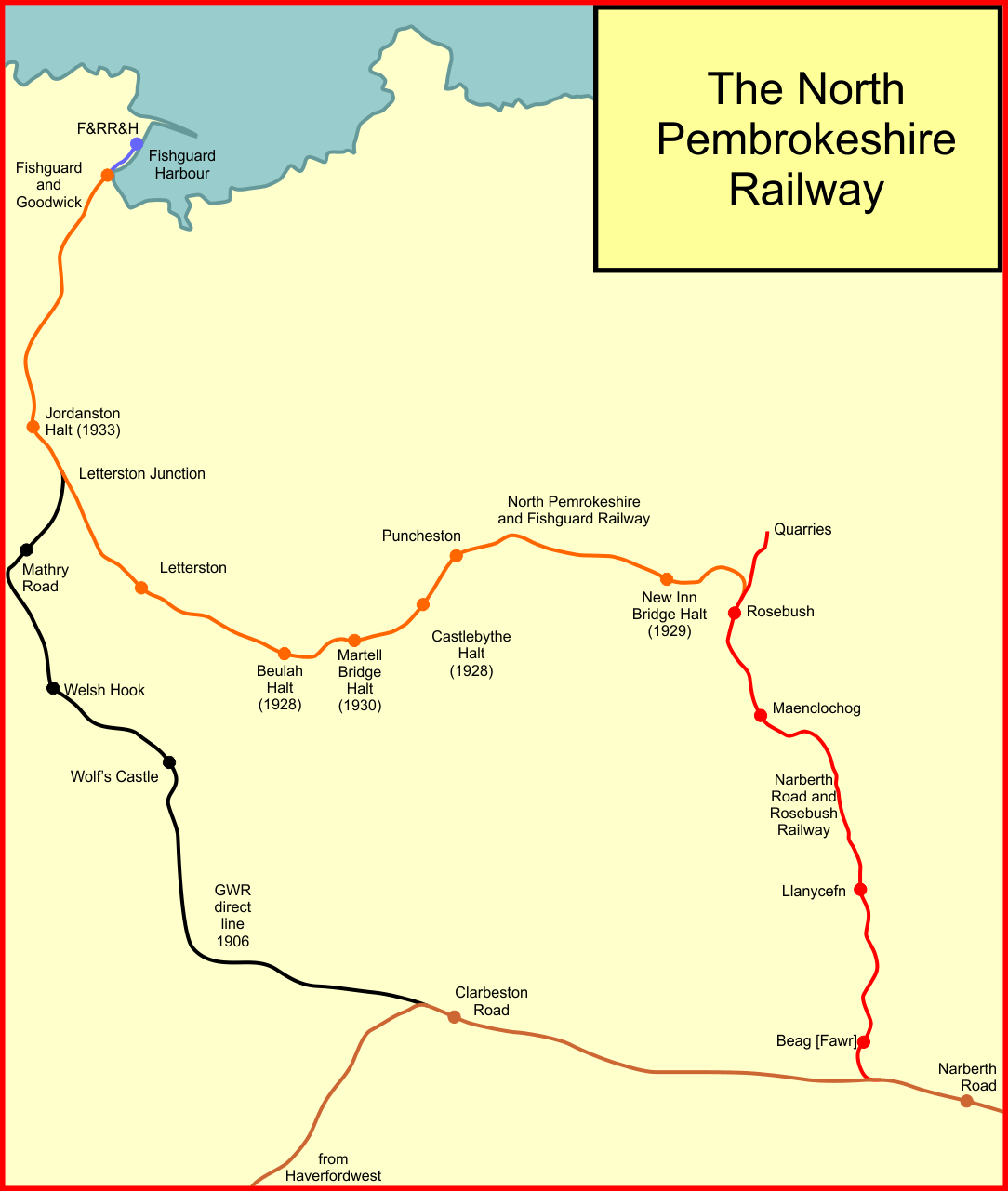
The Narberth Road and Rosebush Railway and the North Pembrokeshire and Fishguard Railway

The Great Western Railway (GWR) was completing its main line between London and Bristol, and in 1844 the company's engineer Isambard Kingdom Brunel was surveying a line that would connect the GWR Gloucester branch to Cardiff, Swansea and Fishguard. A prospectus was issued in the name of the South Wales Railway. The significance of Fishguard was that the GWR intended, with the collaboration of new railways in Ireland, to capture the contract for the official mail traffic between London and Dublin. (Note: At that time, Ireland was part of the United Kingdom and communication with Dublin was an essential part of governmental administration.) Hitherto this had been carried from Holyhead to Kingstown (now known as Dún Laoghaire), but the road transit to Holyhead was long and difficult. A ferry from Fishguard to "a new port south of Wexford" and efficient rail connections on both sides of the crossing could be competitive.

The South Wales Railway (SWR) was incorporated by the South Wales Railway Act 1845 (8 & 9 Vict. c. cxc) on 4 August 1845. It was always in effect a subsidiary of the Great Western Railway, and a perpetual lease by the GWR of the SWR in December 1846 was agreed to start from the completion to Fishguard. There were difficulties about the route at the Gloucester end of the South Wales Railway, and Brunel began to have misgivings about the suitability of Fishguard, which at the time had no sheltered harbour facilities. In 1845 there was widespread loss of the potato crop on which a majority of Irish people depended for a living, resulting in mass starvation and commercial depression, which deepened the following year. The catastrophe is known as the Great Famine. With unfortunate timing, the Waterford, Wexford, Wicklow and Dublin Railway secured its authorising act of Parliament, the Waterford, Wexford, Wicklow and Dublin Railway Act 1846 (9 & 10 Vict. c. ccviii) on 16 July 1846; capital £2 million.

Observing the deepening crisis in Ireland, the Waterford, Wexford, Wicklow and Dublin Railway Company cut back its plans and declared that it could not build to Wexford. For the time being a rail and ferry route to Dublin via Fishguard was impossible. Brunel had all along entertained thoughts of developing the transatlantic shipping trade from south-west Wales, and he declared this in 1844. Whereas the Irish ferry service was reliant on the shortest possible sea crossing, transatlantic shipping had different priorities. Linking with his doubts about the general suitability of Fishguard, he agreed with the board of the South Wales Railway that it would not now build to Fishguard. A branch of the planned Fishguard line was to run to Haverfordwest and the decision was taken to extend that line to a harbour on Milford Haven, where there was a deep anchorage. The railway's terminus was given that name, but later it was changed to Neyland, and another harbour and station nearby was named Milford Haven.

The lease of the SWR by the GWR had been interrupted by the decision not to build to Fishguard, but in March 1852 a new lease was agreed, and abandonment of the Clarbeston Road to Fishguard section was sanctioned by the South Wales Railway Act 1852 (15 & 16 Vict. c. cxvii). The South Wales Railway was publicly opened as far as Haverfordwest on 2 January 1854, and from there to Neyland on 15 April 1856. A twice weekly steamer service to Waterford, and other services were started gradually.

The terminus, "Milford Haven", was renamed Neyland in 1859 and then changed again to New Milford by December 1859.

== Narberth Road and Maenclochog Railway ==
For some years small-scale slate quarrying operations had been carried on at Rosebush, high in the Preseli Hills, and eight miles from the South Wales Railway main line at a station called Narberth Road, itself three miles from Narberth. That station was later named Clynderwen, and later again Clunderwen. In 1869 a wealthy financier named Edward Cropper purchased the freehold; Cropper was also a director of the London and North Western Railway. Joseph Babington Macaulay, Cropper's stepson, operated the quarry, and in order to facilitate transport of the heavy mineral to the main line railway, he planned to build a railway connection.

Cropper and Macaulay applied in July 1871 for a Board of Trade certificate under the Railways Construction Facilities Act 1864 (27 & 28 Vict. c. 121); this was a low-cost means of getting a line authorised where landowners were agreeable to the construction and there was no other infringement of the public interest. Captain Tyler of the Board of Trade visited the site in October 1871; the line was to be standard gauge as by then it was known that the GWR would shortly be converting the gauge of the South Wales Railway from broad gauge to standard. The certificate was issued on 24 June 1872. The cost of construction was stated to be £42,247, a considerable sum then.

Passenger operation was contemplated at the planning stage: a clause in the authorisation required Cropper to arrange for one train daily to call at a station at Llanycefn whose location was to be agreed with the Ecclesiastical Commissioners. There was an agreement with the Great Western Railway that that company would lay a third track for about a mile alongside its main line to allow Cropper's trains to reach Narberth Road station. When completed, the line had one of the steepest gradients on a standard gauge line in England, with gradient of 1 in 27 for about 1.9 miles (see List of steepest gradients on adhesion railways).

A trial run by the contractors in September 1875 reputedly allowed passengers travelling to the annual hiring fair at Maenclochog, while slate traffic appears to have started from January 1876. Colonel C S Hutchinson inspected the line on 3 May 1876 on behalf of the Board of Trade for public opening, but he was dissatisfied with the intended arrangement at Narberth Road for branch trains and he declined to give approval. Different arrangements were put in hand and when Hutchinson reinspected in September, he approved the opening. The line - now trading simply as Maenclochog Railway - opened for passenger traffic on 19 September 1876 with four passenger trains each way daily, with stations at Llanycefn, Maenclochog and Rosebush - and apparently (but later) a "fare stop" (Note: Probably a regular stopping place but without any physical facilities.) at Beag. The line was worked on the "one engine in steam" principle.

Even on opening day, there was ambitious talk of extending the line from Rosebush to Fishguard, and instituting a harbour there in opposition to the GWR. Cropper was hostile to the GWR, and the high charge imposed by the GWR for the company's use of Narberth Road station was a sore point. The slate from Rosebush was not as good quality as North Wales slate, so the slate trade was not as positive as had been hoped and, after a period of decline, the line was closed from 1 January 1883.

The line was reopened on 15 December 1884, with two passenger trains daily, and some carryings of slate. But it was no more successful than previously, being closed from 31 March 1885 but reopened on 21 March 1887, only to close yet again "on and from" (Saturday) 25 June 1887 (which probably means with effect from Monday 27 June). The company owning the railway and the quarry was to have been offered for sale by auction on 20 February 1889, but this was postponed and never took place, but the railway was eventually purchased by the North Pembrokeshire & Fishguard company in 1894 for £50,000.

== Rosebush and Fishguard Railway ==
Rosebush and Fishguard Railway Act 1878
- Act of Parliament
- Parliament of the United Kingdom
- Long title: An Act for authorising the construction of a Railway from the Narberth Road and Maenclochog Railway at Rosebush to Fishguard; and for other purposes.
- Citation: 41 & 42 Vict. c. ccxviii

Dates
- Royal assent: 8 August 1878

Text of statute as originally enacted

Reaching Fishguard had long been an aspiration, and the Rosebush and Fishguard Railway was authorised by the Rosebush and Fishguard Railway Act 1878 (41 & 42 Vict. c. ccxviii) of 8 August 1878. The line was to be nearly 14 miles in length, running from Rosebush, on the Narberth Road and Rosebush Railway line, through Puncheston and Letterston to Goodwick, on Fishguard Bay. There were running powers over the Narberth line; authorised capital was £90,000.

Rosebush and Fishguard Railway Act 1881
- Act of Parliament
- Parliament of the United Kingdom
- Long title: An Act to authorise a deviation of part of the Rosebush and Fishguard Railway; to extend the time for the compulsory purchase of Lands for and for the completion of other part of that Railway; to authorise the sale or lease of the Narberth Road and Maenclochog Railway to the Rosebush and Fishguard Railway Company; to enable the last mentioned Company to raise further Money; and for other purposes.
- Citation: 44 & 45 Vict. c. cxcvi

Dates
- Royal assent: 11 August 1881

Text of statute as originally enacted

A contract for construction was soon let, but the lack of available money delayed actual progress and in 1881 the Rosebush and Fishguard Railway Act 1881 (44 & 45 Vict. c. cxcvi) had to be obtained authorising an extension of time. At the same time agreement was reached with the Narberth Road and Maenclochog Railway to operate the two lines (when complete) as a single entity. Even this new time extension proved not to be fruitful and the work was stopped, with a mile of formation made.

== North Pembrokeshire and Fishguard Railway ==
North Pembrokeshire and Fishguard Railway Act 1884
- Act of Parliament
- Parliament of the United Kingdom
- Long title: An Act to revive the powers and extend the time for the compulsory Purchase of Lands for and to extend the time for the completion of parts of the Railways of the Rosebush and Fishguard Railway Company to enable that Company to raise additional Capital to change the name of the Company and for other purposes.
- Citation: 47 & 48 Vict. c. ccxxxvi

Dates
- Royal assent: 7 August 1884

Text of statute as originally enacted

In 1883 abandonment of the whole scheme was considered, but in the following year a new act was obtained on 7 August 1884, the North Pembrokeshire and Fishguard Railway Act 1884 (47 & 48 Vict. c. ccxxxvi), allowing a further extension of time, and changing the name of the project to the North Pembrokeshire and Fishguard Railway. (Note: Awdry refers to the company as the North Pembroke and Fishguard Railway but that is a mistake.) Relations with the Narberth Road and Maenclochog Railway had been collaborative early on, but had progressively deteriorated and now Cropper refused for a time to permit plant and wagons to access the Rosebush works over his railway; the NP&FR had to insist on exercising their running powers, laid down by Parliament in the act.

North Pembrokeshire and Fishguard Railway Act 1886
- Act of Parliament
- Parliament of the United Kingdom
- Long title: An Act to revive the powers for the construction of a portion of the Railway authorised by the Rosebush and Fishguard Railway Act 1878 to authorise the North Pembrokeshire and Fishguard Railway Company to construct a deviation Railway and for other purposes.
- Citation: 50 Vict. c. liii

Dates
- Royal assent: 25 September 1886
Other legislation
Relates to	Rosebush and Fishguard Railway Act 1878

Text of statute as originally enacted

As before, little progress was made and a further extension of time was authorised by Parliament via the North Pembrokeshire and Fishguard Railway Act 1886 (50 Vict. c. liii). Towards the end of 1891 Colonel Joseph Okell undertook to complete the line and provide the necessary finance, and by March 1893 the works had reached Puncheston, but in January 1894 Okell was declared bankrupt, and that was the end of any financial assistance from him.

== Fishguard Bay Railway and Pier Company ==
Fishguard Bay Railway and Pier Act 1893
- Act of Parliament
- Parliament of the United Kingdom
- Long title: An Act for authorising the construction of a Railway with a Pier and Breakwater in connexion therewith at Fishguard Bay in the county of Pembroke and for other purposes.
- Citation: 56 & 57 Vict. c. xcvii

Dates
- Royal assent: 29 June 1893

Text of statute as originally enacted

Now two more men of means came on the scene: Joseph Rowlands, a solicitor from Birmingham, and James Carland, a brass-founder. They acquired a majority shareholding in the North Pembrokeshire and Fishguard Railway, and their objective became clear when they floated a new company, the Fishguard Bay Railway and Pier Company. This was incorporated, by the Fishguard Bay Railway and Pier Act 1893 (56 & 57 Vict. c. xcvii), of 29 June 1893, to construct a railway a little less than a mile in length from Goodwick, where the North Pembrokeshire was to terminate, and to run to the west side of Fishguard Bay. (Note: The small town of Fishguard is at the east end of Fishguard Bay, and Goodwick is at the west end. When discussing reaching Fishguard, the reference has been to the Bay; so the North Pembrokeshire and Fishguard Railway considered Goodwick, on Fishguard Bay, to be its destination. The new company was to extend northwards alongside the bay, to the present-day Fishguard Harbour station.) A pier or breakwater was to be constructed as well as a hotel, and running powers over the North Pembrokeshire line were granted. The company's capital was to be £120,000. The partners also undertook to improve the harbour at Rosslare. This was at first done through the medium of the Rosslare Harbours and Railways Company.

== Fishguard and Rosslare Railways and Harbours Company ==
Fishguard and Rosslare Railways and Harbours Act 1894
- Act of Parliament
- Parliament of the United Kingdom
- Long title: An Act to vest the undertakings of the Waterford and Wexford Railway Company and of the Rosslare Harbour Commissioners in the Fishguard and Rosslare Railways and Harbours Company to authorise that Company to raise additional Capital to change their name and for other purposes.
- Citation: 57 & 58 Vict. c. cxxxvii

Dates
- Royal assent: 31 July 1894

Text of statute as originally enacted

The Fishguard and Rosslare Railways and Harbours Company's railways in Ireland in 1924

The Waterford and Wexford Railway was engaged in improving the harbour facilities at Rosslare, and negotiations took place to combine the activities on both sides of the ferry crossing. This culminated in the incorporation of the Fishguard and Rosslare Railways and Harbours Company by the Fishguard and Rosslare Railways and Harbours Act 1894 (57 & 58 Vict. c. cxxxvii) of 31 July 1894.

Shortly before this took place Rowlands and Cartland negotiated to purchase the derelict Maenclochog Railway in 1894 for £50,000. The Maenclochog line was by now in a very poor state of repair, and much had to be done in the way of improvements. Colonel Yorke of the Board of Trade made an inspection of the Rosebush to Fishguard [Bay] line on 12 March 1895, and also inspected the upgraded Maenclochog line. He required a number of detail matters to be improved, but – after a ceremonial opening on 14 March 1895 – goods traffic (not requiring Board of Trade approval) started on 18 March 1895 and passenger trains on 11 April 1895; Yorke made a confirmatory visit in July.

There were five up and four down passenger trains daily to and from Letterston, with a coach connection from Fishguard.

North Pembrokeshire and Fishguard Railway Act 1895
- Act of Parliament
- Parliament of the United Kingdom
- Long title: An Act to extend the time for the completion of the North Pembrokeshire and Fishguard Railway and to authorise the construction of new Railways in the Counties of Pembroke and Carmarthen and for other purposes.
- Citation: 58 & 59 Vict. c. cxxi

Dates
- Royal assent: 6 July 1895

Text of statute as originally enacted

The NP&FR submitted a bold proposal to Parliament in 1895 for an extension of their line to Carmarthen, and overtures were made to the London and North Western Railway as to their possible acquisition of the whole line, but the LNWR were cool on the matter. Nonetheless, the powers for the extension, and also a deviation to avoid the worst of the gradient on the Maenclochog line, were obtained in the North Pembrokeshire and Fishguard Railway Act 1895 (58 & 59 Vict. c. cxxi). A contract for the authorised extension line from Letterston to Fishguard was also awarded at this time.

In 1896 the FBR&P submitted even more ambitious schemes to Parliament, to reach Aberdare and make junctions with the LNWR, the Midland Railway and the GWR en route.

In 1897 the Fishguard and Rosslare Railways and Harbours Company was in Parliament consolidating its planned operation of ferries, harbours on both sides of the crossing, hotels and ancillary works. However dramatic events unfolded as the Fishguard and Rosslare Railways and Harbours Company suddenly indicated an unwillingness to proceed, and part of the fallout was that the Fishguard Bay Railway and Pier Company withdrew the Aberdare extension scheme.

The Fishguard and Rosslare Railways and Harbours Company became a joint enterprise of the Great Western Railway and the Great Southern and Western Railway.

== An improved through line ==
Fishguard and Rosslare Railways and Harbours Act 1898
- Act of Parliament
- Parliament of the United Kingdom
- Long title: An Act to authorise the construction by the Fishguard and Rosslare Railways and Harbours Company of new railways from Cork to Fermoy and Waterford to Rosslare and the acquisition by the Company of the undertakings of the Fermoy and Lismore and the Waterford Dungarvan and Lismore Railway Companies to confer running powers over certain railways to extend the time for completion of works authorised by the Fishguard Bay Railway and Pier Act 1893 and for other purposes.
- Citation: 61 & 62 Vict. c. cclii

Dates
- Royal assent: 12 August 1898

Text of statute as originally enacted

In February 1898 the situation regarding the F&RR&H clarified, when Alexander Henderson of the City of London purchased the entire F&RR&H undertaking, including the railway at Fishguard. He also purchased the NP&FR for £157,500. By 12 August 1898 the Fishguard and Rosslare Railways and Harbours Act 1898 (61 & 62 Vict. c. cclii) was passed, requiring the GWR to operate an efficient steamer service between Fishguard and Rosslare, and to provide a service of passenger and goods trains to Fishguard. The GWR took over the NP&FR (by agreement of 12 February 1898), but it was recognised that the little line with its sharp curves and very steep gradients was unsuitable as a through line. The GWR acknowledged the necessity of building a new direct line between Clarbeston Road and Letterston, also authorised by Parliament in 1898. Revival of the idea of generating transatlantic traffic from Fishguard was confirmed at the same time.

The line was completed, by the Great Western Railway, between Letterston and Fishguard & Goodwick station on 1 July 1899.

The civil engineering work at Fishguard and at Goodwick was on a considerable scale, much blasting and rock excavation being needed for the harbour and by the GWR on shore to create space for railway facilities. Much of the alignment of the new direct line was to follow Brunel's original Fishguard route, but a start was delayed and certain deviations were authorised by the Great Western Railway (New Works) Act 1903. The new line merged into the NP&FR line at Letterston Junction.

The new line was opened on 30 August 1906.

== Stations and closures ==
The passenger stations on the line were:

Narberth Road and Rosebush section:

- Narberth Road; main line station; renamed Clynderwen 1875; renamed Clunderwen 1980;
- Beag Fair Siding (Fawr); opened 11 April 1878; closed 1 January 1883;
- Llan-y-cefn; opened 19 September 1876; closed 1 January 1883; reopened 11 April 1895; closed 8 January 1917; reopened 12 July 1920;
- Maenclochog; opened 19 September 1876; closed 1 January 1883; reopened 5 December 1884; closed 31 March 1885; reopened 21 March 1887; closed 25 May 1887; reopened 11 April 1895; closed 8 January 1917; reopened 12 July 1920;
- Rosebush; opened 19 September 1876; closed 1 January 1883; reopened 5 December 1884; closed 31 March 1885; reopened 21 March 1887; closed 25 May 1887; reopened 11 April 1895; closed 8 January 1917; reopened 12 July 1920.

The line was closed on 25 October 1937.

North Pembrokeshire and Fishguard section:

- Rosebush; above;
- New Inn Bridge Halt; opened 14 October 1929;
- Puncheston; opened 11 April 1895; closed 8 January 1917; reopened 14 November 1921;
- Castlebythe Halt; opened 24 September 1928;
- Martell Bridge Halt; opened 1 January 1930;
- Beulah Halt; opened 24 September 1928;
- Letterston; opened 11 April 1895;
- Trecwn Branch Junction; 1938 to 1965;
- Letterston Junction; convergence with 1906 main line; until 2002;
- Goodwick.

The line closed between Rosebush and Letterston goods depot on 25 October 1937.

There were three trains a day on the Rosebush line in 1910, but the line was closed on 8 January 1917, and only reopened in stages after the end of World War I. Through services did not resume until 9 July 1923. The four halts on the line were opened between 1928 and 1930 in an effort to boost traffic.

It was first intended to close the line from September 1937, but the closure was deferred until 25 October 1937.

In 1938 Royal Navy Armaments Depot, Trecwn was established. It was located a few miles north of Letterston, and it was served by a new railway branch off the North Pembrokeshire and Fishguard line, between Letterston and Letterston Junction. The new branch line was 2.5 miles long. In addition, there was an extensive narrow gauge railway system in the depot. After World War II the depot continued to have strategic importance during the Cold War but it was decommissioned in 2002 and the railway branch has closed.

A modified version of the so-called bouncing bomb was developed after the famous Dam Busters raid (Operation Chastise) for land use. The bomb was intended to be projected into a railway tunnel and explode there blocking the tunnel. Tests were carried out at the Maenclochog Tunnel on 7 October 1943, with the inventor Barnes Wallis in attendance."Why RAF bombed Welsh rail tunnel". Wales Online. 29 September 2003.

Evidently the testing was not decisive, for the line was reopened after repairs later in World War II between Puncheston and Clynderwen and closed finally on 16 May 1949.

The stub from Letterston Junction survived as the RNAD branch to Trecwn; this continued to operate after closure of the NP&F line between Trecwn Branch Junction (controlled by Letterson Junction signal box) and Letterston which had closed 1 March 1965.

== See also ==
- The Great Western Railway in West Wales
