= Jordanston Halt railway station =

Former railway station in Wales

Jordanston Halt
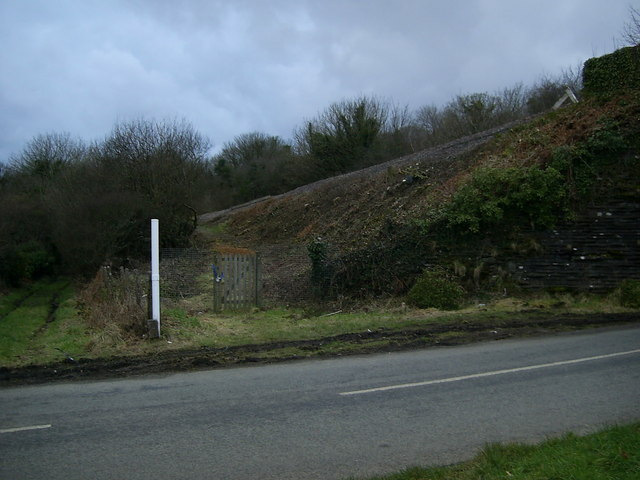
- Remaining access path to the former halt

General information
- Location: Jordanston, Pembrokeshire; Wales
- Coordinates: 51.9573°N 5.0133°W
- Grid reference: SM930330
- Platforms: 2

Other information
- Status: Disused

History
- Original company: Great Western Railway
- Post-grouping: Great Western Railway

Key dates
- 1 October 1923: Station opened
- 6 April 1964: Station closed
Location

Jordanston Halt railway station was an intermediate stop on the Great Western Railway's line to Fishguard Harbour. It served the hamlet of Jordanston, Pembrokeshire, Wales between 1923 and 1964.

== History ==
The railway line between Letterston and Goodwick (the latter station being renamed Fishguard and Goodwick in 1904) opened on 1 July 1899 as an extension of the line from Clynderwen via Rosebush, but initially there were no intermediate stations. No intermediate stations were provided either when the Clarbeston Road and Letterston Railway connected into the existing line at Letterston Junction in 1906.

Jordanston Halt, situated between Letterston Junction and Fishguard & Goodwick 284 miles 8 chains (457.2 km) from Paddington (measured via Rosebush), opened on 1 October 1923. The halt was close to the top of a 1 in 100 gradient sloping down towards Letterston Junction. Initially there were two platforms, but the double line north of Letterston Junction was singled on 9 March 1958 and the former up platform then served both directions. The facilities were basic: the platform surface was of cinders no higher than the rails - portable steps were used to board trains; and there was a small wooden shelter.

The station was served by trains on two routes. In July 1929, on the older route between Clynderwen and Fishguard and Goodwick via Rosebush there were two trains a day towards Clynderwen, and three towards Fishguard and Goodwick (one of which continued to Fishguard Harbour); all of these called at Jordanston Halt. In July 1949, on the newer line via Clarbeston Road, there were seven trains towards Fishguard Harbour, and eight to Clarbeston Road; the first train of the day in each direction ran to or from Neyland. On Sundays there was one train to Fishguard Harbour and one to Clarbeston Road.

Along with four other stations in Pembrokeshire, Jordanston Halt closed on 6 April 1964.

Preceding station	Historical railways	Following station
Mathry Road Halt; Line open, station closed	Great Western Railway; Clarbeston Road and Letterston Railway	Fishguard and Goodwick; Line and station open
	Disused railways	
Letterston; Line and station closed	Great Western Railway; North Pembrokeshire and Fishguard Railway	Fishguard and Goodwick; Line and station open
