= Wolf's Castle Halt railway station =

Former railway station in Wales

Wolf's Castle Halt
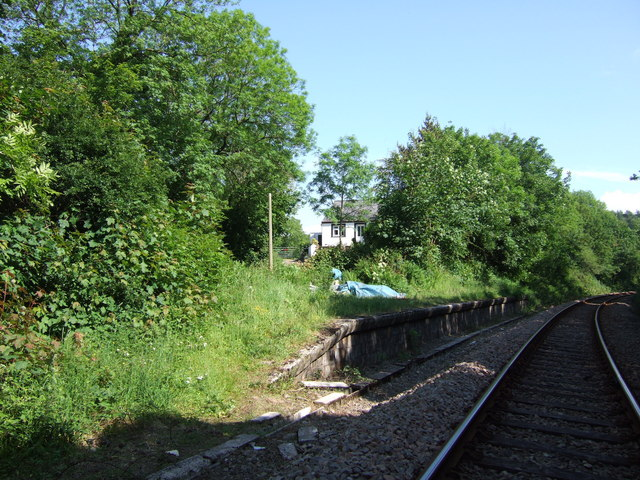
- Platform remains in 2007.

General information
- Location: Wolf's Castle, Pembrokeshire; Wales
- Coordinates: 51.8973°N 4.9686°W
- Grid reference: SM958262
- Platforms: 2

Other information
- Status: Disused

History
- Original company: Great Western Railway
- Pre-grouping: Great Western Railway
- Post-grouping: Great Western Railway

Key dates
- 1 October 1913: Station opened
- 6 April 1964: Station closed
Location

Wolf's Castle Halt railway station was on the Clarbeston Road and Letterston line of the Great Western Railway. It served the villages of Wolf's Castle and Ford between 1913 and 1964.

== History ==
The Clarbeston Road and Letterston Railway, s subsidiary of the Great Western Railway (GWR), was opened on 30 August 1906, but at first there were no intermediate stations. However, there was a signal box at Wolf's Castle, because although most of the route was built as double track, a portion near the middle, which included Spittal Tunnel and the cutting through Treffgarne Gorge, was single-track, and it was necessary to have signal boxes at each end of the single-track section. The single-track section was later doubled, but although the temporary signal boxes at Spittal and Treffgarne closed with the introduction of full double-track working on 17 December 1906, Wolf's Castle signal box was retained to break the section, allowing two trains to proceed in the same direction between Clarbeston Road and Letterston simultaneously; there was also a crossover.

The first of three intermediate stations to open on the line was Wolf's Castle Halt on 1 October 1913. It was situated 251 miles 55 chains (405.1 km) from Paddington (via the Severn Tunnel), and was on a level stretch of line to the east of the signal box. The stations to either side in 1923 were Clarbeston Road and Fishguard and Goodwick. Unusually for a GWR halt, the two platforms were built of brick rather than wood, as were the shelters. The up platform was 115 feet (35 m) long, and the down platform was 155 ft (47 m) long. The station nameboards stated "Wolf's Castle Halt for Treffgarne Rocks". The service was operated using GWR steam rail motors running between Fishguard Harbour and Neyland; there were three trains a day in each direction.

The crossover was removed in 1924, and the signal box was taken out of use on 17 February 1925; it was transferred to Mathry Road.

The station closed on 6 April 1964, as did all the other stations between Clarbeston Road and Fishguard Harbour.

In 2011, the waiting shelters on the platforms no longer exist and the line has been reduced to a single track positioned about halfway between the platforms, which would prevent any future use. The track is also raised on an embankment of ballast, so even if it was still alongside the platform the train doors would be some distance above the platform height.

== Notes ==
Preceding station	Historical railways	Following station
Clarbeston Road; Line and station open	Great Western Railway; Clarbeston Road and Letterston Railway	Welsh Hook Halt; Line open, station closed
