= West Wales lines =

Railway lines west of Swansea, Wales

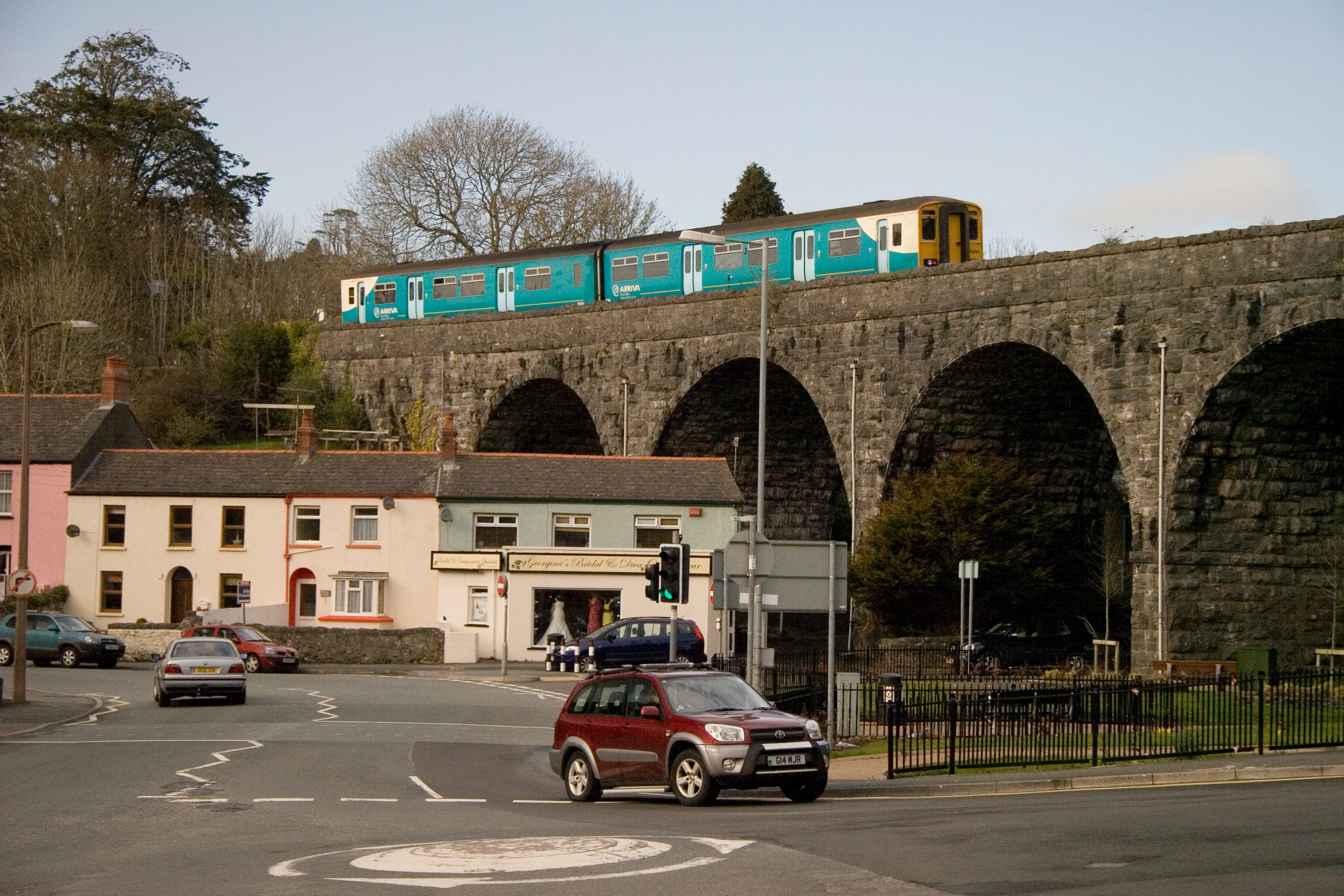
- A Class 150 unit crosses the viaduct near Tenby

Overview
- Owner: Network Rail
- Locale: Swansea, Carmarthenshire, Pembrokeshire

Service
- Type: Heavy Rail
- System: National Rail

History
- Opened: 1868

Technical
- Number of tracks: Double track: Swansea to Clarbeston Road; Single track: Remainder
- Track gauge: 4 ft 8 1/2 in (1,435 mm) standard gauge
Route map
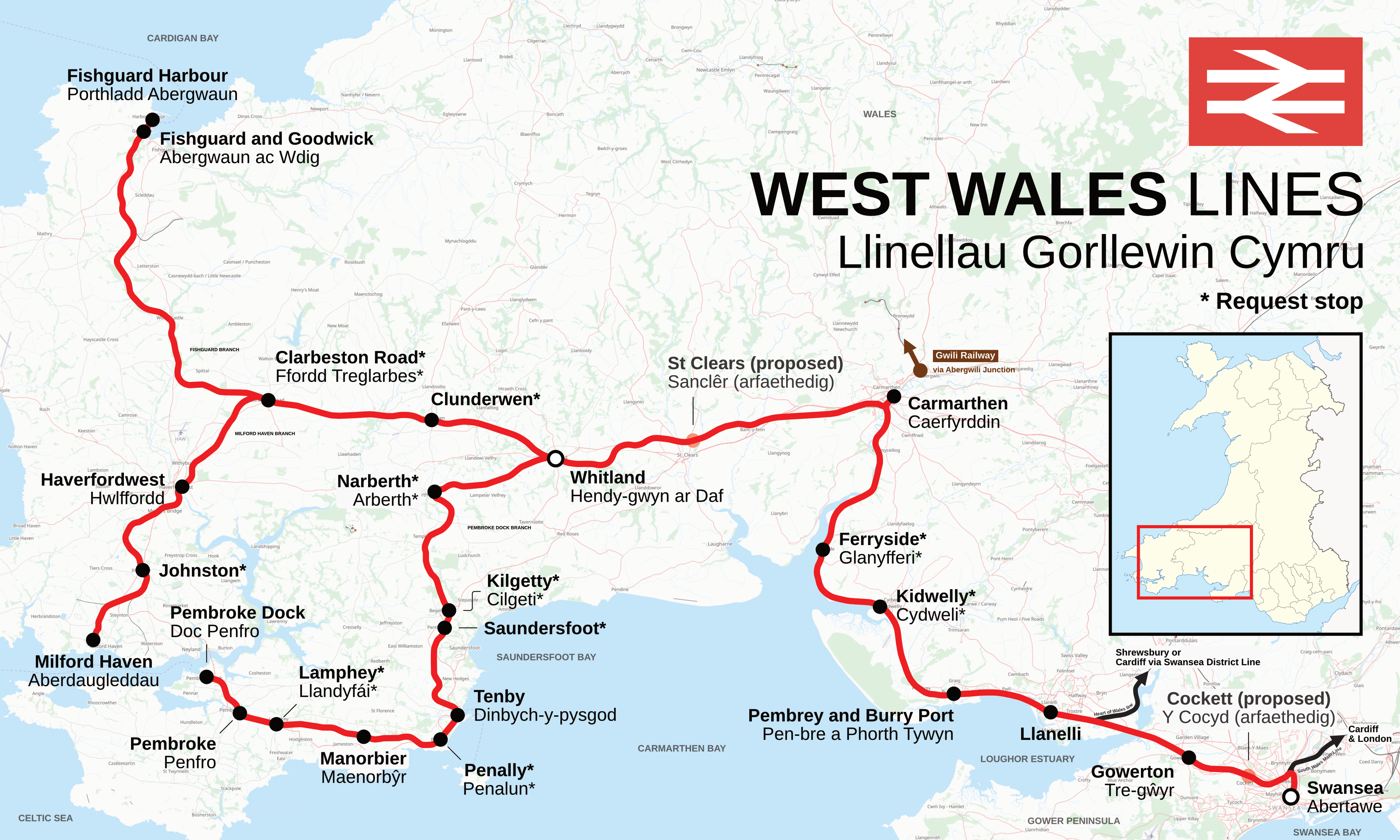

The West Wales lines (Welsh: Llinellau Gorllewin Cymru) are a group of railway lines from Swansea through Carmarthenshire to Pembrokeshire, in West Wales. The main part runs from Swansea to Carmarthen and Whitland, where it splits into three branches to Fishguard, Milford Haven and Pembroke Dock.

Before the railway network cuts of the 1960s, there were routes to Cardigan, Newcastle Emlyn, Llandysul and cross-country from Carmarthen to Aberystwyth, via Lampeter.

== History ==
The railway to west Wales was first projected in 1844, and the proposal was for a line to run from the Great Western Railway near Gloucester to Fishguard, with a branch from Whitland to Pembroke. The railway was called the South Wales Railway, and although it was in theory independent of the GWR, in practice it was very closely linked. This was shown by the fact that Isambard Kingdom Brunel was the engineer, and the line was laid to the 7 ft (2,134 mm) broad gauge.

Construction began in 1847, but the company ran into financial difficulties. In addition, the Great Famine of Ireland reduced the prospective revenue from Anglo-Irish traffic. As a result, instead of completing the line to the proposed port at Fishguard, the Haverfordwest branch was extended to Neyland where the harbour would cost less.

The line from Swansea opened as far as Carmarthen on 11 October 1852, to Haverfordwest on 2 January 1854, and to its terminus at Neyland on 15 April 1856. At first, the railway was leased to the GWR but, in 1863, the two companies were amalgamated.

The original powers for the branch to Pembroke lapsed, and so, in 1859, the Pembroke and Tenby Railway was authorised to build a 4 ft 8 1/2 in (1,435 mm), standard gauge line from Pembroke Dock to Tenby. The line opened from Tenby to Pembroke on 30 July 1863 and to Pembroke Dock on 8 August 1864. The extension from Tenby to the GWR line at Whitland opened on 4 September 1866. There were two adjoining stations at Whitland with no physical connection between the two lines because they operated on different gauges.

The line was engineered by Sir James Szlumper. It had its own police force until 1897, due to the high-security of the Naval Dockyard at Pembroke Dock, and the munitions transported.

The Pembroke & Tenby Company obtained powers in 1866 to extend their standard-gauge line from Whitland to Carmarthen. This would have enabled the Pembroke & Tenby to link up with the standard-gauge network through the Llanelly Railway, the Vale of Towy Railway and the Central Wales line. Through a series of inter-company working agreements, this would have had the effect of giving the London & North Western Railway unrestricted access to west Wales. Within the Act for the extension to Carmarthen was a schedule which allowed either party (the Pembroke & Tenby or the Great Western) to request the Great Western for running powers to the Pembroke company. In doing this, the cost of adding a rail to mix the gauge and installing the necessary junctions at Whitland and Carmarthen was £20,000 to be paid to the Great Western within 18 months of the request. The request was made by the Pembroke company and consequently the Great Western converted the up line to standard gauge leaving the down line purely as broad. This was not what the Pembroke company was wanting, but it had to accept it. The Great Western maintained a crossing loop at St Clears for the broad gauge and this caused some hindrance to the Pembroke company. The conversion is noted as the first pure broad to standard gauge for the Great Western.

The Pembroke & Tenby ran the first goods trains to Carmarthen on 1 June 1868 and passenger services in August 1869. The GWR began leasing the line on 1 July 1896, before finally amalgamated it a year later.

In 1895, the Rosebush line was opened from Clynderwen to Letterston along the old Maenclochog line, and construction started on extending it to Goodwick and the proposed new harbour at Fishguard. A bill was approved by Parliament for the railway to extend eastwards to Carmarthen, although this was stopped when the line was bought out by the Great Western Railway in 1898. In 1906, the railway was extended from Letterston to Fishguard & Goodwick followed in 1909 with Fishguard Harbour.

The Rosebush line was closed during World War I because its rails were shipped to the Western Front in 1917 for use by the British Army. In 1923, the line was relaid. However, passenger services ceased in 1937. The entire line was closed in 1949.

Passenger services stopped on the Whitland and Cardigan branch in 1962, followed by freight in 1963. The line to Neyland followed in 1964. Pembrokeshire escaped lightly from the 1963 Beeching cuts as none of the remaining three branches – to Fishguard, Milford Haven, and Pembroke Dock via Tenby – were proposed for closure. The Pembroke Dock branch survived a later closure proposal in the late 1960s.

The first freight line to the oil refineries was built in 1960, when Esso opened their first in Milford Haven.

=== Current services ===
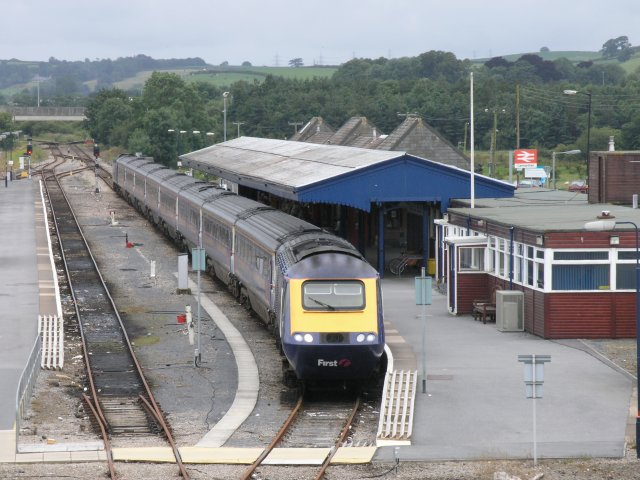
A First Great Western high speed service at Carmarthen

Until 2013, services on the West Wales line were compromised by the existence of a stretch of single track on the otherwise double-tracked main line. This 5 miles (8 km) stretch of single track is between Cockett West Junction in the western suburbs of Swansea and Duffryn West Junction to the east of Llanelli. Within this section, the River Loughor was crossed on a viaduct which required significant works to accommodate two tracks. Plans were advanced to replace the viaduct and restore the double track, and this was completed in April 2013.

One intermediate station, Gowerton, also lies on this single-track stretch, with just the former Down (westbound) platform in use for trains in either direction. The disused former up platform (without track) is still in existence. Less than half of all trains passing through Gowerton can be scheduled to make stops owing to pathing limitations. Additionally, this tight pathing compromised route performance which can amplify delays and hence impact connections into and out of the long-distance Intercity services between Swansea, Cardiff and London. This is important since there are many interchange passengers from the Pembroke Dock line, which is mainly served by trains terminating at Swansea, for Cardiff and English destinations.

The double tracking work between Cockett and Dyffryn was completed by July 2013, with a revamped Gowerton railway station having the disused platform brought back into use. This resulted in Gowerton station having an additional 95 trains stopping there every week. Additional problems are also found on the Single Lead Junction at Swansea Loop East junction (north of Swansea station), which causes conflict between trains from west of Swansea and the eastbound main line High Speed Train services.

Great Western Railway introduced a new timetable in 2023, significantly increasing the service on the West Wales line. Their change added 65 trains every week on the line, extending services which previously started or terminated at Swansea to call at Llanelli, Pembrey & Burry Port and Carmarthen.

Transport for Wales, Iarnród Éireann and Stena Line promote SailRail using the Fishguard Harbour to Rosslare Europort service, which links with the Iarnród Éireann trains to Dublin Connolly on the Dublin–Rosslare railway line.

== Route ==
The cities, towns and villages served by the route are listed below; those in italics are served by InterCity express services.

=== Swansea to Whitland ===
- Swansea
  - connection with South Wales Main Line
- Gowerton
- Llanelli
  - connection with Heart of Wales line and Swansea District line
- Pembrey and Burry Port
- Kidwelly (request stop)
- Ferryside (request stop)
- Carmarthen
- Whitland (junction for Pembroke Dock branch, served by inter-city services on summer Saturdays).

=== Pembroke Dock branch ===
All stations on this line are served by at least one of the two inter-city services that run along this line on summer Saturdays:

- Narberth (request stop)
- Kilgetty (request stop)
- Saundersfoot (request stop)
- Tenby
- Penally (request stop)
- Manorbier
- Lamphey (request stop)
- Pembroke
- Pembroke Dock.

=== Whitland to Clarbeston Road ===
- Clunderwen (request stop). Former junction for the North Pembrokeshire and Fishguard Railway
- Clarbeston Road (request stop, junction for Milford Haven and Fishguard branches).

=== Milford Haven branch ===
- Haverfordwest
- Johnston (request stop)
- Milford Haven.

=== Fishguard branch ===
- Former connection with the North Pembrokeshire and Fishguard Railway, which closed in May 1949
- Fishguard and Goodwick
- Fishguard Harbour.

== Services ==
=== Great Western Railway ===
==== Regular services ====
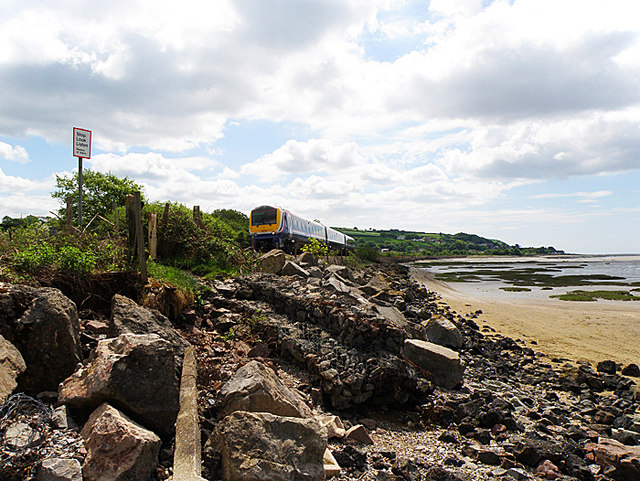
A Class 175 DMU en route to Carmarthen

In May 2023, extra services were added for the first time since their reduction in the late 1990s. It now operates the following services:

- Monday to Saturday, every two hours from Carmarthen to London Paddington
- Monday to Saturday, every two hours from London Paddington to Carmarthen
- Sundays, three morning/afternoon from London Paddington to Carmarthen
- Sundays, three afternoon/evening from Carmarthen to London Paddington.

==== Summer period ====
- Additional daily services are provided between Pembroke Dock and London Paddington.

=== Transport for Wales ===
- Milford Haven to Manchester Piccadilly, via Swansea, every two hours
- Pembroke Dock to Swansea – every two hours
  - A standard repeating departure time results in a 58-minute layover at Pembroke Dock, with trains passing each other at Tenby, the only passing loop between Whitland and Pembroke Dock
- Carmarthen to Manchester Piccadilly, via Swansea, every two hours.

Transport for Wales proposed operating additional services between Tenby and Swansea, in the summer of 2025.

Most services are timed to provide a connection at Swansea to GWR services to London Paddington.

==== Other services ====
- Fishguard Harbour to Swansea: one train per night, connecting with the night ferry to Rosslare Europort, in Ireland
- Fishguard Harbour to Cardiff Central, avoiding Swansea – one train per day (normally via the Swansea District Line), connecting with daytime conventional ferry to Rosslare Europort
- Heart of Wales Line services between Shrewsbury and Swansea (five trains a day) travel over the Swansea to Llanelli section of the West Wales Lines
- Irregular local trains to and from Fishguard Harbour (some going only as far east as Clarbeston Road, some coming all the way from Cardiff, via Swansea), which started on 12 September 2011, after a petition organised by two 15-year-olds.

=== Freight ===
The junction on the Fishguard branch to the former North Pembrokeshire and Fishguard Railway, which now leads to the former RNAD Trecwn site, has been refurbished.:

- One of the oil refineries near Milford Haven generates daily long-distance freight trains
- The Tata Trostre tinplate works generates some freight traffic.

== Developments and upgrades ==
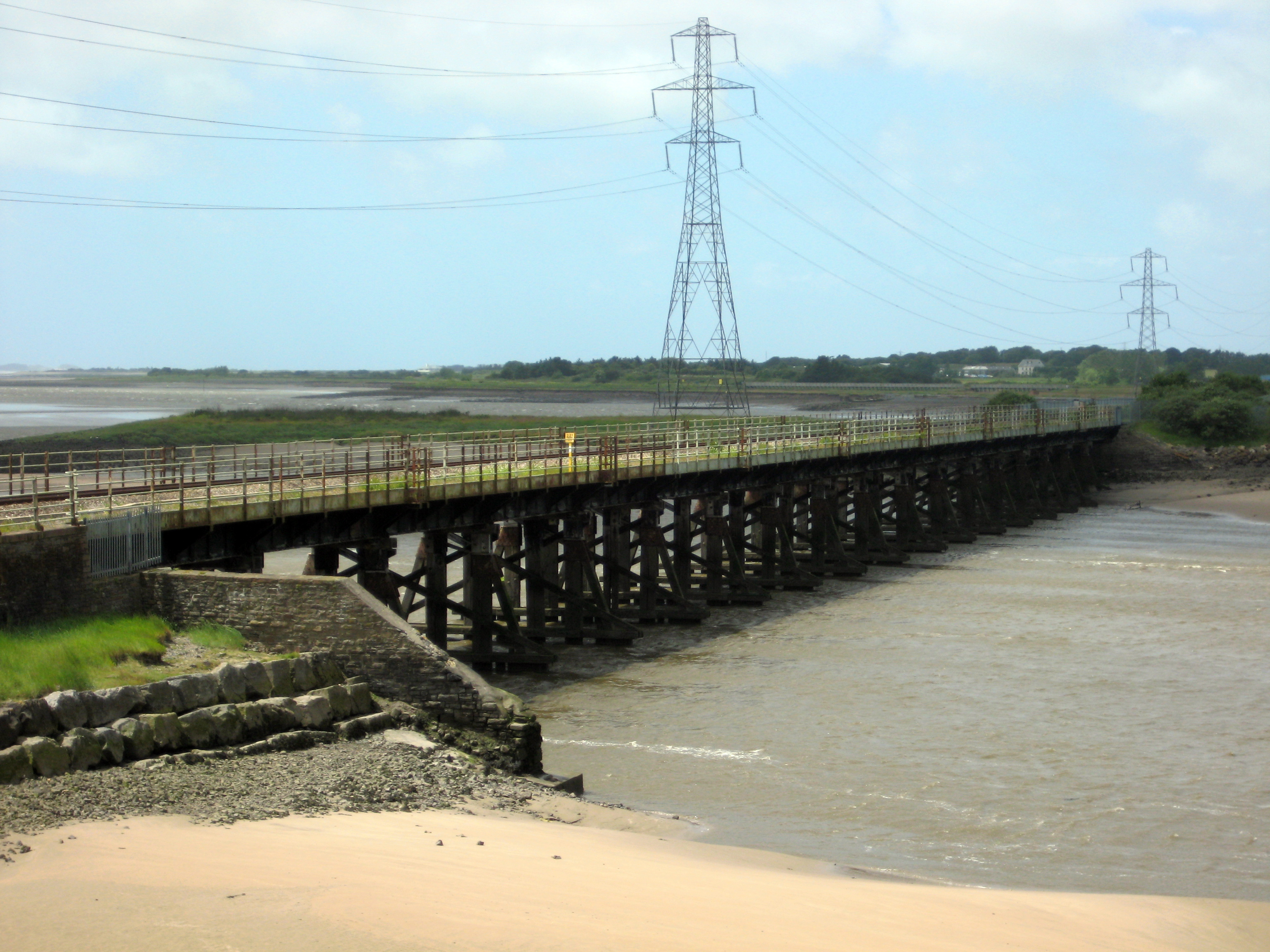
The former wooden Loughor Rail Viaduct was replaced by a concrete/steel structure in 2013

In August 2006, SWWITCH performed a case review of the Fishguard branch to decide whether it was economically viable to continue to operate a passenger service to the harbour given the very scant (boat-trains only) service. In 2011, a local campaign resulted in extra service being launched. A year later, it was announced that the closed Fishguard and Goodwick station would reopen.

In December 2008, the Welsh Assembly announced it had secured funding from the European Fund for Strategic Investments to upgrade sections of the line between Gowerton and Loughor. The work, which was completed by 8 July 2013, included the replacement of the wooden Loughor Rail Viaduct with a concrete/steel structure across the river Loughor, the subsequent redoubling of the line between Swansea and Llanelli and the reopening on the old platform at Gowerton. The improvement work has allowed more trains to stop at Gowerton while decreasing overall travel times, and an increase in the frequency of services between Swansea and Llanelli. In 2015, Network Rail made the proposal to reopen Cockett in its annual strategic business plan.

In 2018, community campaigning began to improve services and facilities at Pwmbroke Dock.

== See also ==
- Traws Link Cymru
