= RNAD Trecwn =

British munitions depot

Coordinates: 51°57′18.2″N 4°57′35.32″W

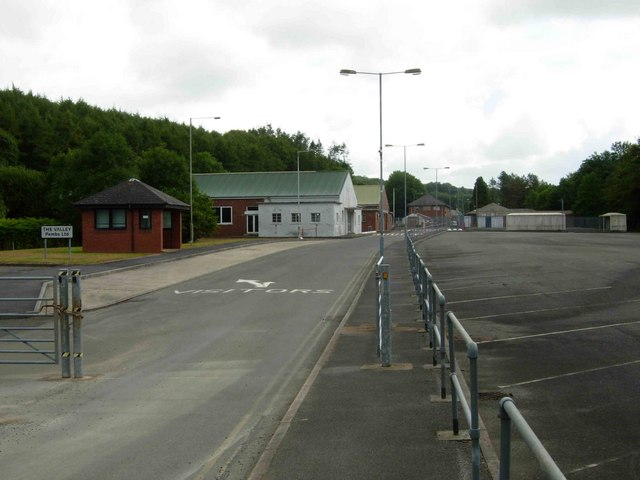
Entrance to the former RNAD Trecwn

RNAD Trecwn is a decommissioned Royal Navy Armaments Depot, south of Fishguard in the village of Trecwn, Pembrokeshire, West Wales.

Built in 1938 to store and supply naval mines and munitions ordnance to the Royal Navy, at its height during the Cold War 400 permanent workers were deployed at the site, housed in an MoD built town infrastructure. The site had an on-site, 2 ft 6 in (762 mm) narrow gauge railway, built using copper to reduce sparks. The weapons were both delivered to the site and then distributed using standard gauge rail to Fishguard, Neyland for Milford Haven, and latterly Pembroke Dock.

Decommissioned in 1992, all 58 cavern storage bunkers and the extensive above ground network of storage sheds and other military buildings remain in place. Ownership of the site was transferred from the Ministry of Defence to Anglo-Irish consortium Omega Pacific in 1998, and then by court order to the Manhattan Loft Corporation in 2002. The site is being redeveloped as an industrial park.

== Construction ==
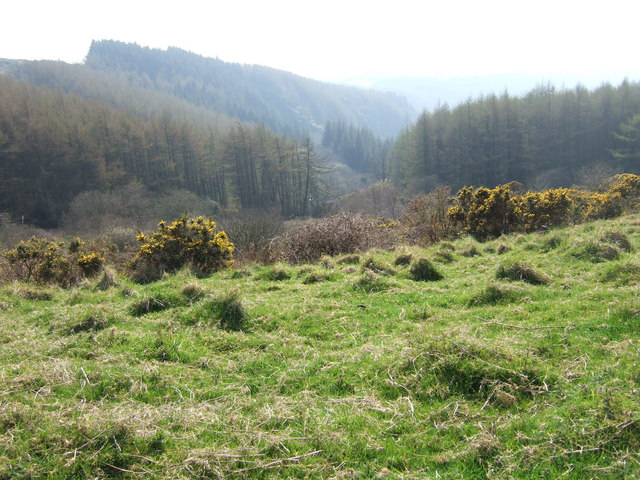
View north towards the Trecwn valley, showing the highly protected nature of the site

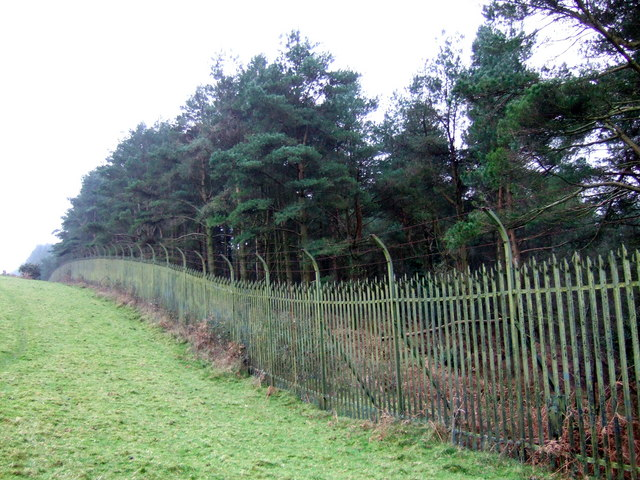
Security fence surrounds the entire site of the former RNAD Trecwn

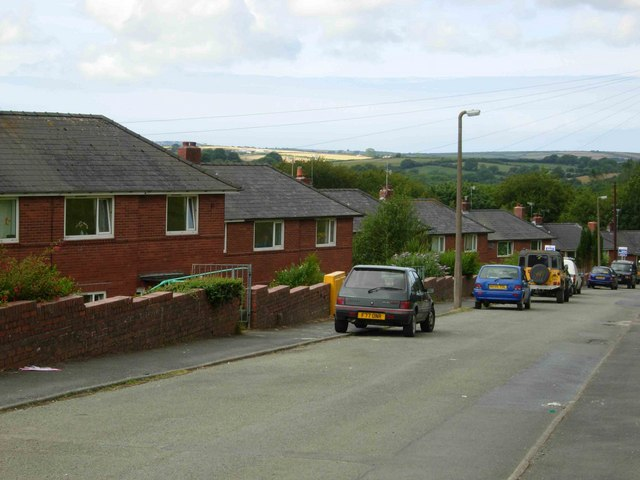
MoD built houses for workers at RNAD Trecwn

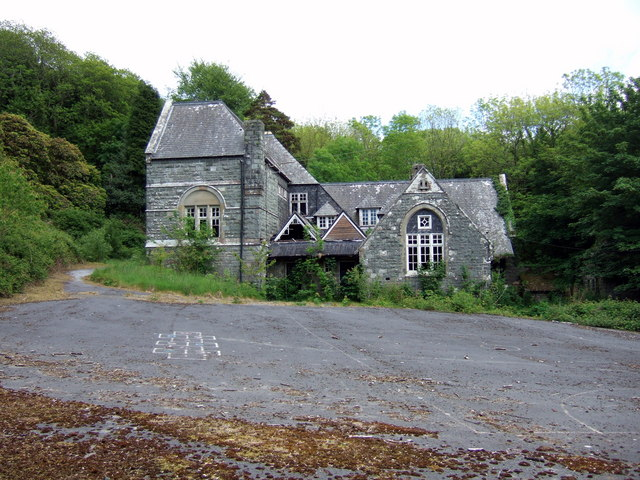
The former Barham Primary school, used by RNAD Trecwn workers' children

Located on the former North Pembrokeshire and Fishguard Railway, 3 miles (4.8 km) south of Fishguard, construction was commenced in 1938. Its location allowed supply of naval mines and munitions via rail from the West Wales Lines Fishguard branch, and distribution via a series of local deep sea ports, including Fishguard harbour and Neyland for Milford Haven.

As with all munitions depots, safety and particularly planning for explosion prevention and firefighting was a major priority at the depot. The site used a specific design of 2 ft 6 in (762 mm) gauge for on-site distribution to minimise manual handling. For fire fighting two reservoirs are built into the hillside on opposite sides of the valley to supply high-pressure water to the onsite fire hydrants, which are located both within each of the 58 storage chambers and alongside each surface building.

Due to its scale and location, the MoD built a whole new infrastructure around the existing village to support the depot, with workers transported in, due to the remote location. This included three separate housing estates (still occupied today), and a waste water treatment plant. Nearby Barham Memorial School (built in 1877 with funding from the Barham family, and a Grade II listed building), closed in 2001 due to falling registers after the RNAD closed.

== Layout and operations ==
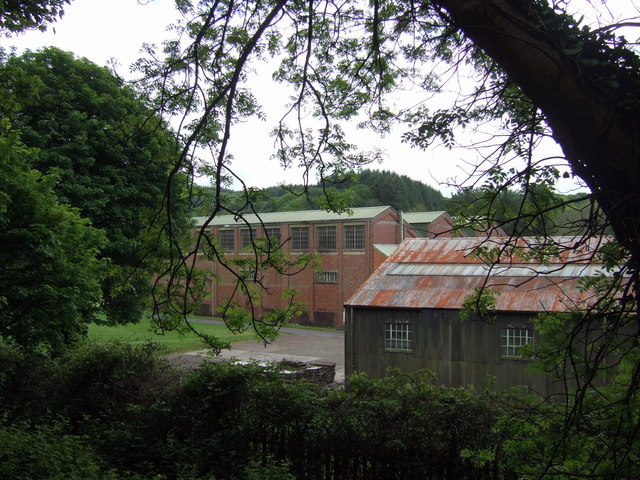
Surface buildings at the former RNAD Trecwn

The depot has a traditional herringbone layout along the valley, giving access to 58 cavern-based storage chambers, each approximately 200 feet (61 m) in length, which have been hewn into the rock of the valley sides. Each cavern storage chamber can be accessed either via road, standard gauge rail or the site's own narrow gauge railway.

Munitions would be brought onto site mainly via standard gauge rail, and then distributed onsite using the specifically designed narrow gauge railway. Road access was mainly used for non-explosive access such as for workers and contractors, although it was occasionally used for supply and distribution. Distribution was via standard gauge rail using either Great Western Railway or British Railways locomotives hauling MoD/Royal Navy private owner wagons directly to Fishguard harbour, or Neyland for Milford Haven.

After the closure of the RNAD sub-depot at Pembroke Dock, the Trecwn site gained additional workers and a longer distribution chain. At this high point of operations during the cold war, it employed up to 400 direct workers.

== Transport access ==
Purposefully located on the former North Pembrokeshire and Fishguard Railway, it gave the site easy access to excellent rail distribution. Direct passenger access was also provided by rail, with workmen's trains reversing in from the Fishguard and Goodwick railway station until 1 August 1964.

=== Standard gauge ===
Just south of the main entrance and main security fence stands a single railway platform, for workers access to the site. Within the security fence, the marshalling yard of 8 parallel loops exists, formerly shunted by a dedicated MoD diesel hydraulic shunting locomotive. The line then extends down the valley, through a gauge exchange shed for access to the narrow gauge infrastructure, and then provides direct access to the 58 cavern storage chambers via a series of herring-bone shaped sidings.

Supply trains would run from the site to both Fishguard harbour, Neyland for Milford Haven, and Pembroke Dock. At Fishguard the line extended beyond the ferry terminal at Fishguard Harbour railway station, continuing along the breakwater to a single line spur, allowing for transfer of munitions to Royal Navy ships.

=== Narrow gauge ===
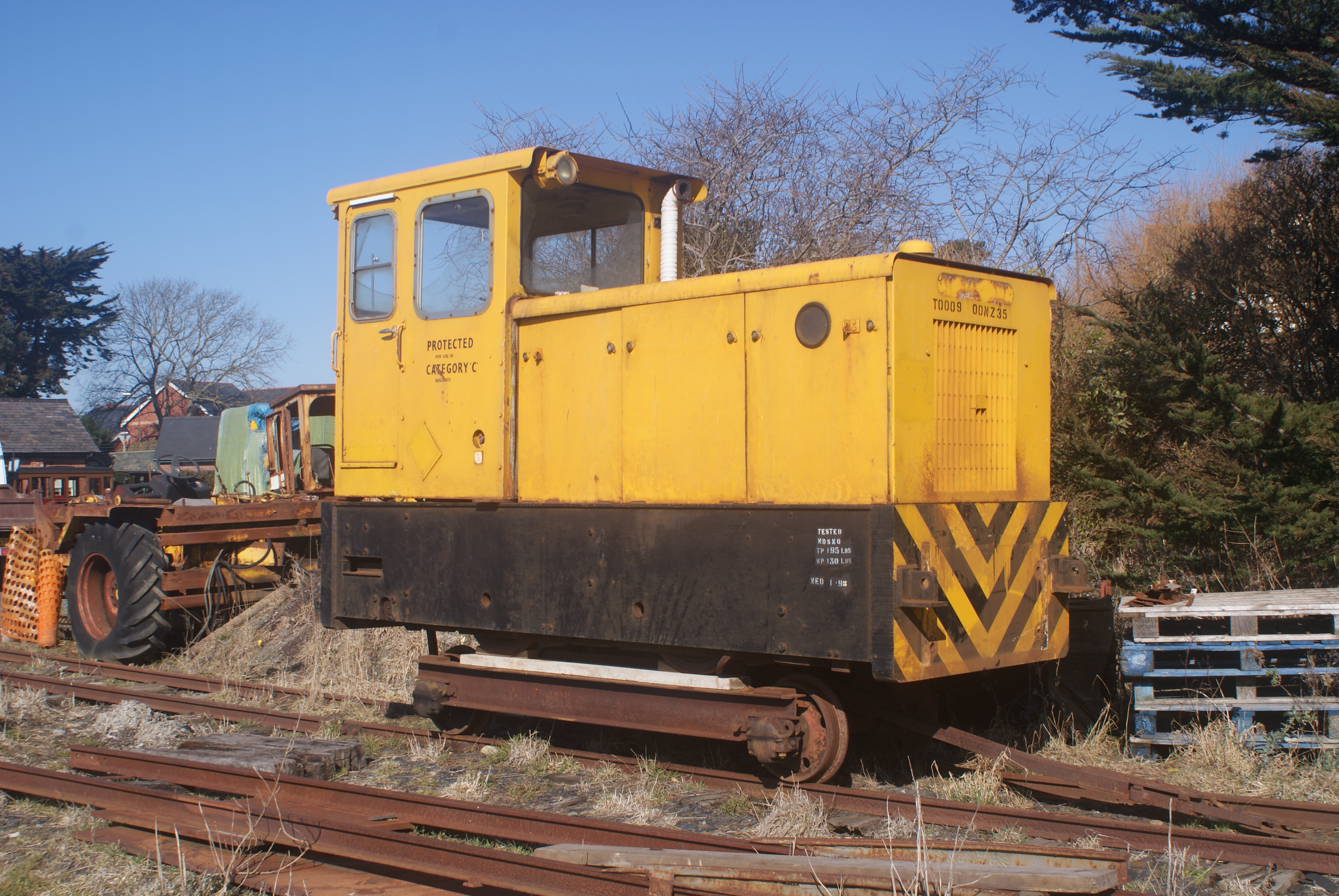
Body of former RNAD Trecwn narrow gauge Baguley-Drewry diesel hydraulic locomotive T 009 00 NZ 35(works number 3781) at Tywyn Wharf on the Talyllyn Railway

A 2 ft 6 in (762 mm) gauge line traverses the entire site, with direct access to the 58 cavern storage chambers. All rail infrastructure was built in copper to reduce the risk of sparks. Serviced via its own on-site locomotive shed and works, the line was equipped with a series of specially provided wooden enclosed wagons, with sliding roof covers. This allowed sea mines and other munitions to be directly placed within the wagons from overhead gantries, and transported over the entire site without access via any form of side door, hence enhancing safety. The narrow gauge line therefore became the main method of on-site distribution, with standard gauge rail or road the off site access method.

=== Road ===
Connected to the A40 road via a 2 miles (3.2 km) private access road, the link gave access to both workers, suppliers and the occasional munitions delivery and distribution.

== Sale, current use ==
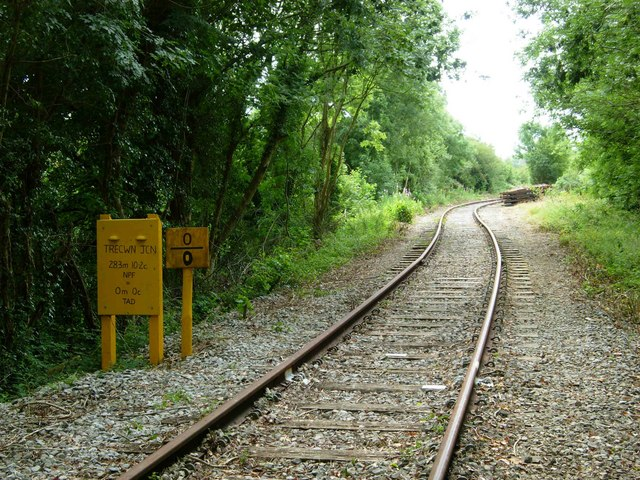
Rail access still in place in 2006 to the former RNAD Trecwn

In the early 1990s, Trecwn was placed on care and maintenance by the MoD.

The entire site was sold to Anglo-Irish consortium Omega Pacific in 1998 for £329,000, with a stated intention of using the surface buildings for aircraft engine maintenance, while the caverns would be used for the storage of low-level nuclear waste. However, a lack of planning consent (noise of the engines, level of radiation), and local opposition meant that the company ended up in court in 2002, and was ordered to sell the site to the Manhattan Loft Corporation, in conjunction with property developer Richard Harrington, within 10 weeks.

The Manhattan Loft Corporation intend to develop the site as a multi-use industrial estate, with the surface buildings rented or leased for light industrial purposes, and the caverns for storage and distribution. Network Rail have not only kept the railway connection operational, but refurbished it to allow the site to develop as an Intermodal freight traffic distribution site from Fishguard.

All of the narrow gauge infrastructure and stock has been removed. Some stock has been transferred to the similarly gauged Welshpool and Llanfair Light Railway and Gunpowder Railway, and other items were regauged onto the Talyllyn Railway and the Welsh Highland Heritage Railway.

The site was used as the filming location for the 2015 Channel 4 series "SAS:Who Dares Wins".

In late 2011, Renewable Developments Wales applied for planning permission to build a diesel-powered peaking plant on 14,000 square metres (150,000 sq ft) of land close to the former main entrance. The plan was to produce 20MW of electricity using 11 generators, each stored within its own soundproof container.

Plans submitted by The Valley (Pembrokeshire) Ltd to build a 25-megawatt biomass energy plant on the site were conditionally approved in 2015, subject to an environmental permit from Natural Resources Wales (NRW), but by August 2018 work, with the promise of 40 jobs, had not been started by current owners Manhattan Loft Corporation, leading to questions by the local councillor.
