= Johnston railway station =

Railway station in Pembrokeshire, Wales

Johnston
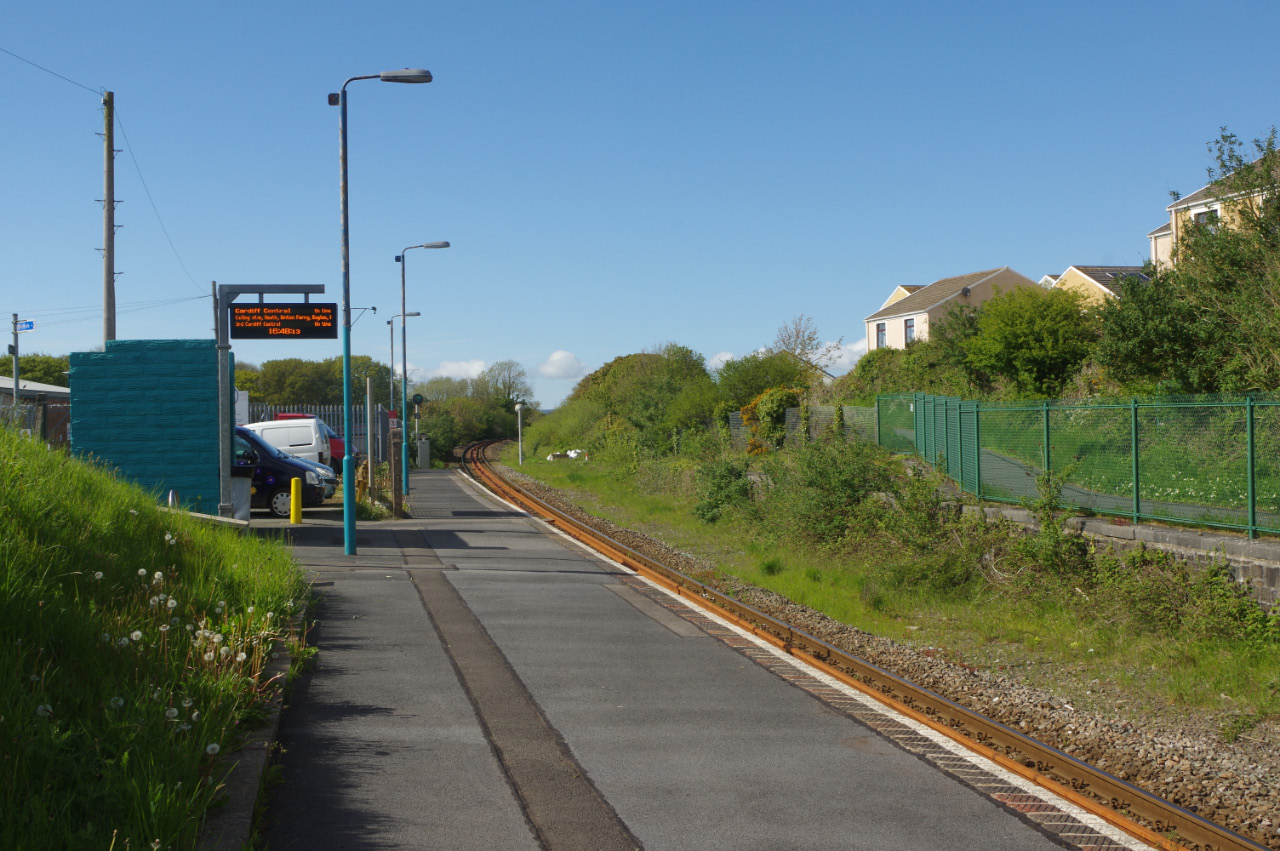
- Johnston station in 2018.

General information
- Location: Johnston, Pembrokeshire; Wales
- Coordinates: 51.757°N 4.996°W
- Grid reference: SM932106
- Manager: Transport for Wales Rail
- Platforms: 1

Other information
- Station code: JOH
- Classification: DfT category F2

History
- Opened: 15 April 1856

Key dates
- 15 April 1856: Opened as Johnston
- November 1859: Renamed Milford Road
- 7 September 1863: Renamed Johnston
- 18 June 1928: Renamed Johnston (Pembroke)
- 3 May 1976: Renamed Johnston (Dyfed)
- ?: Renamed Johnston

Passengers
- 2021/22: ▲5,498
- 2022/23: ▲6,208
- 2023/24: ▲6,956
- 2024/25: ▲9,062
- 2025/26: ▲10,896
Location
Notes
- Passenger statistics from the Office of Rail and Road

Johnston (Pembs) railway station is an unstaffed railway station in the village of Johnston in Pembrokeshire, Wales. It opened in 1856 as part of the final section of the South Wales Railway main line from Haverfordwest to Neyland. It has gone by various names and is now operated by Transport for Wales Rail. Train stops are made at the station by request only.

The station was the junction for trains to Neyland and also the branch line to Milford Haven. Johnston is the penultimate stop on the West Wales Line before Milford Haven.

== History ==
The station was opened with the final section of the South Wales Railway main line, from Haverfordwest to Neyland, on 15 April 1856. Originally named Johnston, it has been renamed several times: to Milford Road in November 1859; to Johnston on 7 September 1863; to Johnston (Pembroke) on 18 June 1928; to Johnston (Dyfed) on 3 May 1976, before finally resuming its original name. The station served as the junction for trains to Neyland and also the branch line to Milford Haven (the main line since the closure of the Neyland route in 1964).

Milford passengers would here make a connection to services eastwards to Haverfordwest and beyond. A station building was situated on the upside, and a waiting shelter on the downside. A pedestrian bridge connected the two platforms. A goods shed survived until the 1930s.

At a short distance north of the station, the line was connected to the railway line serving the anthracite trade at Hook. The route north of here was double track until the late 1980s, with the station signal box controlling access to the private sidings serving the oil refineries at Robeston and Waterston as well as the single line portion through to the terminus at Milford Haven. Both it and the neighbouring box at Haverfordwest were closed in 1988 when the line was re-signalled and singled south of Clarbeston Road (the former southbound platform went out of use as a result, all trains thenceforth using the former northbound platform).

== Services ==
InterCity 125 services to/from London Paddington ran through Johnston to Milford Haven until the early 1990s, ending in 1994.

The station, and all trains serving it, are operated by Transport for Wales Rail. Trains stop here by request only. The usual service pattern is one train every two hours in each direction, westwards to Milford Haven railway station and eastwards to Manchester Piccadilly via Carmarthen, Swansea and Cardiff Central.

Preceding station	National Rail	Following station
Haverfordwest	Transport for Wales Rail; Fishguard Harbour or Swansea - Milford Haven	Milford Haven
	Disused railways	
Haverfordwest; Line and station open	Great Western Railway; South Wales Railway	Neyland; Line and station closed

== Facilities ==
The station is unstaffed, so tickets must be bought on the train or prior to travel. There is small covered shelter available, along with a customer help point, timetable information boards and a digital CIS display to offer train running details. A free car park is located opposite the platform, with capacity for 8 vehicles.
