= Mathry Road Halt railway station =

Former railway station in Wales

Mathry Road Halt
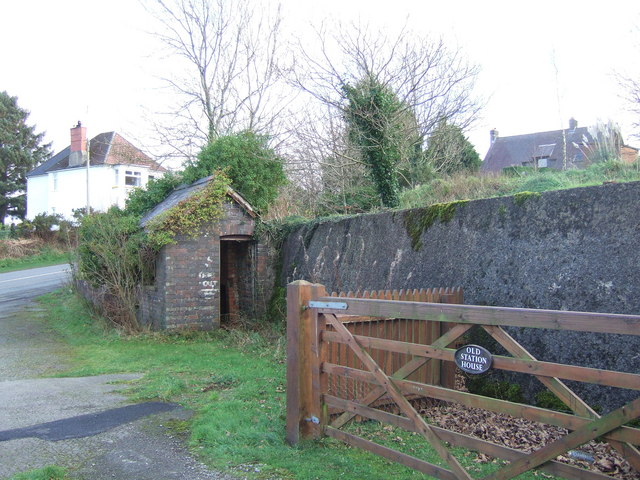

General information
- Location: Letterston, Pembrokeshire; Wales
- Coordinates: 51.9348°N 5.0162°W
- Platforms: 2

Other information
- Status: Disused

History
- Original company: Great Western Railway
- Post-grouping: Great Western Railway

Key dates
- 1 August 1923: Station opened
- 6 April 1964: Station closed
Location

Mathry Road Halt railway station was on the Clarbeston Road and Letterston line of the Great Western Railway. It served the village of Letterston 1 mile to the south east, and on railway maps was suffixed for St David's. It was named Mathry when opened in 1923, and renamed the following year.

== History ==
The Clarbeston Road and Letterston Railway, a subsidiary of the Great Western Railway (GWR), was opened on 30 August 1906, but at first there were no intermediate stations. However, there was a signal box at Wolf's Castle, because although most of the route was built as double track, a portion near the middle, which included Spittal Tunnel and the cutting through Treffgarne Gorge, was single-track, and it was necessary to have signal boxes at each end of the single-track section. The single-track section was later doubled, but although the temporary signal boxes at Spittal and Treffgarne closed with the introduction of full double-track working on 17 December 1906, Wolf's Castle signal box was retained to break the section, allowing two trains to proceed in the same direction between Clarbeston Road and Letterston simultaneously; there was also a crossover.

The first of three intermediate stations to open on the line was Wolf's Castle Halt on 1 October 1913. The service was operated using GWR steam rail motors running between Fishguard Harbour and Neyland; there were three trains a day in each direction.

The signal box at Wolf's Castle Halt was taken out of use on 17 February 1925; it was transferred to Mathry Road.

The station closed on 6 April 1964, as did all the other stations between Clarbeston Road and Fishguard Harbour. The line remains open for services to Fishguard & Goodwick and Fishguard Harbour stations. Falling traffic on the line caused it to be reduced to single-track on 16 May 1971 with a passing loop at Letterston Junction.

== Notes ==
Preceding station	Historical railways	Following station
Jordanston Halt; Line open, station closed	Great Western Railway; Clarbeston Road and Letterston Railway	Welsh Hook Halt; Line open, station closed
