= Clarbeston Road and Letterston Railway =

The Clarbeston Road and Letterston Railway was a small railway company formed to give the Great Western Railway a more direct route to the port at Fishguard Harbour.

== History ==
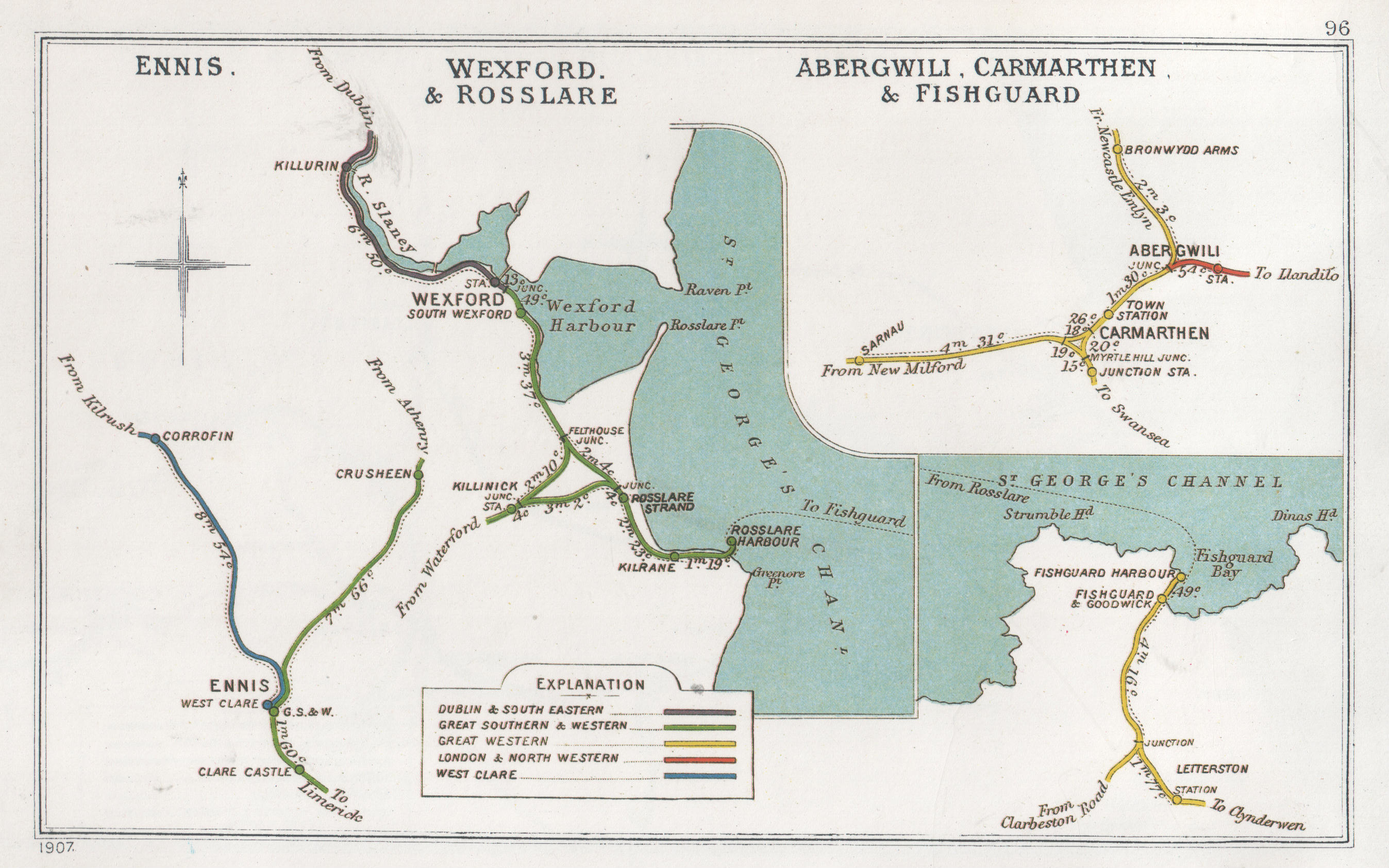
A 1907 Railway Clearing House junction diagram showing (lower right) railways in the vicinity of Letterston Junction, including part of the Clarbeston Road and Letterston Railway

The Great Western Railway (GWR) originally obtained access to Ireland over the South Wales Railway, which ran via Clunderwen, Clarbeston Road and Haverfordwest to Neyland, where a small port was built as part of the railway facilities; the line was opened as far as Haverfordwest in 1854, and extended to Neyland in 1856.

The original proposal of 1844 (authorised by an act of Parliament in 1845) had been for the western terminus to be at Fishguard, with Haverfordwest on a branch, and by August 1847 work was in progress within 7 miles (11 km) of Fishguard. In 1848, the effects of the Great Irish Famine made Ireland a less attractive proposition, and work on the western end of the line stopped as a result. In 1851, work restarted, but it was decided that the western terminus should be on the Milford Haven Waterway, and Neyland was selected; the section between Clarbeston Road and Fishguard, some 14 miles (23 km) in length, was not built.

In 1878, the Rosebush and Fishguard Railway (R&FR) was formed, to extend the Narberth Road and Maenclochog Railway (NR&MR), which had opened in 1876, to Fishguard; the R&FR bought the NR&MR in 1881 and was renamed the North Pembrokeshire and Fishguard Railway (NP&FR) in 1884, although it only opened approximately 1 mile (1.6 km) of new line. The NP&FR was acquired by the Fishguard and Rosslare Railways and Harbours Co. (F&RR&H) in 1894. In 1899, the F&RR&H sold its railways in Wales to the GWR, which completed the extension of the NP&FR line to Fishguard and Goodwick on 1 July 1899.

A new double-track line was proposed by the GWR to shorten the distance to Fishguard; this was the Clarbeston Road and Letterston Railway, which opened on 30 August 1906 between Clarbeston Junction (271 miles 8 chains (436.3 km) from Paddington) and Letterston Junction (281 miles 58 chains (453.4 km)). Prior to this, Letterston Junction was 283 miles 30 chains (456.0 km) from Paddington via Rosebush. There is one tunnel, Spittal Tunnel, which is 243 yards (222 m) long; the eastern end is 274 miles 40 chains (441.8 km) from Paddington. There were no intermediate stations at first, but three were opened later: Wolf's Castle Halt on 1 October 1913, Welsh Hook Halt on 5 May 1924, and Mathry Road on 1 August 1923.

The intermediate stations were closed on 6 April 1964, but the line remains open for services to Fishguard and Goodwick and Fishguard Harbour stations. Falling traffic on the line caused it to be reduced to single-track on 16 May 1971 with a passing loop at Letterston Junction.
