= Clarbeston =

Village and parish in Pembrokeshire, Wales

Coordinates: 51.85°N 4.84°W

Clarbeston: Welsh: Treglarbes
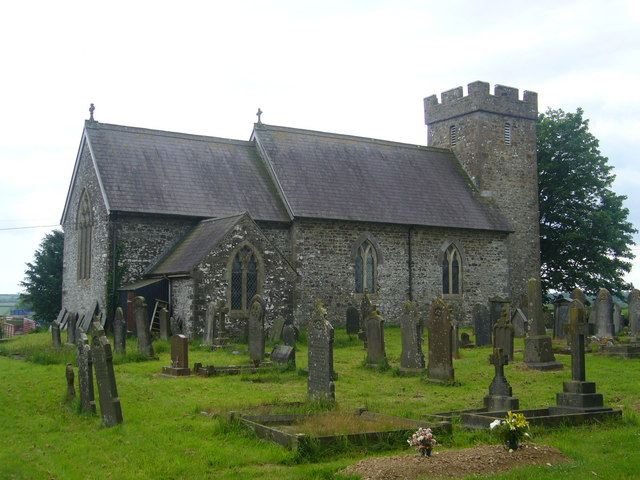
- Parish Church of St Martin

- Location within Pembrokeshire
- Population: 318
- OS grid reference: SN047212
- Community: Wiston
- Principal area: Pembrokeshire
- Preserved county: Dyfed
- Country: Wales
- Sovereign state: United Kingdom
- Post town: CLARBESTON ROAD
- Postcode district: SA63
- Dialling code: 01437
- Police: Dyfed-Powys
- Fire: Mid and West Wales
- Ambulance: Welsh
- UK Parliament: Preseli Pembrokeshire
- Senedd Cymru – Welsh Parliament: Preseli Pembrokeshire

Clarbeston (Welsh: Treglarbes) is a village and parish in Pembrokeshire, Wales, 11 km (6.8 mi) east of Haverfordwest. The parish, together with Wiston and Walton East, constitute the community of Wiston. The population was 318 at the 2011 census.

== Name ==
The English placename means "Clarenbald's farm", Clarenbald being a continental Germanic (perhaps Flemish) personal name.

== Location ==
Clarbeston Road railway station and the surrounding settlement and post town of Clarbeston Road lie to the west of the village.

== Parish ==
The parish is close to the Landsker Line, with the proportion of Welsh speakers declining in the late twentieth century from 41% in 1891 and 44% in 1931 to 27% in 1971.

The parish had an area of 671 ha (1,660 acres). Its census populations were: 180 (1801), 178 (1851), 158 (1901), 114 (1951), 71 (1981)
