= Fishguard Harbour railway station =

Railway station in Pembrokeshire, Wales

Fishguard Harbour Welsh: Porthladd Abergwaun
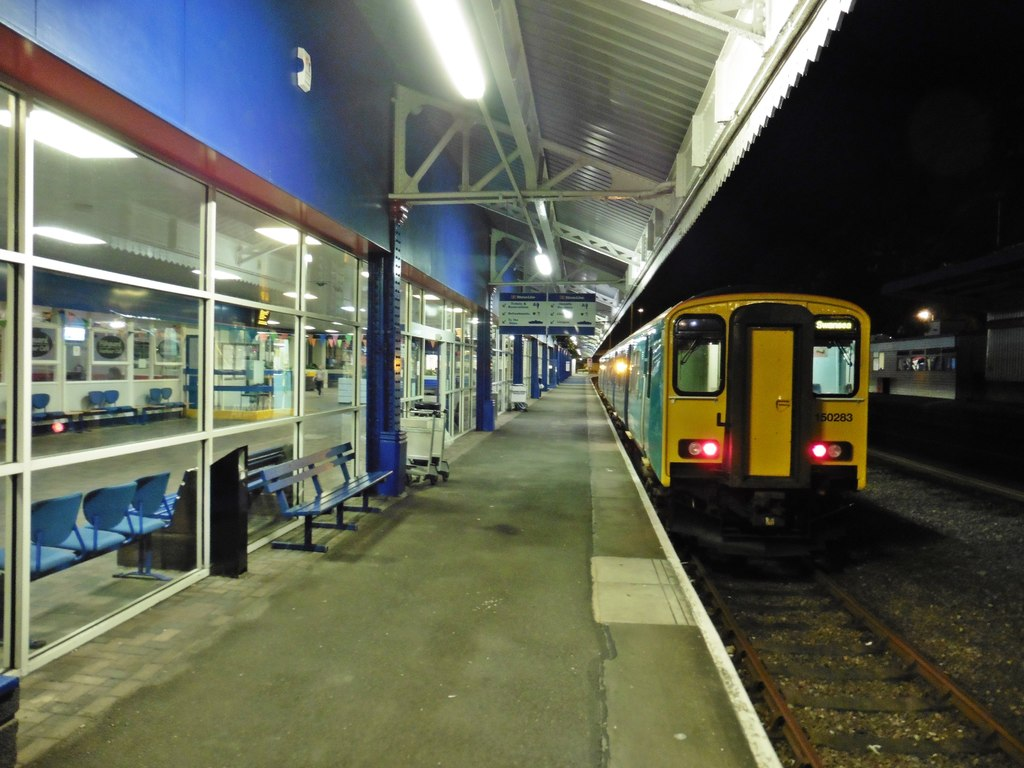
- The station in 2017, with a Class 150 at the platform

General information
- Location: Fishguard Harbour, Pembrokeshire, Wales
- Coordinates: 52.012°N 4.986°W
- Grid reference: SM951389
- Owner: Stena Line
- Manager: Transport for Wales
- Platforms: 1

Other information
- Station code: FGH
- Classification: DfT category E

History
- Original company: Fishguard and Rosslare Railways and Harbours
- Pre-grouping: Great Western Railway
- Post-grouping: Great Western Railway

Key dates
- 30 August 1906: Station opened

Passengers
- 2021/22: ▲5,200
- 2022/23: ▲10,288
- 2023/24: ▼8,388
- 2024/25: ▲9,606
- 2025/26: ▲9,620
- Interchange: 28
Location
Notes
- Passenger statistics from the Office of Rail and Road

Map of Fishguard Bay, Pembrokeshire, with the location of the railway stations.

Fishguard Harbour railway station serves the port of Fishguard Harbour, in Pembrokeshire, Wales. It is the terminus of one of the branches of the West Wales Line from Swansea. The area is also served by Fishguard and Goodwick, on the same line.

== History ==
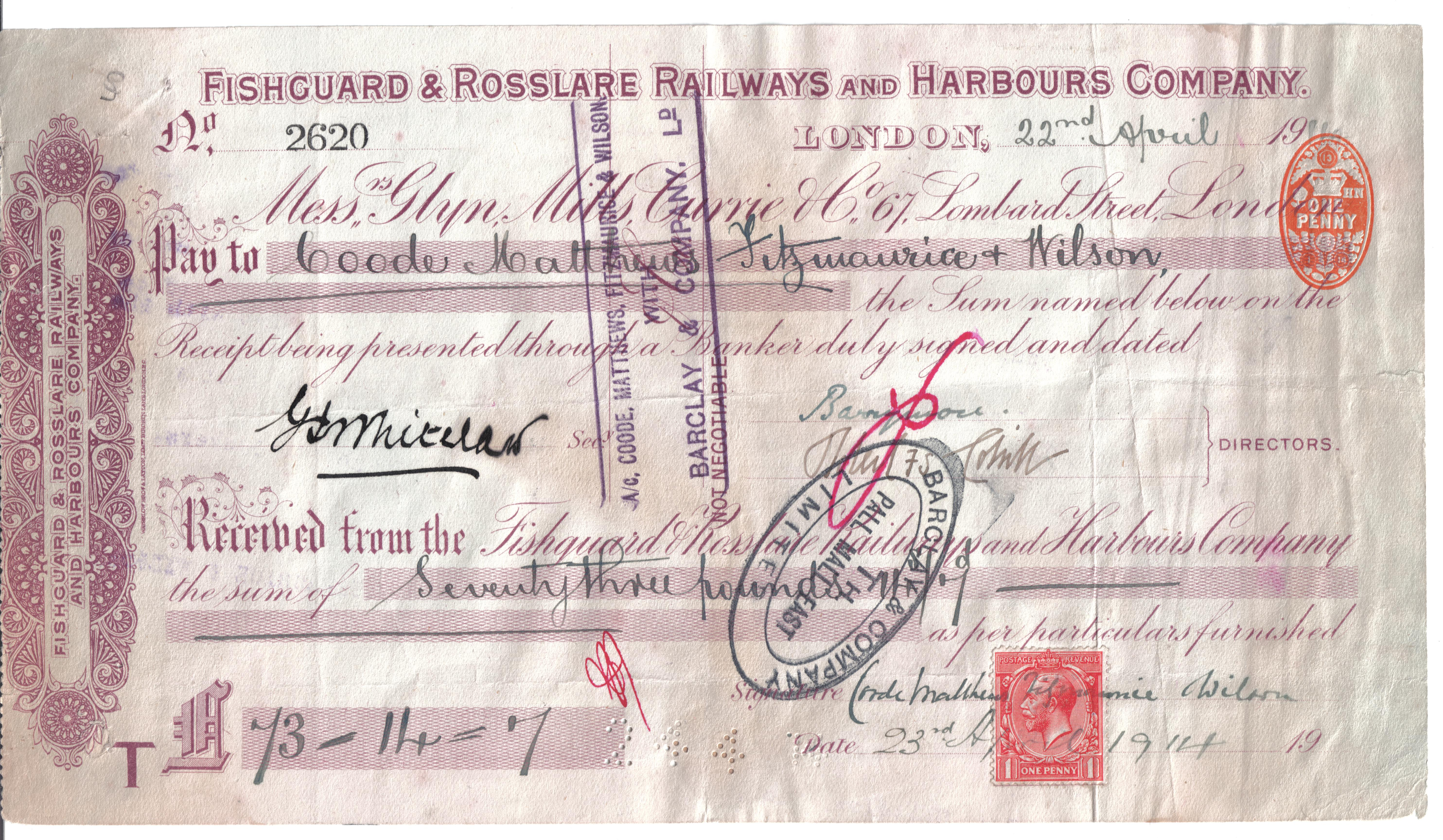
Certificate of the Fishguard and Rosslare Railways and Harbours Company

The Great Western Railway took over the North Pembrokeshire and Fishguard Railway by agreement of 12 February 1898. Its intent was to turn Fishguard into a purpose-built ocean liner port because it wanted to take trans-Atlantic passenger traffic away from Plymouth and Southampton. In preparation of this, the GWR opened its first station, Fishguard & Goodwick, in 1899 when work on the new port began with the construction of Fishguard Harbour's East breakwater.

In conjunction with building the East Breakwater, a new 2 mi (3.2 km) railway would be built to connect to the liner terminal with the West Wales line. The line, which would bypass the steeper gradients and curves on this part of the original line, would have a deep cutting, embankments and two tunnels. However, within two years, the project to build the breakwater and ocean-going terminal was abandoned after it became clear silting (which could not be prevented by dredging) would prevent large ocean-going ships from ever using the port. The East Breakwater was left unfinished. Although two sections of the new railway to the proposed port terminal were completed before the project ended, they were abandoned and never used. Railway traffic would continue to use the original route to Goodwick.

Despite being unable to complete the project as envisaged, the GWR still wanted to create a new port. The 900 m (3,000 ft) North Breakwater was created in deeper water by quarrying stone from the headland at Goodwick. The quarried-out area became the new quay and terminus for the West Wales line. On 30 August 1906, Fishguard Harbour station was officially opened when the Waterford and Cork ferry services were transferred from Neyland. Three years later, the first Cunard liner to call at Fishguard was the RMS Mauretania on 30 August 1909. However, passengers had to be transferred ashore to the waiting London train by tender due to the shallowness of the harbour.

=== Historic services ===
==== 1949 ====
- There were two night-time express trains that ran daily to and from London Paddington
- Eight trains operated Monday to Saturday to and from Clarbeston Road, stopping at Wolf's Castle Halt, Welsh Hook Halt, Mathry Road, Jordanston Halt and Fishguard & Goodwick
- One of those trains were extended to and from Neyland.

==== 1964 to 2003 ====
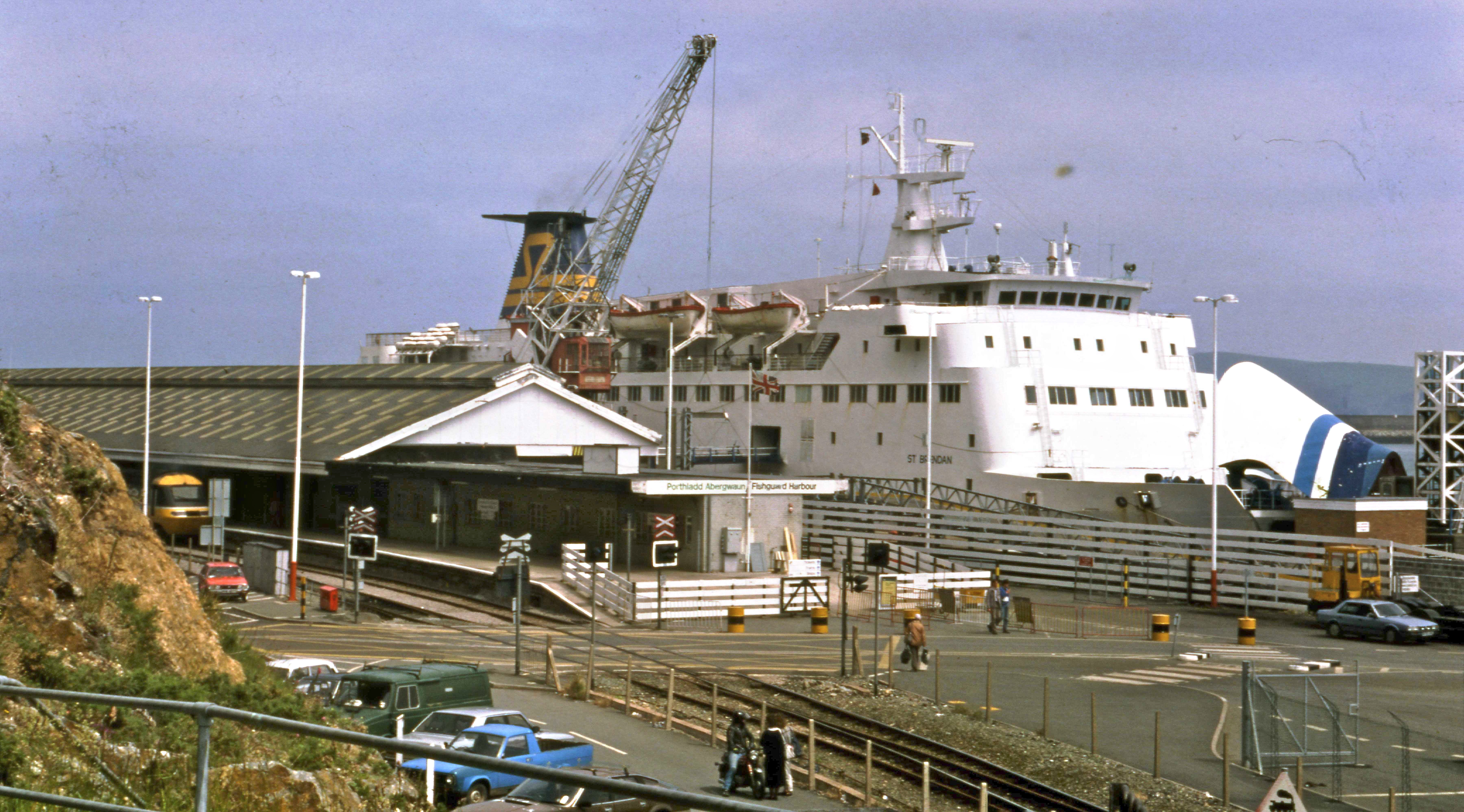
An InterCity 125 and St Brendan ferry, July 1988

- All other stations on the branch were withdrawn on 6 April 1964, leaving the station served by boat trains only; this was during the Beeching cuts period
- Since that date the only scheduled passenger services have been the boat trains
- In recent years, these have been one night service and one day service all year round, despite the summer-only fast ferry. At one stage, the night service was formed of an InterCity 125 train running direct to/from London Paddington. The daytime service was the same, although perhaps for only part of the year. British Rail, Great Western Trains and First Great Western all operated InterCity 125 services to Fishguard Harbour
  - In 2000, the night service was still operated by First Great Western, using InterCity 125s, but the daytime train was operated by Wales & West, meaning there were no longer any daytime through services to Paddington.

==== 2003 ====
The remaining First Great Western Fishguard services were withdrawn when the franchise was taken over by Wales & Borders. This ended almost a century of direct services to or from London Paddington. However, through services to and from other stations were added to the timetable:

- The night-time train started from London Waterloo daily, connecting with Eurostar continental services, with the train arriving at 02.38 Tuesday to Saturday mornings, and 01.00 Sunday and Monday mornings. This arriving service ran empty to Carmarthen, rather than form a return journey, because of this later arrival on Tuesday to Saturday
- The night-time train went to Liverpool Lime Street on Monday to Saturdays and Bristol Temple Meads on Sundays, leaving each day at 01.50. On Tuesday to Saturdays, this was formed of empty stock run from Carmarthen, whereas on Sundays and Mondays, it was formed of the incoming train from Waterloo.
- On Monday to Fridays, the day-time train started from Cardiff Central between 30 June and 5 September, not stopping Swansea and Carmarthen stations. Before and after these dates, the train started from Swansea and also called at Carmarthen.
- On Saturdays, the daytime train went to and from Rhymney
- On Sundays, the daytime train started at Newport and went only as far as Carmarthen, although it offered a five to ten minute connection for London-bound trains.

==== 2003 to 2011 ====
Arriva Trains Wales took over the franchise in December 2003:

- A daytime train operated to and from Cardiff Central, arriving and leaving Fishguard Harbour between 13:30 and 14:00, often starting from and/or terminating at stations beyond Cardiff, such as Birmingham New Street in 2003
  - In 2010 and 2011, the service started from Cardiff and called only at Llanelli and Whitland en route to Fishguard Harbour, making it the only scheduled passenger service to use the Carmarthen avoider line. On the return, the train called at Carmarthen, as well as Whitland and Llanelli, before reaching Cardiff Central; the train then continued onwards to Cheltenham Spa
  - These daytime services therefore avoided Swansea in both directions. This was normally achieved using the Swansea District Line, but occasionally the service was routed via the Swansea Avoiding Line around the back of Landore TMD instead
- A daily train operated at night, arriving and leaving Fishguard Harbour between 01:00 and 02:00
  - The train operated to and from Swansea, but sometimes originated from stations beyond Swansea
  - As maintenance of the railways is predominantly done at night, this train was frequently replaced by buses which usually arrived at Fishguard Harbour at around 02:05 and left after loading/unloading passengers, normally around 02:10.

==== 2011 to 2017 ====
All services were operated by Arriva Trains Wales. The level of service was greatly enhanced from 12 September 2011, when five extra services per day in each direction commenced running to and from Fishguard Harbour Mondays to Saturdays. The five extra services are as follows:

- Two trips to Clarbeston Road, with connections to stations further afield
- One trip to Manchester Piccadilly
- Two trips to Carmarthen
- One early-morning trip from Carmarthen, with no connection from further east.
- Two arrivals from Cardiff Central:
  - One of these detaches from a train to Pembroke Dock at Whitland
  - The other was later extended to start from Gloucester
- Two trips from Clarbeston Road to Fishguard
  - One of which forms a connection out of a train from Manchester, via Cardiff and Swansea
  - The other has no connection from further east.

These were provided on a trial basis until September 2014 and are in addition to the two daily boat trains: one at lunch time and one at night, which provide the traditional ferry connections.

The extra services are the first regular timetabled services to Fishguard Harbour that have not been provided solely for connection with ferries since local services were withdrawn in 1964. Since the additional services only run Monday to Saturday, only the two trains connecting with ferry services serve the station on a Sunday.

The decision to introduce additional trains has been credited to two teenagers from Moylegrove, who collected a 1,440 signature petition in support of the move. A consultation was held in May/June 2011 on the planned services, but did not result in much adjustment to the times. The additional trains for Fishguard initiative has guaranteed funding until 2014, during which a review will be carried out to identify demand and passenger numbers and future funding. The extra services, with trains to and from Cardiff and Clarbeston Road, are not quite what was expected when the Welsh Assembly Government announced it would be funding up to £1.4m annually to provide extra services between Carmarthen and Fishguard.

==== 2017 ====
The ferry sailing schedule was significantly revised in May 2017 resulting in changes to the train times. As a result, there are no longer trains during the night and the 01.50 departure is discontinued. From May 2018, it was proposed to extend the 19.30 from Manchester to Carmarthen to Fishguard Harbour, returning at 02.37 to Carmarthen, with an equivalent bus replacement in the early hours of Sunday.

==== 2021 ====
Due to the COVID-19 pandemic, services on the Fishguard branch were reduced. As of August 2021, there were two daily departures from Mondays to Saturdays: one at midday and one in the late evening. Both services ran to Carmarthen, with the midday service continuing to Cardiff Central.

On Sundays, there was an increased service of three trains per day. The additional mid-afternoon service ran to Swansea.

== Facilities ==
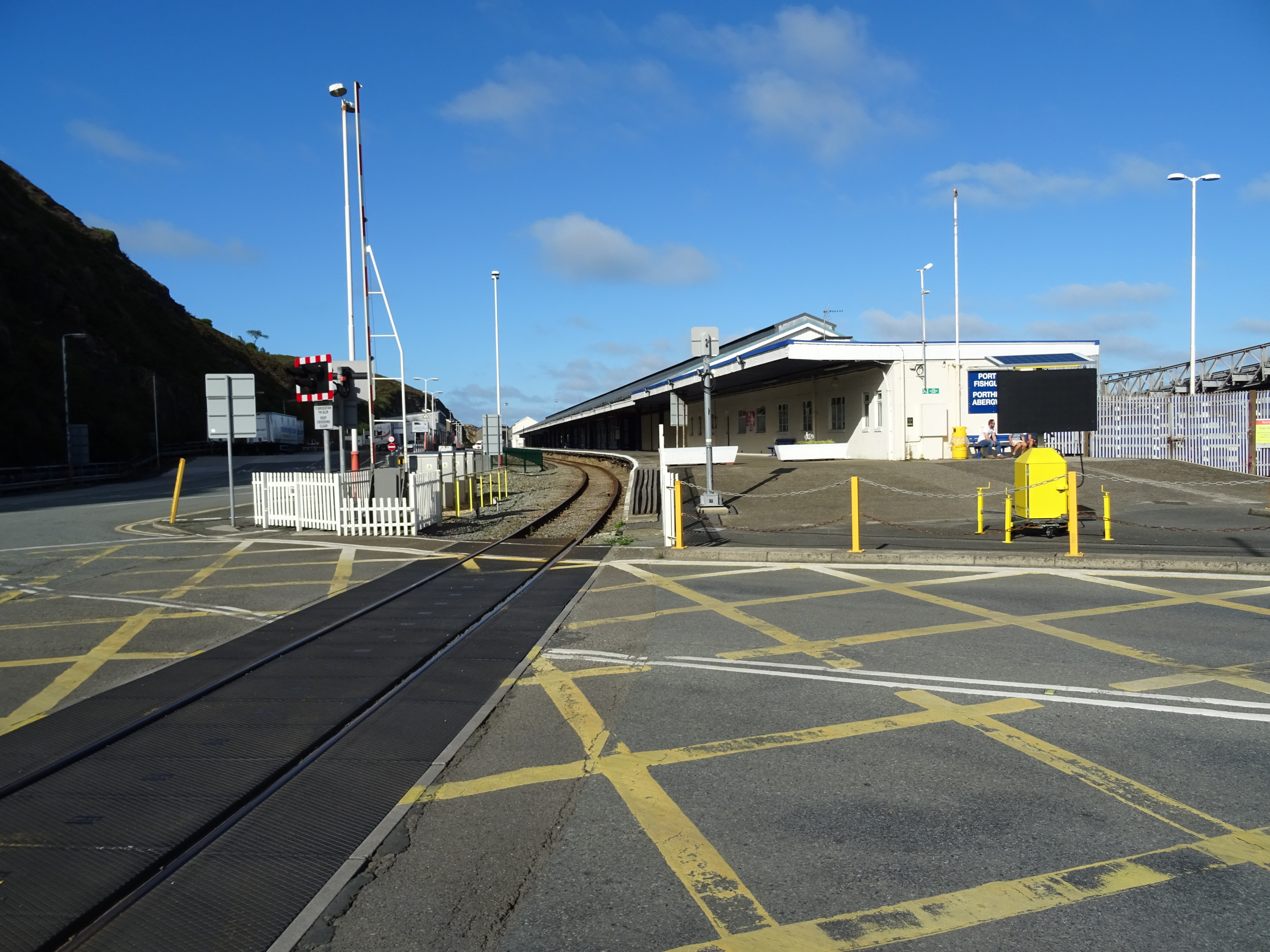
The station from the south in 2022, with the run-around loop removed

Unusually, the station is not owned by Network Rail, but by Stena Line. A large part of the station is contained within the port building, where there are seating and toilets. However, there are no railway ticket machines and the station is staffed only by Stena Line personnel; no rail staff are employed there; there is no rail ticket office.

Most passengers using the station have SailRail tickets issued at Rosslare Europort or another station in Ireland. Other passengers travelling from Fishguard by train must purchase their tickets on board their train, at a different station, or online. The station has step-free access throughout and the station's owners, Stena Line, permit smoking on the platform. The station also has both long and short stay parking. When bus replacement services are operating, the buses leave from the car park adjacent to the level crossing.

After the ban on smoking in public became law in Wales in April 2007, the station became the only one in the UK where it was still permitted. Stena Line allowed passengers to continue to smoke on the platform because it was deemed too dangerous for them to smoke, at the nearest point where it was technically permissible: a level crossing over a busy road. Smoking is banned at all stations operated by Network Rail.

== Services ==
Since the station is located in the harbour, its primary purpose has always been providing links with sea going transport. As such, there have always been daily services to and from Fishguard Harbour which coincide with the ferry services to Rosslare Europort.

Transport for Wales operates the following service on Monday to Saturdays, in trains per day (tpd):

- 1 tpd to Clarbeston Road, which connects with the Milford Haven to Manchester Piccadilly service
- 4 tpd to Carmarthen
- 1 tpd to Cardiff Central
- 1 tpd to Manchester Piccadilly.

Since the ferry timetable changed in Summer 2023, there is no longer a railway connection from the evening ferry arrival; the train departs before the ferry arrives.

Preceding station	National Rail	Following station
Fishguard and Goodwick	Transport for Wales; West Wales line	Terminus
	Ferry services	
Terminus	Stena Line; Ferry	Rosslare Europort
