= Clarbeston Road railway station =

Railway station in Pembrokeshire, Wales

Clarbeston Road
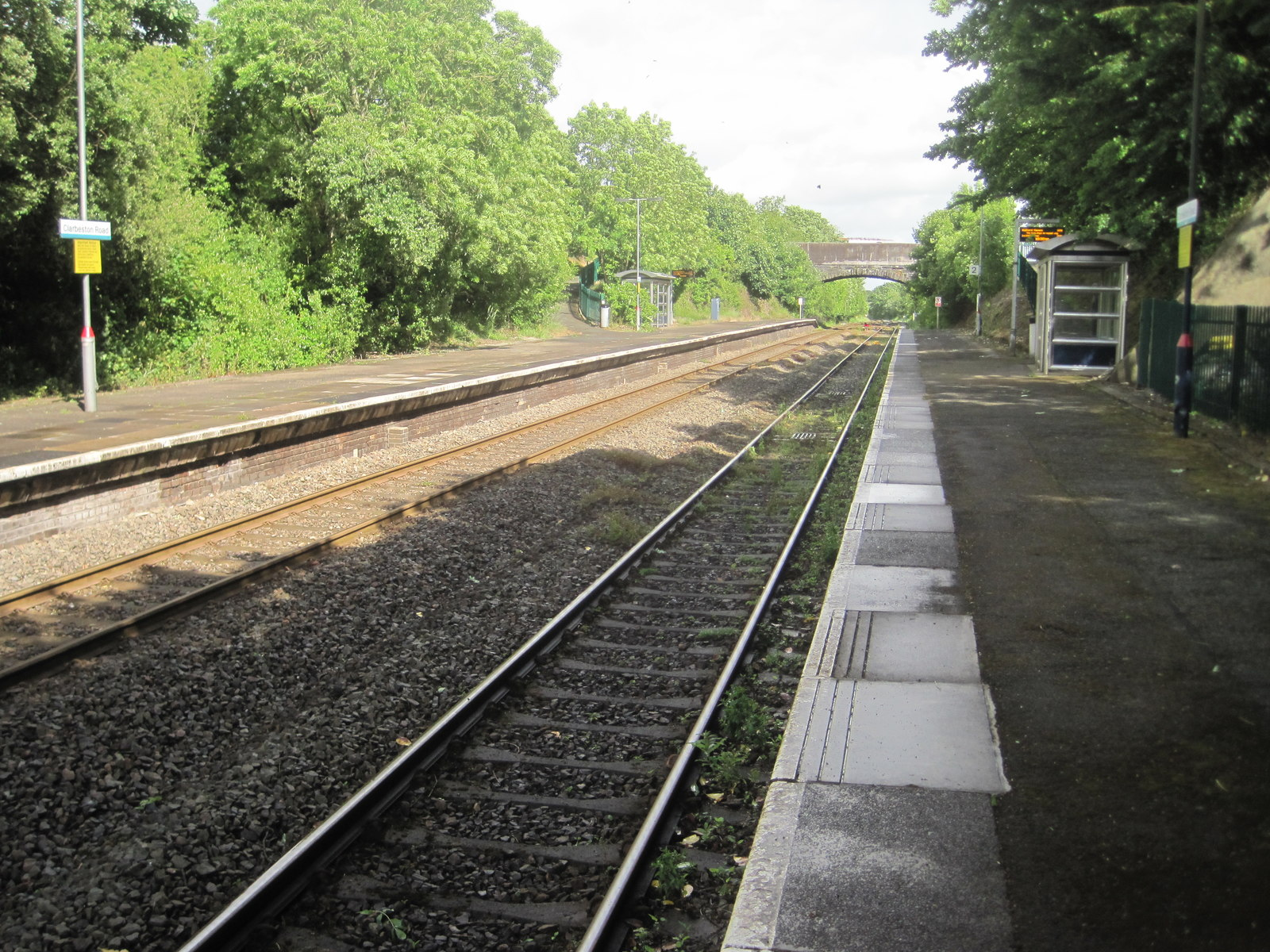
- Clarbeston Road railway station in June 2017

General information
- Location: Clarbeston Road, Pembrokeshire; Wales
- Coordinates: 51.852°N 4.884°W
- Grid reference: SN015209
- Owner: Network Rail
- Manager: Transport for Wales
- Platforms: 2

Other information
- Station code: CLR
- Classification: DfT category F2

History
- Original company: South Wales Railway
- Pre-grouping: Great Western Railway
- Post-grouping: Great Western Railway

Key dates
- 2 January 1854: Station opened as Clarbeston
- 30 August 1906: Renamed Clarbeston Road

Passengers
- 2021/22: ▲4,660
- 2022/23: ▲6,366
- 2023/24: ▲7,556
- 2024/25: ▲7,670
- 2025/26: ▲9,042
Location
Notes
- Passenger statistics from the Office of Rail & Road

Clarbeston Road railway station serves villages such as Clarbeston Road, Clarbeston, Wiston, Walton East and Crundale in Pembrokeshire, Wales. The station, originally named Clarbeston, was opened by the South Wales Railway on 2 January 1854.

== History ==
A direct route to Fishguard Harbour – the Clarbeston Road and Letterston Railway (CR&LR) – was opened by the Great Western Railway on 30 August 1906, and the station at Clarbeston was renamed Clarbeston Road. As part of the CR&LR works, a number of improvements were made to the west of the station for the anticipated increase in goods traffic, but the passenger facilities were not altered because it was intended that Clunderwen would continue to serve as the junction station.

The signal box west of the station now supervises not only the junction between the two routes but also both branches to their respective termini, all of the other boxes on both lines having been closed as part of a 1988 re-signalling scheme that saw control centralised here and colour light signals replace the surviving semaphores.

== Facilities ==
Clarbeston Road is an unstaffed station, with shelters, timetable posters and digital information screens on each platform; there is also a customer help point on platform 2 and a public telephone near platform 1. The platforms are linked via ramps from the adjacent road bridge (so are accessible for disabled passengers, though the eastbound ramp is quite steep and care must be taken when using it). Trains stop here by request only.

== Services ==
The usual service pattern is one train every two hours in each direction, westwards to Milford Haven and eastwards to Manchester Piccadilly via Swansea and Cardiff Central. The branch line to/from Fishguard Harbour diverges here with six direct services each way – three morning, two evening, one night – calling at the station each day Monday to Saturday. There is no direct service on Sundays. While the station serves as a request stop to/from Milford Haven, trains to/from Fishguard Harbour stop here normally.

InterCity 125 services ran through Clarbeston Road to Milford Haven until the early 1990s, ceasing in 1994.

Preceding station	National Rail	Following station
Clunderwen	Transport for Wales; West Wales line Milford Haven branch	Haverfordwest
Clunderwen	Transport for Wales; West Wales line Fishguard branch	Fishguard & Goodwick
	Historical railways	
Clunderwen; Line & station open	Great Western Railway; Clarbeston Road and Letterston Railway	Wolf's Castle Halt; Line open, station closed
