= Fishguard and Goodwick railway station =

Railway station in Pembrokeshire, Wales

Fishguard and Goodwick Welsh: Abergwaun ac Wdig
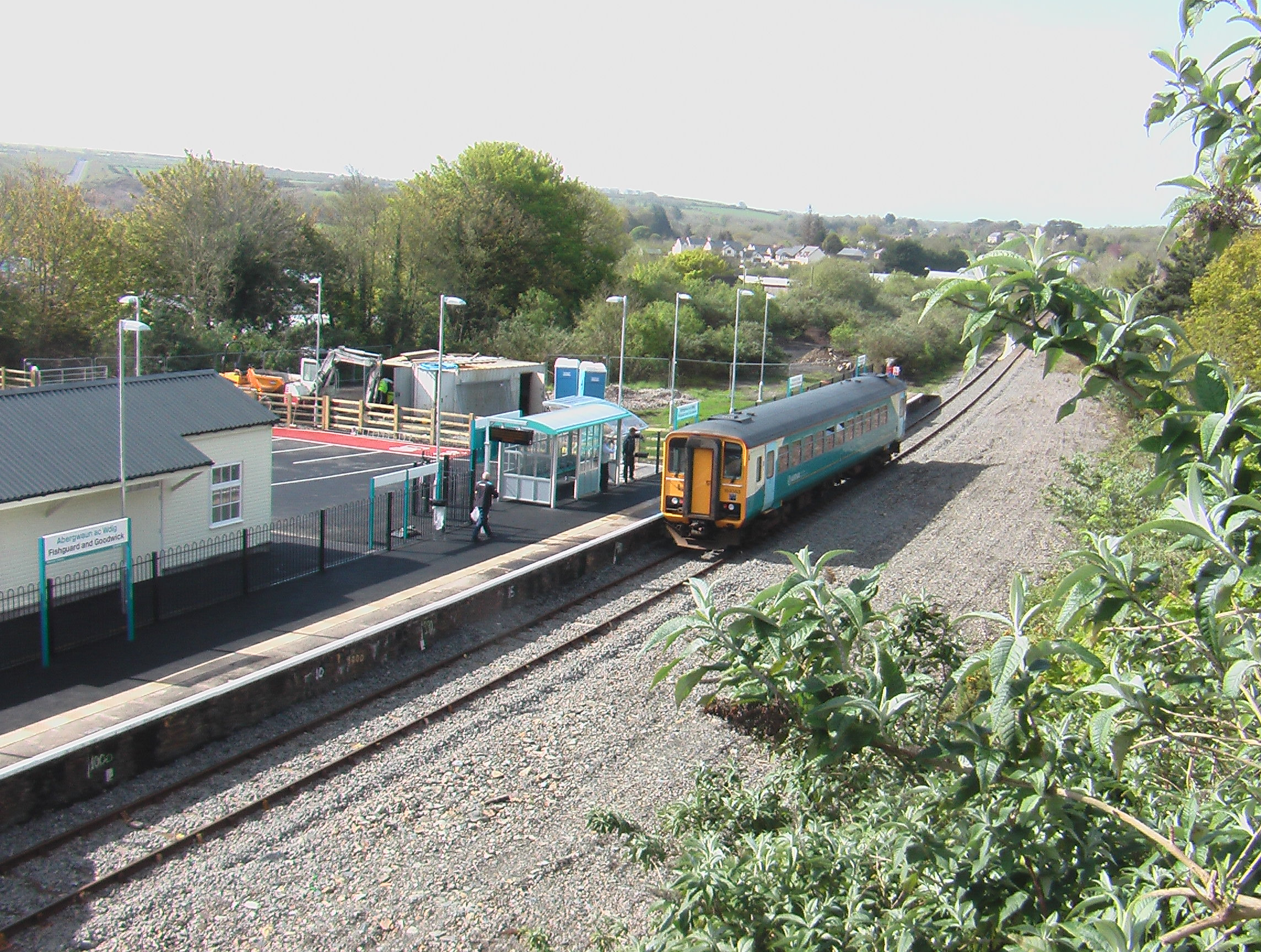
- Fishguard & Goodwick on its reopening 14 May 2012; The 09:56 Fishguard Harbour to Carmarthen service Class 153 Sprinter unit

General information
- Location: Goodwick, Pembrokeshire; Wales
- Coordinates: 52.0035°N 4.9948°W
- Grid reference: SM945381
- Owner: Pembrokeshire County Council
- Manager: Transport for Wales
- Platforms: 1

Other information
- Station code: FGW

History
- Original company: Great Western Railway
- Pre-grouping: Great Western Railway
- Post-grouping: Great Western Railway

Key dates
- 1 August 1899: Opened as Goodwick
- 1 May 1904: Renamed Fishguard and Goodwick
- 6 April 1964: Regular services ceased
- 3 August 1964: all passenger trains ceased
- 18 June 1965: Reopened for Motorail services only
- 19 September 1980: Closed to Regular Motorail services
- 16 September 1982: Closed Completely
- 14 May 2012: Reopened for passenger services

Passengers
- 2021/22: ▲6,152
- 2022/23: ▲13,442
- 2023/24: ▲16,594
- 2024/25: ▲18,262
- 2025/26: ▲23,648
Location
Notes
- Passenger statistics from the Office of Rail and Road

Fishguard and Goodwick railway station is a railway station sited 1 mile from Fishguard in the neighbouring town of Goodwick, Pembrokeshire, Wales. It is owned by Pembrokeshire County Council and just over 1/2 mile (0.80 km) from the larger Fishguard Harbour station. Following its closure in 1964 (1980 for Motorail), it reopened on 14 May 2012 following investment from Network Rail and Pembrokeshire County Council.

== History ==
=== Construction of the line ===
The station was the planned terminus of the Rosebush and Fishguard Railway. Complications meant that, despite work having begun at Rosebush in 1878, the line was not completed by 1898 when the company (now called the North Pembrokeshire and Fishguard Railway) was purchased by the Great Western Railway Company. It is likely that this takeover was prompted by the North Pembrokeshire & Fishguard Railway's plans for a harbour at Goodwick to attract Irish traffic (the GWR had a major such port at Neyland) and/or their ambitious plan to link this new harbour to Carmarthen with their own line to break the GWR's monopoly of rail lines into west Wales.

=== Early years ===
Goodwick station opened on 1 August 1899 under GWR ownership. The station was called Goodwick until 1 May 1904 when it was renamed Fishguard and Goodwick. It was a terminus until the GWR opened their extension to Fishguard Harbour in 1906 and moved their Irish ferry operation there from Neyland.

=== Closure and subsequent usage ===
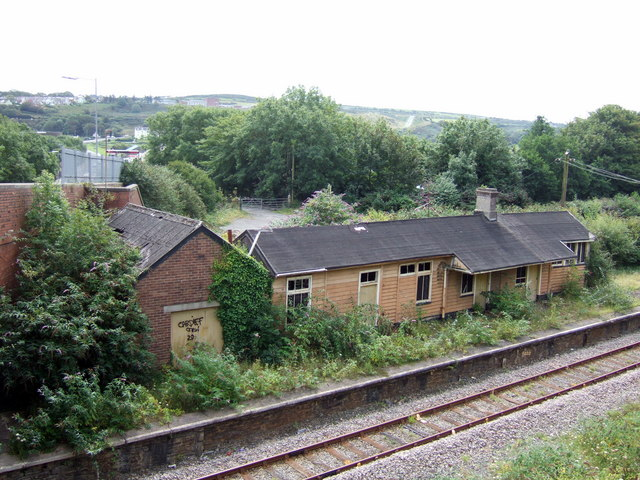
The overgrown and derelict state of the station (2007)

The station was closed on 6 April 1964 by British Railways, when local trains between Fishguard and Clarbeston Road were withdrawn. After closure to normal passenger trains the station remained in use for workmen's trains to the RNAD Trecwn, until these services were withdrawn on 1 August 1964.

From 18 June 1965 the station became the terminus of a seasonal motorail service from London, the end loading dock behind the former main (Up side) platform being used for unloading the cars. Early photographs show the station building to be shorter than it is today, with the extension carried out along with refurbishment for motorail traffic. Motorail kept the station in use each summer season until the regular service ended on 19 September 1980 and the occasional peak service on 16 September 1982.

The station was used temporarily in June 1982, when the railway lines at Fishguard Harbour were moved and re-laid. InterCity 125 services ran through the site of station until the early 1990s but services ceased in 1994.

== Reopening ==
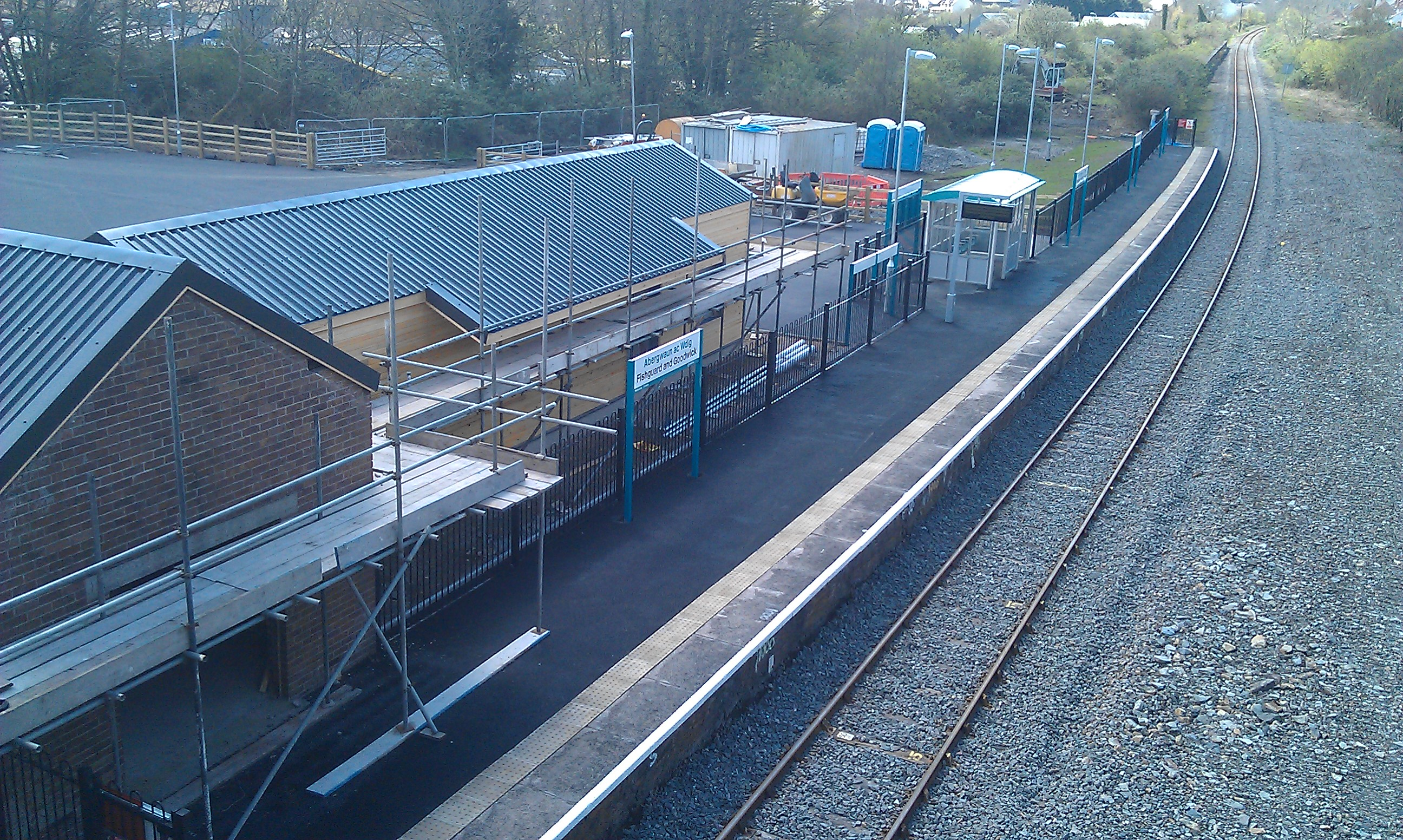
The new Fishguard and Goodwick Railway station under construction (2012)

Reopening Fishguard and Goodwick as a rail/bus interchange had been considered by Pembrokeshire County Council for some years. For this reason it purchased the (disused) station site. In March 2011, it was announced that Welsh Assembly Government subsidy would be provided to allow an increase in train frequency on the Fishguard line from two trains per day to seven from 12 September 2011 for three years. This prompted a search for funding to reopen Fishguard & Goodwick railway station; funding was successfully found and it was announced that the station was to reopen in March 2012.

The reopening work cost £325,000, including realignment of the track by Network Rail by the end of 2011 and laying of tarmac over part of the station yard to provide a car park (with further tarmac over the rest of the station yard, to enlarge the car park, a future possibility). Another aspect of the work was demolition and reconstruction of the station building, which took place in August 2011 between the announcement of extra services and their launch (on 12 September).

The work to reopen the station was a joint operation between Pembrokeshire County Council and Network Rail. In March 2012, Network Rail announced that the station would reopen on 14 May 2012 and would be served by the seven trains each way per day which currently run through the station. The station duly reopened on 14 May 2012. It was adopted under Arriva's adopt-a-station scheme by the local community group POINT.

== Services ==
=== 2018 ===
In the 2018 timetable, there were seven daily (Mon-Sat) departures each way on a very irregular schedule (particularly in the afternoon, where there were no departures either way for more than six hours). Six of the services ran to at least Carmarthen, with one through train to Manchester Piccadilly one to Cardiff Central and one to Swansea. The other departure ran to Clarbeston Road, where it connected into a Milford Haven to Manchester Piccadilly train. On Sundays, there were three trains each way, ran primarily to serve the ferry to/from Rosslare. Two of these ran to Swansea and the other to Cardiff Central.

=== 2021 ===
Due to the COVID-19 pandemic, services on the Fishguard branch were reduced. As of August 2021, there were two daily departures from Mondays to Saturdays in each direction – one at midday, and one in the late evening. The two westbound services continued to Fishguard Harbour. The two eastbound services ran to Carmarthen, with the midday service continuing to Cardiff Central.

On Sundays, there was an increased service of three trains per day in each direction. The additional mid-afternoon services ran to Fishguard Harbour and Swansea.

=== c.2022 onward ===
As of 2024, the Fishguard branch has six services from Mondays to Saturdays and three services on Sundays. All westbound services continue to Fishguard Harbour. One eastbound service terminates at Clarbeston Road, connecting with the Milford Haven to Manchester Piccadilly train, and the others continue to Carmarthen, Swansea or Cardiff Central.

Preceding station	National Rail	Following station
Clarbeston Road	Transport for Wales; West Wales line Fishguard branch	Fishguard Harbour
	Historical railways	
Jordanston Halt; Line open, station closed	Great Western Railway; North Pembrokeshire and Fishguard Railway	Fishguard Harbour; Line and station open
