= Walton East =

Village and parish in Pembrokeshire, Wales

Coordinates: 51.87°N 4.87°W

Walton East: Welsh: Waltwn
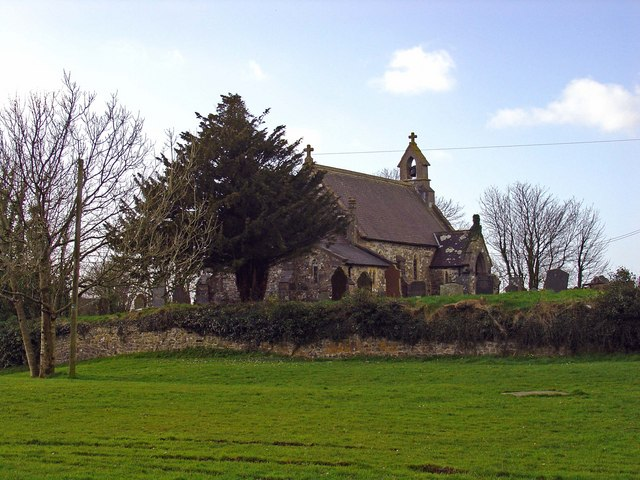
- St Mary's Church

- Location within Pembrokeshire
- Population: 250 +
- OS grid reference: SN020236
- Principal area: Pembrokeshire
- Preserved county: Dyfed
- Country: Wales
- Sovereign state: United Kingdom
- Post town: CLARBESTON ROAD
- Postcode district: SA63
- Dialling code: 01437
- Police: Dyfed-Powys
- Fire: Mid and West Wales
- Ambulance: Welsh
- UK Parliament: Preseli Pembrokeshire

Walton East (Welsh: Waltwn) is a small rural village and parish established around a church at least as early as Norman times. It is 2 miles (3.2 km) southwest of Llys y Fran and 1 1/2 miles (2.4 km) north of Clarbeston Road and in Wiston community in Pembrokeshire, Wales.

== History ==
Walton East, in the 12th century, was part of the possessions of the commandery of the Knights of St. John of Jerusalem at Slebech, given by its Norman owner, Walter de Wale, thus its name: "Wale's town", or Walton.

It is marked as just Walton on a 1578 parish map of Pembrokeshire. Until the 16th century, the parish was in the hundred of Dungleddy in Pembrokeshire, southwest Wales. Owen in 1602 placed it on the English side of the language boundary, but by the 19th and 20th centuries it was a mainly Welsh-speaking community. In the 1870s, the parish extended to 1,893 acres (766 ha) with a population of 223 in 40 houses. In 1875, a Welsh Calvinist Methodist Chapel was built in the village.

In the southwest of the parish is Penty Park, former home of members of the Philipps family; there are two listed buildings in the park. Estate records from 1590 to 1916 are held by the National Library of Wales. A pre-1850 parish map shows little settlement outside Walton East village, but shows Walton West a short distance away. In the 1830s there were some 230 inhabitants. The population declined steadily over the next 150 years to 150 in 1961.

A map made at the turn of the 20th century shows several farms butting up to the village, several other dwellings and a smithy, as well as church and chapel, and several springs.

== Parish church ==
The parish church, dedicated to St Mary the Virgin, has no tower or spire. The present church was built 1849 to 1852, and the Royal Commission on Historical Monuments (RCAHMW) describes the church:

Constructed of Preseli dolerite with grey limestone dressings under slate roofs, the church consists of nave, chancel, bellcote, gabled north-west porch and lean-to north-east vestry. The design uses Decorated tracery to the east and west windows and overdone buttressing. The interior is bleakly cemented, including the chancel arch. Fittings include a twelfth-century font with square bowl, scalloped and tapered below. Stained glass, in all windows (unusually), is mostly by C.C.Powell after 1938 & 1945, but includes work by Celtic Studios (1967).

The parish is now one of 13 in the present combined parish of Daugleddau, in the Church in Wales Diocese of St Davids.
