= Welsh Hook Halt railway station =

Disused railway station in Welsh Hook, Pembrokeshire

Welsh Hook Halt
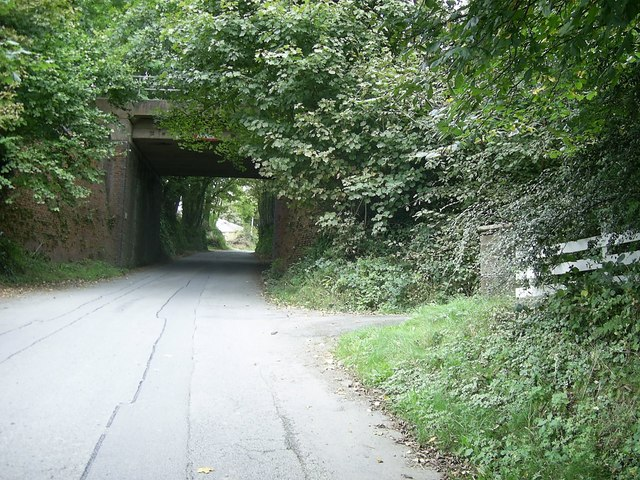
- The railway bridge in 2009

General information
- Location: Welsh Hook, Pembrokeshire; Wales
- Coordinates: 51.9094°N 5.005°W
- Grid reference: SM934277
- Platforms: 2

Other information
- Status: Disused

History
- Original company: Great Western Railway
- Post-grouping: Great Western Railway

Key dates
- 5 May 1924: Opened
- 6 April 1964: Closed
Location

Welsh Hook Halt railway station served the hamlet of Welsh Hook, Pembrokeshire, Wales, from 1924 to 1964 on the Clarbeston Road and Letterston Railway.

== History ==
The station was opened on 5 May 1924 by the Great Western Railway. Passengers had to stick their hand out at the platform if they wanted to board the train. They also stopped during daylight hours only. The station closed on 6 April 1964.

| Preceding station | Historical railways | Following station |
|---|---|---|
| Mathry Road Halt; Line open, station closed | Great Western Railway; Clarbeston Road and Letterston Railway | Wolf's Castle Halt; Line open, station closed |
