= Haverfordwest railway station =

Railway station in Pembrokeshire, Wales

Haverfordwest Welsh: Hwlffordd
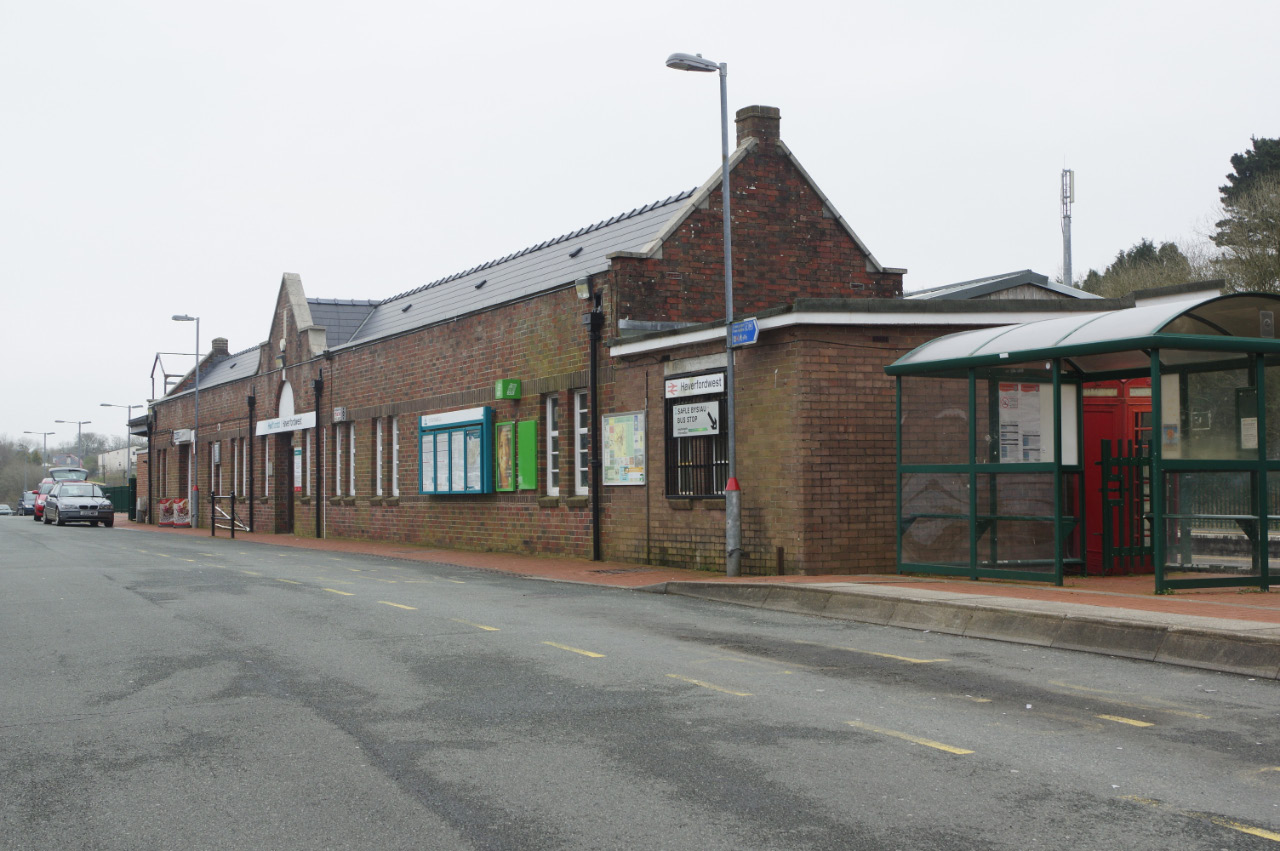
- Haverfordwest railway station

General information
- Location: Haverfordwest, Pembrokeshire; Wales
- Coordinates: 51.803°N 4.960°W
- Grid reference: SM960157
- Managed by: Transport for Wales
- Platforms: 2

Other information
- Station code: HVF
- Classification: DfT category D

History
- Original company: South Wales Railway
- Pre-grouping: Great Western Railway
- Post-grouping: Great Western Railway

Key dates
- 2 January 1854: Station opened

Passengers
- 2020/21: ▼22,486
- 2021/22: ▲85,066
- 2022/23: ▲97,866
- 2023/24: ▲0.104 million
- 2024/25: ▲0.113 million
Location
Notes
- Passenger statistics from the Office of Rail and Road

Haverfordwest railway station serves the town of Haverfordwest in Pembrokeshire, Wales. It is 63 miles (101 km) west of Swansea on the Milford Haven branch of the West Wales line.

Whilst the station has two platforms (as the site of the only passing loop on this section), most trains use platform one as it is adjacent to the entrance and ticket office. The line through the station was double track until 1988 and the station had its own signal box, but this closed when the branch from Clarbeston Road was singled and re-signalled in September of that year; the entire route is now worked under track circuit block regulations from the box at the latter station.

== Facilities ==
The station is staffed during the daytime (07:00 – 13:30, Mondays to Saturdays only) and has toilet facilities, a newspaper kiosk, ticket office and a station buffet on platform one. For times when the station building is closed, an automated ticket kiosk allows passengers to buy tickets with a debit or credit card, or to collect tickets from purchases made online. Train running information is provided by digital CIS displays, timetable posters and telephone. Step-free access is only possible to platform one, as the only route to platform two is via a stepped footbridge.

A bus stop outside the station allows interchanges with services to St Davids, Fishguard and Cardigan, as well as a direct service to Aberystwyth. There is also a Taxi rank directly outside the station.

== Services ==
The usual service pattern is one train every two hours in each direction: southwards to Milford Haven; and east/northwards to Manchester Piccadilly via Swansea, Cardiff Central and Hereford. InterCity 125 services stopped at Haverfordwest until the early 1990s, terminating in 1994.

Preceding station	National Rail	Following station
Clarbeston Road	Transport for Wales; West Wales line	Johnston

== Awards ==
Haverfordwest railway station has received a number of awards, including Anglo-Irish Best Station Awards in 1991 and 1992. The station was refurbished in 2002 and officially re-opened on 25 April 2002.
