= Neyland railway station =

Former railway station in Wales

Neyland
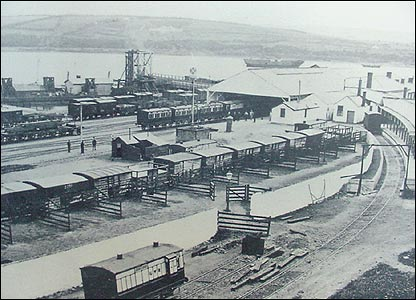
- Neyland Station and Goods Yard, ca. 1880

General information
- Location: Neyland, Pembrokeshire; Wales
- Coordinates: 51.7055°N 4.9430°W
- Grid reference: SM967048

Other information
- Status: Disused

History
- Original company: South Wales Railway
- Pre-grouping: Great Western Railway
- Post-grouping: GWR

Key dates
- 15 April 1856: Opened as Milford Haven
- February 1859: Renamed Neyland
- November 1859: Renamed New Milford
- 1 September 1906: Renamed Neyland
- 2 December 1963: Goods facilities withdrawn
- 15 June 1964: Closed to passengers
Location

Neyland railway station was on the north bank of the Milford Haven Waterway in Pembrokeshire, Wales.

== History ==
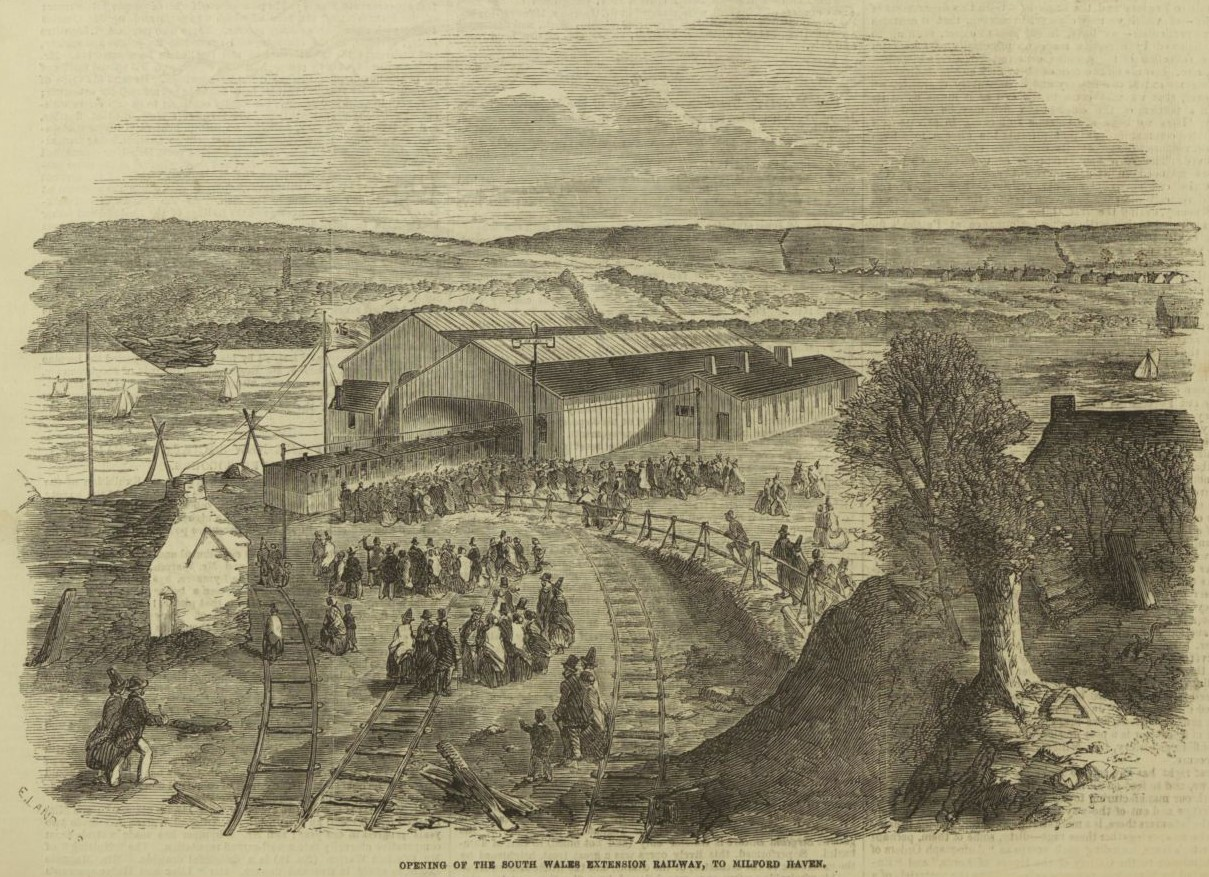
Neyland Railway Station, in 1856. Illustrated London News, Ebenezer Landells

The Great Western Railway (GWR) was established under the vision of Isambard Kingdom Brunel, to link London to North America on the quickest possible route, with steamships landing passengers and goods in West Wales as opposed to steaming to an English port. Further, such a port link could also provide quicker access to Ireland.

To achieve this, the GWR supported the South Wales Railway (SWR), which would run from Gloucester to a port in west Wales. Brunel, the GWR's chief engineer, originally proposed to situate the Welsh port at Fishguard, which was intended to be the terminus when the line was authorised in 1845. But in 1852, under extensive shareholder pressure to deliver revenue, Brunel changed his mind in favour of Neyland, because it was sheltered and had deep water to allow large ships to dock.

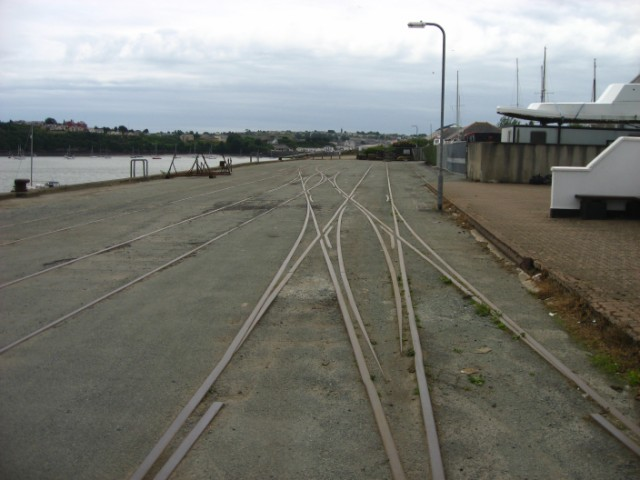
Site of Neyland Station in 2008, Cleddau Estuary to the left

The SWR was opened in stages, and reached Haverfordwest on 2 January 1854; the last section from there to the new port, authorised by the South Wales Railway Act 1852 (15 & 16 Vict. c. cxvii) and named the Neyland Extension Railway, was opened on 15 April 1856.

A Railway to commence from and out of the Line of the Branch Railway to Haverfordwest as authorized to be constructed by "The South Wales Railway Amendment Act, 1846," in a certain Field numbered on the Plans referred to in the same Act 35 in the Parish of Uzmaston in the County of Pembroke, and to terminate on the North Side of Milford Haven at a Point about One hundred and fifty Yards South-east of the South-eastern Corner of a Quay or Wharf situate at the Extremity of Neyland Point in the Parish of Lanstadwell in the same County. — Section 5, South Wales Railway Act 1852 (15 & 16 Vict. c. cxvii)

The western terminus of the SWR, a station originally named Milford Haven, was opened with the line on 15 April 1856. Very soon there was a twice-weekly steamboat service to Waterford. The station was renamed Neyland in February 1859, but was renamed again in November that year, becoming New Milford; it was shown as New Milford (Milford Haven) in some timetables.

On 1 September 1906, the station was again renamed Neyland. This followed the opening on 30 August 1906 of the new harbour at Fishguard, the associated railway station, the Clarbeston Road and Letterston Railway giving a shorter route to Fishguard from Clarbeston Road and the transfer to Fishguard of the steamship service to Waterford. Neyland then rapidly declined in importance.

Goods facilities were withdrawn on 2 December 1963 and the station closed to passenger traffic on 15 June 1964. The Pembrokeshire Light Railway Society was launched in 1986 in an unsuccessful attempt to re-open the section of the line from Johnston to Neyland.

== Routes ==
Preceding station	Disused railways	Following station
Johnston; Line closed, station open	Great Western Railway; South Wales Railway	Terminus
