= Manorbier =

Village, parish and community in Pembrokeshire, Wales

Manorbier: Welsh: Maenorbŷr
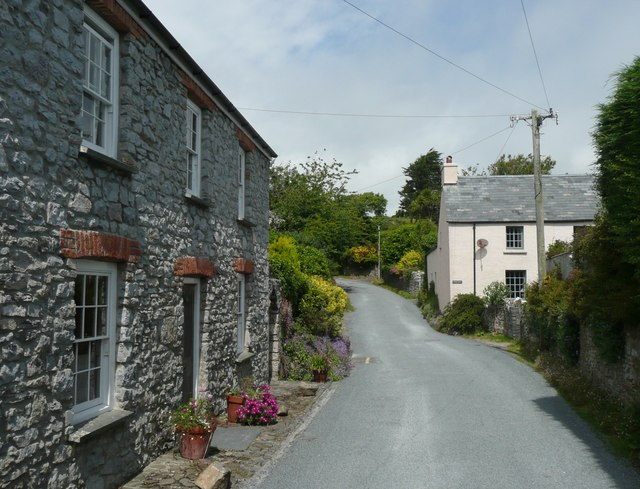
- The Village Street

- Location within Pembrokeshire
- Population: 1,327 (2011)
- Community: Manorbier
- Principal area: Pembrokeshire
- Preserved county: Dyfed
- Country: Wales
- Sovereign state: United Kingdom
- Post town: TENBY
- Postcode district: SA70
- Dialling code: 01834
- Police: Dyfed-Powys
- Fire: Mid and West Wales
- Ambulance: Welsh
- UK Parliament: Mid and South Pembrokeshire
- Senedd Cymru – Welsh Parliament: Ceredigion Penfro
- List of places UK Wales Pembrokeshire 51.6459°N 4.7966°W Map of the community

Manorbier (/ˌmænərˈbɪər/; Welsh: Maenorbŷr [mɑɨnɔrˈbɨːr]) is a village, community and parish on the south coast of Pembrokeshire, Wales. The name means the 'Manor of Pŷr'. The community includes Jameston, Lydstep and Manorbier Newton.

An electoral ward with the same name exists. It stretches inland to St Florence and at the 2011 Census, the population was 2,083. The area is served by the West Wales Line stopping at Manorbier railway station.

Manorbier is within the Pembrokeshire Coast National Park and is a popular tourist attraction with Manorbier Castle, St James's Church, the sandy beach, cliffs, and part of the Wales Coast Path.

== History ==
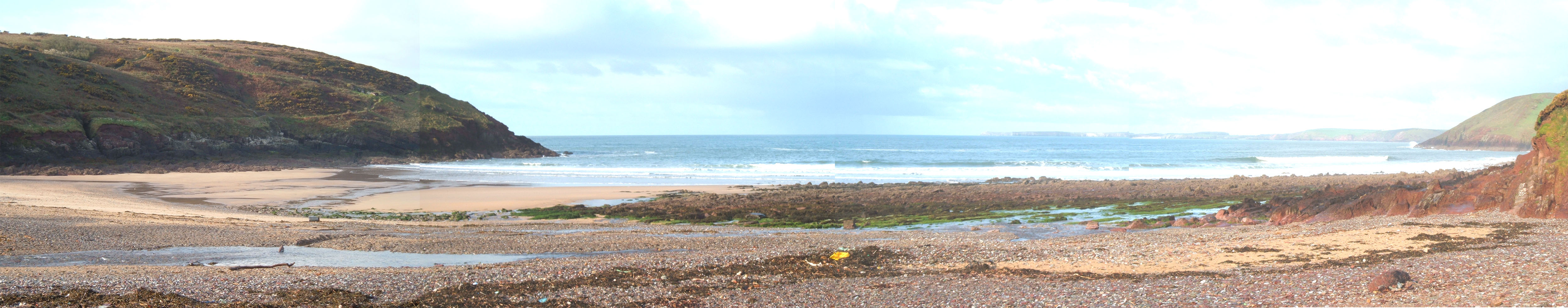
Manorbier beach

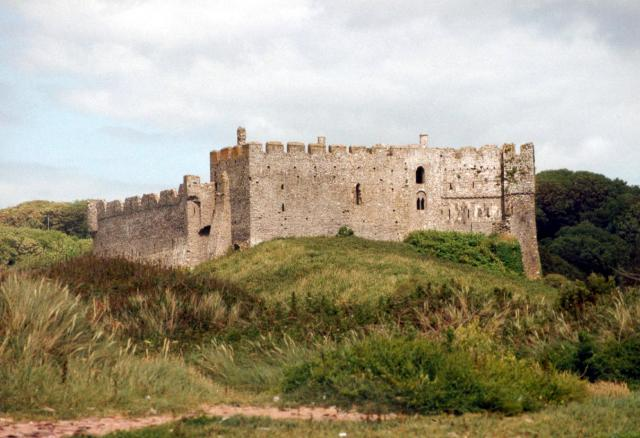
Manorbier Castle

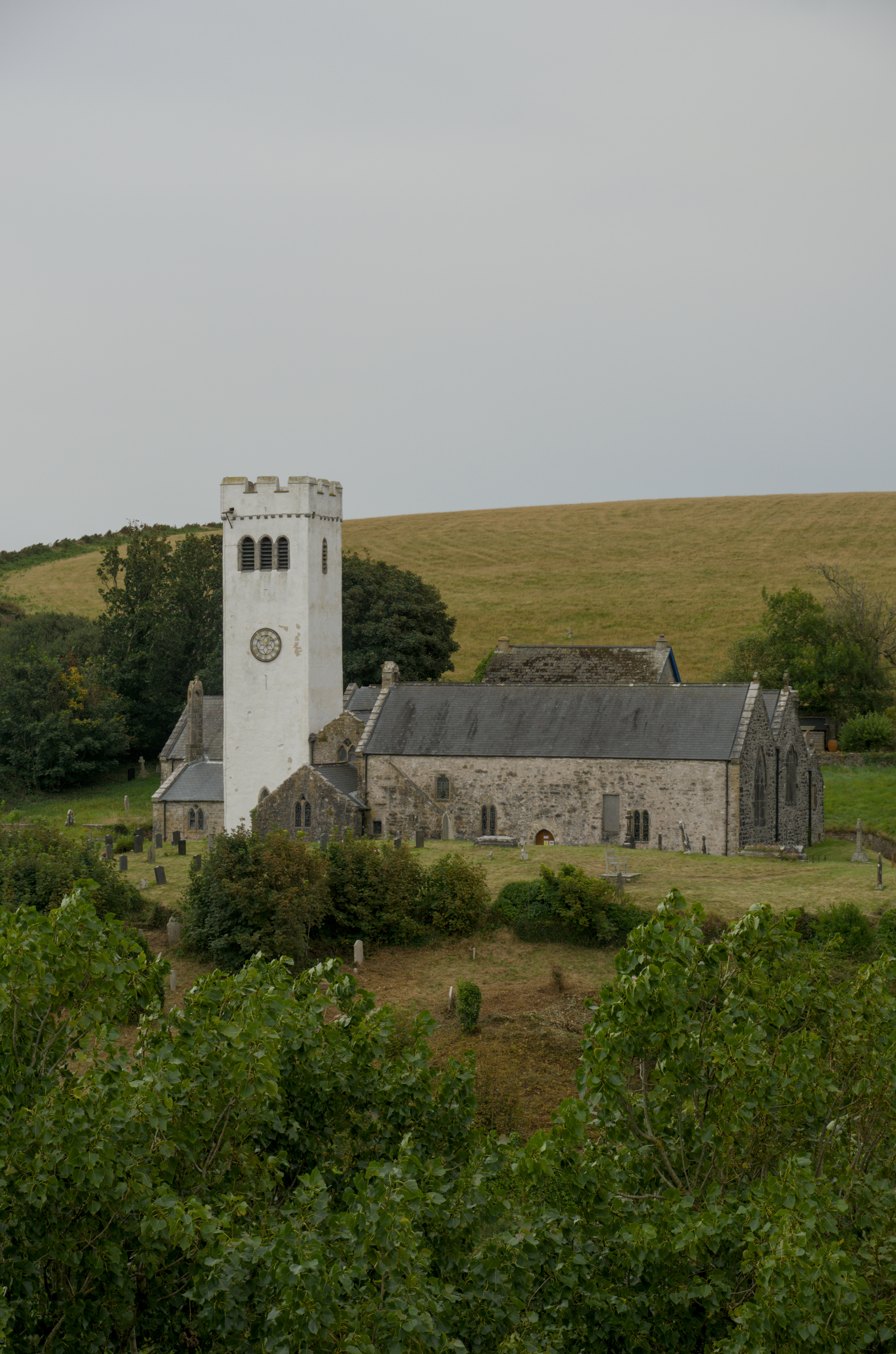
St James's Church, Manorbier

Fossils can be found along the stream bed, although some are of poor quality, and along the cliffs to the side of the beach the rock formations are revealed as vertical beds. The evidence of early human habitation consists of many flint microliths from the Mesolithic and Neolithic ages, housed in local museums. The cromlech known as the King's Quoit is south of Manorbier bay and beach.

Later evidence points to occupation of The Dak with the finding of a perforated mace head as well as Bronze Age burial mounds on the Ridgeway. Fortifications also seem to have been prominent including an Iron Age enclosure near Manorbier station and the site of a multivallate, meaning multiple ditches, promontory fort at Old Castle Head where there are remains of hut platforms within the ditches. A well-restored lime kiln is in Mud Lane behind the castle. To the east of Manorbier, on the side of the road to Lydstep, is an area of strip lynchets dating to early Anglo Saxon times and perhaps as early as the Bronze Age.

The Norman knight Odo de Barri was granted the lands of Manorbier, Penally and Begelly in gratitude for his military help in conquering Pembrokeshire after 1103. The first Manorbier Castle was motte and bailey style, with the stone walls being added in the next century by later Normans.

St James's parish church dates from the 12th century and is a Grade I listed building. A large number of other buildings and structures in the parish are listed.

In late August 1908, the writer Virginia Woolf stayed in Manorbier, during which she worked on her first novel The Voyage Out. Woolf, who visited the village by herself, stayed at Sea View cottage.

From 1933 to 1 September 1946, a mixed civil and military airfield was operational. During World War II it was a Royal Air Force airfield, RAF Manorbier. The site is now a firing range employed by the Royal Artillery as a testing range for high-velocity missiles.

== Notable people ==
- Giraldus Cambrensis (ca. 1146 – ca. 1223), also known as Gerald of Wales, a Cambro-Norman priest, historian and son of William de Barri, was born in the village and called it "the pleasantest place in Wales".

== Railway ==
Manorbier railway station on the Pembroke Dock branch of the West Wales Line is operated by Transport for Wales Rail, who also manage the station. Trains stop here on request every two hours in each direction, westwards to Pembroke Dock and eastwards to Tenby, Whitland, Carmarthen and Swansea.

== Sports ==
Manorbier is home to Manorbier United FC, which plays in the Pembrokeshire League. They played in the league from 1970 until folding partway through the 2017–18 season, but were reformed in 2024 and rejoined the league.

In the 2009–10 season Manorbier Ladies FC competed in the Welsh Premier Women's League. Angharad James-Turner formerly played for the club.

== Twinning ==
Manorbier is twinned with Vernou-la-Celle-sur-Seine, France.
