= Lamphey railway station =

Railway station in Pembrokeshire, Wales

Lamphey Welsh: Llandyfái
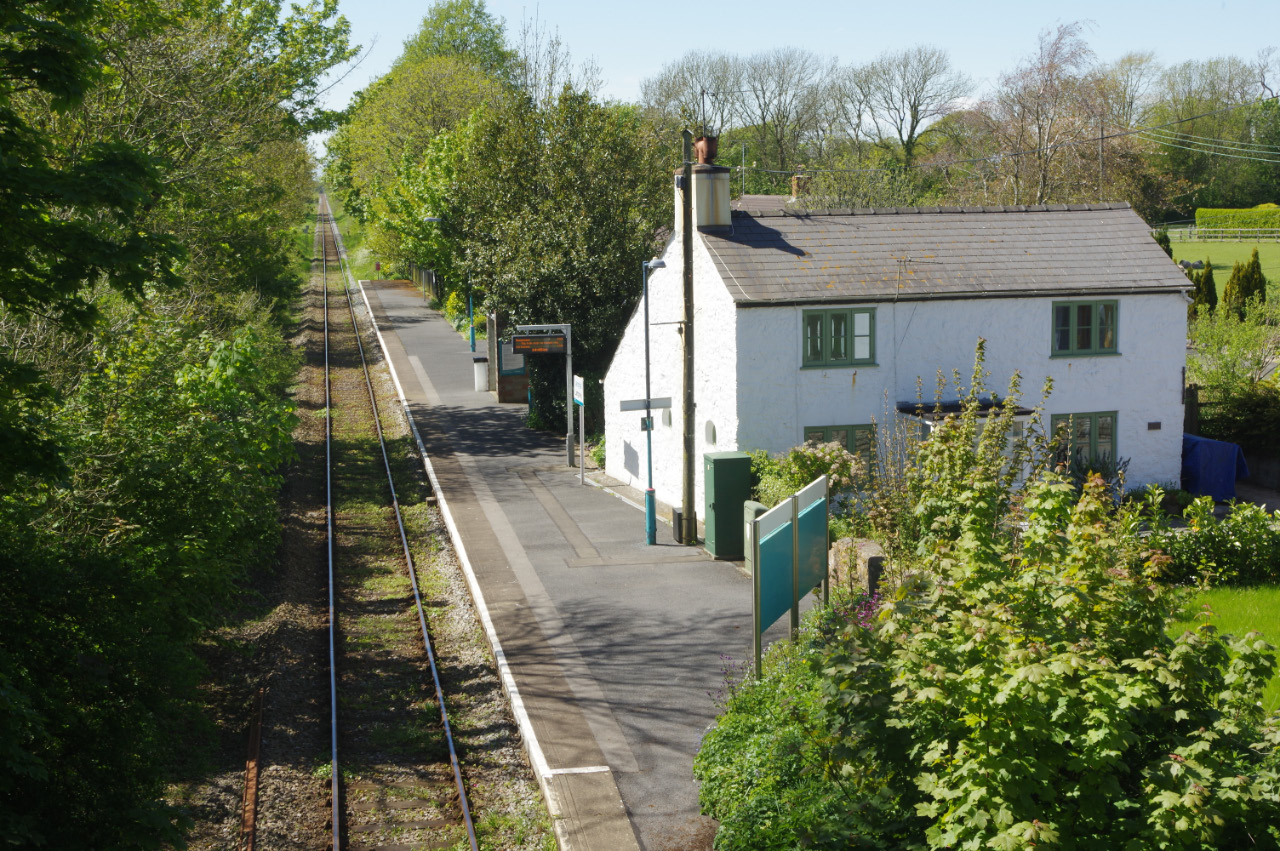

General information
- Location: Lamphey, Pembrokeshire; Wales
- Coordinates: 51.667°N 4.873°W
- Grid reference: SN014003
- Manager: Transport for Wales
- Platforms: 1

Other information
- Station code: LAM
- Classification: DfT category F2

Passengers
- 2021/22: ▲3,128
- 2022/23: ▲3,820
- 2023/24: ▲4,820
- 2024/25: ▲5,862
- 2025/26: ▲6,470
Location
Notes
- Passenger statistics from the Office of Rail and Road

Lamphey railway station is on the Pembroke Dock branch of the West Wales Line, managed by Transport for Wales Rail. Trains, stopping on request, run westwards to Pembroke Dock and eastwards to Tenby, Whitland, Carmarthen and Swansea, approximately every two hours in each direction (less frequently on Sundays).

Preceding station	National Rail	Following station
Manorbier	Transport for Wales; West Wales Line	Pembroke
Manorbier	Great Western Railway; London - Pembroke; Summer period ONLY	Pembroke
