= Golden Hill Platform railway station =

Disused railway station in Golden Hill, Pembrokeshire

Golden Hill Platform

General information
- Location: Golden Hill, Pembrokeshire; Wales
- Coordinates: 51.6806°N 4.9135°W
- Grid reference: SM986020
- Platforms: 1

Other information
- Status: Disused

History
- Original company: Great Western Railway
- Pre-grouping: Great Western Railway
- Post-grouping: Great Western Railway

Key dates
- 1 July 1909: Opened
- 5 February 1940: Closed
Location

Golden Hill Platform railway station served the suburb of Golden Hill, Pembrokeshire, Wales, from 1909 to 1940 on the Pembroke and Tenby Railway.

== History ==
The station was opened on 1 July 1909 by the Great Western Railway. It closed on 5 February 1940.

Preceding station	Historical railways	Following station
Pembroke; Line and station open	Great Western Railway; Pembroke and Tenby Railway	Llanion Halt; Line open, station closed
