= Beaver's Hill Halt railway station =

Disused railway station in Tenby, Pembrokeshire

Beaver's Hill Halt
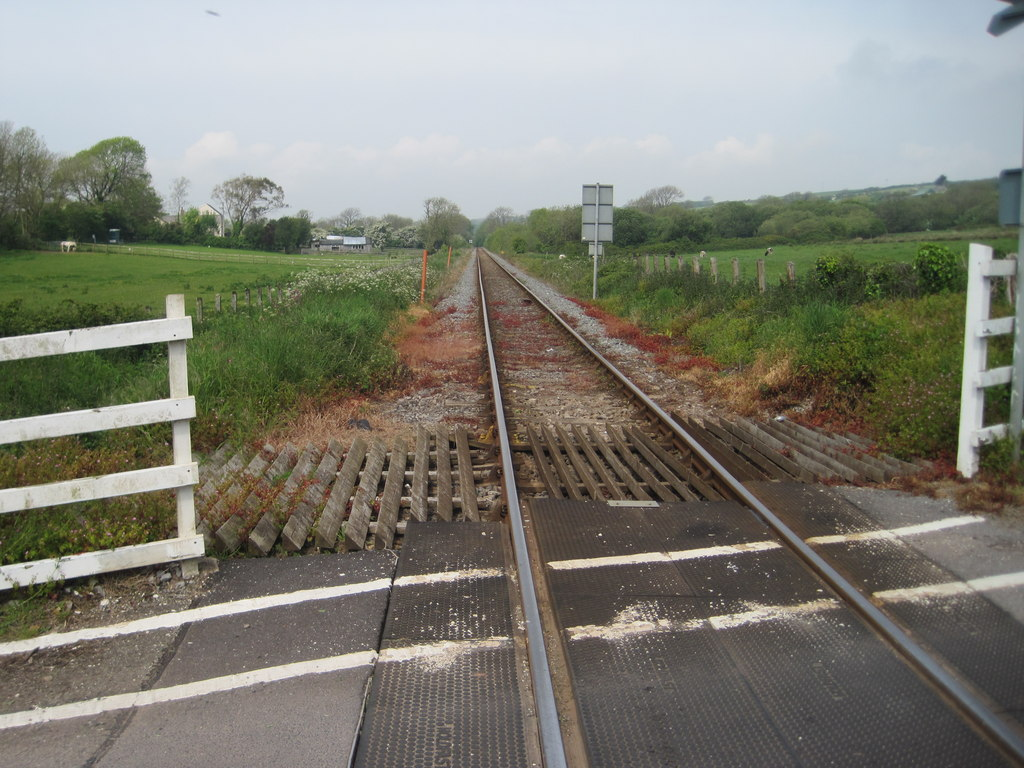
- The site of the station, looking north from the level crossing, in 2014

General information
- Location: Tenby, Pembrokeshire; Wales
- Coordinates: 51.6627°N 4.8118°W
- Grid reference: SS056997
- Platforms: 1

Other information
- Status: Disused

History
- Original company: Great Western Railway
- Pre-grouping: Great Western Railway

Key dates
- 1 May 1905: Opened
- September 1908: Closed for winter
- 22 September 1914: Closed to passengers
- 1 December 1923: Reopened
- 15 June 1964: Closed
Location

Beaver's Hill Halt railway station served the town of Tenby, Pembrokeshire, Wales, from 1905 to 1964 on the Pembroke and Tenby Railway.

== History ==
The station opened on 1 May 1905 by the Great Western Railway. It closed in September 1908 for the winter but it was still used by workmen for Pembroke Dock. It closed again on 22 September 1914 but reopened on 1 December 1923, before closing permanently on 14 June 1964.

Preceding station	Disused railways	Following station
Manorbier; Line and station open	Great Western Railway; Pembroke and Tenby Railway	Lamphey; Line and station open
