= Llanion Halt railway station =

Short-lived railway station in Pembrokeshire, Wales

Llanion Halt

General information
- Location: Llanion, Pembrokeshire; Wales
- Coordinates: 51.6927°N 4.9272°W
- Grid reference: SM977033

Other information
- Status: Disused

History
- Original company: Great Western Railway
- Pre-grouping: Great Western Railway

Key dates
- 1 May 1905: Opened
- 1 October 1908: Closed
Location

Llanion Halt railway station served the suburb of Llanion, Pembrokeshire, Wales, from 1905 to 1908 on the Pembroke and Tenby Railway.

== History ==
The station was opened on 1 May 1905 by the Great Western Railway. It was a short-lived station, only being open for three years before closing on 1 October 1908.

| Preceding station | Historical railways | Following station |
|---|---|---|
| Pembroke; Line and station open | Great Western Railway; Pembroke and Tenby Railway | Pembroke Dock; Line and station open |
