= Manorbier railway station =

Railway station in Pembrokeshire, Wales

Manorbier Welsh: Maenorbŷr
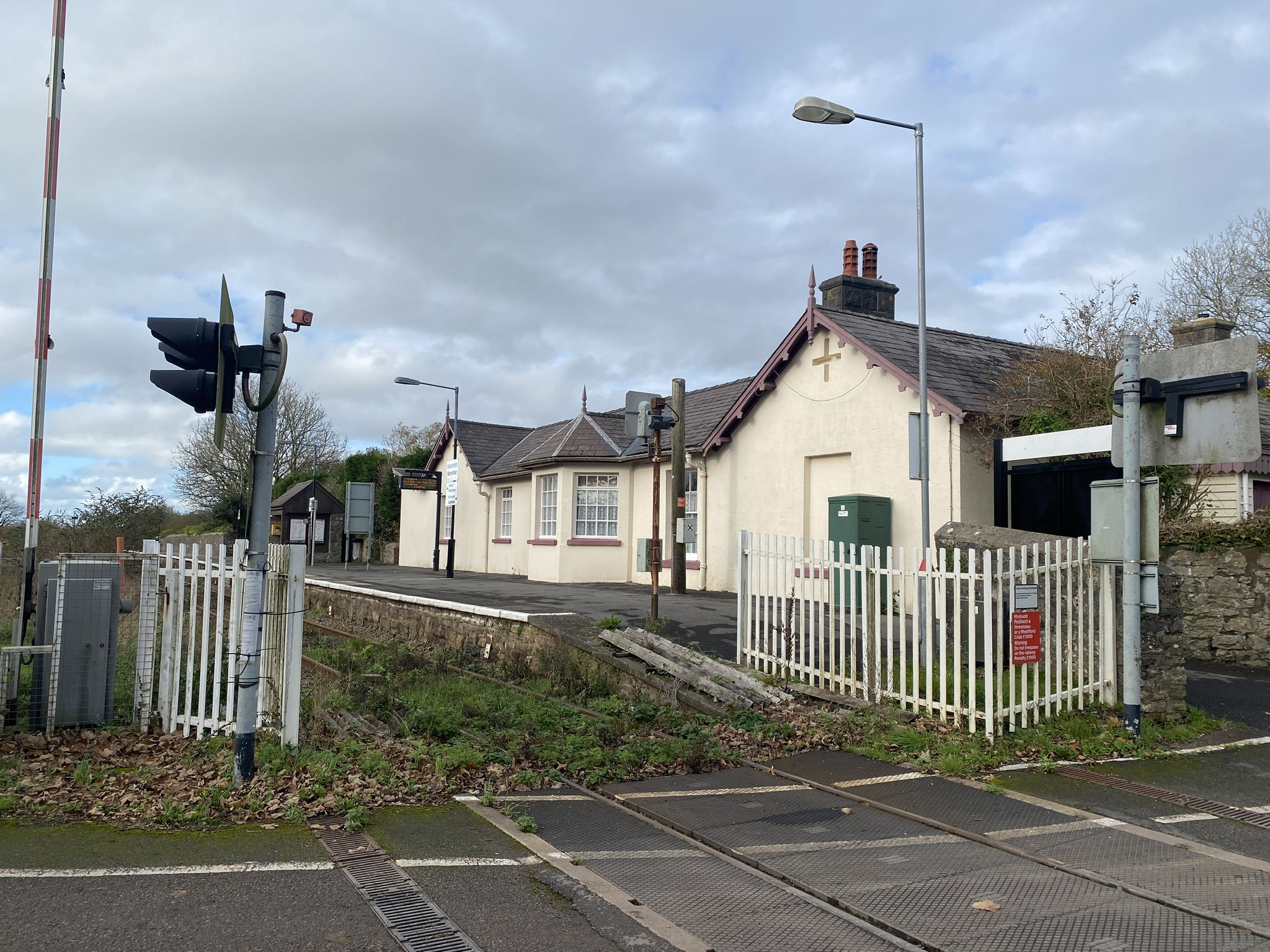

General information
- Location: Manorbier, Pembrokeshire; Wales
- Coordinates: 51.660°N 4.792°W
- Grid reference: SS069994
- Manager: Transport for Wales
- Platforms: 1

Other information
- Station code: MRB
- Classification: DfT category F2

Passengers
- 2021/22: ▲4,704
- 2022/23: ▲6,946
- 2023/24: ▲8,154
- 2024/25: ▲9,896
- 2025/26: ▲10,608

Listed Building – Grade II
- Feature: Former Railway Station
- Designated: 12 March 1996
- Reference no.: 18021
Location
Notes
- Passenger statistics from the Office of Rail and Road

Manorbier railway station is in Pembrokeshire, Wales, on the Pembroke Dock branch of the West Wales Line is operated by Transport for Wales Rail, who also manage the station. It is 1 mile (1.6 km) north of Manorbier in the triangle completed by Jameston and St Florence. Trains stop here on request every two hours in each direction, westwards to Pembroke Dock and eastwards to Tenby, Whitland, Carmarthen and Swansea.

Preceding station	National Rail	Following station
Penally	Transport for Wales; West Wales Line	Lamphey
Penally	Great Western Railway; London - Pembroke	Lamphey or Pembroke
