= Narberth station =

Narberth station may refer to:

- Narberth station (SEPTA), a SEPTA station in Narberth, Pennsylvania, US
- Narberth railway station (Wales), in Narberth, Pembrokeshire, Wales

== See also ==
- Narberth (disambiguation)
