= Penally railway station =

Railway station in Pembrokeshire, Wales

Penally Welsh: Penalun
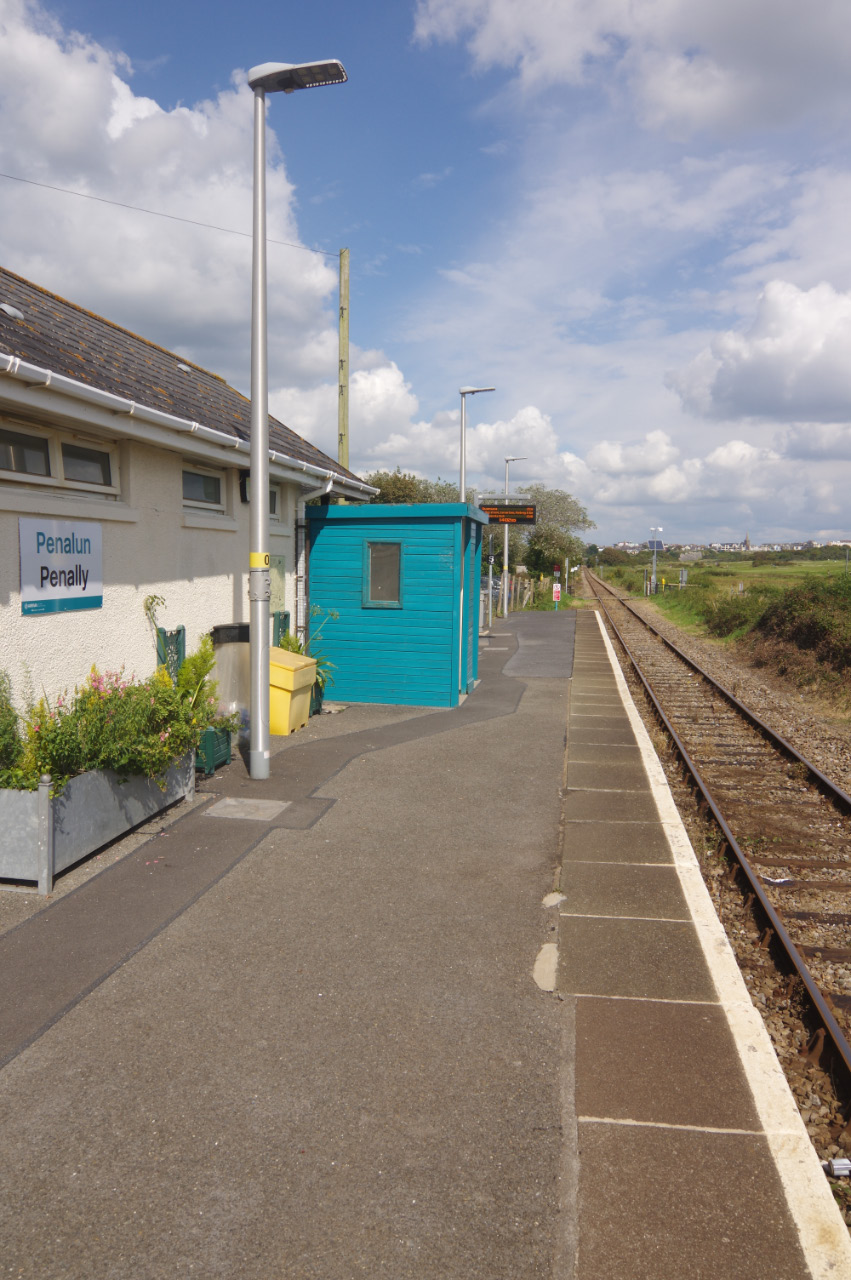

General information
- Location: Penally, Pembrokeshire; Wales
- Coordinates: 51.659°N 4.722°W
- Grid reference: SS118990
- Manager: Transport for Wales
- Platforms: 1

Other information
- Station code: PNA
- Classification: DfT category F2

Passengers
- 2021/22: ▲4,024
- 2022/23: ▲5,630
- 2023/24: ▲6,562
- 2024/25: ▲8,964
- 2025/26: ▲10,686
Location
Notes
- Passenger statistics from the Office of Rail and Road

Penally railway station serves the village of Penally in Pembrokeshire, Wales. It is on the Pembroke Dock branch of the West Wales Line operated by Transport for Wales.

== History ==
Penally station was closed on 15 June 1964, then reopened temporarily during the summers of 1970 and 1971 before being permanently open from 28 February 1972.

== Facilities ==
Step-free access is provided from both station car parks to the platform. The station is unstaffed and only has basic amenities: waiting shelter, timetable information posters and digital CIS displays to offer train running information in real time.

== Services ==
Trains call here every two hours in each direction, westwards to Pembroke Dock and eastwards to Whitland, Carmarthen and Swansea (where connections can be made for stations to Cardiff and destinations in England). There are a pair of through trains to Cardiff each weekday, though late evening services terminate at Carmarthen. There are four trains each way on Sundays. The Summer Saturday GWR service also calls here once a day in both directions.

Preceding station	National Rail	Following station
Tenby	Transport for Wales; West Wales Line	Manorbier
Tenby	Great Western Railway; London – Pembroke	Manorbier
