= Golden Hill =

Golden Hill or Golden Hills may refer to:

== Places ==
=== United Kingdom ===
- Golden Hill, Bristol, England, a suburb
- Golden Hill Fort, Isle of Wight, England
- Golden Hill railway station, original name of Leyland railway station, in Lancashire, England
- Golden Hill Platform railway station (1909–1940), in suburb of Golden Hill, Pembrokeshire, Wales

=== United States ===
- Golden Hill, San Diego, California
- Golden Hills, California
- Golden Hill, Indiana
- Golden Hill State Park, in New York
- Golden Hill Historic District (Bridgeport, Connecticut)
- Golden Hill Historic District (Indianapolis, Indiana)
- Golden Hills Wind Project, in Oregon
- Golden Hills, a slave plantation of Thomas Bouldin near Drakes Branch, Virginia

=== Elsewhere ===
- Golden Hill, Hong Kong, a mountain
- Golden Hills (Russia), an archaeological site
- Golden Hill quarry, a former granite quarry on Golden Hill, Manor Kilbride, County Wicklow, Ireland

== Other uses ==
- Golden Hill Jewish Cemetery, in Omaha, Nebraska, US
- Golden Hill Paugussett Indian Nation, Native American tribe in Connecticut, United States
- Golden Hill (novel), by Francis Spufford, 2016
- Golden Hills School Division No. 75, in Alberta, Canada
- Golden Hills Elementary School, Tehachapi Unified School District, California, United States

== See also ==
- Battle of Golden Hill, 1770, in New York City
- Golden Hill Bridge, a historic bridge on Golden Hill Road over the Housatonic River in Lee, Massachusetts, US
