= Sarnau =

Sarnau may refer to:

- Anneke Kim Sarnau (born 1972), German actress
- Sarnau, a constituent community of Lahntal, Marburg-Biedenkopf, Germany
  - Warburg–Sarnau railway
- Sarnau, a village in Carmarthenshire, Wales
  - Sarnau railway station in Carmarthenshire, Wales
- Sarnau, a village in Ceredigion, Wales
