= Saundersfoot railway station =

Railway station in Pembrokeshire, Wales

Saundersfoot
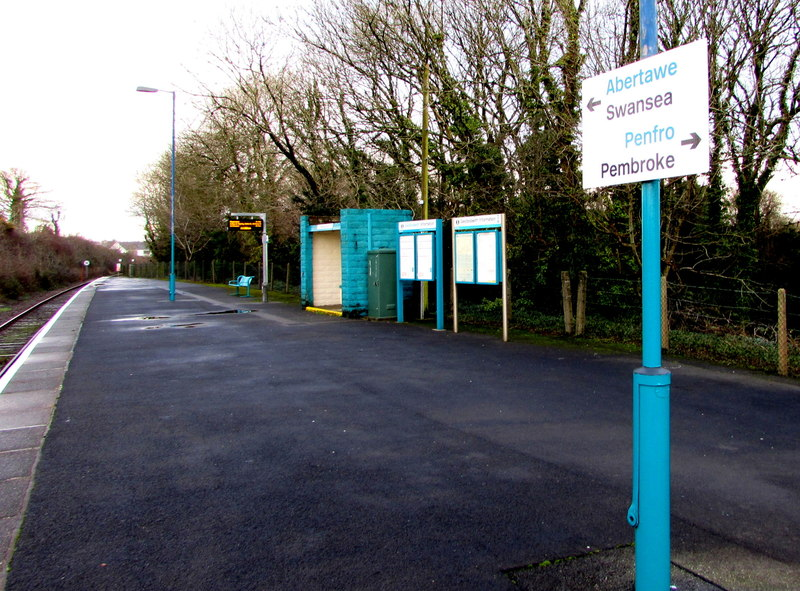

General information
- Location: Saundersfoot, Pembrokeshire; Wales
- Coordinates: 51.722°N 4.717°W
- Grid reference: SN123061
- Manager: Transport for Wales
- Platforms: 1

Other information
- Station code: SDF
- Classification: DfT category F2

Passengers
- 2021/22: ▲6,036
- 2022/23: ▲7,110
- 2023/24: ▲8,908
- 2024/25: ▲11,452
- 2025/26: ▲13,636
Location
Notes
- Passenger statistics from the Office of Rail and Road

Saundersfoot railway station is 1 mile (1.6 km) from Saundersfoot, Pembrokeshire, Wales. It is managed by Transport for Wales Rail. It is usually a request stop apart from the limited-stop Great Western Railway Pembroke Dock services which make a scheduled stop here.

The station is just off of the B4316 road in the Pembrokeshire Coast National Park. The Pembrokeshire Coast Path is approximately 1 mile (1.6 km) mile down the lane at St Issell's church.

A tunnel at King's Moor, which formed part of the old Saundersfoot Railway's second line running from the harbour to Thomas Chapel colliery near Begelly passes beneath the GWR station. The route of this old line now forms part of the Miners Walk.

== Services ==
Trains call here every two hours in each direction, westwards to Pembroke Dock and eastwards to Whitland, Carmarthen and Swansea, where connections can be made for stations to Cardiff and beyond. There are a pair of through trains to Cardiff each day and in the summer, two through Great Western Railway services to and one from London Paddington on Saturdays only. There are five trains each way on Sundays in summer and four in winter.

Preceding station	National Rail	Following station
Kilgetty	Transport for Wales; West Wales Line	Tenby
Whitland or Kilgetty	Great Western Railway; London–Pembroke	Tenby
