= Jameston =

Village in Pembrokeshire, Wales

Coordinates: 51.656°N 4.812°W

- Location within Pembrokeshire
- Population: 634
- OS grid reference: SS055990
- Community: Manorbier
- Principal area: Pembrokeshire
- Country: Wales
- Sovereign state: United Kingdom
- Post town: Tenby
- Postcode district: SA70
- Dialling code: 01834
- Police: Dyfed-Powys
- Fire: Mid and West Wales
- Ambulance: Welsh

Jameston (also spelled Jamestown) is a village in the parish and community of Manorbier, south Pembrokeshire, Wales, 1 mile (1.6 km) northwest of Manorbier. The population in 2011 was 634.

== Description ==
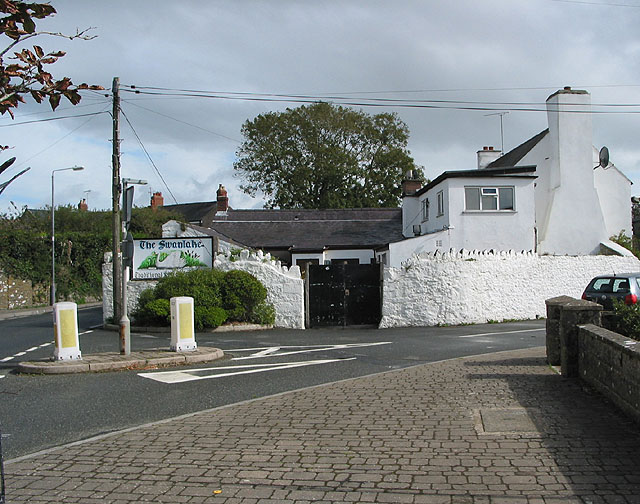
The Swanlake Inn

Jameston is on an intersection of several minor roads and the A4139 Pembroke to Tenby road. A 16th century pub, the Swanlake Inn, is in the village. The nearest railway station is Manorbier railway station.

== History ==
There is some dispute as to whether Jameston was occupied before Norman times. Jameston in the 11th century was a manor, part of the large estate of Manorbier, and was granted to Odo de Barri, the grandfather of Giraldus Cambrensis, for services relating to the Norman conquest.

Jameston was recorded as “apud Sanctu Jacob” in 1295 and in 1331 as “Saint Jameston”. An Originalia Roll of 1330 mention several citizens of Jameston (described as a “township”) whose chattels are valued. They are all described as “fugitive”. Jameston is mentioned two years later in an order to Richard Simond, steward of Pembroke, in an argument over the ownership of land. The de Barri line ended in 1392 and the lands were sold to the Dukes of Exeter, but reverted to the crown in 1461. After that, the manor was leased until the 20th century.

A chapel was marked on a 1578 map and there was an annual fair in the 16th century (held on St James's Day). The fair was listed in the Cambrian Register of 1796 as "small". In the late 17th century Jameston encompassed seven farms, ten houses and a cottage. The village has changed in size very little in several centuries with many village buildings being 18th and 19th century until 20th century housing development began. There was a small school in 1837.

== Worship ==
Quaker meetings were being held in Jameston from about 1714 to 1777. In 1828 a Primitive Methodist chapel was established in the village.

== Village association ==
While it is in the community and parish of Manorbier, Jameston has its own community association and the village community centre was opened in 2013 by writer and adventurer Rosie Swale-Pope.
