= Narberth =

Narberth may refer to:

- Narberth, Pembrokeshire, a town in Wales
  - Narberth Hundred, a traditional hundred of Pembrokeshire, Wales
- Narberth, Pennsylvania, a municipality in the US
- Narberth station (disambiguation), several stations
