= St James's Church, Manorbier =

Church in Pembrokeshire, Wales

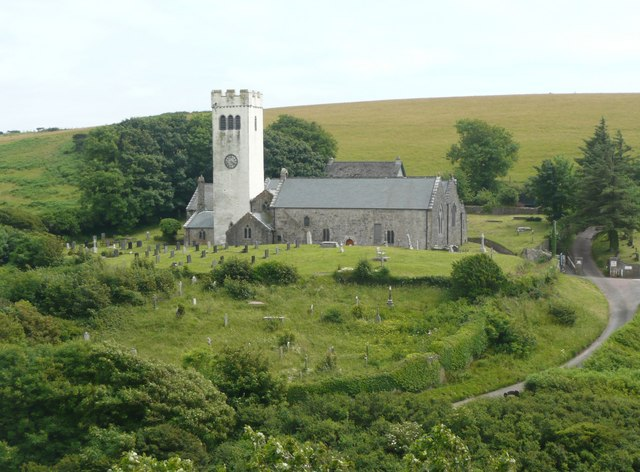
- St James's Church in 2008

- Location in Pembrokeshire
- 51.6438°N 4.7970°W
- Country: Wales
- Denomination: Church in Wales

History
- Dedication: Saint James

Architecture
- Heritage designation: Grade I
- Designated: 14 May 1970
- Architectural type: Church

Specifications
- Materials: Stone, slate roof

St James's Church, Manorbier is a Grade I-listed parish church in Manorbier, Pembrokeshire, Wales. The church dates from the 12th century, and has been considerably altered over the years, though medieval ceiling paintings in the porch survive. The church has a slender tower of the local type and a bellcote. The chancel was built in about 1250 on older foundations with the transepts added in the same period.

There are three military graves in the churchyard dating between 1918 and 1920 that are looked after by the Commonwealth War Graves Commission.
