= Pembroke railway station =

Railway station in Pembrokeshire, Wales

Pembroke Welsh: Penfro
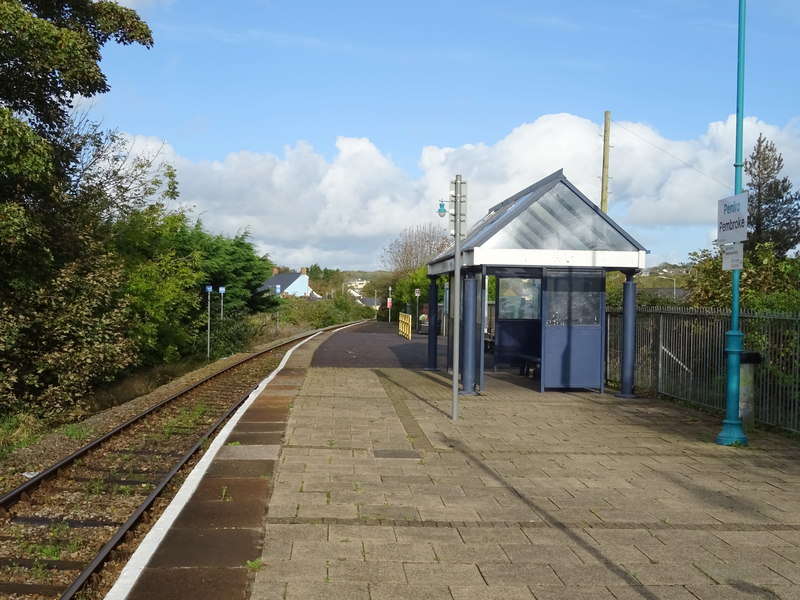

General information
- Location: Pembroke, Pembrokeshire; Wales
- Coordinates: 51.673°N 4.906°W
- Grid reference: SM991011
- Manager: Transport for Wales Rail
- Platforms: 1

Other information
- Station code: PMB
- Classification: DfT category F1

Passengers
- 2021/22: ▲15,664
- 2022/23: ▲23,586
- 2023/24: ▲28,484
- 2024/25: ▲35,106
- 2025/26: ▲37,984
Location
Notes
- Passenger statistics from the Office of Rail and Road

Pembroke railway station serves the town of Pembroke, Pembrokeshire, Wales.

== History ==
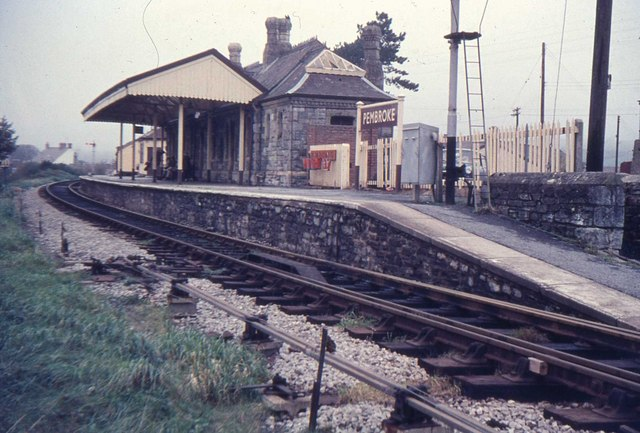
Now demolished station building (October 1967)

On 30 July 1863, Pembroke railway station was opened by the Pembroke and Tenby Railway as the temporary terminus of the line to Tenby. The station originally consisted of small wooden buildings, with a short 150-foot platform. The following year, the line was extended to Pembroke Dock railway station.

A permanent station building was constructed later, built from dressed limestone with a slate roof and three ornamental chimneys. The building contained five rooms; the Station Master's office, a parcels office, a booking office, a general waiting room and a ladies waiting room. Fully glazed canopies were added over the station entrance and platform in the early 1900s, following the takeover of the Pembroke and Tenby by the Great Western Railway. A new shelter was built in 1971, and the main limestone buildings were demolished. This new shelter was in turn was later replaced with a glass panelled shelter.

== Facilities ==
Step-free access is provided from both station car parks to the platform. The station is unstaffed and only has basic amenities: the aforementioned waiting shelter, timetable information posters, bench seating and digital CIS displays to offer train running information in real time.

Like many stations in Wales and the North of England, the station was constructed before standard platform heights were established and is very low. In March 2016, the station received a specially designed raised section - a Harrington Hump - to improve accessibility for passengers.

== Services ==
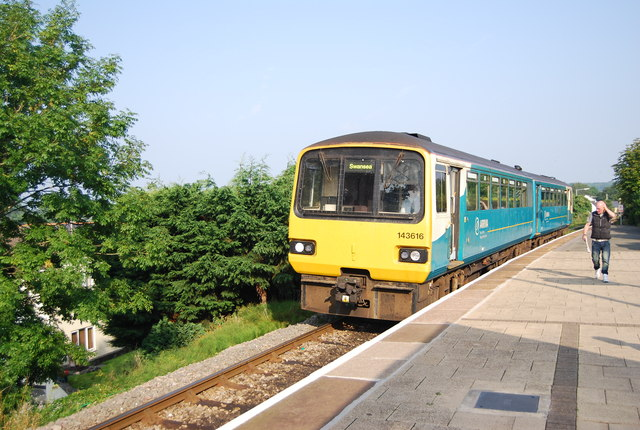
An Arriva Trains Wales Class 143 at Pembroke

The station is served every two hours (approximately) to/from Swansea via Carmarthen and Whitland on weekdays, with connections for the South Wales mainline available at Swansea. The Sunday service is limited in winter (4 trains each way), but more frequent in the summer months.

On summer Saturdays, the station is also used by Great Western Railway who provided two InterCity 125s in each direction; two to London Paddington, one from London Paddington and one early morning InterCity 125 starting its journey from Swansea. One through train in each direction is named the Pembroke Coast Express. In 2019, the service has continued running with the brand new Class 800 rolling stock.

Preceding station	National Rail	Following station
Lamphey	Transport for Wales; West Wales line	Pembroke Dock
Lamphey	Great Western Railway; London – Pembroke; Summer Saturdays only	Pembroke Dock
