= Pembroke and Tenby Railway =

Railway line in Wales

Coordinates: 51.6728°N 4.7067°W

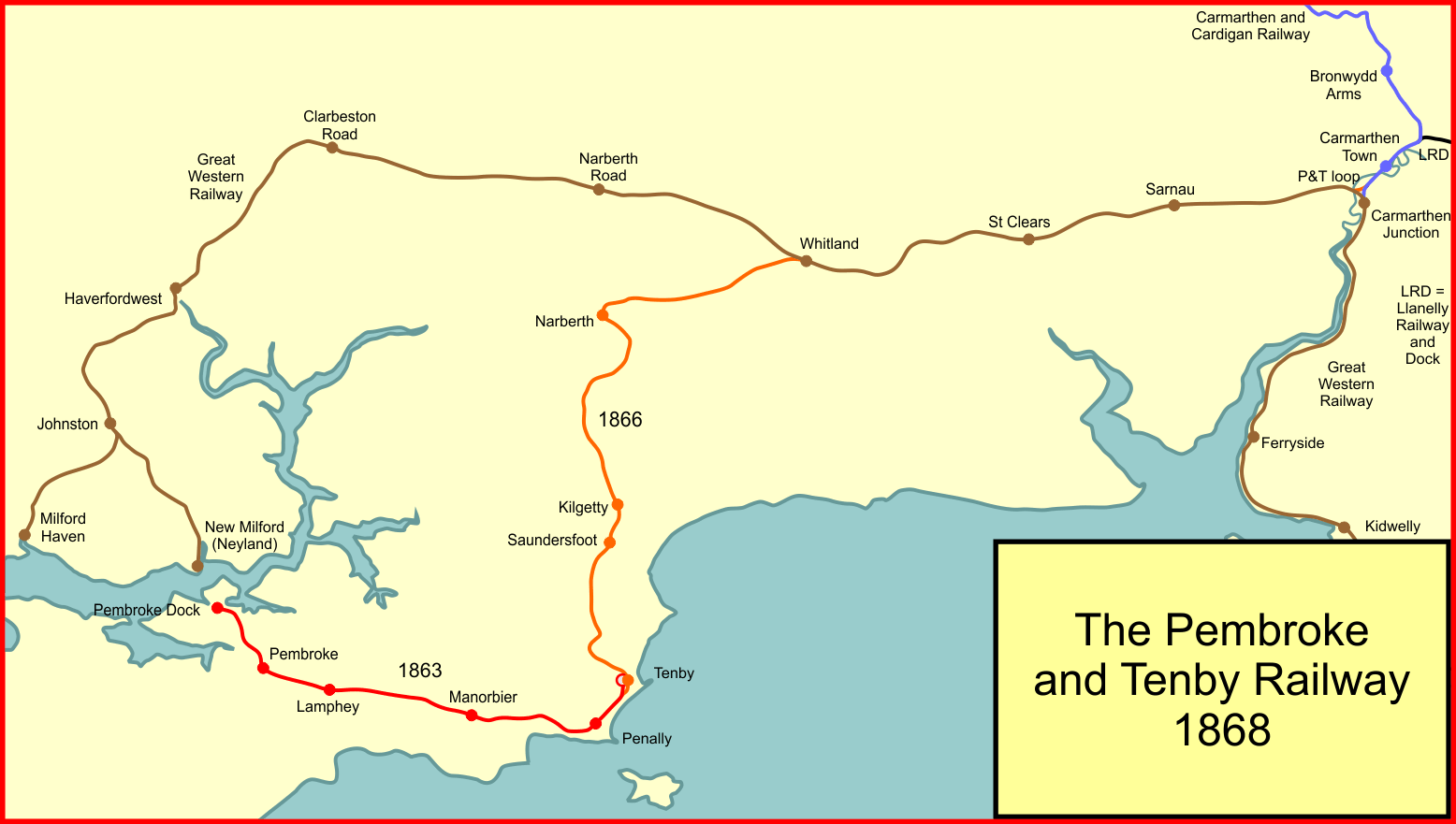
Pembroke and Tenby Railway

The Pembroke and Tenby Railway was a locally promoted railway in Pembrokeshire, Wales. It was built by local supporters and opened in 1863. The line, now known as the Pembroke Dock branch line, remains in use at the present day.

In 1814 a Royal Navy Dockyard had been established at Pembroke Dock. The South Wales Railway had been authorised to build a branch line to Pembroke, but had failed to do so. Their terminus in Neyland was a short ferry crossing from Pembroke Dock.

In 1866, the Pembroke and Tenby Railway was extended to Whitland; Whitland was on the South Wales Railway broad gauge main line but being on the narrow gauge – later known as standard gauge – it was not possible to run Pembroke and Tenby trains on the South Wales Railway lines to Carmarthen. The intention of the Pembroke and Tenby Railway was to make an alliance with other narrow gauge railways at Carmarthen, and the Great Western Railway (as successor to the South Wales Railway) did provide a narrow gauge link to Carmarthen. Experiencing financial difficulties, the company sold its line to the Great Western Railway in 1897.

== South Wales Railway ==
The South Wales Railway was incorporated in 1845 to build from the Great Western Railway at Gloucester through to Cardiff, Swansea, Carmarthen and Fishguard. The authorised capital was £2.8 million. Fishguard Bay was the destination as the strategic intention was to secure the Royal Mail contract for Dublin mails; the Great Western Railway had a close association with railway promoters on the Irish side, who would build a line from Wexford to Dublin. The South Wales Railway itself was an affiliate of the Great Western Railway, and was to be built on the broad gauge, and its engineer was Isambard Kingdom Brunel. The South Wales Railway Act 1845 (8 & 9 Vict. c. cxc) also authorised a branch line from Whitland to Pembroke, taking a direct course and not running near Tenby.

In 1845, the Great Famine of Ireland caused both mass starvation and commercial depression which deepened the following year. The Irish partners of the Great Western Railway declared that they could not continue with the proposed Dublin line. Also, Brunel was having misgivings about Fishguard due to its exposure to high winds and the decision was taken to make a port on the north shore of the Milford Haven Waterway at Neyland instead, and to extend the planned Haverfordwest branch. The South Wales Railway opened its line as far as Haverfordwest on 2 January 1854, and to Neyland on 15 April 1856. This station was named Milford Haven for some years. The name was later transferred to the station several miles west, that remains open at the present day.

Tenby, Saundersfoot and South Wales Railway Act 1846
- Act of Parliament
- Parliament of the United Kingdom
- Long title: An Act for making a Railway to connect the Saundersfoot Railway with the South Wales Railway, with the Harbour of Saundersfoot, and with the Town of Tenby, to be called "The Tenby, Saundersfoot, and South Wales Railway;" and for other Purposes.
- Citation: 9 & 10 Vict. c. cclvi

Dates
- Royal assent: 27 July 1846

When the South Wales Railway was authorised, the directors of the Saundersfoot Railway and Harbour Company decided to seek powers to build a line linking both Tenby and Saundersfoot to the SWR Pembroke branch at Reynalton. This was authorised by the Tenby, Saundersfoot and South Wales Railway Act 1846 (9 & 10 Vict. c. cclvi) as the Tenby, Saundersfoot and South Wales Railway and Pier Company, with authorised capital of £140,000. However, the South Wales Railway (SWR) did not attempt to build their Pembroke branch, so construction of the Tenby and Saundersfoot line was not started either. Local people were indignant that the SWR had obtained authority for the line but were failing to construct it, and, in 1852, a local landowner, Baron de Rutzen, applied in the High Court for a writ of mandamus, which if granted would compel the SWR to build the line. (Note: The so-called "Cardwell" clause was inserted into nearly all railway acts of Parliament at this time, providing for the suspension of dividends if authorised parts of the line were not built.)

At this, the SWR undertook to introduce a new bill for the line, and de Rutzen agreed to withdraw his writ. In 1853, the SWR sought an extension of time for construction of the branch and a change to the route, taking it closer to Tenby. When the South Wales Railway was first authorised, Pembroke was the most important centre in the area and the proposed branch was a natural asset. By now, Neyland had been adopted as the main line terminus, and it was a five-minute ferry crossing from Pembroke dockyard. Plainly, building a 27-mile railway from Whitland to Pembroke dock was unattractive, and in any case, the company had already stretched its finances too far.

As part of the stalling process, the SWR let a contract for construction, but the contractor did not start work. There were stated to be legal difficulties over land acquisition, and contractual problems with the contractor. Finally, the SWR dividend for the second half of 1857 was suspended; in the High Court; it pleaded that it had attempted in good faith to build it, but now had no money to do so.

There was considerable hostility locally, and in an extraordinary move, the SWR prepared two bills in 1857: one was simply for a time extension for the original line and the second was for a new line from Narberth Road (later Clynderwen and later still Clunderwen) on the Neyland main line, following the eastern bank of the River Cleddau; this route was very sinuous, and a little shorter. The bill for reviving the powers failed in the 1858 session; the bill for a new branch was passed in the Commons, but the Lords agreed with the company that the expense of the line was not justified. This was the last straw for the local people and they resolved to prepare their own bill for a line from Tenby to Pembroke Dockyard with a short branch to the pier at Hobbs Point for the ferry to Neyland.

== The Pembroke and Tenby Railway authorised ==
On 21 July 1859, the Pembroke and Tenby Railway Act 1859 (22 & 23 Vict. c. vi) was given royal assent, and the South Wales Pembroke and Tenby Junction Railway was authorised. It was to be 11 1/2 miles (18.5 km) in length, with authorised capital of £80,000. Significantly, it was to be built on the standard gauge, (Note: At the time, usually referred to as the "narrow gauge" as it had not yet been standardised.) not the broad gauge of the South Wales Railway.

However it was one thing to be authorised to raise £80,000 and quite a different matter to persuade investors to commit the money. Interest in the company was low, and many shareholders’ meetings failed to achieve a quorum. By 1861, the company changed its name to the less cumbersome Pembroke and Tenby Railway.

It seemed likely that the company's plans were in vain, but the dynamic contracting partnership of David Davies and Ezra Roberts entered into discussions with the directors and on 4 July 1862 they committed to build the line and provide rolling stock for £106,000. They were to be given nearly the whole capital of the company in cash in hand and fully paid up shares. They were financing the construction themselves. They undertook to complete the work by 21 July 1864.

In fact the work progressed faster than that. The first locomotive was brought overland, dragged on the public road by 33 horses, possibly on 6 May 1863. (Note: Price says it was brought in by road, but says the date is uncertain; he provides a photograph that is "probably" of the event.)

== Opening ==
A turntable was provided at Tenby and two more locomotives were brought in by sea. The customary Board of Trade inspection took place on 24 July 1863 and approval to open was given, and the line opened on 30 July 1863 between Pembroke and Tenby. There were three trains each way daily, increased to five from September, but the service was reduced to three again in December; the line was worked by Davies and Roberts. At first the line was not opened between Pembroke and Pembroke Dock, but this too was completed and opened on 8 August 1864.

During the construction process, the Directors had given consideration to extending the line to Whitland; the isolation from the national railway network was a limitation. At the same time the standard gauge Manchester and Milford Railway was under construction, and, despite difficulties it was experiencing, it was possible to conceive of the Pembroke and Tenby Railway linking with the M&MR and forming a long distance strategic standard gauge line by-passing the Great Western Railway and reaching the great manufacturing districts of the north-west of England.

The Great Western Railway had absorbed the South Wales Railway in 1862. The Carmarthen and Cardigan Railway had built a spur from Carmarthen Junction station, the station in Carmarthen on the through line from Swansea to Neyland, to their Town station north of the River Tywi.

== Extending to Whitland and Carmarthen ==
Pembroke and Tenby Railway (Extension) Act 1864
- Act of Parliament
- Parliament of the United Kingdom
- Long title: An Act to enable the Pembroke and Tenby Railway Company to construct new Lines of Railway; and for other Purposes.
- Citation: 27 & 28 Vict. c.clxxxiii

Dates
- Royal assent: 14 July 1864

Text of statute as originally enacted

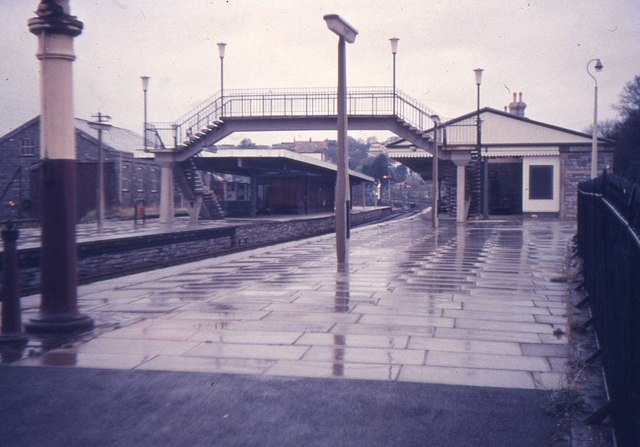
Tenby station

The Pembroke and Tenby Railway (Extension) Act 1864 (27 & 28 Vict. c.clxxxiii) of 14 July 1864 authorised a standard gauge extension from Tenby to Whitland, and also a standard gauge west curve at Carmarthen, allowing through-running from Whitland into Carmarthen Town and to meet the Manchester and Milford Railway. It was assumed that the GWR would lay a third rail, making their tracks mixed gauge, to carry standard gauge trains as well, from Whitland to the west curve at Carmarthen. Capital for the Whitland extension was set at £200,000.

Davies and Roberts leased the Pembroke and Tenby Railway from 8 August 1864, paying shareholders (mostly themselves) 5% on capital, but the lease was considered to be ultra vires for the company which had no power to lease its line, so Davies and Roberts agreed to operate according to the terms of the lease, but as contractors and not lessees.

The Whitland extension was soon finished and the Board of Trade inspection was carried out by Captain Rich on 1 September 1866. Everything was satisfactory and the line opened to the public on 4 September 1866. The company had its own separate station at Whitland, alongside the Great Western Railway station. The Tenby station was relocated to allow for through-running.

The presumption that the Great Western Railway would acquiesce in mixing the gauge of the track from Whitland to Carmarthen proved to be naive; the GWR would not hasten to facilitate unwelcome competition in its own back yard. This difficulty came to light during the construction of the Whitland extension, and the Pembroke and Tenby directors decided on 12 October 1865 to survey an independent line from Whitland to Carmarthen. The line was to be 14 miles long, running generally south of the GWR line but crossing it at Sarnau.

Pembroke and Tenby Railway Act 1866
- Act of Parliament
- Parliament of the United Kingdom
- Long title: An Act to enable the Pembroke and Tenby Railway Company to extend their Railway to Caermarthen and to Milford Haven; to lease their Undertaking; and for other Purposes.
- Citation: 29 & 30 Vict. c. cccxxx

Dates
- Royal assent: 6 August 1866

The parliamentary bill for this was passed as the Pembroke and Tenby Railway Act 1866 (29 & 30 Vict. c. cccxxx) on 6 August 1866; GWR opposition was in vain in view of its obstructive attitude; the act authorised an additional £115,000 capital. Seeing that its position was lost, the GWR now agreed to negotiate, and an agreement was reached on 18 July 1866. The line from Whitland to Carmarthen was double track, and instead of providing mixed gauge track, the GWR agreed to convert their up line to standard gauge between Whitland and Carmarthen.

The Pembroke and Tenby Railway constructed a west curve at Carmarthen, enabling through running from the Whitland direction into Carmarthen Town; this was known as "the P&T Loop". The Pembroke and Tenby Railway Act 1866 authorised this and an extension into Carmarthen Town station, but the latter part was surrendered by the P&TR in view of the use of the GWR line. Carmarthen gave the P&TR access to the Llanelly Railway and Dock Company, which had reached there in 1865 from Llandilo to Abergwili Junction, managing the last mile or so over the Carmarthen and Cardigan Railway. The Llanelly Railway was to connect at the north end with the Central Wales Line and ultimately the London and North Western Railway.

The Pembroke and Tenby Railway Company contributed £20,000 to the cost of the GWR conversion; they protested that they had assumed that both lines would be converted to mixed gauge.

The GWR did not hasten to carry out the work, but it was finally completed by 1 June 1868. There was a section of mixed gauge at St Clears to provide passing loops on the single lines. This conversion was the first instance of GWR broad gauge track being altered to narrow (standard) gauge.

At this stage there was no P&TR passenger service on the line east of Whitland: the traffic was chiefly minerals and general merchandise. A P&TR passenger service on the main line ran from August 1869.

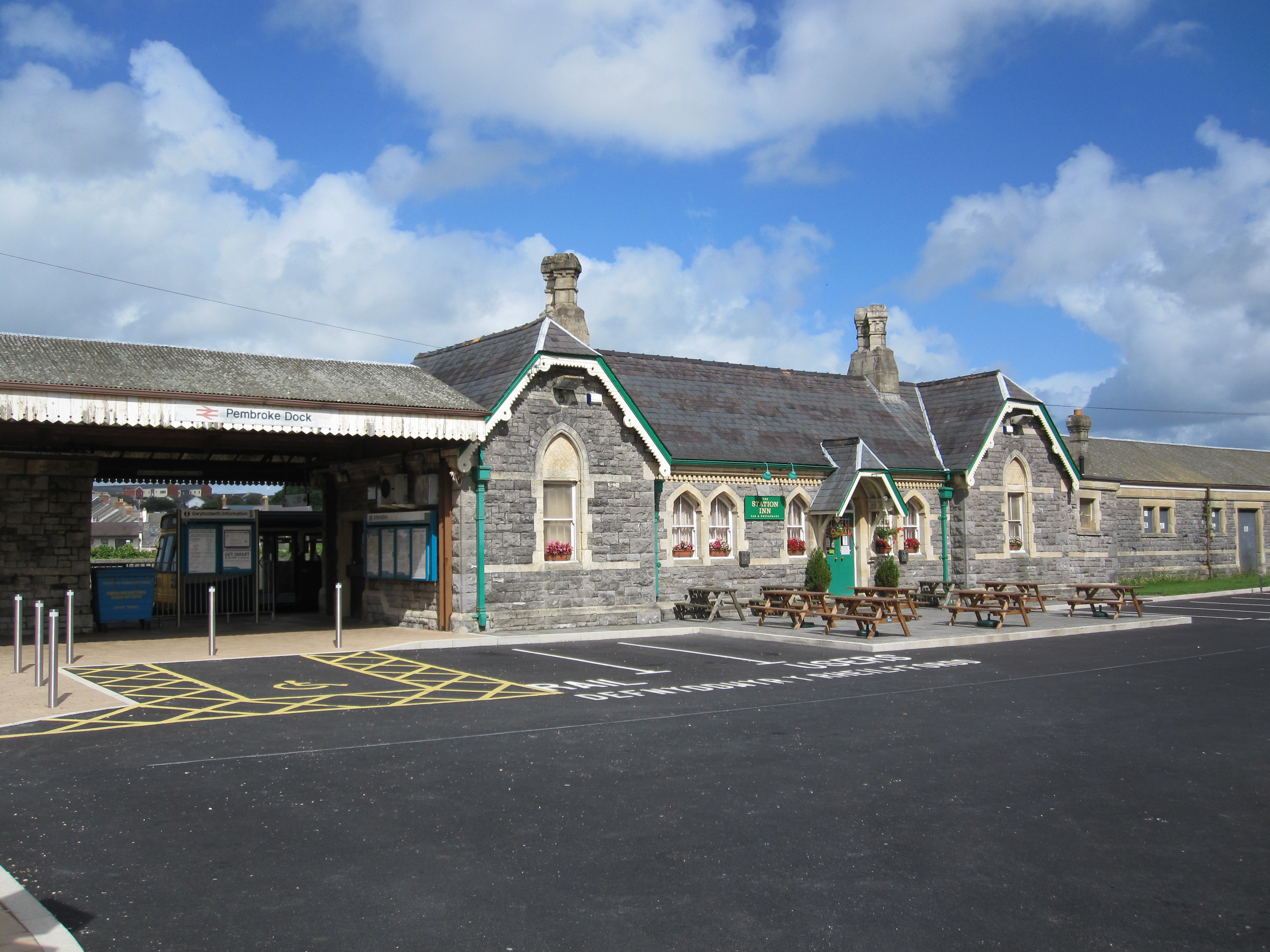
Pembroke Dock station in 2012)

If the P&TR imagined that a connection to Carmarthen was the solution to its difficulties, it was to discover that its allies were not easy to deal with. The Carmarthen and Cardigan Railway (C&CR), as the operator of the station at Carmarthen, demanded a toll payment equal to four miles for P&TR traffic, even though only 48 chains (970 m) of C&CR line was used. In addition the P&TR had to negotiate with the Manchester and Milford Railway (M&MR) over access further north, and of course the GWR. The authorising acts of Parliament obliged the P&TR to accept through carriages from the M&MR and the Llanelly Railway.

The C&CR demanded £350 annually for the use of Carmarthen station facilities, where P&TR goods traffic was exchanged with the M&MR and the Llanelly Railway. There was a continuing dispute over this charge, and for three days in May 1869 the C&CR blocked the use of Carmarthen station by P&TR wagons.

A P&TR passenger service to Carmarthen was started at the beginning of August 1869 and, from then, for a period Tenby had through carriages from Manchester and Liverpool via the Central Wales line, exchanged at Carmarthen. At the end of June 1872, the working contract with Davies and Roberts expired and the P&TR took over the running of its trains. In May 1872, the LNWR published a timetable showing through carriages from Tenby to Euston, running via Shrewsbury and Stafford and in retaliation the GWR announced a Paddington to Pembroke Dock through connection via Gloucester.

== Gauge change on the South Wales Railway route ==
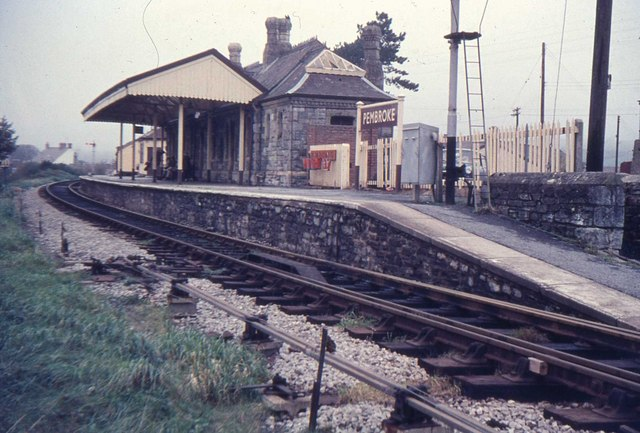
Pembroke station

In May 1872, the GWR altered the track gauge in South Wales to standard gauge. The GWR obliged the Pembroke and Tenby Railway (P&TR) to supply rails to assist the process of conversion of track used by the P&TR at Carmarthen.

The economics of running independent trains between Whitland and Carmarthen were altered by the GWR gauge conversion, and, from 1 August 1872, all services by the P&TR east of Whitland ceased. For passengers, through coaches were attached to GWR trains at Whitland; these trains called at Carmarthen Junction and were detached there and worked forward to Carmarthen Town station.

The Pembroke and Tenby Loop at Carmarthen therefore had no traffic and it was reduced to siding status. From the same date, the Manchester and Milford Railway (M&MR) ceased to run into Carmarthen Town station, and it terminated its trains at Pencader; the through carriages from Euston were no more, and the P&TR was isolated from its earlier narrow gauge allies.

== Extensions at Pembroke Dock ==
Pembroke and Tenby Railway Act 1859
- Act of Parliament
- Parliament of the United Kingdom
- Long title: An Act for making Railways from Pembroke Dock to Tenby, and from Pembroke Dock to the Pier at Hobbs Point, in the County of Pembroke.
- Citation: 22 & 23 Vict. c. vi

Dates
- Royal assent: 21 July 1859

The Pembroke and Tenby Railway Act 1859 (22 & 23 Vict. c. vi) had envisaged the ferry pier at Hobbs Point in Pembroke Dock being the termination of the railway line, giving direct access to Neyland. The release of government land was required and as this was not done in time, the powers expired. When the branch was finally built, the junction was made 17 chains east of Pembroke Dock station and the branch was 51 chains long; it was ready in April 1872, opened for goods traffic only. However, the Admiralty repeatedly objected to the extension of a pier into deep water, frustrating aspirations to bring larger vessels to the pier.

Pembroke and Tenby Railway (Dockyard Extension) Act 1870
- Act of Parliament
- Parliament of the United Kingdom
- Long title: An Act to enable the Pembroke and Tenby Railway Company to extend their railway to Pembroke Dockyard, and to make arrangements with the Admiralty; and for other purposes.
- Citation: 33 & 34 Vict. c. cxxvii

Dates
- Royal assent: 14 July 1870

Text of statute as originally enacted

Separately, an extension railway to the dockyard was authorised by the Pembroke and Tenby Railway (Dockyard Extension) Act 1870 (33 & 34 Vict. c. cxxvii); the line was difficult, descending on gradients of 1 in 44, and having six level crossings in the town; it opened on 21 July 1871. The Dockyard Extension Railway was later taken over by the Admiralty, on 1 January 1892, for £23,334 in commutation of a £933 yearly payment.

== Absorption by the GWR ==
From 1874, earnings declined and, by 1877, the financial situation of the Pembroke and Tenby Railway (P&TR) was serious; moreover the state of the permanent way and other infrastructure was known to be poor, and money needed to be spent on it. A number of management changes were made, and also a simplification of the committee structure of the company. Consolidation with the M&MR was considered, but the Manchester and Milford Railway (M&MR) itself was in difficulty and not carrying the trunk traffic it had been built for, and was hardly of any financial assistance.

In 1886, the Board of Trade was critical of the P&TR practice of running mixed trains with passenger carriages behind the goods wagons. In addition, there was increasing pressure to equip trains with continuous brakes, to install interlocking of signals and the block system of signalling; all of these initiatives required considerable expenditure and the P&TR did not have the money. The financial situation revived consideration of amalgamation, and the LNWR was considered as a partner, but this led to nothing. In fact the Great Western Railway (GWR) became the partner and a lease of the P&TR to the GWR was agreed, to take effect on 1 July 1896. The GWR absorbed the company on 1 July 1897, authorised under the Great Western Railway (Additional Powers) Act 1897 (60 & 61 Vict. c. ccxlviii) of 6 August 1897.

The GWR had long been considering moving Carmarthen Town station to the south side of the River Towy, to a site where plenty of available land existed. It now began to put the work in hand. By reopening the old Pembroke and Tenby Loop, a triangle of tracks was formed and through passenger trains from Swansea could run into Carmarthen station and reverse there, continuing their journey west over the loop; the former arrangement of using Carmarthen Junction was discontinued. The new arrangements were inaugurated on 1 July 1902.

The GWR improved Pembroke Dock station, and the locomotive shed there was enlarged; the old P&TR locomotive workshops were closed.

== The twentieth century ==
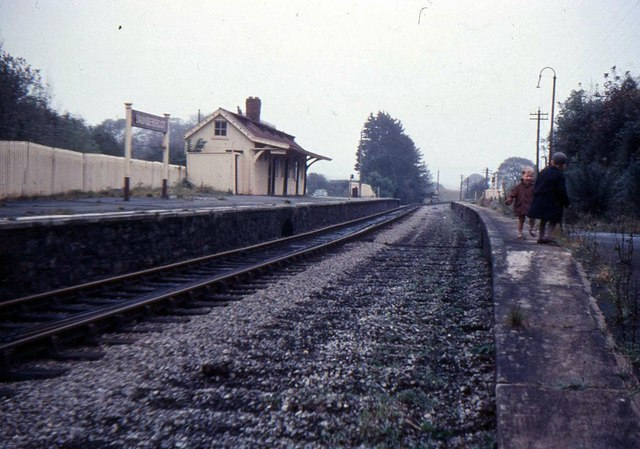
Saundersfoot station in 1967

With the growth of seaside holiday traffic, the GWR introduced a summer-only railmotor service between Pembroke Dock and Saundersfoot in June 1905; a more frequent service was possible and several halts for the railmotors were opened. One was at Llanion, only 21 chains from Pembroke Dock station (at the present-day Llanion Cottages) but this was not successful and it closed after the summer of 1908. The railmotor services were withdrawn after the summer of 1914.

At the beginning of the twentieth century, there was a daily through-carriage from Tenby to Paddington and return, as well as a sleeping car to and from Pembroke Dock, but this did not survive World War I. In the summer of 1928, one up and one down train were titled the Tenby and Carmarthen Bay Express. By 1953, the Pembroke Coast Express ran from Paddington 10:55 to Pembroke Dock arriving 5:26pm; the up train left Paddington at 1:05pm and arrived at Pembroke Dock at 7:45pm; the stock was stabled overnight at Pembroke Dock.

Diesel traction was first seen on the branch on summer Saturdays in 1959 and regularly from the autumn of 1963; the final steam train ran on 8 September 1963.

== Rationalisation ==
Some rationalisation took place in the 1960s: Penally and Beavers Hill closed on 15 June 1964, and, on 3 October 1965, the crossing loops at Narberth, Templeton, Saundersfoot and Manorbier were abolished; the signal sections were now Whitland to Tenby and Tenby to Pembroke. From 23 August 1966, one train only working arrangements were installed from Pembroke to Pembroke Dock, and only one platform remained at the Dock station. The Hobbs Point and Dockyard branches officially closed on 1 January 1969 but they had long been dormant.

Penally station reopened on 24 June 1970; at first, trains called only between June and September but, in 1972, all year-round operation started. Pembroke Power Station was inaugurated in 1968, and during the construction phase there was some inward traffic in building materials, particularly for concrete, but when construction was completed the traffic ceased: the power station was oil-fired. The passing loop at Pembroke was removed in September 1971 and no-signalman key token operation applied from Tenby to Pembroke Dock; no revenue goods traffic ran on the line after 31 December 1978.

B&I Ferries started operation from Pembroke on 22 May 1979, with sailings to Cork and later to Rosslare, but despite early optimism this brought hardly any traffic to the branch, and the Cork ferry operation was never successful; the last sailing from Pembroke to Cork was in January 1986.

== The present day ==
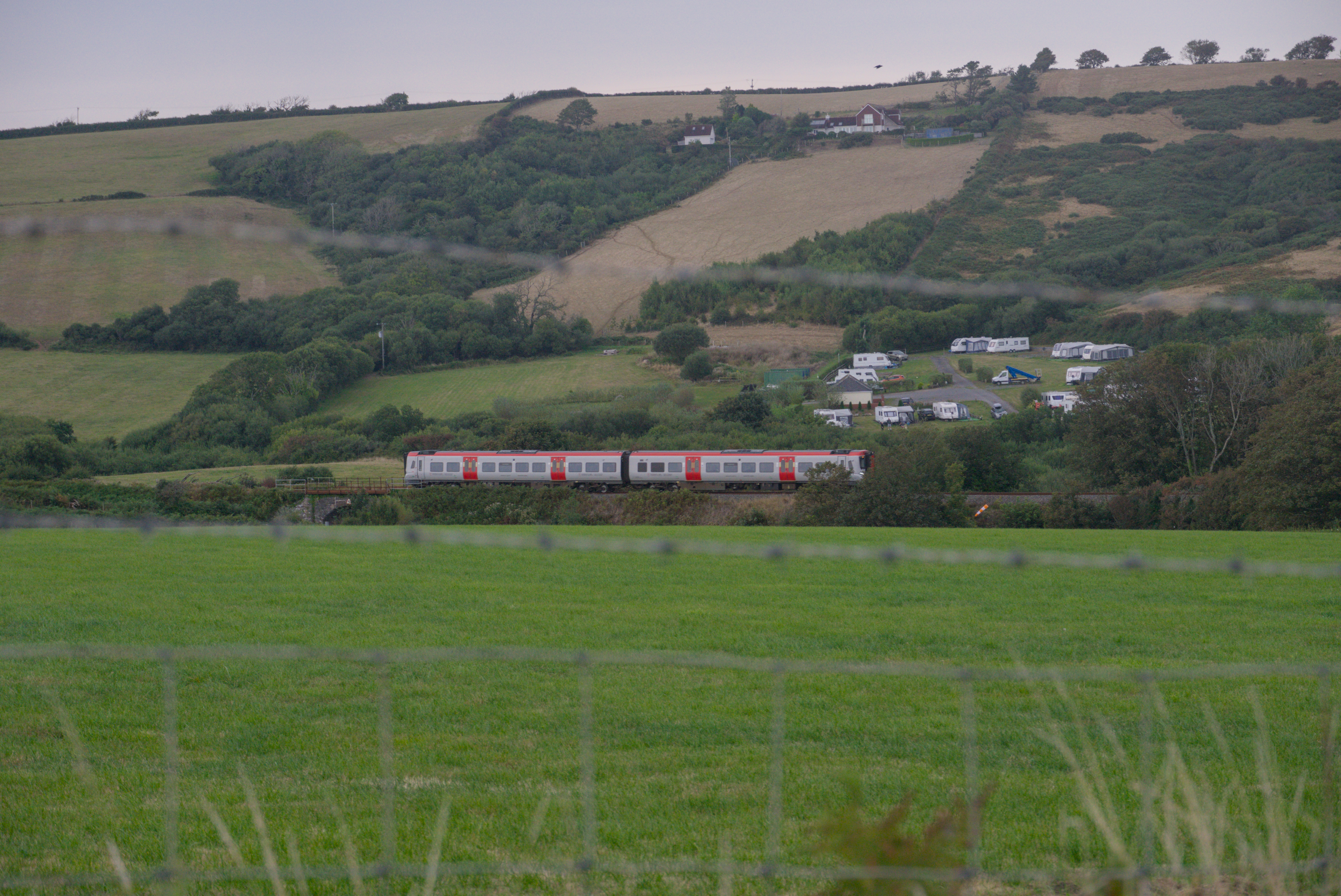
British Rail Class 197 near Penally

The line, now known as the Pembroke Dock branch of the West Wales Line, is operated by Transport for Wales Rail, who also manage the stations. Trains stop (on request at some stations) every two hours in each direction, westwards to Pembroke Dock and eastwards to Tenby, Whitland, Carmarthen and Swansea.

From Whitland, the branch is a single track. It climbs at 1 in 50 to Narberth, followed by Narberth Tunnel, after which is Cold Blow summit. The line then descends at 1 in 47 through Templeton, Kilgetty and Saundersfoot to Tenby at 1 in 50, where there is a seven arch viaduct over the town. The line runs behind sand dunes and golf courses to Penally. After passing the site of Black Rock Junction, where there was a quarry siding and a lower yard, the line continues to Manorbier, Lamphey, Pembroke and terminates at Pembroke Dock.

Station list:

- Whitland; P&T station alongside South Wales Railway station opened 5 September 1866; diverted to SWR station August 1869;
- Templeton Platform; trains stopped from 4 September 1866, but no station building until 1867; initially only for market trips to Tenby and Pembroke; closed 15 June 1964;
- Kilgetty and Begelly; opened 5 September 1866; renamed Kilgetty 1901;
- Saundersfoot; opened 5 September 1866; relocated at the end of June 1868;
- Saundersfoot colliery branch, 1900 to 1939;
- Tenby; opened 6 August 1863; relocated when extension to Whitland opened on 4 September 1866; the original terminus was at a lower level and was used as a goods yard subsequently;
- Penally; opened by October 1863; closed 15 June 1964; reopened 29 June 1970; closed 16 November 1970; reopened 5 April 1971; closed 13 September 1971; reopened 29 February 1972;
- Lydstep Halt; opened by 1873 for excursions and picnics; public opening 1 May 1905; from Autumn 1908, probably summer only; closed 21 January 1914; reopened 9 July 1923; closed 2 January 1956;
- Manorbier; opened 6 August 1863;
- Beaver's Hill Halt; opened 1 May 1905; closed in winter from 1908; closed 2 September 1914; reopened 1 December 1923; closed 15 June 1964;
- Lamphey; opened 6 August 1863;
- Pembroke; opened 6 August 1863;
- Golden Hill Platform; opened 1 July 1909; closed 5 February 1940;
- Llanion Halt; opened 1 May 1905; closed 1 October 1908;
- Pembroke Dock; opened 8 August 1864; original temporary station relocated 1865.
- The line forked and continued to the ferry pier at Hobbs Point from 1872 to 1969, and to the dockyard from 1871 to 1969.

== See also ==
- The Great Western Railway in West Wales
- Saundersfoot Railway
- John Speller's Web Pages: Pembroke and Tenby Railway at http://spellerweb.net/rhindex/UKRH/GreatWestern/Narrowgauge/Pembroke.html
