= Narberth railway station (Wales) =

Railway station in Pembrokeshire, Wales

Narberth Welsh: Arberth
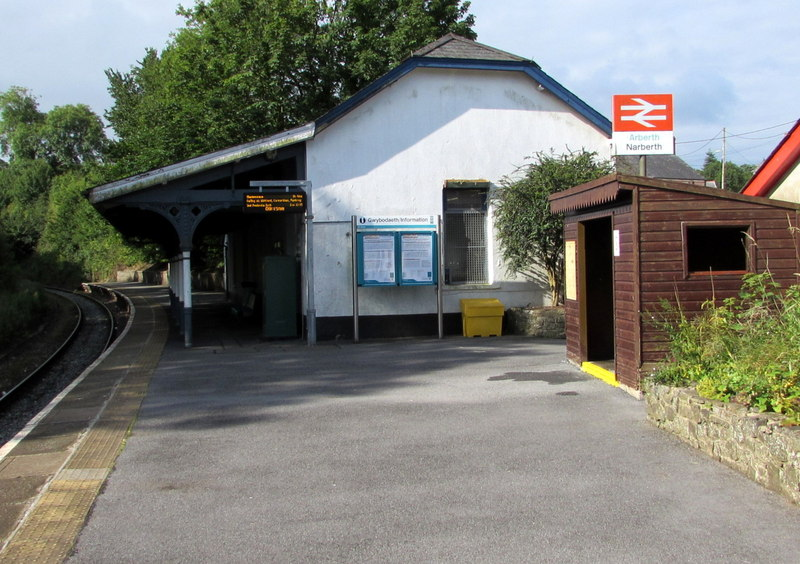

General information
- Location: Narberth, Pembrokeshire; Wales
- Coordinates: 51.799°N 4.727°W
- Grid reference: SN120147
- Manager: Transport for Wales
- Platforms: 1

Other information
- Station code: NAR
- Classification: DfT category F2

Passengers
- 2021/22: ▲9,548
- 2022/23: ▲13,468
- 2023/24: ▲17,296
- 2024/25: ▲22,492
- 2025/26: ▲23,886
Location
Notes
- Passenger statistics from the Office of Rail and Road

Narberth railway station serves the town of Narberth, Pembrokeshire, Wales. The station is on the West Wales Line, 19¾ miles (32 km) west of Carmarthen.

== Services ==
Monday to Saturdays, there is a two-hourly service westbound to Pembroke Dock and eastbound to Carmarthen and Swansea with four services in each direction on Sundays. On Summer Saturdays a Great Western Railway service calls en route to Pembroke Dock, and again on its way back to London Paddington.

Preceding station	National Rail	Following station
Whitland	Transport for Wales; West Wales Line	Kilgetty
Whitland	Great Western Railway; London – Pembroke	Kilgetty
