= St Clears railway station =

Former railway station in Wales

St Clears
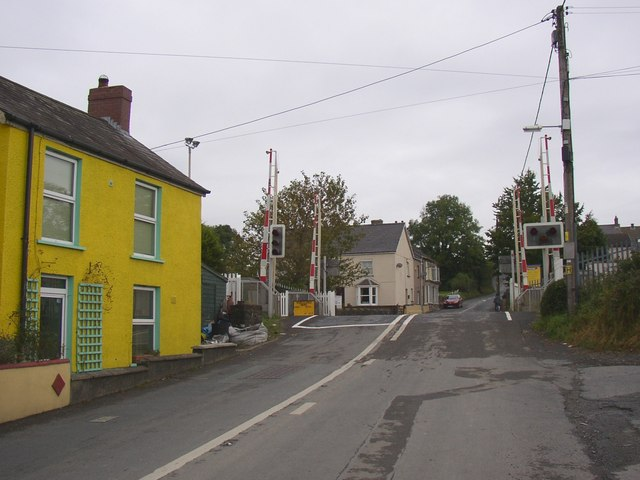
- The station was right of the level crossing

General information
- Location: St Clears, Carmarthenshire; Wales
- Coordinates: 51.8283°N 4.4923°W
- Grid reference: SN283173
- Platforms: 2

Other information
- Status: Disused

History
- Original company: South Wales Railway
- Pre-grouping: Great Western Railway
- Post-grouping: Great Western Railway

Key dates
- 2 January 1854: Station opened
- 15 June 1964: Station closed
- ?: Potential reopening
Location

St Clears railway station served the town of St Clears, Carmarthenshire, Wales between 1854 and 1964. It was on the West Wales Line.

== History ==
The station opened on 2 January 1854. It was on the section of the South Wales Railway which opened that day between the temporary station near Carmarthen and Haverfordwest, and was situated between Sarnau and Whitland.

The station closed on 15 June 1964. An attempt to reopen the station in 1973 was made by five local authorities and organisations, together with the Department of the Environment, which jointly agreed to fund construction of a new station at a total cost of £5,400 (equivalent to £32,000 in 2023 (Note: UK Retail Price Index inflation figures are based on data from Clark, Gregory (2017). "The Annual RPI and Average Earnings for Britain, 1209 to Present (New Series)". MeasuringWorth.)). The new station would have consisted of concrete platforms adjoining both tracks and timber waiting shelters provided with electric lighting. It had been hoped that works would be swiftly completed so that the first trains could call at St Clears by the end of Summer 1973, but this did not materialise.

== New reopening proposals ==
There has long been a local campaign for the reopening of the station, supported by Angela Burns AM and William Powell AM.

Locals started a Facebook campaign to reopen the station in 2010 which drew in thousands of supporters. The St Clears Times ran a community poll from 2010 and 95% of people who voted were in favour of opening the station.

There have been recent proposals to reopen the station as part of the Welsh Governments Rail infrastructure investment. In 2019 it was shortlisted by Welsh Government for further assessment, along with three other stations (from an original longlist of 12) as part of a national strategy to improve transport links. In 2020, funding was secured to reopen the station by 2024. Some initial activities (groundwork and surveying) were carried out in February and March 2022. Final design work has not been completed and a timetable for construction of the new station has yet to be announced.

== Routes ==
Preceding station	Historical railways	Following station
Sarnau; Line open, station closed	Great Western Railway; South Wales Railway	Whitland; Line and station open
	Future services	
Carmarthen	Transport for Wales; West Wales line	Whitland

== See also ==
- West Wales lines
- Transport for Wales
- Proposed railway stations in Wales
