= Tenby railway station =

Railway station in Pembrokeshire, Wales

Tenby Welsh: Dinbych-y-pysgod
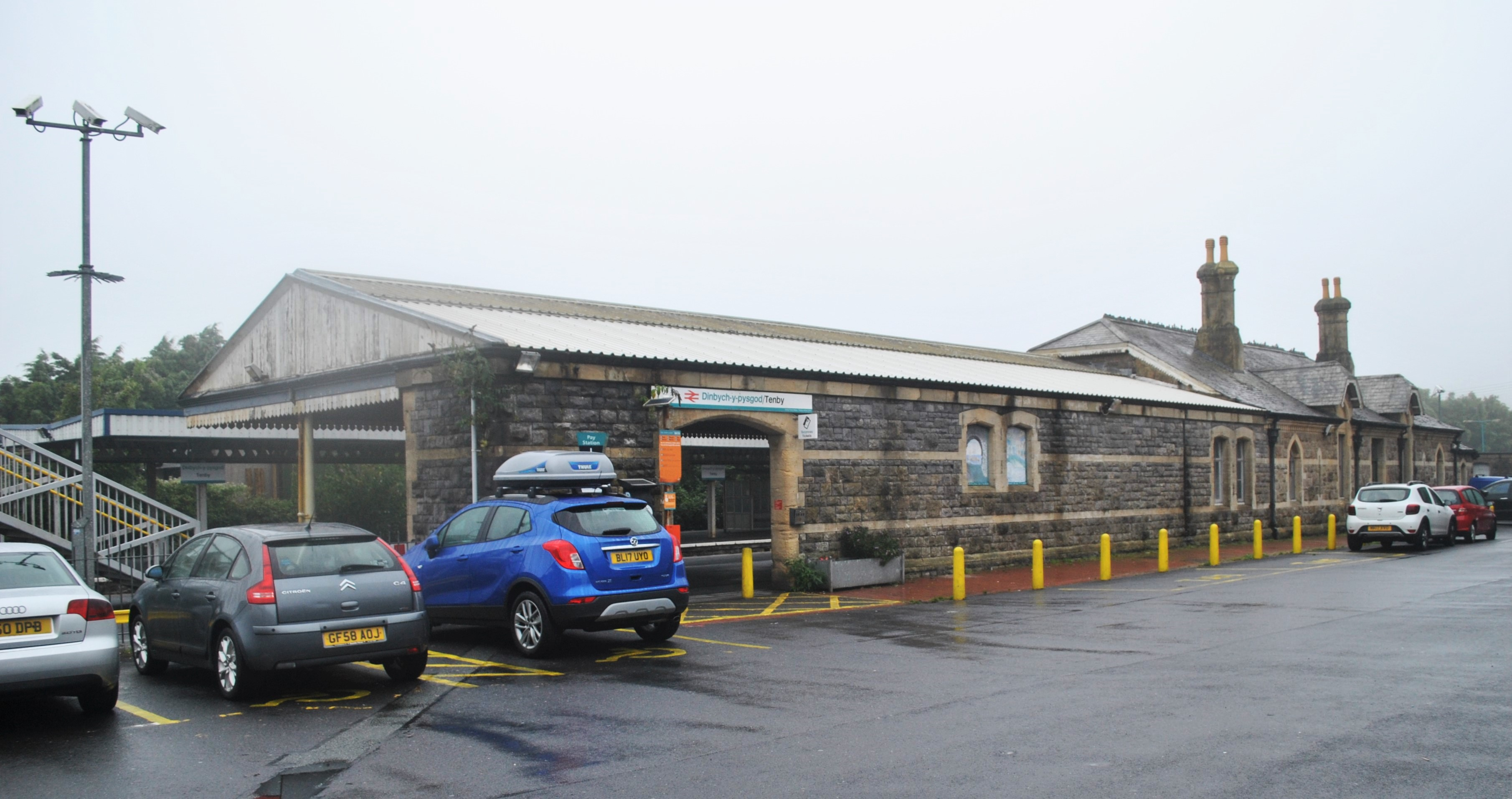

General information
- Location: Tenby, Pembrokeshire; Wales
- Coordinates: 51°40′21″N 4°42′24″W
- Grid reference: SN129005
- Manager: Transport for Wales
- Platforms: 2

Other information
- Station code: TEN
- Classification: DfT category F1

History
- Original company: Pembroke and Tenby Railway
- Pre-grouping: Great Western Railway
- Post-grouping: Great Western Railway

Key dates
- 30 July 1863: First station opened
- 4 September 1866: Station resited

Passengers
- 2020/21: ▼16,246
- 2021/22: ▲70,580
- 2022/23: ▲93,206
- 2023/24: ▲0.105 million
- 2024/25: ▲0.133 million

Listed Building – Grade II
- Feature: Tenby Railway Station
- Designated: 28 March 2002
- Reference no.: 26424
Location
Notes
- Passenger statistics from the Office of Rail and Road

Tenby railway station in Tenby is on the Pembroke Dock branch of the West Wales Line operated by Transport for Wales Rail, who also manage the station. Trains call here every two hours in each direction, westwards towards Pembroke and eastwards to Whitland, Carmarthen and Swansea.

== History ==
The first station at Tenby was opened by the Pembroke and Tenby Railway as the terminus of a line from Pembroke on 6 August 1863.

This original terminus station was low-lying and when the decision was made to extend the line to Whitland, a new railway was constructed from the existing Pembroke and Tenby line, at a point called Black Rock Junction, which then climbed to the higher level necessary for the extension. To the north of the station is a viaduct carrying the line towards Whitland. It has seven arches and is 136 yards (125 metres) in length. It is a Grade II listed structure. The new Tenby station was opened on 4 September 1866. The original station was then used for freight traffic and became known as "Tenby Lower Yard". It was closed and removed in 1965.

The present station buildings date from 1871 and were designed by James Szlumper and built in Bath stone. The original cast iron canopy is still in place. A later passenger footbridge now links the two platforms.

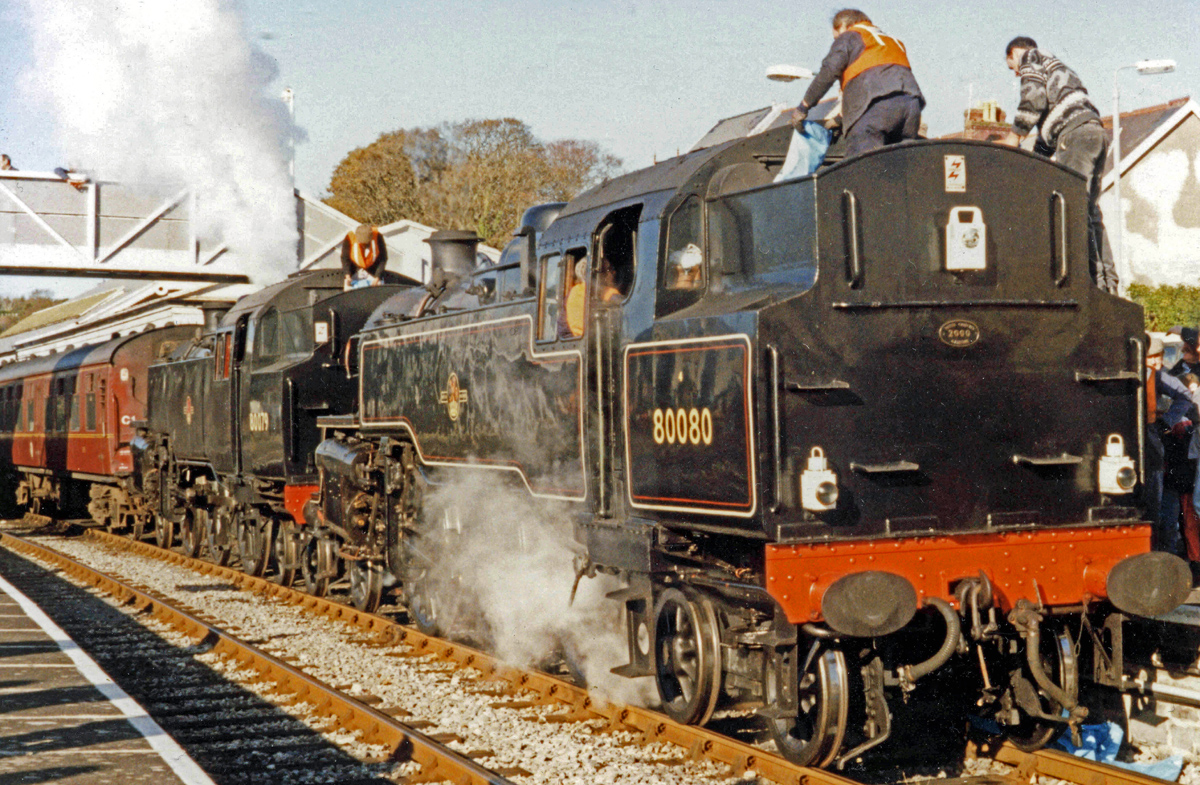
Steam excursion train from Pembroke Dock to Swansea at Tenby station (1993)

Tenby has had two signal boxes. The first, of timber construction, opened in 1895 and closed in 1956. Its successor opened in 1956 and closed in 1988.

The only passing loop on the Whitland to Pembroke Dock branch is located at Tenby, allowing east and westbound trains to pass here. As there is no longer a signal box at the station, the electric token instruments for the block sections on either side are operated by the train crew under the supervision of the Whitland signaller (a similar system operates on the Heart of Wales Line). Tenby has the first application of motor points worked directly by the token system.

== Facilities ==
The station is unstaffed but has a ticket machine. There is a shelter on the eastbound platform in addition to the canopies on each side. Train running information is available via digital display screens, a help point on platform 2, timetable posters and by telephone. There is a payphone in the station car park. The platforms are linked by footbridge, but wheelchair and mobility impaired users may reach the eastbound platform by means of a barrow crossing (with assistance). Level access is available from the car park to the westbound platform.

In February 2025, it was reported that plans had been submitted to install an accessible footbridge as the station is not compliant with the Equality Act 2010. Work on the project is expected to begin in December and be completed by Christmas 2026.

== Services ==
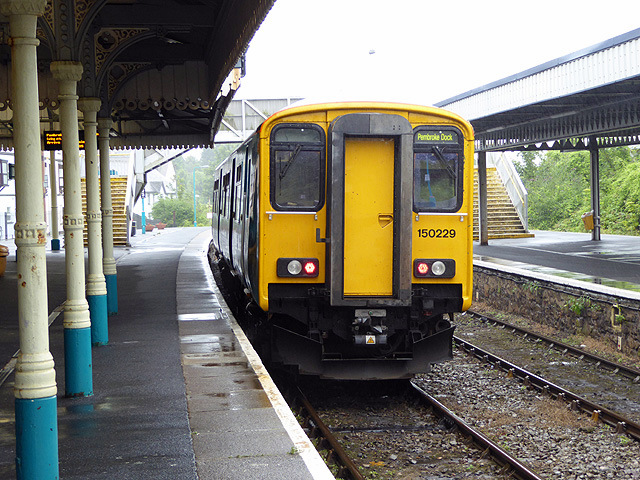
An Arriva Trains Wales Class 150 with a service to Pembroke Dock

The station is served by the Swansea to Pembroke Dock local trains, which run approximately every two hours each way with some additional peak services. Some early morning and late night trains run only as far as Carmarthen. There are two trains each way from Manchester Piccadilly. On summer Saturdays, there is one train each way between London Paddington and Pembroke Dock. There is a Sunday service of five trains per day.

Preceding station	National Rail	Following station
Saundersfoot	Transport for Wales; West Wales Line	Penally
Saundersfoot	Great Western Railway; London – Pembroke	Penally
