= Pembroke Coast Express =

UK passenger train service

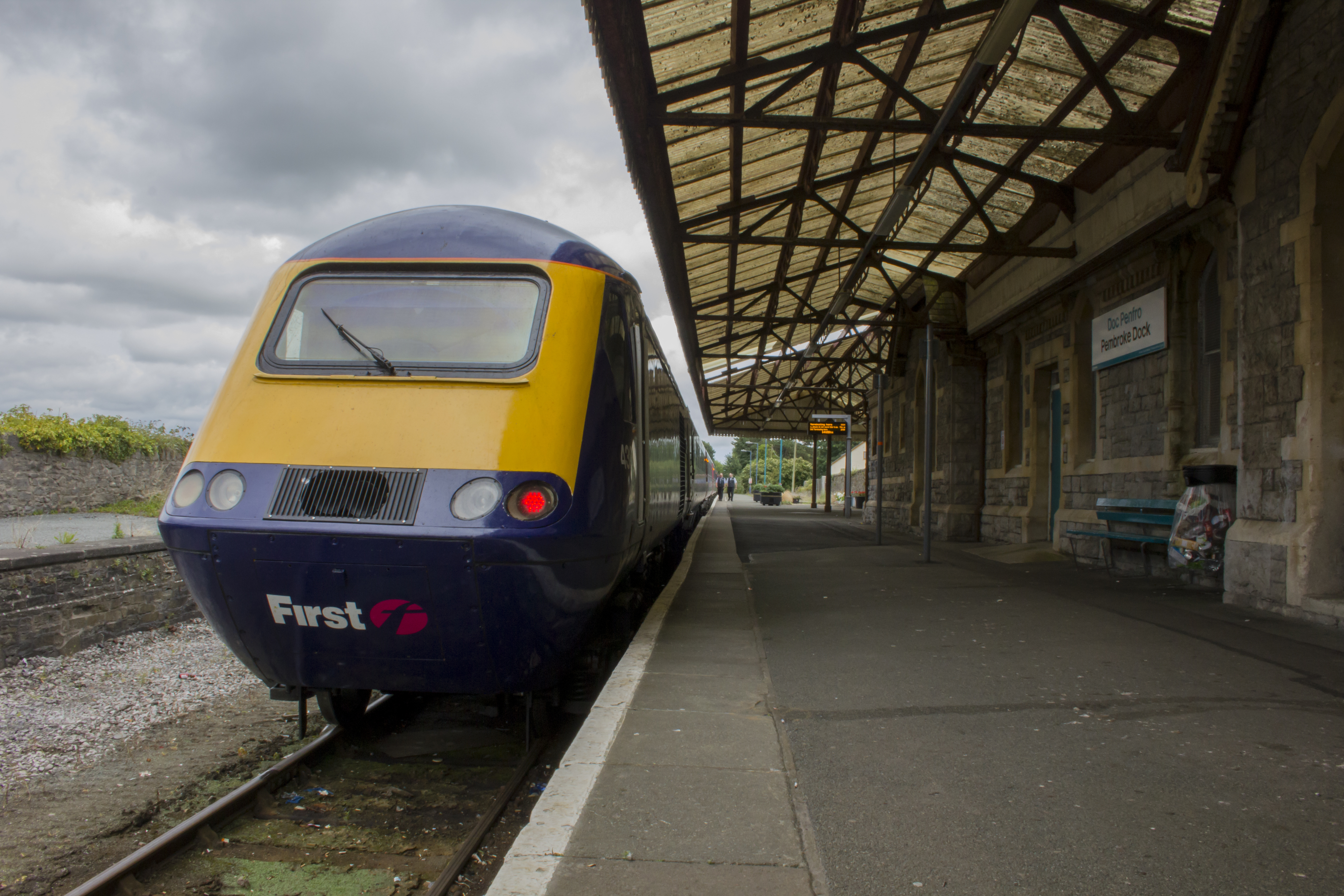
- A Great Western Railway HST at Pembroke Dock

Overview
- Service type: Passenger train
- First service: 1953
- Current operator: Great Western Railway
- Former operators: InterCity Great Western; British Rail; Great Western Railway

Route
- Termini: London Paddington; Pembroke Dock
- Service frequency: Summer Saturdays
- Lines used: Great Western; South Wales; West Wales

Technical
- Rolling stock: Class 802
- Operating speed: 125 mph

The Pembroke Coast Express was a named train operated by British Railways which began running in 1953 along with several other services, as a way of better promoting faster or more direct services. In 2006, the name was used by First Great Western to advertise its Summer Saturday service between London Paddington and Pembroke Dock.

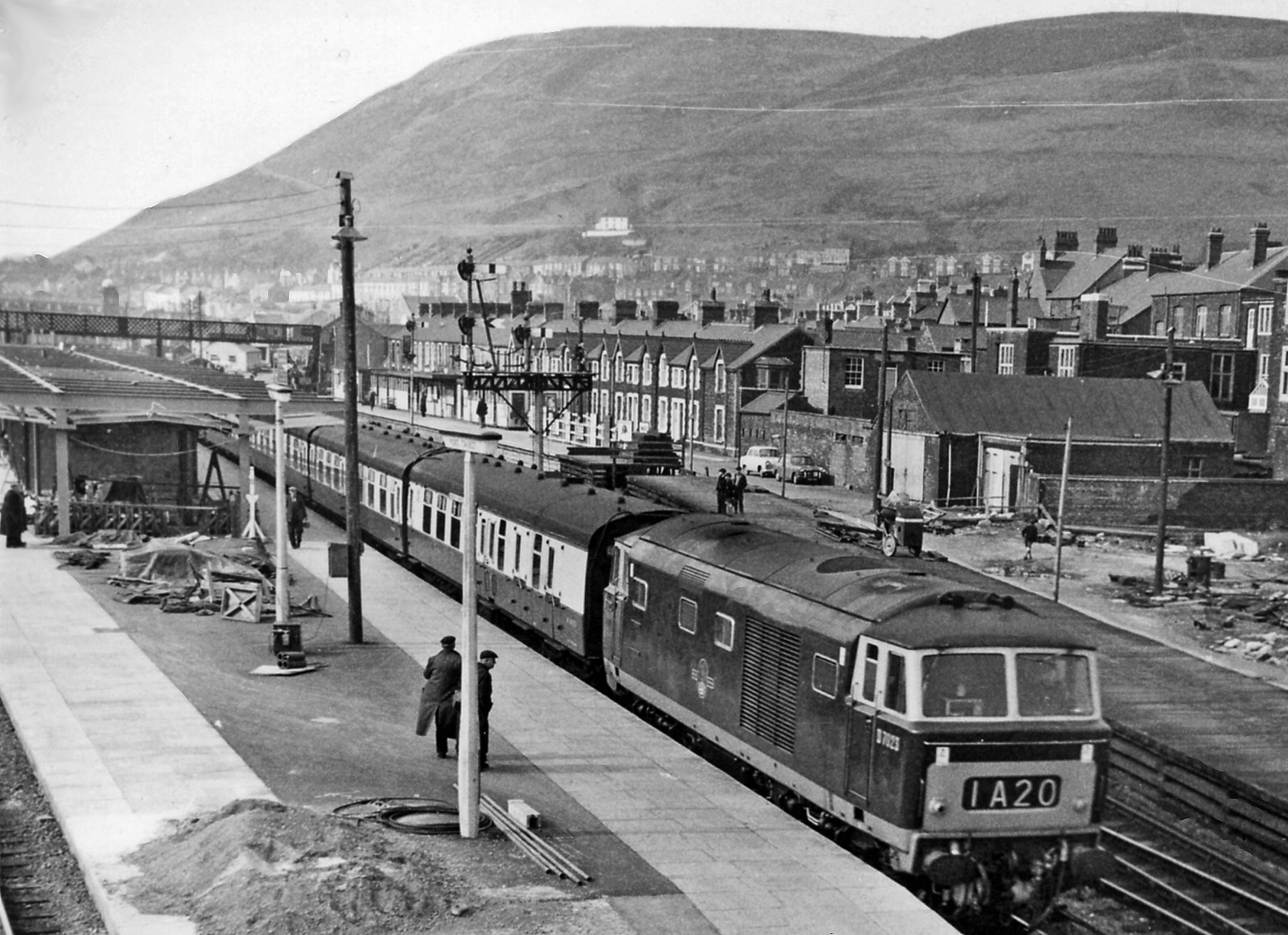
An up service to London Paddington passes Port Talbot in 1962

== Current operation ==
Since 2006 First Great Western has operated the service between London Paddington and Pembroke Dock on every Saturday in the summer timetable. The services from Pembroke Dock depart at 10:02 and 15:02, and the service from London Paddington departs at 08:48.
