= Sarnau railway station =

Former railway station in Wales

Sarnau

General information
- Location: Bancyfelin, Carmarthenshire; Wales
- Coordinates: 51.8416°N 4.4161°W
- Grid reference: SN336186
- Platforms: 2

Other information
- Status: Disused

History
- Original company: South Wales Railway
- Pre-grouping: Great Western Railway
- Post-grouping: Great Western Railway

Key dates
- 2 January 1854: Station opened
- 15 June 1964: Station closed
Location

Sarnau railway station served the village of Bancyfelin, Carmarthenshire, Wales; it was close to the hamlet of Sarnau. It was on the West Wales Line.

== History ==
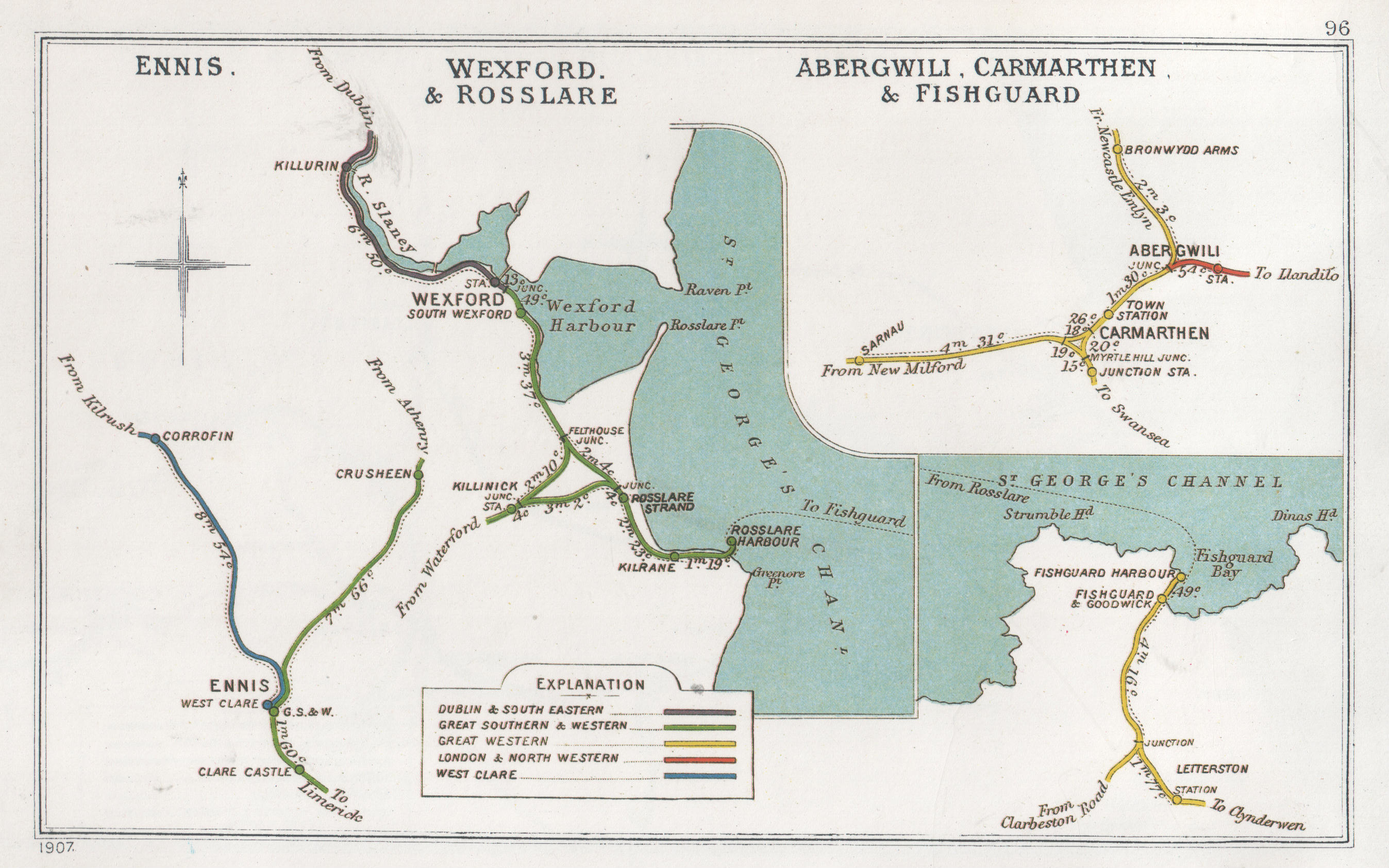
A 1907 Railway Clearing House Junction Diagram showing (upper right) railways in the vicinity of Sarnau

The station opened on 2 January 1854. It was on the section of the South Wales Railway which opened that day between the temporary station near Carmarthen and Haverfordwest, and was situated between Carmarthen and St Clears.

The station closed on 15 June 1964.

== Routes ==
Preceding station	Historical railways	Following station
Carmarthen; Line and station open	Great Western Railway; South Wales Railway	St Clears; Line open, station closed
