= Whitland railway station =

Railway station in Carmarthenshire, Wales

Whitland Welsh: Hendy-gwyn ar Daf
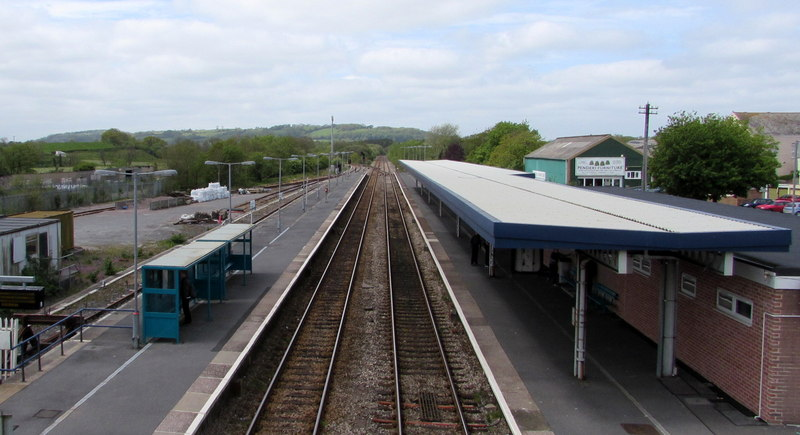
- The station as seen from footbridge (2015)

General information
- Location: Whitland, Carmarthenshire; Wales
- Coordinates: 51.818°N 4.614°W
- Grid reference: SN198165
- Manager: Transport for Wales Rail
- Platforms: 3

Other information
- Station code: WTL
- Classification: DfT category F1

History
- Original company: South Wales Railway
- Pre-grouping: Great Western Railway
- Post-grouping: Great Western Railway

Key dates
- 2 January 1854: SWR station opened
- 4 September 1866: P&T station opened
- August 1869: P&T station closed

Passengers
- 2021/22: ▲29,698
- Interchange: ▲1,610
- 2022/23: ▲35,350
- Interchange: ▼1,589
- 2023/24: ▲38,690
- Interchange: ▼1,503
- 2024/25: ▲44,580
- Interchange: ▲2,752
- 2025/26: ▲50,752
- Interchange: ▼2,368
Location
Notes
- Passenger statistics from the Office of Rail and Road

Whitland railway station serves the town of Whitland in Carmarthenshire, Wales. It is located on the West Wales Line from Swansea. To the west of the station, a branch line diverges towards Pembroke; the main line continues to Milford Haven and Fishguard Harbour. The Whitland and Cardigan Railway (closed in 1962) diverged from the Fishguard/Milford Haven line 2 miles (3.2 km) west of Whitland.

Passenger services are operated by Transport for Wales Rail, who, as of 2024, mostly use their new Class 197s, and Great Western Railway who run services using Class 800 trains on summer Saturdays from London Paddington to Pembroke Dock.

== History ==
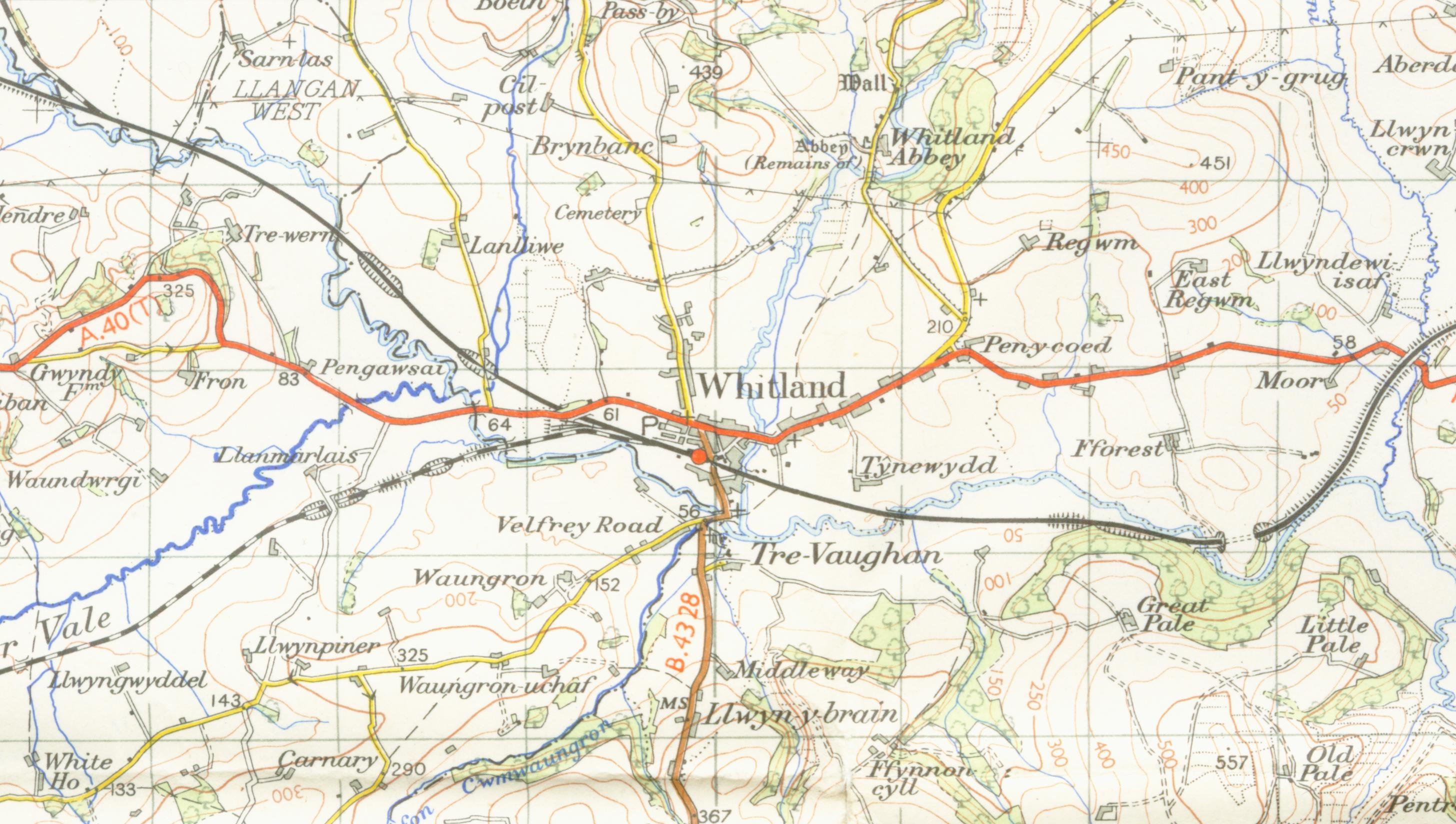
Map from 1952 of the area near Whitland railway station showing the junction between the three lines

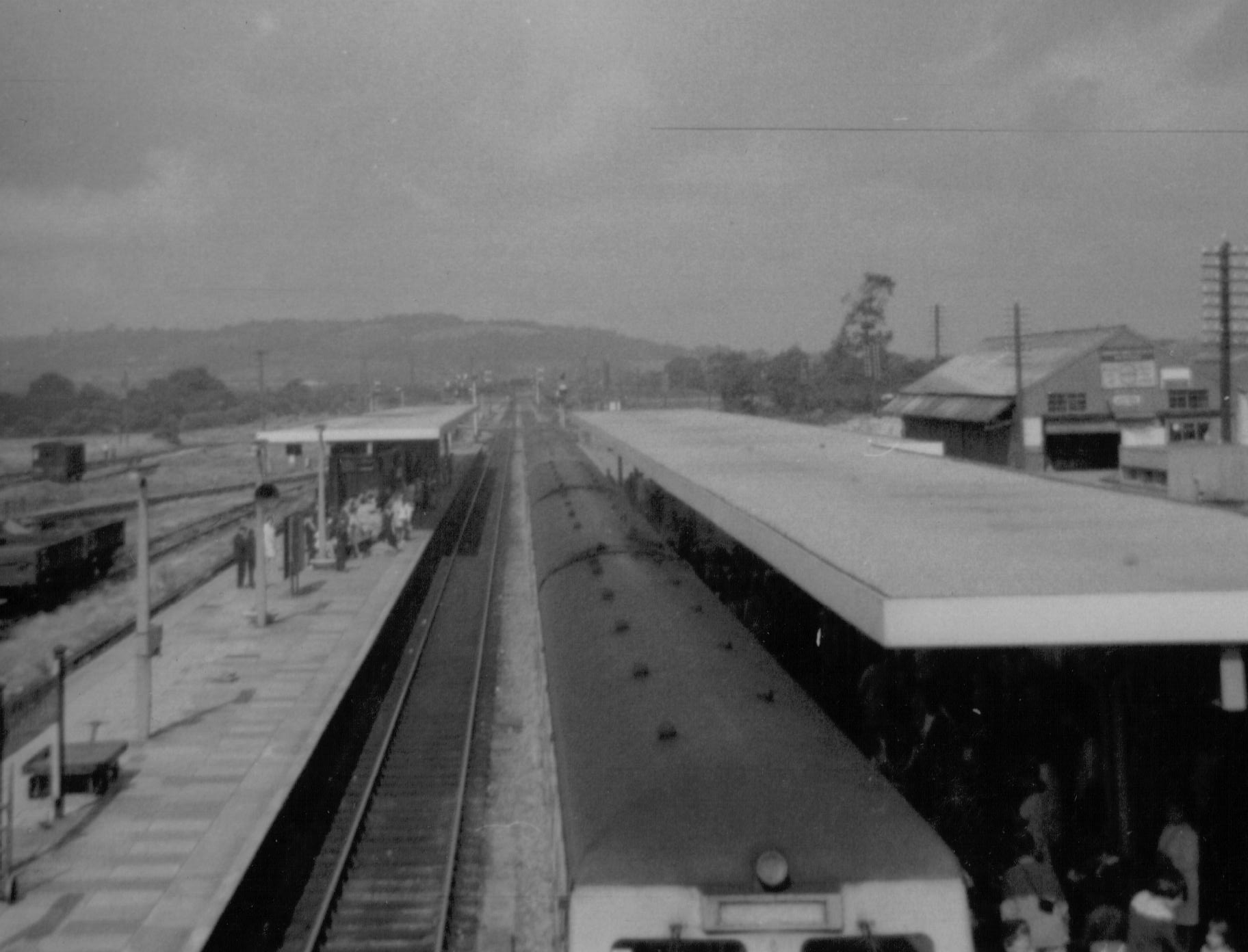
Whitland station in August 1971 with a train for Carmarthen

The station was opened by the South Wales Railway on 2 January 1854 as part of their route from Cardiff to Haverfordwest and to Neyland two years later. A branch line to Milford Haven followed in 1863 and the Pembroke and Tenby Railway (P&T) arrived from Tenby in 1866; their route was built as standard gauge, rather than the SWR's broad gauge, and so initially the P&T had to terminate at its own station next to the main line one, which by now was owned by the Great Western Railway. This separate P&T station had opened on 4 September 1866 and was closed in August 1869. A single line was converted to dual gauge in 1868 to allow P&T trains to reach Carmarthen. Full-through-running trains between the two routes was made possible in 1872 with the conversion of the main line to standard gauge. The network in the area was completed when the Cardigan branch was opened in stages between 1873 and 1886.

From 1957 the station was rebuilt. On the up side it had a ticket hall, waiting room with refreshments, ladies waiting room, toilets, stationmaster's office, district inspector's office, parcels office, central heating, and a 320 ft (98 m) steel and aluminium platform canopy. On the down side it had a 270 ft (82 m) canopy, refreshment room and toilets.

== Services ==
The station has an approximately hourly service (including Sundays) to and from Carmarthen and Swansea eastbound and every two hours westbound to each of Milford Haven and Pembroke Dock. Certain eastbound services continue onwards to Cardiff Central, Hereford and Manchester Piccadilly.

The services between Fishguard Harbour and Carmarthen (and stations further afield) also call (eight trains per day Mon-Sat, with 1 on Sundays, plus a 6-days-a-week night time service). Summer Saturday Class 800 services between London Paddington and Pembroke Dock also serve Whitland.

=== Rail and sea corridor to Ireland ===
Transport for Wales Rail boat trains to and from Fishguard Harbour serve the station. These connect with the Stena Line ferry to Rosslare Europort in Ireland with a daily morning and evening service in both directions. This route has been in existence since 1906.

Preceding station	National Rail	Following station
Carmarthen	Transport for Wales; West Wales Line - Pembroke branch	Narberth
Carmarthen	Transport for Wales; West Wales line - Milford Haven and Fishguard branches	Clunderwen
Carmarthen	Great Western Railway; London - Pembroke	Saundersfoot Or Narberth
	Historical railways	
St Clears; Line open, station closed	Great Western Railway; South Wales Railway	Clunderwen; Line and station open
	Disused railways	
Terminus	Great Western Railway; Whitland & Cardigan Railway	Llanfalteg Halt; Line and station closed

== Facilities ==
Despite being a once-major junction, the facilities at Whitland station are limited. There are neither toilet nor waiting room facilities available. The main building located on the eastbound platform once contained a waiting room and ticket office, but is now closed and boarded up (tickets must therefore be purchased on board the train or prior to travel). Most of this platform is covered by a canopy, and west of the building rusting rails remain in one of the former bay platforms. Across the footbridge, waiting shelters are provided on the westbound platform. There is in fact a serviceable bay platform behind this, accessed from the Pembroke Dock branch, but this is seldom used for passenger trains as services from the branch do not normally terminate at Whitland.

Train running information is provided by timetable posters, digital display screens and a customer help point on each side. Step-free access is available to both operational platforms, though the eastbound one is via a steep ramp.
