= Pembroke Dock railway station =

Railway station in Pembrokeshire, Wales

Pembroke Dock Welsh: Doc Penfro
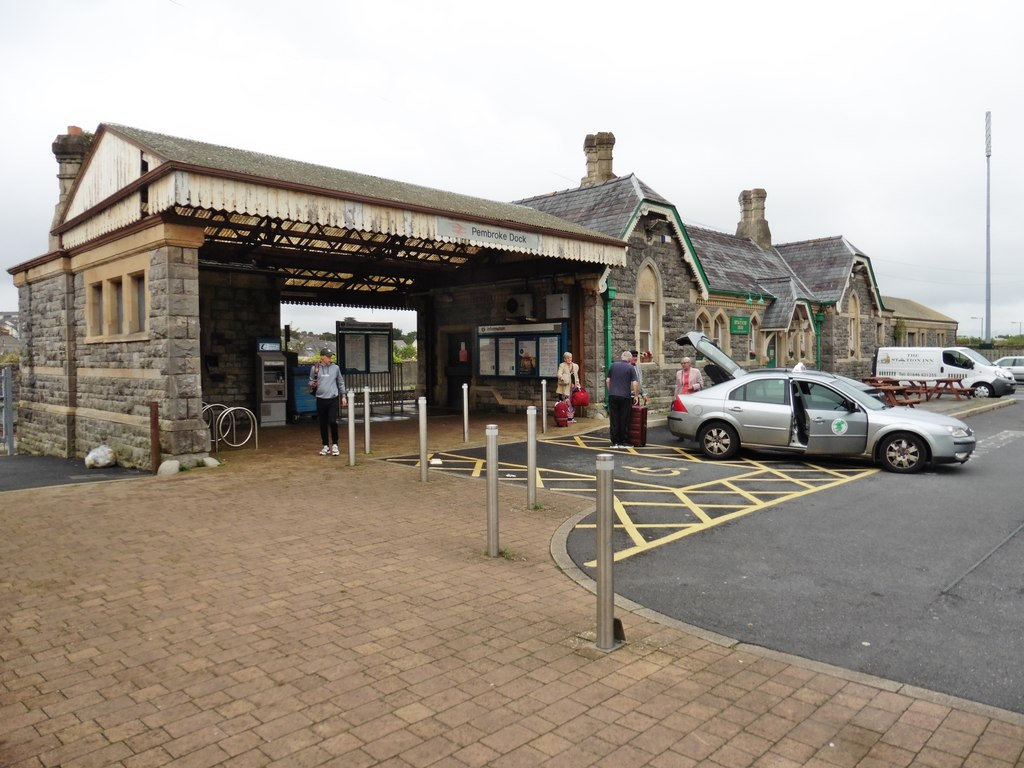
- The station building at Pembroke Dock

General information
- Location: Pembroke Dock, Pembrokeshire; Wales
- Coordinates: 51.694°N 4.938°W
- Grid reference: SM970035
- Manager: Transport for Wales
- Platforms: 1

Other information
- Station code: PMD
- Classification: DfT category F1

History
- Original company: Pembroke and Tenby Railway
- Pre-grouping: Great Western Railway
- Post-grouping: Great Western Railway

Key dates
- 8 August 1864: Station opened

Passengers
- 2021/22: ▲22,624
- 2022/23: ▲32,956
- 2023/24: ▲38,268
- 2024/25: ▲46,394
- 2025/26: ▼44,886
Location
Notes
- Passenger statistics from the Office of Rail and Road

Pembroke Dock railway station serves the town of Pembroke Dock in Pembrokeshire, Wales. It is the terminus of the Pembroke Dock branch of West Wales Lines from Swansea, 27 1/4 miles (44 km) southwest of Whitland.

== History ==
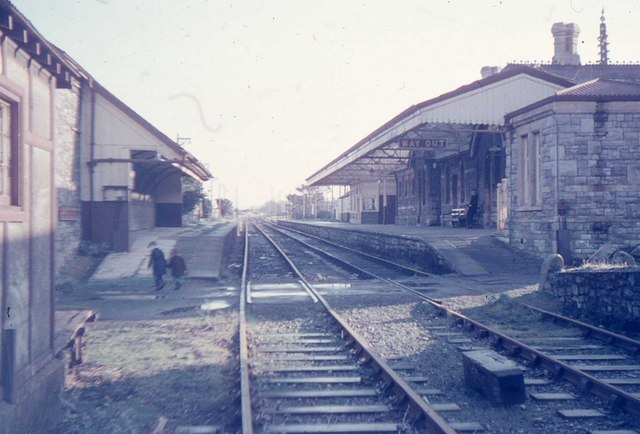
The station in January 1968

It was opened on 8 August 1864 by the Pembroke and Tenby Railway as an extension of their route from Pembroke to serve the Royal Navy dockyard in the town, though it was not until 1866 that the P&T route finally reached the main line at Whitland. When constructed, the line was notable having been built as standard gauge, not the 7-foot broad gauge used by the Great Western Railway at the time; and so it was isolated from the South Wales Railway main line until 1868, when dual gauge track was laid as far as Carmarthen to meet the standard gauge tracks of the London and North Western Railway. In 1872, the GWR converted all of its lines in the area to standard gauge.

Originally, the station had two platforms. Both remain but only the southern one is in use (the track serving the other has now been removed). Part of the main building has been converted into The Station Inn, a real ale pub. Originally carrying munitions, the freight branch ran past the station across local streets down to the actual dockside until 1969. Subsequently, albeit partially, the track has been lifted. Coal trains to Pembroke Dock ran until the end oft 1978. The twice-weekly service had become uneconomic: in 1969, almost 800 wagons carrying over 10,000 tons of coal had been carried, compared with only 218 wagons with 3,500 tonnes of coal in the first nine months of 1978.

In 2020, the Grade II listed building was regenerated as part of the £24 million Wales Station Improvement Scheme. The work (by AmcoGiffen) included the replacement of discoloured glazing in the station canopies with wired multi-link polycarbonate sheeting which enabled the historic design and character of the station to be retained.

== Facilities ==
Transport for Wales Rail is the operator; the station is unstaffed; ticket machine is installed; CIS displays provide train running information in addition to the standard timetable poster boards and public telephone. The station canopies remain to provide a covered waiting area with bench seating. There are no waiting rooms. Level access is available from the car park and at the main entrance to the platform.

== Services ==
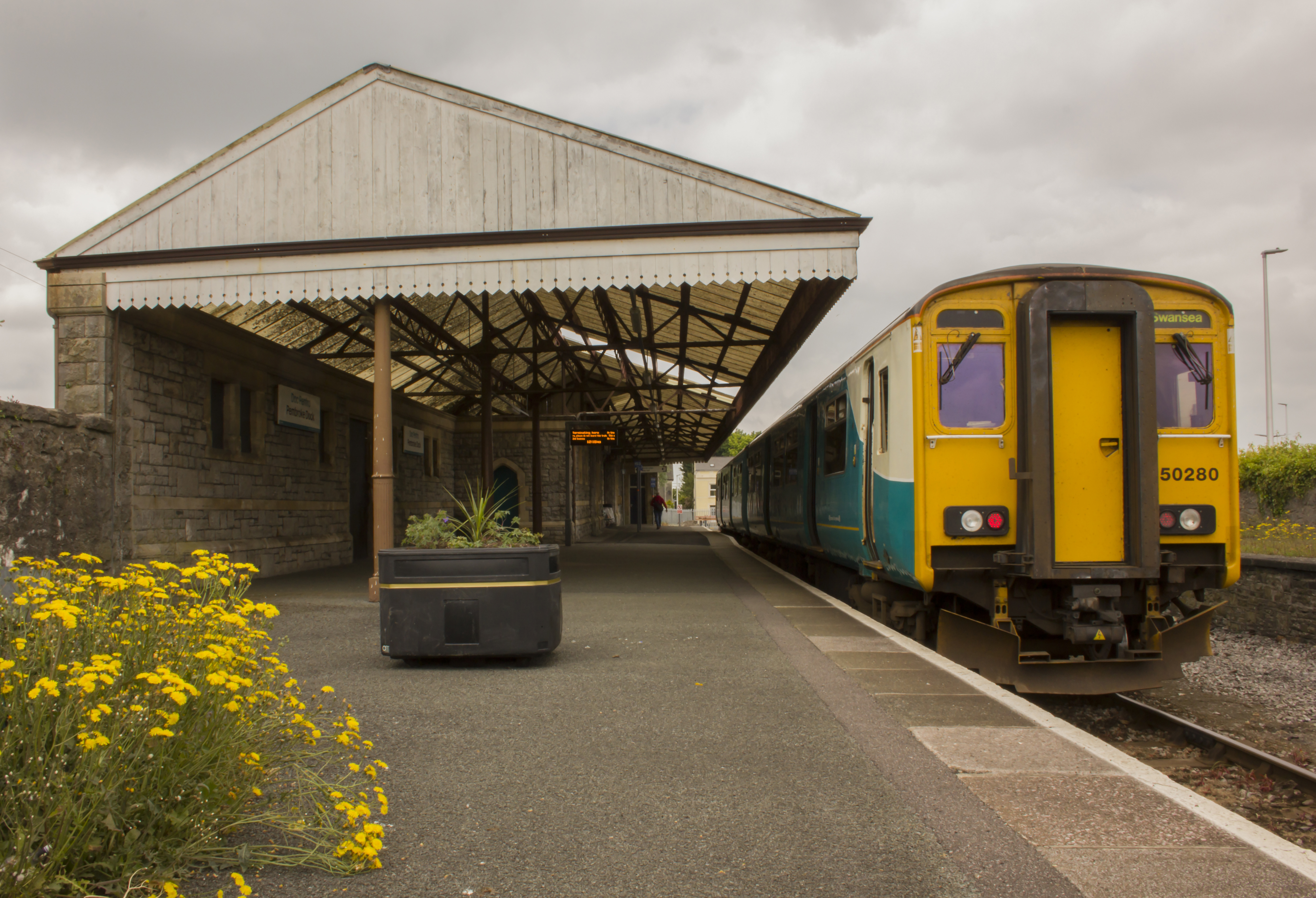
An Arriva Trains Wales Class 150 with a service to Swansea

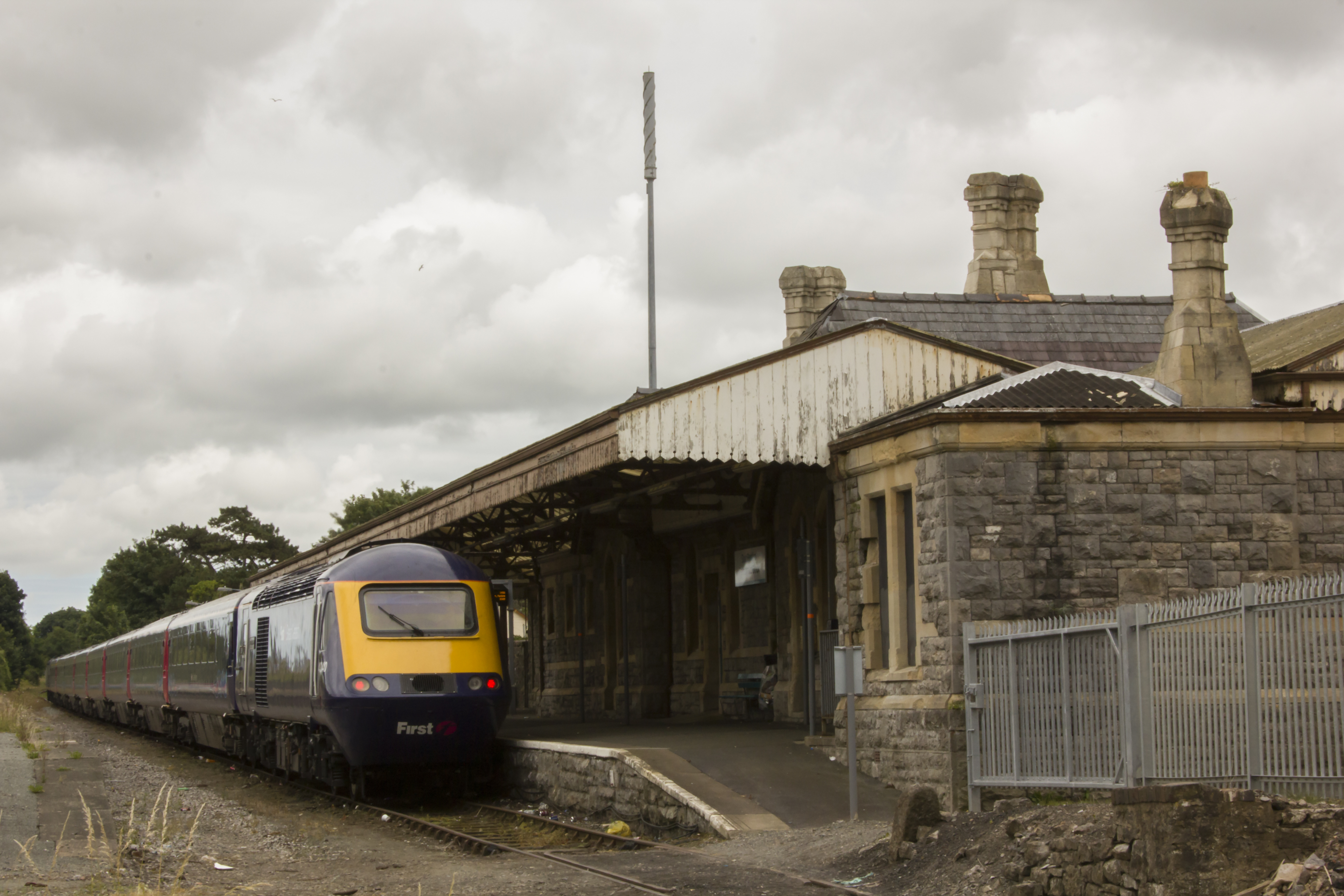
Great Western Railway InterCity 125 having arrived from London Paddington

There is a regular daily service to/from Swansea via Carmarthen and Whitland, with some through trains to/from Cardiff Central and further east (one service originating at Manchester Piccadilly). Connections are available at Swansea for mainline destinations at other times. Trains run every two hours Mon-Sat, with a less frequent service on Sundays.

On summer Saturdays, the station is served by Great Western Railway who provide two trains to London Paddington. One train arrives from London Paddington and one train starts in the morning at Swansea. The service is named as the Pembroke Coast Express and until 2019, it was operated by InterCity 125 HST sets which have now been replaced by new Class 800 trains.

Preceding station	National Rail	Following station
Pembroke	Transport for Wales; West Wales line	Terminus
Pembroke	Great Western Railway; London – Pembroke; Summer Saturdays	Terminus
	Ferry services	
Terminus	Irish Ferries; Ferry	Rosslare Europort
