= South London Route Utilisation Strategy =

Network Rail's (NR) South London Route Utilisation Strategy (SLRUS), published in March 2008 (SLRUS) was the eighth Route Utilisation Strategy to be produced. By default, RUSs are established by the Office of Rail Regulation (ORR) unless the latter objects within 60 days. The RUS is included in NR's map as established.

The scope includes the London suburban lines of Strategic Route 1 - Kent, including lines as far as Hayes, Sevenoaks and Rochester (but excluding the Swanley-Rochester line) and those of Route 2 - Brighton Main Line and Sussex, including lines as far as Horsham (via Dorking), Epsom Downs, Purley (plus the branches to Tattenham Corner and Caterham), East Grinstead and Uckfield. Where routes are four-tracked the fast lines are generally excluded. As such the routes are heavily short/medium distance commuter routes into London, but there are some freight services as well. The lines excluded from Routes 1 and 2 are to be covered in the Kent RUS and the Sussex RUS.

As with other RUSs, the SLRUS took into account a number of responses, including the Office of Rail Regulation (ORR).

Some issues are closely related to other published RUSs: South West Main Line RUS, Cross London RUS; Freight RUS; East Coast Main Line RUS. The Strategic Rail Authority's (SRA) Brighton Main Line (BML) RUS, published February 2006, as superseded by the Department for Transport's (DfT) consultation and briefing, led to changes in the December 2008 timetable; the most important of these is the change to the Gatwick Express service in the morning peak. The Kent, Sussex and East Midlands RUSs will have some interfaces with the SLRUS.

== Timescales and related projects ==
The RUS needs to be seen against existing contingent and prospective schemes, most notably the Thameslink project and the East London Line (ELL) extension (ELLx). Thameslink will see a step-change in services continuing through central London onto the network north of London, which are currently limited to 15 trains per hour in each direction (tph) at 8-car length; many interventions identified in the SLRUS are interdependent with certain works in this programme. Phase 1 of the ELL extension (ELLx1), already authorised at time of SLRUS publication, will incorporate new services on the lines from West Croydon and Crystal Palace to New Cross Gate; Phase 2 (authorised in February 2009) will incorporate new services on a route from Clapham Junction to Surrey Quays via a currently freight-only line, the South London Line, and a reinstated disused alignment. In addition Crossrail would interact with the RUS area at Abbey Wood from 2017 (at the earliest). Another project that does not directly form part of the RUS area but has a knock-on effect certainly to passenger services and possibly to freight services is High Speed One (HS1).

Largely because of these interdependencies the timescale of the SLRUS, while divided into a short, medium and long term, does not coincide with NR's Control Periods (CP) as is usual with RUSs. The short term is up to 2010 to coincide with the introduction of the December 2009 timetable. There are really three medium term timescales

- up to 2012 when much train lengthening is recommended to have been implemented, and Thameslink Key Output 1 is scheduled to be completed
- up to 2015 when Thameslink Key Output 2 is scheduled to be completed
- immediately beyond 2015 when the full Thameslink 24tph becomes operational

A longer term timescale corresponding approximately with the remainder of CP4 and CP5 (commencing April 2019) and beyond is examined.

Apart from the prerequisites to train lengthening, mainly platform lengthening, increased depot capacity and power upgrades, the medium term interventions involve little infrastructure apart from the heavy undertakings within the contingent projects described above.

== Short term ==
Three major projects affect the situation in the short term:

1. the reconstruction of Blackfriars Thameslink station
2. the starting of domestic passenger services on High Speed 1, scheduled for December 2009
3. the re-opening of the extended ELL, scheduled for June 2010

The reconstruction of Blackfriars The commencement of works (in March 2009) results in the closure of the south-facing terminating platforms, 1 to 3, on the east side of the station. Consequently, all services need to continue north through Blackfriars. A recasting of services is necessary and, as this location is the boundary between the overhead-line and third-rail electrification area, additional dual-voltage stock is required.

High Speed One Originally, with the prospect of re-routing services from east Kent to London to use High Speed One, some service frequencies elsewhere on the Southeastern franchise were to be reduced. The RUS recommends retaining approximate the previous service levels on the classic lines.

The southern extension of ELL The East London Line Phase 1 extension (ELLx1) south of New Cross Gate will use the slow lines to serve all stations through Norwood Junction, where there is a branch to Crystal Palace, to West Croydon. This requires a major recasting of the South Central franchise timetables.

=== Southern Central franchise area ===
At the time of SLRUS publication, the preparation for the process of refranchising of services on the South Central area was well underway. The DfT would take the recommendations of the RUS into account when specifying the franchise. Off-peak services were not a priority for the RUS, but the franchising process would carefully consider these services. The DfT subsequently (in May 2008) issued a briefing document in respect of the process, and identified service level commitments (SLC) which closely corresponded with the schedule highlighted in the RUS as follows:

- SLC1 September 2009 – May 2010, more or less the pre-existing timetable
- SLC2 May 2010 – October 2012, to provide for ELLx1
- SLC3 October 2012 to the end of the franchise, to provide for an appropriate service pattern during redevelopment of London Bridge

As SLC2 had to include provision for ELLx1, that in turn would have extensive impact on other aspects of the timetable, which need to be consistent with the following service levels and outline timetable:

- 10tph on the Sydenham route to the ELL
- the displacement of the 2tph Wallington line services to London Bridge to the fast lines
- 4tph Norwood Junction to London Bridge
- on the Sydenham line into London Bridge 6tph in the peak three hours
- from both the Streatham Common and West Norwood lines, 2tph via Tulse Hill to London Bridge
- 2tph from the Sydenham line to Victoria via Crystal Palace, including in the peaks
- 6tph from the Streatham Common route to Victoria
- repeating peak hour standard timetable for East Croydon
- retention of Denmark Hill to London Bridge service for the time being
- 2tph in peak times from South Croydon to Shepherds Bush
- Tattenham Corner and Caterham peak-hour trains to split/join at Purley
- additional services in the Redhill corridor

SLC3 is dealt with below as part of the medium term.

=== Southeastern ===
At the time of the awarding of the Integrated Kent franchise, Southeastern undertook to provide services according to two phases of service level commitments (SLC): SLC1, the immediate level of services; SLC2, the mix of services to be provided once high-speed domestic services began over HS1, scheduled for December 2009. In the latter service mix, a net reduction of services over the 'classic' (i.e. non-HS1) routes was envisaged. However the SLRUS concluded that, owing mainly to the growth in traffic, the overall level of services over the classic routes be broadly retained. By the time of RUS publication, this had been agreed by DfT and Southeastern as regards the Hayes, Sidcup, Bexleyheath, Greenwich and Chislehurst slow lines. The timetable will still need to be revamped to accommodate the HS1 services from Medway and east Kent.

=== Thameslink route ===
The RUS recommends 14tph through Blackfriars towards Farringdon:

- 4tph, 2 clockwise, 2 anti-clockwise round the Wimbledon loop
- 2tph non-stop from East Croydon via Herne Hill
- 4tph from the Catford route
- 1tph from the Medway area, 1tph from Maidstone, both via Bromley South and (not stopping) via Catford
- 2tph from Kent House.

Because of scarcity of dual-voltage rolling stock, some shoulder peak trains may run at less than 8-car formation.

== Medium term ==
In the medium term the RUS recommends widespread train and platform lengthening, combined with station improvements to relieve congestion, all concentrated particularly into the near-medium term. The withdrawal of the South London line Victoria-London Bridge local service is recommended, to be replaced by the East London Line Phase 2 Extension (ELLx2) and a Victoria-Bellingham service. Other services patterns will change a number of times in the period according to the availability of infrastructure.

=== Medium term, 2010-12 ===
The main recommendation in this period is for train and consequent platform lengthening, to 10 cars on most Southern Central suburban routes and 12 cars on most Southeastern suburban routes into London Bridge. The lengthening works are required before reconstruction works begin at London Bridge. These in turn have implications for power supply and deporting.

This period also corresponds with the delivery to completion of Thameslink Key Output 1, which will facilitate 16tph at maximum 12-car length. This will include an expanded interchange with the London Underground and a new entrance on the south bank of the River Thames.

Brighton Main Line (BML) services to Thameslink will all run via Herne Hill (not London Bridge) with peak direction services as follows:

- 2tph Brighton, 2tph Three Bridges via Redhill, all running non-stop from East Croydon
- 4tph Wimbledon loop
- 2tph Kent House
- 2tph Sevenoaks, 2tph Orpington, all stopping via Catford
- 1tph from the Medway area, 1tph from Maidstone, both fast via Bromley South

==== East London Line Phase 2 Extension (ELLx2) ====
The SLRUS recommends early implementation of the ELL branch from Surrey Quays to Clapham Junction. It would serve the South London Line (SLL) stations of Wandsworth Road, Clapham High Street (both with increased frequency of 4tph), Denmark Hill, Peckham Rye and Queens Road Peckham; this would mitigate the effects of withdrawal of the SLL route from Victoria to London Bridge, which the RUS states is inevitable for a number of reasons, including its unsustainability into London Bridge during the latter's redevelopment (starting in 2012). ELLx2 would also provide access from Clapham Junction and the above SLL stations to destinations east of London Bridge on both sides of the river, potentially relieving pressure on London Bridge for significant numbers of passengers.

=== Medium term, 2012-15 ===
This period corresponds with the commencement of the process of delivery of Thameslink Key Output 2, mainly the redevelopment of London Bridge station and directly related works on both east and west approaches.

This will reduce capacity in and through London Bridge station. During the works capacity into the terminating platforms will be 20tph. A number of interventions are required, including diversion of services to the Thameslink route via Herne Hill, and encouraging passengers to travel to Victoria.

=== Medium term, to immediately beyond 2015 ===
The completion of Thameslink Key Output 2 will facilitate 24tph at maximum 12-car length. The full north–south routing and timetabling need to be developed. All principal stations served should have 4tph.

The capacity into and through London Bridge is estimated as a total of 86tph broken down as follows:

- 20tph into the terminating platforms
- 18tph via the through platforms to Thameslink
- 28tph via the through platforms to Charing Cross
- 20tph via the through platforms to Cannon Street

All London Bridge trains will need to be run at their full possible length to maintain capacity. East Grinstead and Uckfield trains should split and joining at Oxted, served by diesel trains. Frequency will need to be reduced on services via Sydenham and via Tulse Hill.

The service via Thameslink towards the south is foreseen to be as follows:

via London Bridge

- 4tph Brighton main line
- 4tph Redhill corridor
- 4tph Kent main line
- 2tph East Grinstead
- 4tph Sydenham route stopping.

via Elephant & Castle

- 4tph Catford loop stopping
- 2tph Medway and/or Maidstone line semi-fast.

The RUS did not specify the northern terminating points from Thameslink.

An indicative schedule of the services into the terminating platforms at London Bridge was given.

The total service level into Charing Cross will be roughly as today, but with modified individual routes, though all services will be able to call at London Bridge. The total service level into Cannon Street will be somewhat reduced.

Even with all these interventions, some peak crowding will remain. Some train lengthening beyond that provided 2010-1015 is likely to be required.

== Longer term (2019 and beyond) ==
In the longer term further peak train lengthening of up to 12 cars on certain routes may become highly desirable, though technically difficult. Another strategy could be to increase peak service level frequencies, though the RUS highlights the difficulties and even drawbacks of the interventions required to support that. Developments away from the existing heavy rail network are discussed such as:

- the extension of Crossrail beyond Abbey Wood to encompass the North Kent line
- the extension of the Bakerloo line into the south London suburbs
- various tram and/or Docklands Light Railway schemes

Certain key stations may require significant redevelopment, and a few new stations, including Brixton High Level, have been mooted and should be explored further at a later date.

== Subsequent developments ==
Eastfields station on the Wimbledon loop opened in June 2008.

In February 2008 an announcement of the approval and funding package for the East London London Phase 2 extension (from Surrey Quays to Clapham Junction) was made by Transport for London (TfL). However, the associated (as mitigation for the withdrawal of the South London Line service) Victoria-Bellingham service has not been confirmed. In early 2010 TfL is studying various alternatives to fill the gap.

The bay platforms at Blackfriars were closed in March 2009, pending reconstruction of the station.

In March 2009 Network Rail published its CP4 Delivery Plan 2009, including Enhancements programme: statement of scope, outputs and milestones, confirming most of the recommended interventions.

As at early May 2009 there are about 12tph through Blackfriars in the peak three hours.

In December 2010 completion of the Thameslink Programme was deferred to 2018.

In December 2011 platform lengthening was complemented on the Sydenham Line (to 10-car), the East Grinstead line (to 12-car) and the Bedford - Brighton route (to 12-car). The latter included the opening of a new station entrance at Blackfriars (South Bank) and a new station concourse at Farringdon.
