= Sussex Route Utilisation Strategy =

The Sussex Route Utilisation Strategy (Sussex RUS) is a Route Utilisation Strategy (RUS), published by Network Rail (NR) in January 2010. It was the fourteenth RUS to be completed, not counting the partially completed Network RUS. By default, RUSs are established by the Office of Rail Regulation (ORR) unless the latter objects within 60 days, and the ORR have confirmed no objection to the establishment of the Sussex RUS.

The scope of the Sussex RUS is largely the main line, with branches, connecting Brighton, Redhill, Croydon and central London, but also includes the so-called 'Coastway' lines. Most trains are operated by Southern, with the remainder run by First Capital Connect and First Great Western.

The recommendations are grouped into each strategic routes, and, as has become customary with RUSs, provide short-term (to end of Control Period 4, CP4, March 2014), medium-term (CP5, 2019) and some long-term (thereafter) solutions.

== Contingent projects ==
=== East London Line Extension ===
Inner suburban services through the London end of the geographical area will be affected by the completion of the East London Line Extension in May 2010. Though these services themselves were covered by the South London RUS, there will be some consequential effects on timetabling of services covered by the Sussex RUS.

=== Thameslink ===
This is the largest single programme affecting the RUS area, though in reality it comprises a significant number of related projects. The key objective is eventually to increase the frequency and length of the trains which pass between north and south London, and therefore has much wider scope than the Sussex RUS area. It includes very major works at Blackfriars and Farringdon, currently under way as at March 2010, and at London Bridge and its environs, after the 2012 Olympic Games. It will largely separate train services through London Bridge to/from Charing Cross-bound from those to/from Blackfriars. This programme will cause a number of sequential recasts of services affecting the Sussex RUS area.

The programme is divided into three stages:

- Key Output 0, complete
- Key Output 1, 2009–2011
- Key Output 2, 2012-2018

Train lengthening under the Thameslink Programme will affect a limited number of stations.

In general, the works will have the greatest impact on suburban routes rather than the longer-distance routes featuring in the Sussex RUS area.

== Gaps and options ==
The RUS summarises gaps in the following groups:

- Gap A - between passenger demand and capacity in the peaks into London
- Gap B - between passenger demand and capacity in the peaks on the West and East Coastway routes
- Gap C - between passenger demand and capacity on key regional links
- Gap D - between existing and desired journey times on key regional links
- Gap E - accessing the rail network
- Gap F - achieving performance targets on an increasingly busy railway
- Gap G - between passenger demand at the weekend and in the evening and services provided
- Gap H - between demand and capacity for freight services

Interventions to address these gaps are themselves divided into 16 options.

Unless otherwise stated the peak-hour trains comprise those arriving in London between 7 and 10am (high peak between 8 and 9) and leaving between 4 and 7pm (high peak between 5 and 6); the hours on either side of the high peak are known as the shoulder peak.

=== Gap A (peak demand and network capacity) and Options 1 through 3, with sub-options ===
Gap A concerns the danger of future overcrowding during the peak hours, and possible interventions to alleviate this problem on various routes (Redhill corridor, Tattenham Corner/Caterham routes, and Brighton Main line).

- Option 1 increased capacity in the peaks on the Redhill corridor; recommended:
  - 1.1 lengthening of high-peak trains by late CP4 or during CP5 (partly included in recent franchise)
  - 1.2 in CP5, one extra high-peak train
- Option 2 increased capacity in the peaks on the Tattenham Corner, Caterham and Uckfield routes; recommended for CP5:
  - 2.1 lengthening of high peak Tattenham Corner/caterham services to/from London termini (Victoria and London Bridge)
  - 2.2 lengthening of peak Uckfield services to/from London Bridge to 8-car
  - 2.3 lengthening of high-peak Uckfield services to/from London Bridge to 10-car
- Option 3 increased capacity in the peaks between Brighton Main line and Victoria; recommended:
  - 3.1 lengthening four shoulder peak services to 12-car (CP5)
  - 3.2 an additional morning peak hourly service, probably from Brighton (CP5)
  - 3.3 adding stops at Clapham Junction in at least two high-peak Gatwick Express services (CP4 or early CP5)

=== Gap B (between passenger demand and capacity in the peaks on the Coastway routes) and Option 4, with sub-options (no option 4.3) ===
Gap B concerns the danger of future overcrowding during the peak hours, and possible interventions to alleviate this problem to/from Brighton and Chicester

- Option 4 increased capacity in the peaks on the Coastway routes; recommended:
  - 4.1 lengthening of electric high peak Southern services that remain at 3-car to 4-car, on West Coastway
  - 4.2 lengthening of First Great Western 2-car evening diesel service departing Brighton (on West Coastway) to 4-car (lengthening 3-car morning service possible anyway)

Of the possible options for the East Coastway none was recommended, but the report notes that the Southern operating company was in process of consulting on an option to reduce crowding on the route. The result of the consultation was however not to progress the scheme.

=== Gap C (between passenger demand and capacity on key regional links) and Option 5, with sub-options ===
- Option 5 enhanced services between the North Downs line and Gatwick Airport
  - 5.1 lengthening to 4-car formation of selected services between the North Downs line and Gatwick Airport: one such service recommended
  - 5.2 extending more services from Redhill to Gatwick: can only be recommended if any extra unit is not required

=== Gap D (between passenger journey times on key regional links and aspirations thereto) and Option 6, with sub-options ===
- Option 6
  - 6.1 a fast service linking Southampton Central and/or Portsmouth Harbour to Chichester, Worthing and Brighton: not recommended owing to benefits not sufficiently exceeding net costs
  - 6.2 Ashford International and Hastings to Brighton: bypass Eastbourne via a new constructed Willingdon Chord, allowing speeded-up services: not recommended owing to net disbenefits to passengers and/or insufficient benefit/costs
    - some other local speeding up might be value for money (subject to development)
  - 6.3 avoiding splitting/joining at haywards Heath of services between London and both Coastway routes: no obvious path identified.

=== Gap E (improving access to the network) ===
There are already a number of schemes at stations in various stages of progress.

=== Gap F (performance) ===
A new platform (platform 0) at Redhill has been looked at; this would give performance benefits, but insufficient on their own to justify the development. However, the initiative is recommended in the broader context (e.g. journey time improvements plus facilitating train lengthening) for implementation in CP5, though very poorly explained in the document (no detailed benefit/cost analysis).

On the Arun valley route, resignalling is due to take place. Over and above like-for-like works, reducing the longest signalling headways between Billingshurst and Christ’s Hospital was appraised and found to be financially positive in respect of performance benefits alone, and hence recommended; it may also provide a small journey time improvement.

=== Gap G (handling demand during times of engineering access) ===
Seven-day railway initiatives are already underway in the area, and are not further considered in the RUS.

=== Gap H (freight capability on the Channel Tunnel route) ===
Strategic Freight Network initiatives are already underway in the area, particularly in respect of Class 92 electric locomotive operation, and are not further considered in the RUS.
