= Hakin Docks railway station =

Former railway station in Wales

Hakin Dock
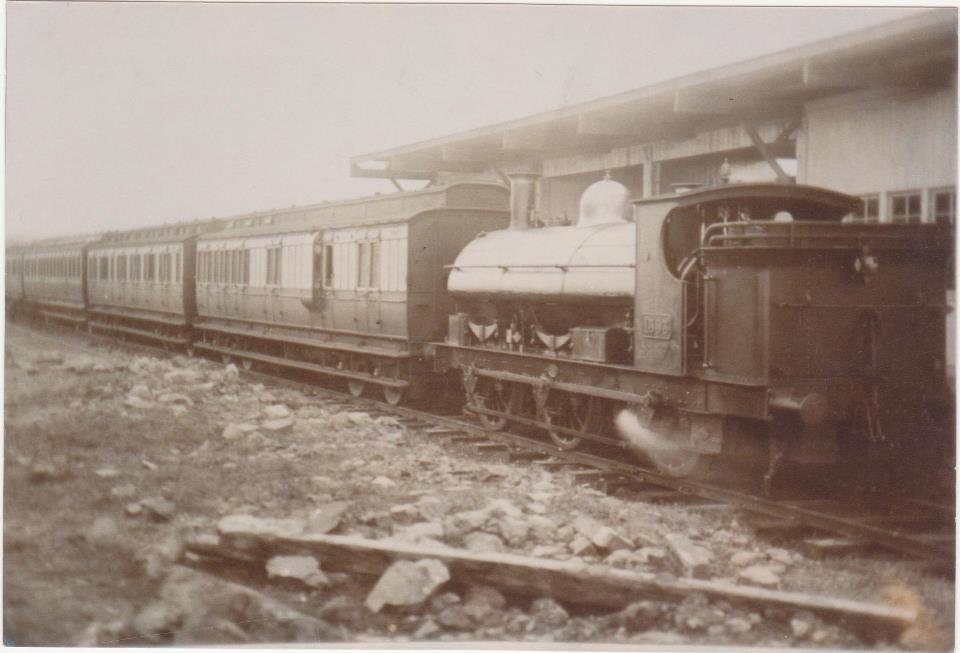
- Train waiting for passengers disembarking the City of Rome from New York,1889

General information
- Location: Hakin, Pembrokeshire; Wales
- Coordinates: 51.709341°N 5.038733°W
- Platforms: 1

Other information
- Status: Disused

History
- Original company: Milford Docks Company

Key dates
- 1 October 1889: Station opened
- ?: Station closed
Location

Hakin Dock railway station was a railway station in the town of Milford Haven in Pembrokeshire, Wales. Located within the commercial docks at Hakin, it was constructed to service an anticipated transatlantic trade between Milford Haven and New York City. It was the terminus of the Milford Junction Railway, itself a branch of the South Wales Railway. Opened in 1888, it was short lived and was no longer operating as a station for passengers by the early 20th century.

== History ==
The first links to a railway to Milford Haven came through the completion of the South Wales Railway in 1856. Isambard Kingdom Brunel had a vision of connecting London to New York City via a railway through Wales and then to a commuter port. The initial plan was to terminate the line at Fishguard and to create a ferry service to Ireland. The failure to complete Irish rail links meant that the terminus was modified to a location on the Milford Haven waterway. 1854 saw track reach Haverfordwest, at which point a decision had to be made as to the terminus.

New Milford at Neyland was selected, in spite of opposition from Greville, and was completed in April 1856. As a result, Greville determined to finance a project himself which would see the railway come to Milford Haven under the Milford Railway, a four-mile spur from Johnston. Construction began in August 1856 and lasted five years, finally completed in 1863, when the line was connected to the South Wales Railway at Johnston, and a station at Milford was opened.

Public services commenced 7 September 1863. Further track was laid towards the recently constructed docks complex in 1875. A spur to Newton Noyes, known as the 'Estate Line', was completed in 1882. It connected with a pier, which was reached via a lifting bridge at Castle Pill; the junction with the Milford line opposite the station. This development highlighted Milford station's less than favorable location, although equidistant between the two major populations of Milford and Hakin, it was at a distance from the quayside and with no discernible pedestrian access. To rectify the issue, the short-lived Hakin Dock Station was constructed in 1889.

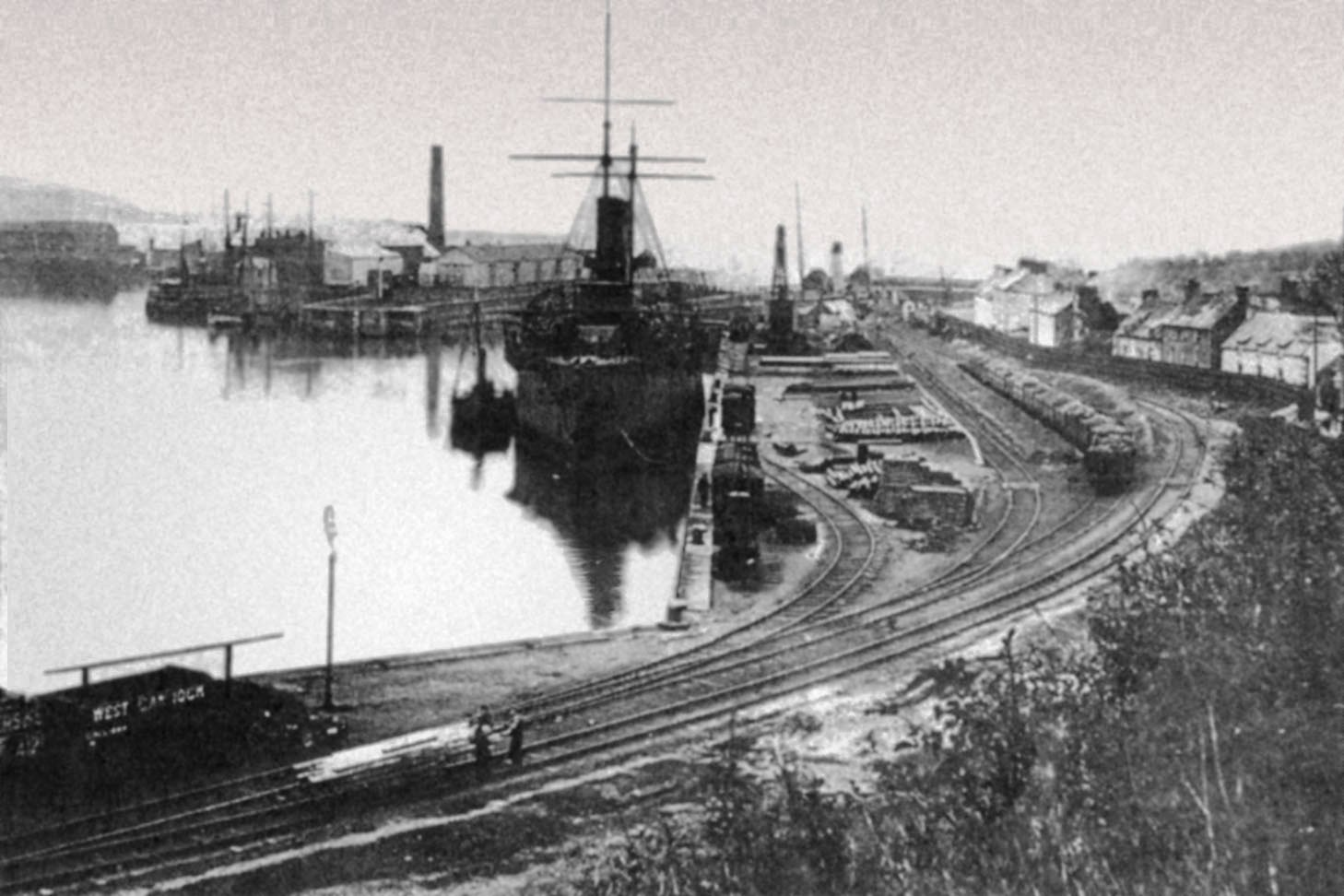
Rail tracks in Hakin in 1907, HMS Aurora berthed in the docks

Work was completed on the wooden structure in 1889, and it saw service as the alighting point for passengers embarking to North America, most notably the Gaspesia. It also welcomed passengers disembarking from New York, the inaugural voyage being the City of Rome in 1889. Its proximity to Milford Haven railway station, and the fact that transatlantic trade did not develop at the port, meant that the station was quickly dismantled and absorbed into the Milford Haven Docks complex. The track was later used for freight traffic servicing the fishing industry.

== Current status ==
All traces of the station have disappeared. The tracks remained until the late twentieth century, but were lifted by 1980.

Preceding station	Disused railways	Following station
Milford Haven; Line closed, station open	Great Western Railway; Milford Railway	Terminus; Line and station closed
