= North West Route Utilisation Strategy =

The North West Route Utilisation Strategy (NWRUS) is a Route Utilisation Strategy, published by Network Rail in May 2007. It was the fifth RUS to be produced. It was included in a map published by the Office of Rail Regulation as established in May 2007. It was the first of no fewer than 5 RUSs which cover specific routes in the north-west of England; The others are the Lancashire & Cumbria RUS (published August 2008), the Yorkshire & Humber RUS (published July 2009), the Merseyside RUS (published March 2009), and the West Coast Main Line RUS (now scheduled for publication in summer 2011). In particular it "broadly covers the Manchester journey to work area, the City lines into Liverpool Lime Street and routes from Manchester to Kirkby, Southport and Blackpool", corresponding to Network Rail's Route 20 - North West Urban.

As with other RUSs, the NWRUS took into account a number of responses, including the Office of Rail Regulation (ORR).

The RUS has identified 12 generic issues and relates these to the various rail 'corridors' in the region. As has become customary with RUSs, the recommendations are also nominally grouped into short-term (to end of CP4, March 2009), medium-term (CP5, 2014) and some long-term (thereafter) solutions; however, the individual initiatives are not as clearly located in time as other RUSs.

Some issues were passed to later RUSs: Lancashire & Cumbria; Merseyside; Yorkshire & Humber; West Coast Main Line.

A number of issues and provisional recommendations were viewed to be dependent on the December 2008 WCML timetable. The precise effect on these possible recommendations by the implementation of that timetable is difficult to ascertain.

== Stations and their codes ==
=== Central and interchange stations in the Manchester conurbation ===
There are four central Manchester stations (with their National Rail codes), all providing various levels of interchange: Manchester Piccadilly (MAN), Manchester Oxford Road (MCO), Deansgate (DGT) and Manchester Victoria (MCV); there are two Salford stations: Salford Central (SFD) and Salford Crescent (SLD), both significant interchange stations.

=== Other significant stations ===
Codes for some other stations in the region are as follows: Liverpool Lime Street - LIV; Stockport - SPT; New Mills Central - NMC; New Mills Newtown - NMN; Trafford Park - TRA; Hadfield - HDF; Glossop - GLO; Stalybridge - SYB; Preston - PRE; Blackburn - BBN; Blackpool North - BPN; Blackpool South - BPS; Squires Gate - SQU; Kirkham & Wesham - KKM; Atherton (Manchester) - ATN; Newton-le-Willows - NLW; Manchester Airport - MIA.

== The corridors ==
The corridors comprise two on the periphery of central Manchester, 12 'spokes' radiating from central Manchester, and one other from Liverpool. They are listed below with their general orientation and the corresponding central/interchange station(s) from which they emanate, where appropriate.

- The Castlefield corridor (DGT-MAN) This is the line from Castlefield junction (west of Deansgate) to Ardwick junction (east of Piccadilly). It is mainly two-track except at Oxford Road station, which has four through platforms and one bay. Recommendations are subsumed under those for the generic issues and the Stockport corridor.
- The Salford corridor (SLD-MCV) This comprises two short lines with several connections to the north-west of the central Manchester area. In the east they serve either Manchester Victoria station or (partly via the Windsor link) Ardwick junction; in the west they serve either the Salford Crescent or the Chat Moss corridor. Recommendations are subsumed under those for the generic issues.
- Stockport corridor (MAN) This is a little east of due south of Manchester, and the main route to the West Coast Main Line (WCML); it is also (via the line through Hazel Grove) the route to Buxton, and via the Hope Valley Line the main route to Sheffield.
- Marple corridor (MAN) This is more or less south-east of Manchester, and an alternative (stopping) route to Sheffield.
- Hadfield/Glossop corridor (MAN) This is more or less due east of Manchester; there are no onwards services.
- Stalybridge corridor (MAN, also MCV) This is a little north of due east of Manchester, and the main route to Leeds via Huddersfield.
- Oldham corridor (MCV) This is more or less north-east of Manchester, eventually connecting with the Calder Valley corridor at Rochdale.
- Calder Valley corridor (MCV) This is little east of due north of Manchester; it is the route to Rochdale and onwards to Hebden Bridge, the main route to Halifax and Bradford.
- Bolton corridor (MAN via MCO, DGT, SLD; MCV, via SFD, SLD) This is more or less north-west of Manchester, and the main route to Blackburn and Preston, also one route to Wigan.
- Atherton corridor (MCV) This is a little north of due west of Manchester, and another route to Wigan.
- Chat Moss corridor (MAN via MCO; MCV) This is a little south of due west of Manchester, and one route to Liverpool, via Eccles and Newton-le-Willows.
- CLC (part of historical Cheshire Lines Committee lines) corridor (MAN and MCO) This is a little further south of due west of Manchester, and the main route to Liverpool, via Warrington.
- Northwich corridor (MAN) This is more or less south-west of Manchester, via Sale and Altrincham.
- Styal corridor (MAN) This is a little west of due south of Manchester, and the route to Manchester Airport, also an alternative route to the WCML via Wilmslow.
- St Helens corridor This is a little north of due east of Liverpool, and the main link with the WCML northwards.

== Generic issues and sample recommendations ==
=== Inadequate capacity in the peaks ===
There is inadequate capacity in the peaks on most corridors, and this problem is likely to get worse in the face of forecast increasing demand. As with several other RUSs the chief solution recommended is to add cars to the trains, which in many cases will require platform extensions, or less commonly to provide additional services, which may require other infrastructural enhancements.

The broad strategy outlined is, in the short term, the redistribution of the present fleet, and in the medium term the provision of about 50 additional vehicles, which will require extra stabling. In the longer term a further approximately 50 cars may be necessary, depending on whether growth is at the higher levels of expectations.

=== Links between the major cities in the North West ===
The main link is between Liverpool and Manchester, which has fewer fast services than between Manchester and Leeds, though the traffic is greater. Also perceived to have inadequate services are the connections from both those cities to other major urban centres, e.g. Preston, Blackburn.

The RUS outlined the possibility of adding in the short term an additional fast service, making 4 such trains per hour (tph) in each direction between Manchester and Liverpool, with the proviso that all the services would need to use the same Manchester station. In the medium term, there are aspirations for higher linespeeds via Chat Moss.

Also mooted was the possibility of one extra (making 2tph) between Manchester and Preston.

=== Few corridors connect through Manchester ===
Some services continue through Manchester and provide direct connections to significant destinations. But most work into just one side of Manchester, with no direct connections to another side of Manchester. The largest single contribution to alleviating this problem is likely to be the relocation (or redevelopment) of Salford Crescent. Other, less substantial, interventions include reinstating a bay platform at Salford Central allowing Rochdale corridor trains to continue beyond Victoria.

=== Integration with Metrolink requires developing ===
In the short term it is proposed to improve signage and 'passenger environment' at Eccles to encourage interchange from the Chat Moss line to Metrolink; in the medium term this may lead to further Chat Moss services stopping at Eccles. In the long term an interchange between the CLC line and Metrolink in the Cornbrook or Pomona area may be developed, partly dependent on the results at Eccles.

=== Links to the region's airport are insufficient ===
The area has three airports: Manchester, Liverpool John Lennon and Blackpool. There is a perception that rail links need to be improved. A third platform at MIA was planned which would ease the problem of reactionary delays on relevant services. Improved interchange at Salford Crescent would improve accessibility to MIA to/from a number of locations. No recommendations with respect to the other two airports, other than better regional links generally, were accepted.

=== Freight traffic and growth is constrained by existing capacity/capability ===
The Freight RUS identified the Castlefield route as a capacity pinch point. The NWRUS identified a number of possible interventions, some of which would have impacts on other issues.

Access to Trafford Park container terminal is constrained, and may be alleviated by lengthening trains (in the short term) and infrastructure enhancements (in the medium term).

Simplification of handling of stone trains from Peak Forest, including remodelling at Buxton, is desirable, and clearing of the route through New Mills, Guide Bridge, Stockport or Victoria to RA10 capability by prioritising renewal of structures 2007 to 2014 was recommended; this would improve overall performance on the route.

=== Platforms at Salford Crescent and Manchester Piccadilly are congested at times ===
Salford Crescent comprises a simple island platform, but has in practice become a major actual and potential interchange point, as well a significant destination in its own right. It is highly desirable that the station be developed to handle the present and desired traffic; the currently-favoured option is to move the station northwards to a more spacious location, as minimal alterations to the layout would be required; if so the enhanced facilities would include 4 through platforms and two bay platforms.

=== Lack of facilities, including parking, at some stations ===
Guide Bridge and Newton-le-Willows are to be developed as 'park-and-ride' locations.

=== A significant number of stations see very light traffic ===
No fewer than 44 stations have below 50 regular passengers. However, none is scheduled for immediate closure, because of the cost and involvement of doing so. But increased traffic on other stations on these routes and other factors may make this unavoidable. In that case the full process for the closing of stations will have to be gone through.

=== Reactionary delays tending to perpetuate, lowering performance ===
This is particularly the case on the Castlefield corridor; however, the RUS states mainly that the effect of various interventions could not be assessed until the December 2008 WCML timetables were known.

=== A lot of rolling stock fits the current use poorly ===
This issue affect the following aspects:

- capacity - on some services the seating layout and density are not ideal for the traffic flow
- access/egress - door placement suitable for long-distance services may be sub-optimal when used in a commuting context
- speed - there is a trade-off, especially in older stock, between acceleration and top speed
- weight - there is a tendency for newer trains to be heavier but can be designed to mitigate this

As more new and refurbished rolling stock is designed and becomes available, solutions to these issues should be possible to provide a better fit of stock to services.

== Subsequent developments ==
Route 20 "A North West Feasibility Study to examine options to increase the capacity of the Manchester ‘Hub’ will be started in CP3. Assuming a business case can be proven, work to develop any significant recommended infrastructure schemes could commence in CP4, but with implementation in CP5."

The Olive Mount chord was implemented in December 2008.

The third platform at Manchester Airport was completed in December 2008.

The December 2008 timetable includes the following off-peak services from LIV to Manchester (and corresponding reverse-direction services):

- via Chat Moss, 1tph (semi-)fast to MCO and MAN, and onwards to MIA; 1tph stopping to MCV
- via the CLC, 2tph (semi-)fast to MCO and MAN, 2tph stopping to MCO.

The December 2008 timetable includes the following off-peak services from Preston to Manchester (and corresponding reverse-direction services):

- to MCO and MAN, 1 tph fast, 1tph semi-fast, and 1tph stopping
- to MCV 1tph stopping

=== NR CP4 Delivery Plan 2009 ===
In March 2009 Network Rail published its CP4 Delivery Plan 2009, including Enhancements programme: statement of scope, outputs and milestones, confirming several of the recommended interventions. Specific projects, with their reference and page numbers in the document, are given below:

- 24.00 Introduction to Northern urban centres - Manchester, p131
- 24.01 Platform lengthening, p132
- 24.02 Stabling for Northern Rail, p133
- 24.03 Salford Crescent station redevelopment, p134
- 24.04 Capacity enhancements, pp135–136 (possibly including Stalybridge track and signalling modifications, Buxton corridor enhancements, and modest line speed improvements between Ardwick and Guide Bridge)
- 25.00 Manchester - Chat Moss - Liverpool - Leeds linespeed improvements, p137
