= Kent Route Utilisation Strategy =

The Kent Route Utilisation Strategy (KRUS) is a Route Utilisation Strategy (RUS), published by Network Rail (NR) in January 2010. it was the thirteenth RUS to be completed, not counting the partially completed Network RUS. By default, RUSs are established by the Office of Rail Regulation (ORR) unless the latter objects within 60 days; and the ORR have confirmed no objection to the establishment of the Kent RUS.

Uniquely, this RUS area encompasses the only dedicated very high-speed railway in the United Kingdom, the so-called High Speed 1 (HS1), over which domestic, as opposed to the established international, services started a few weeks prior to publication of the RUS. Some of the RUS's conclusions do involve this line. However the scope of the RUS concentrates mainly on the 'classic' lines, most of which date to the 19th century; as such it includes the London Bridge to Hastings line, via Orpington, Sevenoaks and Tonbridge, almost all lines east of that line, plus the main line via Swanley into London Victoria. Most services, including those via HS1, are run via the Southeastern franchise.

Established plans will create significant changes in the classic network in the foreseeable future, especially those centred on the Thameslink Programme. The RUS identifies seven types of 'gap' and 16 groups of options to address these. In view of the prospective changes already in train, most initiative identified by the RUS are directed at Control Period 5 (CP5, April 2014-March 2019), though a few are detailed for Control Period 4 (CP4, to March 2014).

== Contingent projects ==
=== Thameslink ===
Thameslink is the largest single programme affecting the RUS area, though in reality it comprises a significant number of related projects. The key objective is eventually to increase the frequency and length of the trains which pass between north and south London, and therefore has much wider scope than the KRUS area. It includes very major works at Blackfriars and Farringdon, currently under way as at March 2010, and at London Bridge and its environs, after the 2012 Olympic Games. It will largely separate train services through London Bridge to/from Charing Cross-bound from those to/from Blackfriars. This programme will cause a number of sequential recasts of services affecting the KRUS area.

The programme is divided into three stages:

- Key Output 0, complete
- Key Output 1, 2009–2011
- Key Output 2, 2011/12-2016

The last stage will, following the Summer 2012 Olympic and Paralympic Games, encompass the wholesale redevelopment of London Bridge station and enhancement of its approaches at both ends. While the project will, upon completion, enhance capacity through London Bridge, during the works capacity will be restricted. At different stages during the work, a number of services to/from Charing Cross and Cannon Street stations will not be able to call at London Bridge. This will have implications widely throughout the KRUS area.

Train lengthening under the Thameslink programme will affect a limited number of stations.

New services from the KRUS area to north London via the Thameslink route may be possible at the conclusion of the programme, but would replace existing services in the KRUS area.

In general, the works will have the greatest impact on suburban routes rather than the longer-distance routes featuring in the KRUS area.

=== East Kent resignalling ===
This is scheduled to commence in 2011 with remodelling of the track layout in the Faversham, Margate and Ramsgate areas. Later the route through the Medway towns will be remodelled.

=== CP4 train lengthening ===
The anticipated train lengthening will affect mostly the suburban services, but will indirectly affect the main-line services.

== Gaps and options ==
The RUS summarises gaps in the following groups:

- Gap A - between passenger demand and capacity in the peaks
- Gap B - between passenger demand and capacity specifically within and close to Kent
- Gap C - accessing the rail network
- Gap D - between passenger demand in the evening/at weekends and services provided
- Gap E - between demand and capacity for freight services
- Gap F - achieving performance targets on an increasingly busy railway
- Gap G - between future services on the Hastings route and currently envisaged services.

Interventions to address these gaps are themselves divided into 16 options.

Unless otherwise stated the peak-hour trains comprise those arriving in London between 7 and 10am (high peak between 8 and 9) and leaving between 4 and 7pm (high peak between 5 and 6); the hours on either side of the high peak are known as the shoulder peak.

=== Gap A (peak demand and network capacity) and Options 1 through 6 ===
Gap A concerns the danger of future overcrowding during the peak hours, and possible interventions to alleviate this problem. This issue manifests itself differently on various routes (Tonbridge line, route via Bromley South, and others).

- Option 1 interventions attempting to allow additional services to run on the Tonbridge line; none recommended
- Option 2 lengthening of all high peak trains to 12 cars on the Tonbridge line; implied in existing plans
- Option 3 interventions attempting to allow additional services via Bromley South; one only (of three specific proposals) recommended
- Option 4 lengthening of all high peak trains via Bromley South; those consistent with platform lengths recommended for further progress or study
- Option 5 improved capacity in shoulder peaks; progressive lengthening recommended, but not extra services
- Option 6 added peak capacity on HS1; selective extension of services further back into Kent recommended

=== Gap B (aspiration for better off-peak services in/around Kent) and Options 7 through 9 ===
Gap B concerns the relatively poor connections within Kent and to adjacent non-London destinations.

- Option 7 increasing services per hour on several routes; none recommended (over those already committed) in the short or medium term
- Option 8 providing new services; none recommended, except the possibility of international services to France
- Option 9 reducing journey times by line speed increases and reviewing station calls: recommended for further study

=== Gap C (improving access to the network) and Options 10 and 11 ===
- Option 10
  - improving access to stations, via bus, car, bike and foot; all recommended
  - relocation of Rochester station; recommended for feasibility in conjunction with future scheduled resignalling
- Option 11 creating new stations; 4 (out of six) specific possibilities recommended for further consideration

=== Gap D (handling demand during times of engineering access) and Option 12 ===
- Option 12 progress seven-day railway initiatives; recommended in respect of Tonbridge and Chatham main Lines

=== Gap E (freight capability) and Options 13 and 14 ===
- Option 13 handle international freight demand; no recommendations beyond prospective use of HS1, and Redhill diversionary route
- Option 14 provide adequate freight capability for Thames Gateway; various initiatives to be pursued in the appropriate time scale

=== Gap F (performance) and Option 15 ===
- Option 15 reconcile increase in traffic with need to improve performance; anticipated schemes (East Kent resignalling and doubling Tanners Hill flydown) recommended, but not possible to recommend other infrastructure changes on performance grounds alone

=== Gap G (Hastings line service) and Option 16 ===
- Option 16 retain existing level of service to/from Hastings, after completion of Thameslink; the sole initiative recommended is to attach/detach fast and slow services to/from Charing Cross in the peak at Tunbridge Wells

== The longer term ==
The main recommendations of the KRUS cover the period to the 2020, just after the end of CP5. Further developments are envisaged later, but at this stage only very much in outline.

A continued increase in passenger numbers, especially at peak times and particularly on the Thames Gateway, Medway and Tonbridge routes are anticipated. After the CP4 and CP5 interventions, there will be very limited opportunities to expand capacity on the existing network.

Two possible major developments are identified:

- an extension of Crossrail to Gravesend, providing an alternative from north Kent to routes into existing London terminals
- the taking over of the Hayes branch by some other type of service; two possibilities are
  - integrating the line into the Docklands Light Railway network
  - the extension of the Bakerloo line to Lewisham, taking over the Hayes line from there
