= Milford Haven railway station =

Railway station in Pembrokeshire, Wales

Milford Haven Welsh: Aberdaugleddau
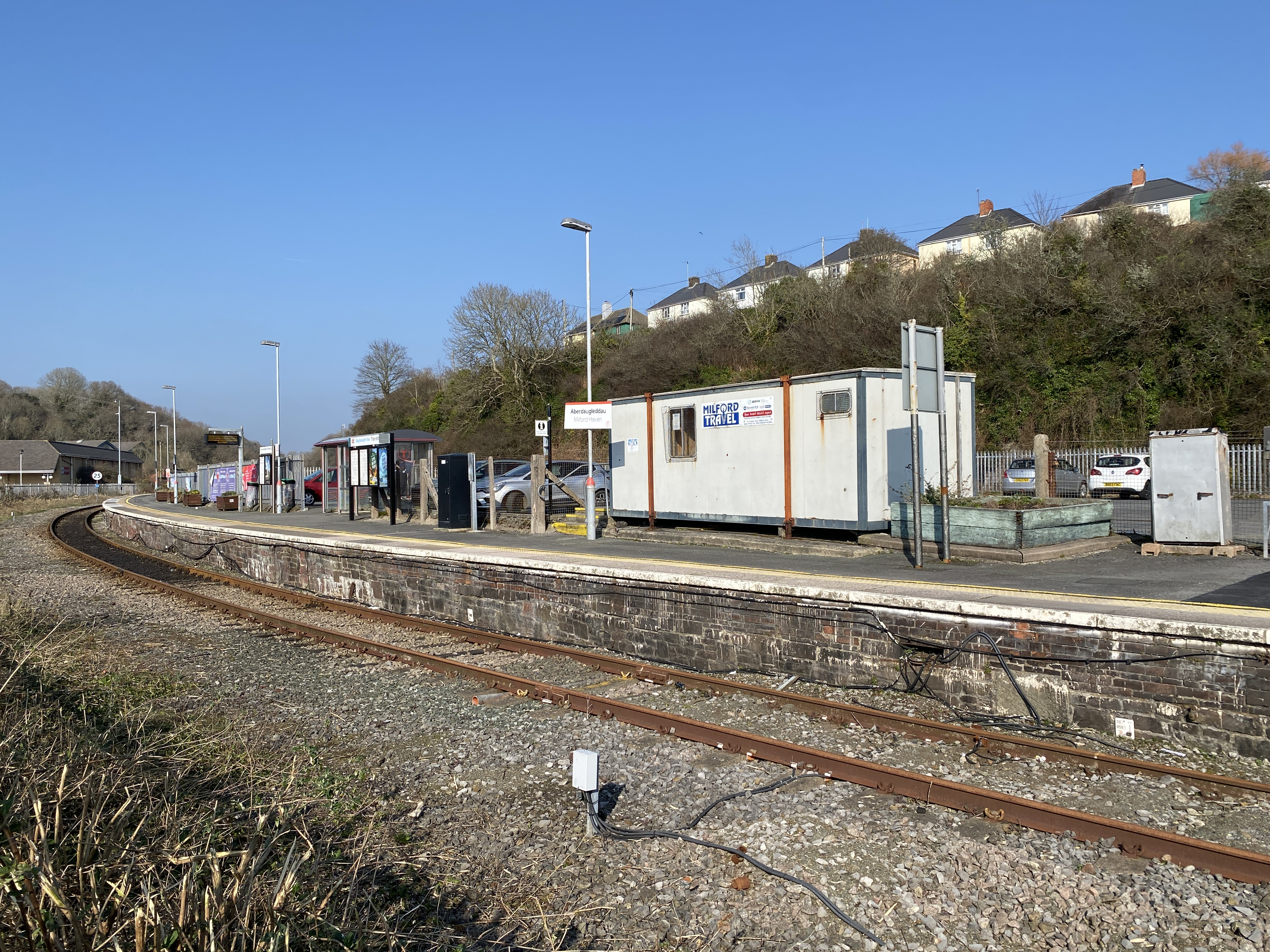

General information
- Location: Milford Haven, Pembrokeshire; Wales
- Coordinates: 51.715°N 5.041°W
- Grid reference: SM900062
- Manager: Transport for Wales
- Platforms: 1

Other information
- Station code: MFH
- Classification: DfT category F1

History
- Opened: 7 September 1863

Key dates
- 7 September 1863: Opened as Milford
- 1902: Renamed Old Milford
- 1910: Renamed Milford Haven

Passengers
- 2021/22: ▲37,336
- 2022/23: ▲46,158
- 2023/24: ▲51,332
- 2024/25: ▲55,930
- 2025/26: ▲58,720
Location
Notes
- Passenger statistics from the Office of Rail and Road

Milford Haven railway station serves the town of Milford Haven in Pembrokeshire, Wales. Opened on 7 September 1863, it was originally known as Milford, becoming Old Milford by January 1902, and finally being renamed Milford Haven by April 1910. It is the westernmost railway station in Wales, but not in Great Britain as some stations in England and Scotland are further west.

== History ==
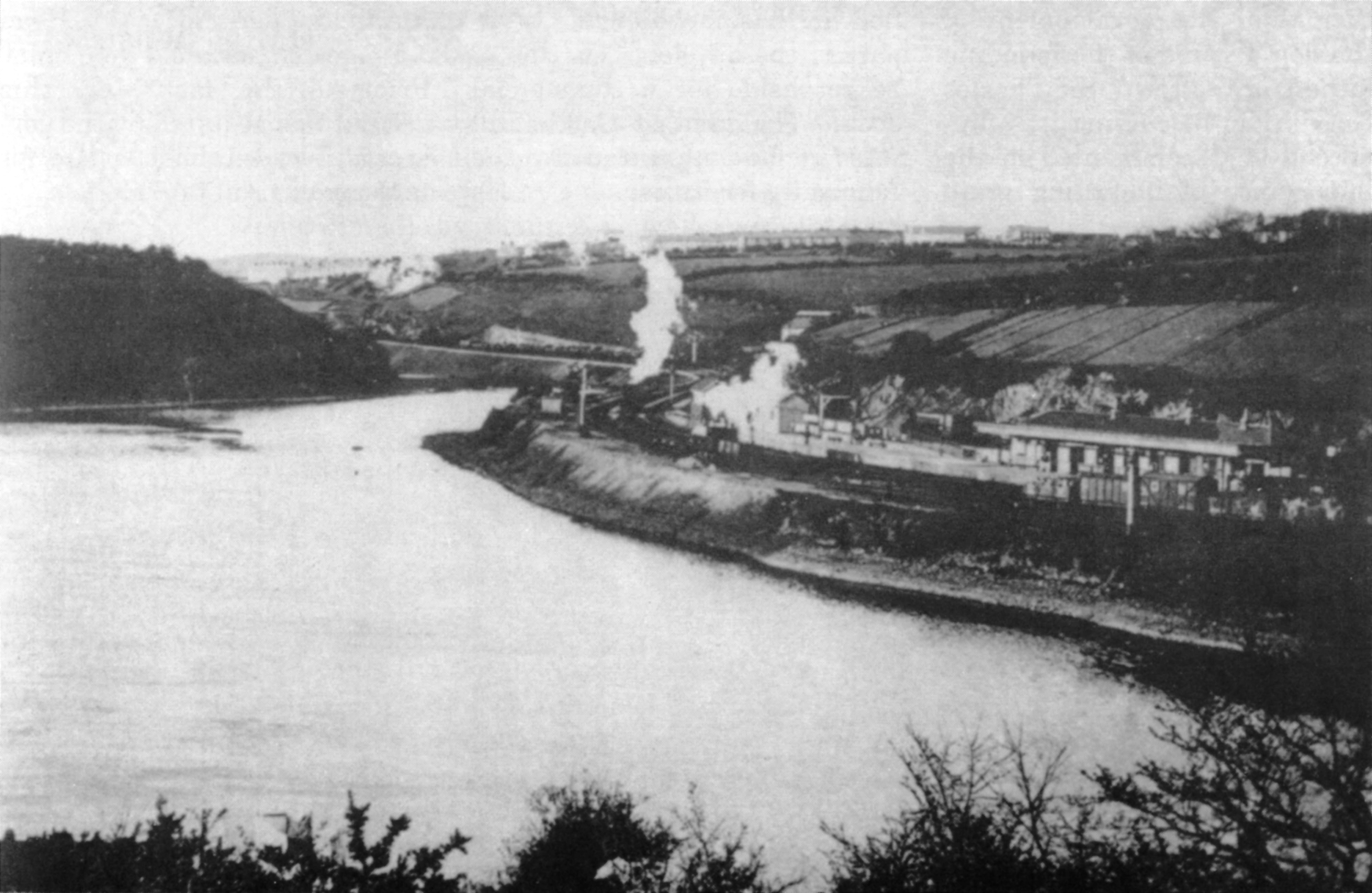
Hubberston Pill circa 1880, prior to its narrowing, Milford station visible in foreground

Milford Railway Act 1856
- Act of Parliament
- Parliament of the United Kingdom
- Long title: An Act for the incorporating of the Milford Railway Company and for the making of the Milford Railway in the County of Pembroke.
- Citation: 19 & 20 Vict. c. xiv

Dates
- Royal assent: 5 June 1856

Text of statute as originally enacted

The first links to a railway to Milford Haven came through the completion of the South Wales Railway in 1856. Isambard Kingdom Brunel had a vision of connecting London to New York City via a railway through Wales and then to a commuter port. The initial plan was to terminate the line at Fishguard and to create a ferry service to Ireland. The failure to complete Irish rail links meant that the terminus was modified to a location on the Milford Haven waterway. 1854 saw track reach Haverfordwest, at which point a decision had to be made as to the terminus. New Milford at Neyland was selected, in spite of opposition from Greville, and was completed in April 1856. As a result, Greville determined to finance a project himself which would see the railway come to Milford Haven under what was initially named the Milford Junction Railway, but ended up being authorised as the Milford Railway, a four-mile spur from Johnston authorised by the Milford Railway Act 1856 (19 & 20 Vict. c. xiv). Construction began in August 1856 and lasted five years, finally completed in 1863, when the line was connected to the South Wales Railway at Johnston, and a station at Milford was opened. The line was, and remains, single track, but sufficient room was allowed in cuttings and under bridges for doubling the track if required. The opportunity to provide a rival to the South Wales Railway by using Milford as a terminus to the Manchester and Milford Railway was also explored at this time.

A Railway commencing by a Junction with the Neyland Extension Railway of the South Wales Railway Company near the Third Bridge over the Neyland Extension Railway, on the Line towards Neyland, from the Johnston Station thereof, in the Parish of Johnston in the County of Pembroke, and terminating at or near to the Building Yard in the Occupation of Mrs. Roberts on the Shore of Priory Pill at Milford in the Parish of Steynton otherwise Stainton in that County, and which intended Railway will extend, or pass to, from, through, or into, or be made and maintained within the several Parishes, Townships, or Places of Johnston, Llandstadwell, Walwyn's Castle, Steynton otherwise Stainton, Hubberston, Harbrandstone otherwise Herbrandstonе, Rosemarket, and Milford, all in the County of Pembroke, or some or One of them. — Section 22, Milford Railway Act 1856 (19 & 20 Vict. c. xiv)

Excavation work was necessary to provide an embankment upon which the approaching track could be laid skirting the shoreline of Hubberston Pill. Public services commenced 7 September 1863. Further track was laid towards the recently constructed docks complex in 1875. A spur to Newton Noyes, known as the 'Estate Line', was completed in 1882. It connected with a pier, which was reached via a lifting bridge at Castle Pill; the junction with the Milford line opposite the station. This development highlighted Milford station's less than favorable location, although equidistant between the two major populations of Milford and Hakin, it was at a distance from the quayside and with no discernible pedestrian access. To rectify the issue, the short-lived Hakin Dock Station was constructed in 1898.

The original station was modest, with four sidings and a single platform, plus additional run around facilities sandwiched between the hillside and Hubberston Pill. Initial services comprised a local service running back and forth between Milford and Johnston, where passengers could connect with Great Western services from New Milford. By 1871, services had grown to seven daily in each direction, many connecting with passenger services from New Milford at Johnston. The trains using the line were operated by Great Western Railway who had part funded the original railway. It initially rented use of the line, although in 1896 absorbed the Milford Railway Company. In the 1930s many improvements were made, including narrowing the course of the Pill, extra side loops and goods yards. By 1923 the Milford Station Master was re-graded as a special class post, supported by twelve booking clerks and up to ten porters.

Up until 1947, three daily 'vacuum fish' express services transported fish from the Haven to various destinations in the UK, including London Paddington, Yeovil and the north of England. Fish vans were often attached to passenger trains. Goods traffic remained dominant over passenger traffic until the commercial decline of the docks in the late twentieth century. Into the twentieth century, direct services to London Paddington were in operation, and a sleeper service remained in place until the 1960s. The sidings were reduced substantially in 1968, although goods traffic continued until the 1980s. InterCity 125 services from London Paddington to Milford ran until the early 1990s, terminating in 1994. Sealink operated a service to Dún Laoghaire briefly between 1978 and 1979 from Milford. A scheme to expand the freight capability at Milford Haven is under development, based on a new import facility for biomass and wood pellets for the energy market in England and Wales. In September 2019, MP for Preseli Pembrokeshire Stephen Crabb called on politicians and Network Rail to upgrade Milford station, citing a lack of suitable facilities.

== Facilities ==
Waiting facilities include a covered shelter, as the original station building has been demolished. A free carpark is located opposite the platform, with capacity for 15 vehicles. An independent ticket office operates from a site on the station. The station is staffed on a part-time basis. Train running details are offered via timetable posters, a customer help point and digital information screens. Step-free access is available from the main entrance and car park to the platform.

A commemorative stone and plaque was unveiled in September 2013 on the site of the former station building to mark the 150th anniversary.

== Services ==
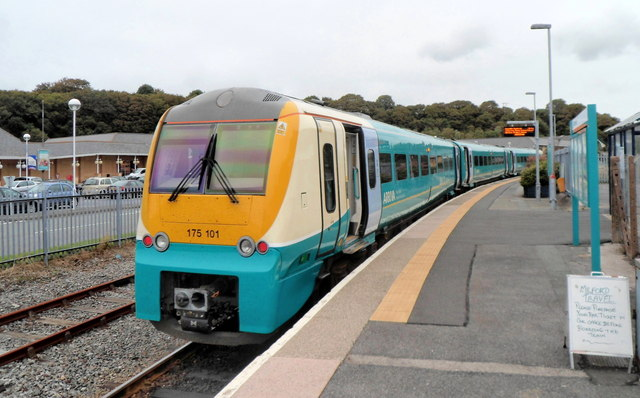
An Arriva Trains Wales service waiting to depart for Cardiff Central

The station, and all trains serving it, are operated by Transport for Wales. The usual service pattern is one train every two hours to Manchester Piccadilly via Carmarthen, Swansea, Bridgend, Cardiff Central, Hereford, Shrewsbury, Crewe and Stockport. Certain non-peak hour services terminate in Carmarthen.

In 2008, the Wales Route Utilisation Strategy identified the requirement for an hourly frequency on the core route into west Wales between Swansea and Milford Haven.

Preceding station	National Rail	Following station
Johnston	Transport for Wales; West Wales line	Terminus
	Disused railways	
Johnston; Line and station open	Great Western Railway; Milford Railway	Hakin Docks; Line and station closed
Johnston; Line and station open	Great Western Railway; Milford Railway	Newton Noyes; Line and station closed

=== Historical ===
Until July 1994, British Rail ran a daily train from London Paddington through to Milford Haven via Reading, Bristol Parkway, Cardiff Central, Swansea, Whitland and Haverfordwest, usually operated by an InterCity 125. Under the Wales & West franchise services were also more widespread than today. A daily service operated between Milford and London Waterloo via Whitland, Swansea, Cardiff Central, Bristol Temple Meads, Bath Spa, Bradford-on-Avon, Basingstoke and Clapham Junction. Services also ran regularly to Liverpool Lime Street, and several trains per week ran to Plymouth and Penzance via Swansea, Cardiff Central, Bristol Temple Meads, Taunton, Exeter St Davids, Plymouth, Truro and St Erth. Before September 2002 it was also not uncommon to see Virgin CrossCountry trains operating from Milford Haven to stations in the north and Scotland, usually Edinburgh and Glasgow via Swansea, Cardiff Central, Bristol Parkway, Cheltenham Spa, Birmingham New Street, Leeds, York, Newcastle and Edinburgh, Glasgow bound trains continued via Haymarket and Motherwell. Occasionally services ran from Milford Haven as far north as Aberdeen on the same route as the Edinburgh bound train, then continuing via Haymarket, Inverkeithing, Perth, Dundee, Arbroath and Montrose. These services were usually operated by an InterCity 125 set.
