= Scotland Route Utilisation Strategy =

Network Rail planning report

The Scotland Route Utilisation Strategy is a Route Utilisation Strategy, published by Network Rail in March 2007, the third RUS to be published. The railways in Scotland are divided into three strategic routes, namely Route 24 (East of Scotland), Route 25 (Highlands) and Route 26 (Strathclyde and South West Scotland) together with parts of Route 8 (East Coast Main Line, ECML) and Route 18 (West Coast Main Line, WCML). The three strategic routes form the scope of Network Rail's Scotland Route Utilisation Strategy. Separate RUSs for the ECML (published February 2008) and WCML (scheduled for publication late in 2009) encompass the relevant parts of routes 8 and 18. The Edinburgh Crossrail service, which provides a direct route between Stirling, Dunblane and Bathgate in the west to Newcraighall in the east, operates over part of the ECML east of Edinburgh Waverley to Portobello Junction.

The recommendations are grouped into each strategic route, and, as has become customary with RUSs, provide short-term (to end of CP3, March 2009), medium-term (CP4, 2014) and some long-term (thereafter) solutions. Essentially there are few major recommendations for the lightly used Route 25, but there are various and diverse recommendation for the other two, heavily used, routes. There are urgent issues to do with overcrowding in the peaks and with the capacity of individual lines and station, especially in the light of significant predicted growth in traffic (passenger and also freight).

Scotland, with its devolved government and Parliament responsible for transport in the nation, has been very active in pursuing the possible development of the rail infrastructure. At the time of the study and its publication there were a number of contingent projects at various stages, but mostly with capital funding already identified. These include:

- remodelling the western approach to Edinburgh Waverley station, and new platforms (subsequently completed February 2008)
- reopening the Stirling-Alloa-Kincardine line (subsequently completed May 2008)
- Stirling remodelling
- reopening the Airdrie–Bathgate rail link through route, including reinstating the Drumgelloch to Bathgate section
- a new Glasgow Airport Rail Link (GARL) branching off an enhanced line through Paisley
- the Borders Railway, a plan to reopen extensive sections of track south-east of Edinburgh
- the Edinburgh Airport link, a short new section of track branching off the Edinburgh to Glasgow line, with other connections

== Specific measures recommended ==
=== Route 24 - East of Scotland ===
==== Short term ====
- lengthening of some trains in the Stirling-Glasgow corridor to 6-car, with appropriate platform extensions
- partial remodelling and resignalling in the Stirling-Larbert corridor, partially consequent on the reopening to Alloa/Kincardine
- timetabling recast between Edinburgh and Aberdeen via Fife to deliver faster trains and services more responsive to demand
- a new fuelling and cleaning depot, probably at Perth
- initiatives compatible with future tram/train interchange at Edinburgh Haymarket station
- changes to the Edinburgh Crossrail service pattern (subsequently implemented)
- improvement of car parking provision in Central Scotland stations.

==== Medium term ====
- significant further redevelopment at Haymarket station
- further work on revamping of services on the Cowlairs junction-Glasgow Queen Street route, possibly including light rail technology
- signalling revamping to produce greater capacity between Haymarket and Inverkeithing, and over the Tay bridge
- between Aberdeen and Dundee an additional southbound freight loop at Laurencekirk
- remodelling of Portobello junction, east of Waverley station, between the ECML and the future Waverley Rail Link
- introduction of improved sustainable intermodal interchange at various places, but including provision for car parking.

==== Long term ====
- there are aspirations for increased capacity and speed of service between Glasgow and Edinburgh; various possibilities need to be researched, including wholesale redevelopment of Glasgow Queen Street station

=== Route 25 - Highlands ===
==== Short term ====
- some timetabling options.

==== Medium term ====
- additional infrastructure to speed up and improve services Inverness-Perth and Inverness-Aberdeen
- lengthening of some trains to 6-car between Inverness and Aberdeen, with appropriate platform extensions.

==== Long term ====
- further acceleration and increased capacity using enhanced rolling stock and (radio) signalling

=== Route 26 - Glasgow and South West Scotland ===
==== Short term ====
- lengthening of peak trains to 6-car and service frequency improvement on the route between Glasgow and Kilmarnock, with appropriate platform extensions and other infrastructure.
- on the basis of the assumed closure of Stranraer as a ferry port, a better local service in the Stranraer area (the ferry service still operates as of March, 2009)
- timetabling for a more even service with less overcrowding
- redoubling between Annan and Gretna and enhanced signalling to meet potential freight growth
- independent electrical feeder supply to Polmadie depot.

==== Medium term ====
- work on revamping of services into Glasgow Central High Level, possibly including electrification of the Whifflet line and diversion of these services via Central Low Level
- once the reopened Aidrie-Bathgate route is in place, there will be three routes available between Edinburgh and Glasgow
- the enhancements and additional track that is part and parcel of GARL will provide extra capacity between Glasgow Central and Paisley Gilmour Street
- possible platform extensions on the Ayrshire and Inverclyde corridors would support trains longer than 6 cars
- increased capacity on the freight route between Mauchline and Ayr (Falkland) when signalling is replaced
- remodelling of Hyndland junction west of Partick to increase throughput at a pinch point
- improved engineering access from 2009 Law junction to Carstairs, south-east of Glasgow

==== Long term ====
- developments at Glasgow Central in the long term to provide additional capacity
- possible implementation of a semi-fast and stopping service on the East Kilbride line
- given growth in freight and passenger traffic, provision of further additional capacity between Glasgow and Ayrshire
- a third (bi-directional) track between Eglinton Street Jn and Muirhouse Jn to provide required capacity by the end of the RUS period

== Subsequent developments ==
The line between Stirling and Kincardine has reopened; an hourly passenger service operates between Stirling and Alloa only, and freight runs over the whole route.

The current remodelling of Edinburgh Waverley station is complete; further improvement in pedestrian access is planned.

Revamped, electrified line, double-tracked throughout, between Airdrie and Bathgate, including reopening the Drumgelloch to Bathgate route, is to be completed by late 2010.

The Edinburgh Airport Rail Link has been suspended and mothballed, in favour of a tramlink interchange and extension.

National Express East Coast have taken over the ECML franchise.
