= Lancashire and Cumbria Route Utilisation Strategy =

The Lancashire and Cumbria Route Utilisation Strategy is a Route Utilisation Strategy, published by Network Rail on 29 August 2008 It was the ninth RUS to be produced.

By default, RUSs are established by the Office of Rail Regulation (ORR) unless the latter objects within 60 days. The L&C RUS was established on 28 October 2008.

The L&C RUS was the second of no fewer than 5 RUSs which cover specific routes in the north-west of England; the others are the North West RUS (NWRUS, published May 2007), the Yorkshire & Humberside (published July 2009), the Merseyside RUS (published March 2009), and the West Coast main Line RUS (scheduled for publication in the second half of 2009). Officially the RUS area corresponds exactly to Network Rail's Route 23 - North West Rural, but in practice includes both routes to Blackpool from Preston, part of Route 20.

As with other RUSs, the L&C RUS took into account a number of responses, including the Office of Rail Regulation (ORR) .

As has become customary with RUSs, the recommendations are nominally grouped into Control Periods (CP): CP4 - to the end of March 2009, CP5 - to 2014, and the longer term (CP6 and beyond). The great majority of recommendations are focussed on CP4.

The RUS received the following issues from the North West RUS (NWRUS):

- improving the link between Preston – Ormskirk so that the service between Liverpool and Preston can be enhanced
- extending local Manchester services to Accrington and Burnley
- enabling services to run between Southport and Preston.

Some issues were passed to later RUSs: Merseyside; Yorkshire & Humber; West Coast Main Line.

== The situation at the time of the RUS ==
The great majority of the route mileage has permitted line speeds between 55 and 60 miles per hour (mph), with shorter sections of both higher and lower speeds. Junctions are no faster than 30 mph, with significant numbers rated at lower speeds, down to 10 mph in some cases.

The only W9/W10 freight route is the Heysham to West Coast Main Line via Morecambe route; most of the network is restricted to W6 or W7. The Settle and Carlisle route carries a considerable amount of coal traffic.

The region carries about 10.2 million passengers per year, divided as follows:

- between stations in the RUS area: 29%
- between the RUS area and the rest of the North West: 40%
- between the RUS area and other regions: 31%.

Unlike most RUSs, capacity for the number of passengers wishing to travel is a problem only in very localised places. Crowding occurs in peak-time commuter routes into Manchester, but that was already addressed in the NWRUS. There is a particular issue on the Cumbrian Coast Line at Sellafield and occasionally at Carlisle. Sporadic crowding occurs on the Carlisle-Leeds and Morecambe-Leeds routes.

Generally much more of an issue are the relatively poor state of regional links. The following potential route links are characterised as 'missing':

- Southport-Preston
- Accrington-Manchester
- Burnley-Manchester
- Burnley-Bradford (and Leeds).

The following links are characterised as 'weak':

- Barrow-West Cumbria, 7 trains daily and long journey times
- Carlisle-Bradford (and Leeds), 6 trains daily and long journey times
- Lancaster-Bradford (and Leeds), 4 trains daily.

== Generic gaps ==
Certain generic gaps are identified:

1. links between centres and to outside main destinations are relatively poor
2. the service level is not generally attractive to commuters
3. the potential alleviation of social derivation
4. the infrequent services are not generally attractive for tourism
5. network capability restrains better and more attractive services
6. on several route performance is poor
7. interchange facilities are not adequate

== Specific interventions recommended in CP4 ==
In the detail below the generic gaps addressed (as above) are included in brackets.

=== Cumbrian Coast ===
- Barrow-Sellafield: lengthen the two existing peak trains in both peaks (2)
- Whitehaven-Sellafield: extra peak train in both peaks (2)
- Carlisle-Barrow: improve frequency, to hourly if possible, using extra units required for peak service (1,2,3)
- Barrow-Lancaster: provide an hourly service at main stations served (1,2,3)
- Carlise-Whitehaven: one additional Sunday service (1,3,4)
- Minor infrastructure enhancements within scheduled renewals (1,2,6)

=== Settle and Carlisle ===
- Two-hourly Carlisle-Leeds service, with improved connections (2,4)
- Redouble track between Carlisle South Junction and London Road Junction (5,6)
- Optimise maintenance and renewals (1,2,4,5)

=== Roses line ===
- Extended peak Manchester Victoria-Blackburn services to Clitheroe (1,2,3)
- Line speed improvements
  - east of Burnley Manchester Road (1,5,6)
  - Blackburn-Clitheroe (1,5,6)
  - Colne branch (5,6)

=== Preston-Ormskirk ===
- Preston-Ormskirk: hourly service, speeded up using moderate infrastructure improvements (1,2)

=== Morecambe-Leeds ===
- Cut back to Skipton at east end and possibly Lancaster at west end to provide roughly 90-minute interval service (1,2,4)

=== Other improvements ===
Station interchange

- Preston
- carlisle
- Ormskirk
- Blackburn
- Burscough Junction

Train lengthening
Services to Clitheroe may be strengthened by train lengthening (subject to funding) and extending the peak service between Manchester and Blackburn.

== Interventions previewed for CP5 ==
- Cumbrian Coast Line: some infrastructure improvements during renewals (1,2,5,6)
- Southport-Ormskirk: hourly service via reinstated Burcough South curve, with good connection to Preston (1,2)

== Subsequent developments ==
The December 2008 timetable increased the level of service between Sellafield and Whitehaven to ten a day (from five).
