= Route Utilisation Strategy =

Report by Network Rail; long-term plan

Network Rail (NR) has an obligation, transferred from the abolished Strategic Rail Authority, to periodically produce Route Utilisation Strategy (RUS) documents. The original programme was approved by the Office of Rail Regulation (ORR) in June 2006; under an early version of the programme all but two RUSs were scheduled to be completed by the end of Control Period 3 (CP3), 31 March 2009. The programme and its timescale were reviewed by NR and ORR at regular intervals. Despite this the delivery timescales continually slipped: at the end of CP3 no fewer than 9 (almost half) remained incomplete (still in progress or not yet established), despite the fact that funding for infrastructure developments in CP4 was largely set.

One RUS, the Network RUS, was broken into four workstreams, with a fifth added, apparently, in 2011.

The original programme was completed by September 2011.

Late in 2009, NR announced a second generation of RUSs. These were completed by July 2011.

Effectively the RUS process has been replaced by the Long Term Planning Process, which consists of:

- Market studies (regional)
- Route studies (regional)
- Cross boundary analyses

== Approach and outputs ==
All but two RUSs are geographical, mainly regional, in nature. The exceptions are the Freight RUS and the Network RUS, which have the perspective of the network as a whole. The non-regional geographical studies include the East Coast Main Line RUS and West Coast Main Line RUS, which penetrate Scotland, and regions which have their own RUS. All RUSs consider the demands of freight transport, but the Freight RUS looks at the implications of major freight flows for Great Britain as a whole. The Network RUS is divided into four largely self-contained workstreams: long-distance traffic and generic cross-RUS issues; stations; rolling stock and depots; and electrification.

The first stage of each strategy is the preparation and publishing of a scoping document, which is usually produced after a few months. The main part of the study takes place over a period of a year or two, and this concludes with the production and distribution of a draft strategy document. About 12 weeks are allowed for consultation and responses from the rail industry and other entities, following which the final strategy is developed and a final version is published. This is later established by the ORR, unless they have reason to object to the final version.

The scoping document is usually fairly short, sometimes in the form of a presentation.

The strategy document itself normally consists of a fairly standard number of sections: an introduction and explanation of context; a fairly detailed presentation of current services; a forecast of future changes (overwhelmingly increases) in demand; gaps in resources; options for satisfying the demand; the recommended strategy. Other sections may be included, including a section on the consultation process itself specifically in the draft strategy.

The strategies developed so far are related to the Network Rail Control Periods (CP). Up to the publication of the Wales RUS (November 2008), the 'short-term' strategy included those initiatives to the end of CP3; as this finished on 31 March 2009, the short-term activities mentioned in these strategies were mostly underway, at least in the planning process. In general, strategies have an approximate 10-year timescale, taking them into a "long term" corresponding with CP5 (ending in 2019). Strategies from 2009 present specific initiatives towards the end of that period, and sometimes into the next; CP4 (ending in 2014) is the new short-term perspective.

Network Rail has an obligation to maintain RUSs, even after establishment. This would be the case in one or more of the following situations: when there has been a change in circumstances; if ordered to by the ORR; when (for whatever reason) it is clear the recommendations are probably no longer valid. The RUS is revisited using the same methodology. However, in only one case, the East Coast Main Line, has an original RUS been supplemented by a further study. Nevertheless, a further generation of three RUSs are underway, two of them covering a much broader geographical area than the originals, together with an extended timescale.

== Individual strategies ==
These are listed in order of publication; they are all established:

- South West Main Line RUS (March 2006)
- Cross London RUS (August 2006)
- Scotland RUS (March 2007)
- Freight RUS (March 2007)
- North West RUS (May 2007)
- Greater Anglia RUS (December 2007)
- East Coast Main Line RUS (February 2008)
  - supplemented by the East Coast Main Line 2016 Capacity Review (December 2010)
- South London RUS (March 2008)
- Lancashire and Cumbria RUS (August 2008)
- Wales RUS (25 November 2008)
- Merseyside RUS (27 March 2009)
- Network RUS
  - Long distance workstream (9 June 2009)
  - Electrification workstream (28 October 2009)
  - Stations (31 August 2011)
  - Rolling stock and depots (1 September 2011)
- Yorkshire and Humber RUS (15 July 2009)
- Kent RUS (22 January 2010)
- Sussex RUS (29 January 2010)
- East Midlands RUS (25 February 2010)
- Great Western RUS (26 February 2010)
- West Midlands & Chilterns RUS (27 May 2011)
- West Coast Main Line RUS (7 July 2011)

== Second generation RUSs ==
The announced RUSs and dates of their publications (all established) are as follows:

- Northern RUS (May 2011)
- Scotland RUS (June 2011)
- London and the South East RUS (28 July 2011)
