= Hakin =

Village in Pembrokeshire, Wales

Coordinates: 51.712273°N 5.047338°W

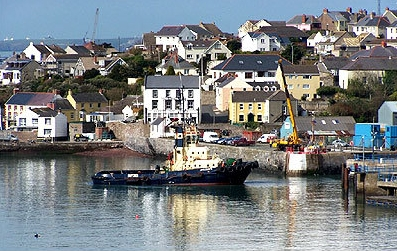
- View of Hakin Point from Milford Docks

- Location within Pembrokeshire
- Population: 2,313
- OS grid reference: SM899061
- Principal area: Pembrokeshire
- Country: Wales
- Sovereign state: United Kingdom
- Post town: MILFORD HAVEN
- Postcode district: SA73
- Dialling code: 01646
- Police: Dyfed-Powys
- Fire: Mid and West Wales
- Ambulance: Welsh

Hakin is a coastal village in Pembrokeshire, Wales. It belongs to the parish of Hubberston in the historical hundred of Roose. It is located directly to the west of the larger town of Milford Haven, and is a district of the community of Milford Haven It had a population of 2,313 inhabitants in 2001.

== Etymology ==
The name Hakin is derived from the Old English Hecke, meaning "corner in the bend of the stream", and the German Ecken, meaning "a point of land". The word was used as a geographical term to describe the location of an area, as late as 1794. The term Haking to describe the current boundary was first recorded in 1861, in the British Postal Guide, provided as a sub-office under Milford. Prior to this, the area had been referred to as Hubberston, or Hubberston-Haking.

== History ==
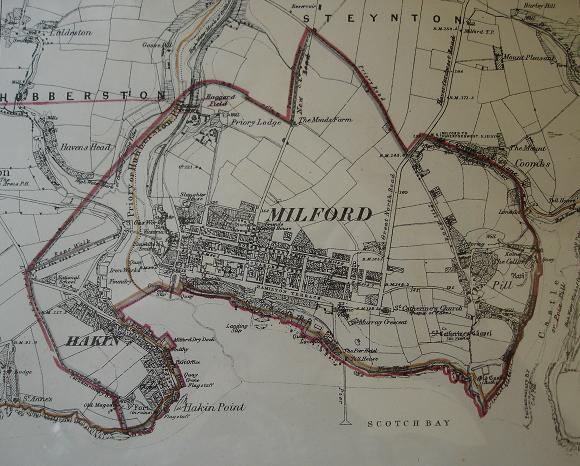
Hakin, 1868

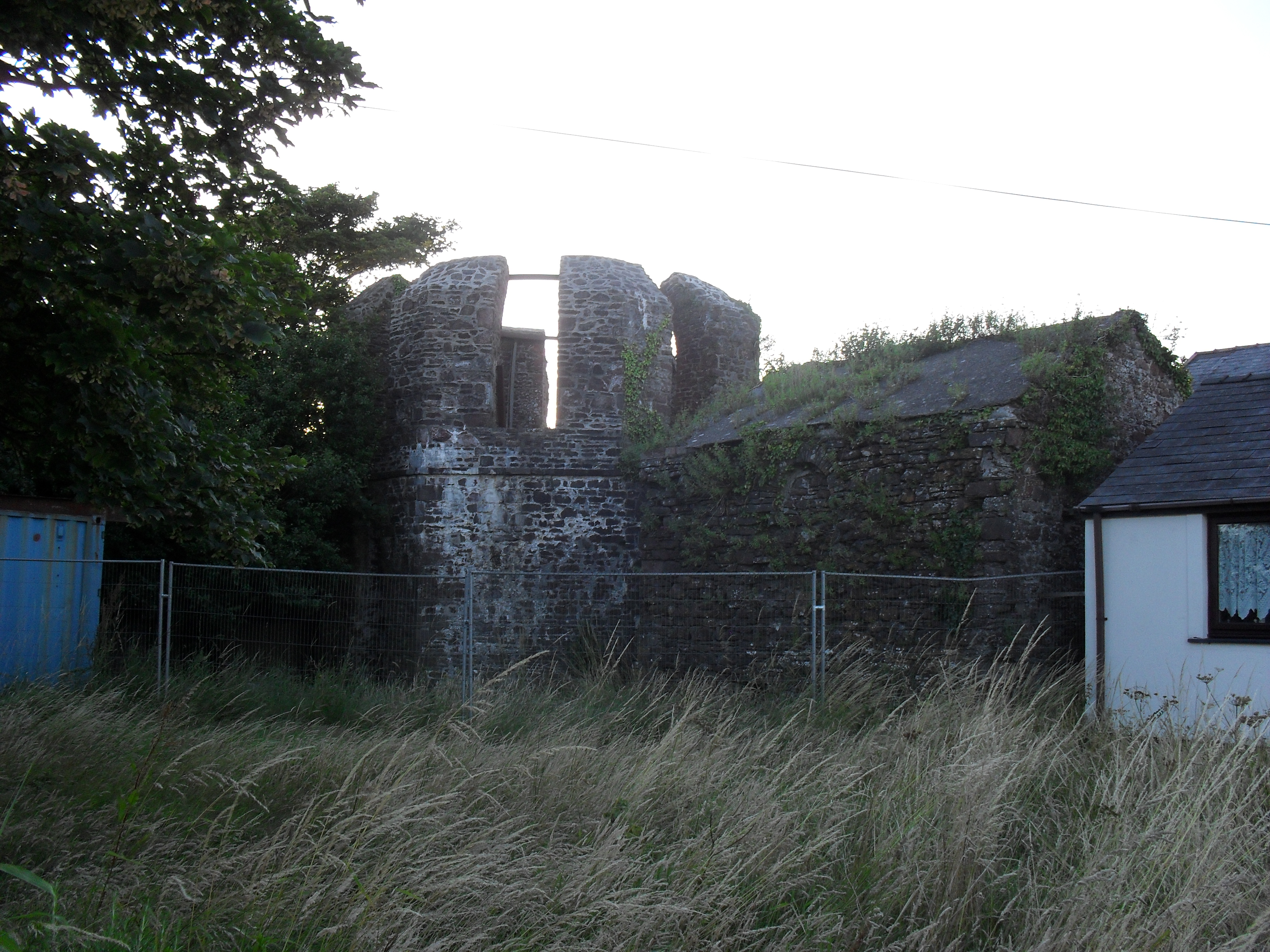
The Observatory

Hakin has been a settlement since at least the 13th century. It has variously been known as Haking, and later as Old Milford, to distinguish it from the newer settlement across the tidal estuary. A ferry service to Ireland operated from Hakin towards the end of the 18th century, although this ceased in the early 19th century. Between 1801 and 1803, the village and waterway were protected by temporary batteries at Hakin Point, in response to the perceived threat following the Fishguard Invasion.

At a site on high ground in Hakin, Charles Francis Greville planned to build The College of King George the Third to study mathematics and navigation, whose centrepiece would be an observatory. Although the observatory was built, and scientific instruments delivered, the college never functioned as such as after the death of Greville in 1809 the whole project was abandoned. The remains of the observatory still stand and are grade II* listed.

By 1849, the district of Hakin was described as a considerable centre of boat building, with approximately 200 "shipwrights residing at that place". However until the construction of a bridge linking the populations of Hakin and Milford, access to the district was via a plank across Hubberston Pill, and Hakin was considered something of a poor relation to the main town. Point Street, formerly Store Street, was the busy hub of the community, characterized by numerous public houses, stores to service the maritime trade, and prostitution. The completion of the Milford Docks in 1888 radically altered the Hakin landscape.

Whereas Hubberston grew up around St David's church and Hubberston Green, Hakin evolved around Hakin Point and Point Street. With the construction of council housing in the interwar period, the division between the two districts became less clear. An initial building phase included prefabs in Nelson Avenue, Harbour Way and Observatory Avenue, although these were later replaced with more substantial properties.

== Transport ==
Hakin is separated from Milford Haven by Hubberston Pill, a once tidal estuary. Access is via Victoria Bridge, which is reached via the A4076 through Milford Haven. A circular bus service operates, providing connections to Milford Haven. The village is served by the nearby Milford Haven railway station. Hakin Dock railway station operated briefly from a location on the docks.

== Education ==
There are several primary schools in the village:

Gelliswick school The MITEC School of Boatbuilding & Marine Engineering, a branch of Pembrokeshire College, offers courses in boatbuilding and marine engineering. It is located in Milford Docks.

== Governance ==
The Milford Hakin electoral ward elects a councillor to Pembrokeshire County Council. Prior to 1996 the ward for elections to Dyfed County Council was simply called Hakin.

== Religion ==
Hakin identifies itself as almost exclusively Christian. Places of worship within the village include:

Anglican

- St David's Hubberston
- St Mary's, Hakin
- Church of the Holy Spirit, Hakin *Calvinistic Methodist Chapel, Hakin
- Rehoboth Calvinistic Methodist Chapel, Hakin

Roman Catholic

- St Claires, Hakin (Closed and Demolished 2000)

United Reformed Church

- Hakin Point

== Sport and leisure ==
The village has a number of venues for sports and leisure. There are local rugby and football clubs. Nautical activities centre around the marina and Pembrokeshire Yacht Club, which is located in Gellyswick. There is a golf club on the outskirts of the town, which was founded in 1913.

The village has two public houses, the "Avondale Hotel" public house in Hill Street and the "Three Crowns" public house in Hubberston Terrace

Images of Hakin
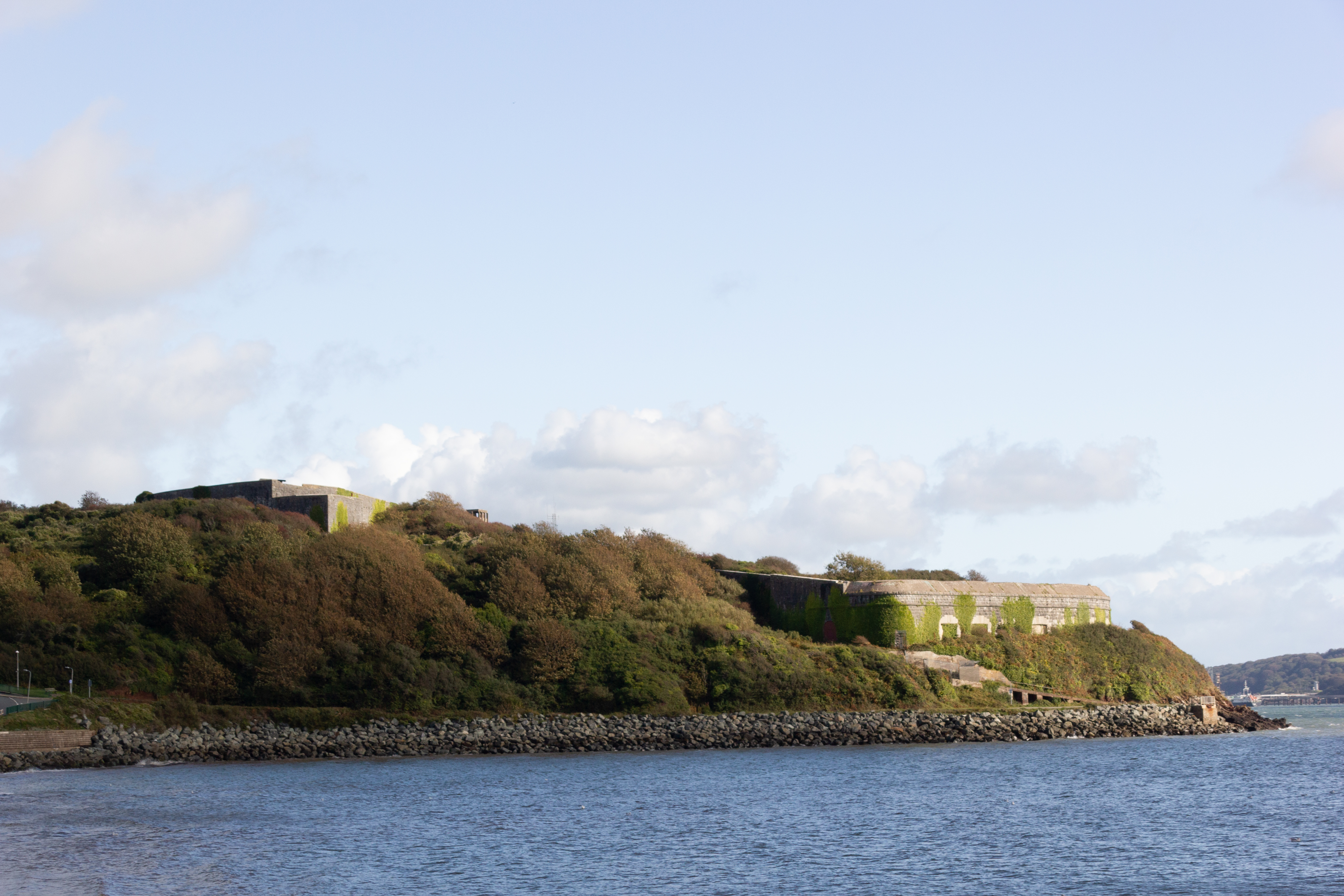
Hubberston Fort at Gelliswick

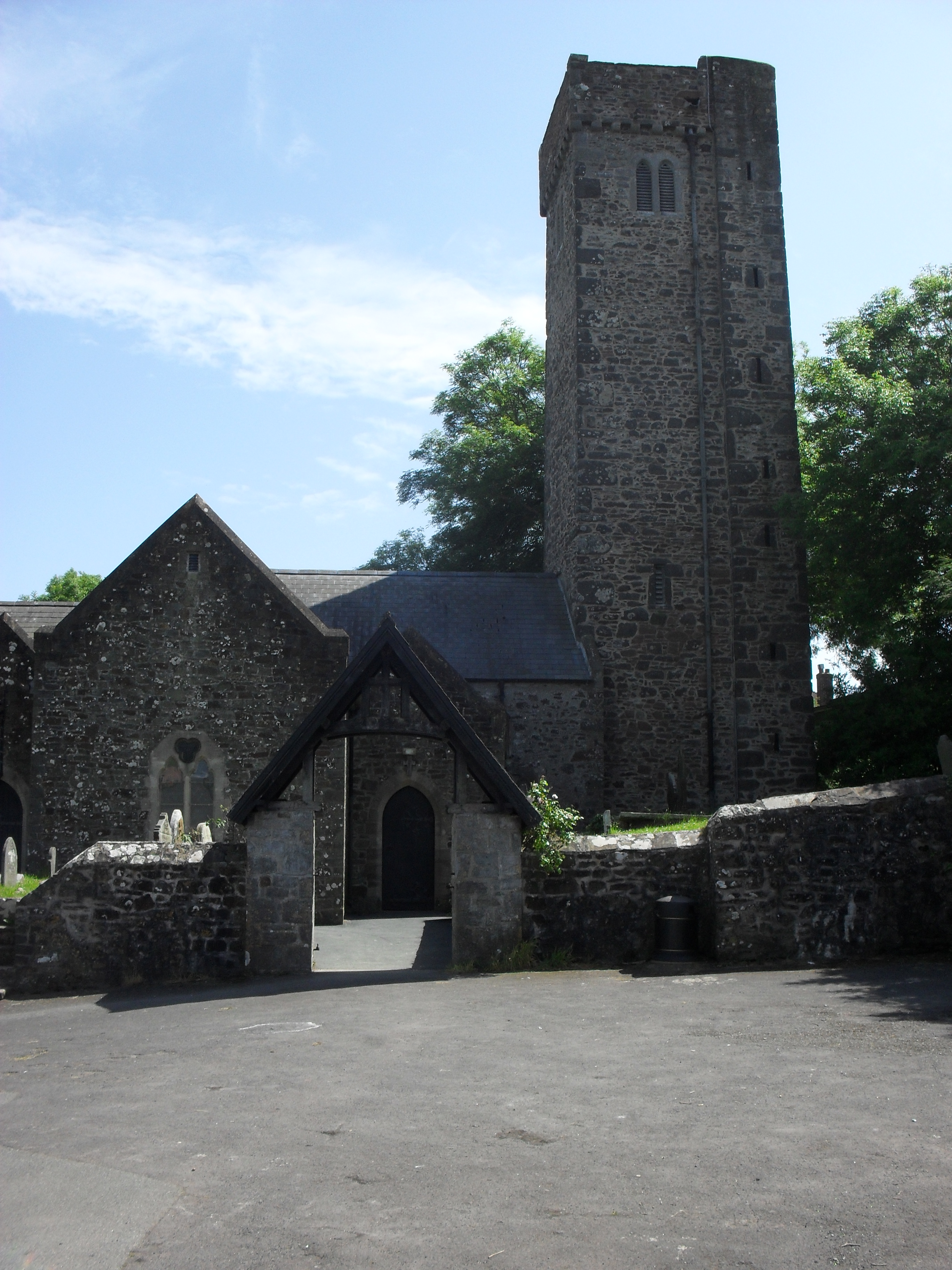
Hubberston Church

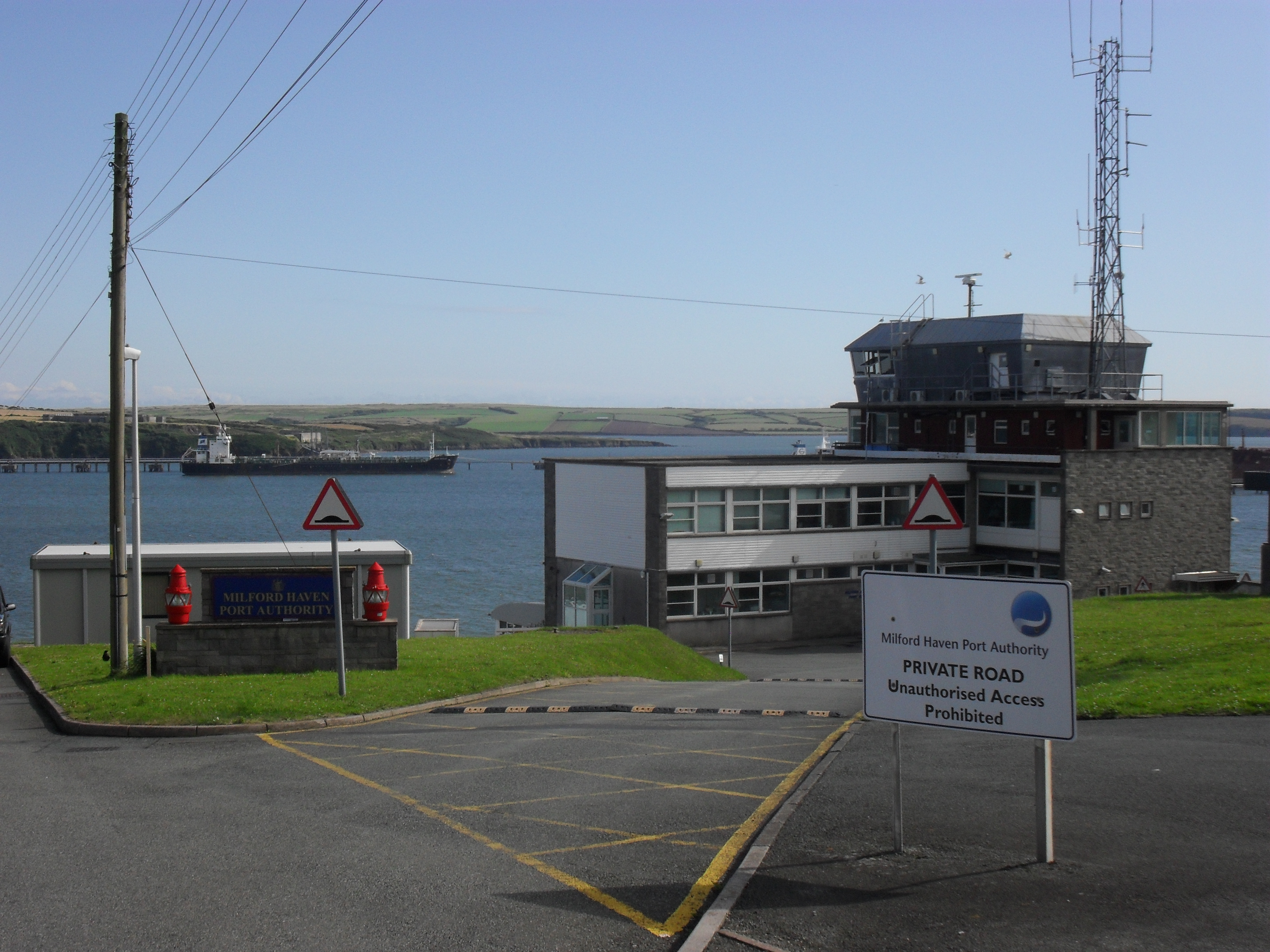
Milford Haven Port Authority, Hakin
