= South West Main Line Route Utilisation Strategy =

The South West Main Line Route Utilisation Strategy (SWML RUS) was the first Route Utilisation Strategy (RUS) to be produced under the new Network Rail regime. As such it did not completely adhere to the format that has subsequently become 'standard', and needs to be read in conjunction with the prior Draft for Consultation. It was published in May 2006 and was included in a map published by the Office of Rail Regulation as established in May 2007.

For this purpose the South West Main Line covers not only the whole of Network Rail's Route 3 - South West Main Line (with the exception of the Isle of Wight line), but also significant parts of Route 4 - Wessex, specifically Basingstoke to Exeter and routes west of Eastleigh and Redbridge (both near Southampton), as well as the Basingstoke to Reading West line of Route 13 - Great Western Main Line.

The major issue is overcrowding in the peak periods, but other issues are addressed.

== Specific measures recommended ==
=== Measures to tackle overcrowding in the peaks ===
==== Short term ====
- Short-term measures to improve mobility in the Waterloo concourse, at the expense of retail space
- Selected peak services to be lengthened, consistent with platform lengths available at Waterloo and elsewhere

==== Medium term ====
- Sophisticated ticketing and pricing systems to spread the demand during/outside the peaks
- Progressive redevelopment of Waterloo, starting with adapting Waterloo International Terminal for domestic use, including accommodating first 10-car, eventually 12-car trains.

=== Measures to improve the use of existing track capacity ===
==== Short term ====
- Revision of timetables to improve the balance of performance vs scheduled journey times
- A revised platforming strategy at Portsmouth Harbour
- Modification of service patterns mainly west of Southampton

==== Medium term ====
- Development of improved station and intermodal interchange facilities.

=== Measures to develop freight capacity in the medium term ===
Upgrading the route for freight from Southampton Container Terminal to Reading West to W10 loading gauge, to handle 9' 6" high by 2.5 metre shipping containers; this was passed to the Freight RUS.

=== Measures to improve services between Salisbury and Exeter in the medium term ===
Redoubling of selected stretches of this single-track line to provide an hourly service between Exeter and Waterloo and one extra train per hour between Exeter and Axminster
