= Cross London Route Utilisation Strategy =

The Cross London Route Utilisation Strategy (CLRUS) was the second of the route utilisation strategies (RUS) published by Network Rail (NR), in August 2006. It was included in a map published by the Office of Rail Regulation as established in May 2007.

The CLRUS covers mainly orbital railway lines in North London, including the North London line (NLL), the West London line (WLL) and the Gospel Oak to Barking line (GoBLin), but also the South London line (SLL) and, to a lesser extent, Transport for London's East London line (ELL).

== Present usage of the lines involved ==
The lines involved provide significant orbital passenger services and important freight routes, as well as other movements.

The most frequent passenger services, 4 trains per hour (tph) in each direction during the working week, are on the NLL. The WLL and the GoBLin basically have 2 tph each. There are some additional trains on all these lines during peak hours. The SLL has 2 tph. The ELL is currently closed, pending construction of northern and southern extensions; it formerly had about 5 tph.

Freight services include those having destinations on or near to the lines, as well as cross-country freight movements not originating or terminating in London, for which presently these lines are the most viable route.

== Summary of strategies derived ==
=== Short term recommendations ===
- additional peak services to overcome the worst of the peak-hour overcrowding. Transport for London (TfL) has funded the provision of at least some of these.
- additional standing space on anticipated new stock
- four-car rather than three-car trains on NLL and WLL, requiring lengthening of many platforms

=== Medium term recommendations ===
Additional services in each direction, all day, per hour:

- two trains between Stratford and Camden Road on the NLL, and onward to Queens Park on the Watford DC lines
- extending the existing two trains from Clapham to Willesden Junction onwards via the NLL to Gospel Oak and thence over the GoBLin to Barking
- diverting and extending other services on the WLL south-east to the Croydon area

=== Longer term (beyond 2014) ===
- investigating shifting of some freight services to alternative lines, some avoiding the London area, to allow more pathways with a view to achieving at least four passenger trains per hour over all the routes.

== Subsequent developments ==
Passenger services on most of the lines involved were transferred to the control of TfL on 11 November 2007, and have been rebranded London Overground. TfL and Network Rail are pursuing the recommendations in the RUS.

With the removal of the Eurostar depot to Temple Mills in November 2007, access via the WLL to the former depot at Old Oak Common is no longer required.

During autumn 2008, works requiring extended closure were conducted on extensive parts of the London Overground network, mainly to allow the passage of freight trains to W10 gauge. Further extensive works, requiring selective closure, are scheduled to be carried out in 2009 and early 2010.

Construction works on the ELL and its extensions at both ends are at an advanced stage. For example, the bridge over Shoreditch High Street that links the realigned route to Whitechapel with the Haggerston viaduct has been installed. The extended line between Dalston Junction in the north and Crystal Palace and West Croydon in the south is due to open as part of London Overground in 2010.

TfL are promising additional/replacement rolling stock commencing (as originally stated) in 2008, then 2009, now promised for 2010. However, lengthening of trains to four units, along with increase in service to 4tph over the whole network, appears to have been pushed into the medium term, planned for 2011.
