= Wales Route Utilisation Strategy =

The Wales Route Utilisation Strategy is a Route Utilisation Strategy, published by Network Rail in November 2008. It was the tenth RUS to be produced. By default, RUSs are established by the Office of Rail Regulation (ORR) unless the latter objects within 60 days. A letter formally confirming establishment was sent by ORR to Network Rail in January 2009, and the RUS is included in Network Rail's map as established.

The scope includes the whole of Strategic Routes 14 - South and Central Wales and Borders and 15 - South Wales Valleys, almost all of Route 22 - North wales and Borders, and also that part of Route 13 - Great Western Main Line west of Pilning.

As with other RUSs, the Wales RUS took into account a number of responses , including the Office of Rail Regulation (ORR).

Many of the planned enhancements in and around Newport and Cardiff areas should be effected in conjunction with scheduled signal renewals. During Control Period 4, the capability of Cardiff city centre lines will be increased to 16 trains per hour in both directions (tph), from the current 12.

The RUS began the evaluation of significant infrastructure developments in the North Wales/Merseyside areas, which was taken up in the Merseyside RUS.
