= RNMD Milford Haven =

Coordinates: 51.7074°N 5.0195°W

RNMD Milford Haven is a "decommissioned" Royal Naval Armaments Depot located on the north shore of Milford Haven between Milford Haven and Llanstadwel in the County of Pembrokeshire, Wales. The area is known as Newton Noyes.

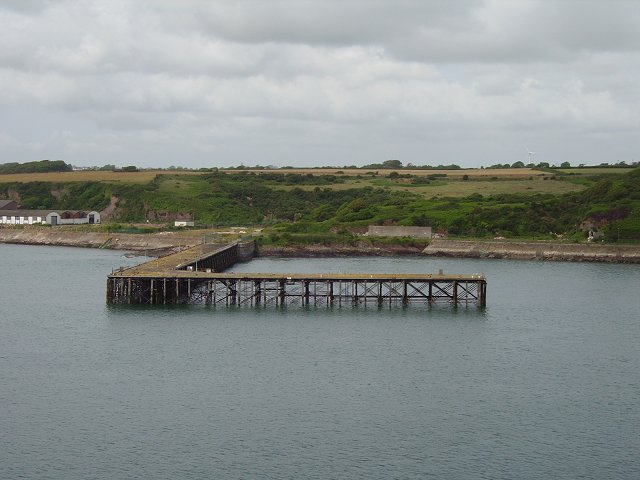
Former site of RNMD Milford with pier in foreground

== History of Site ==
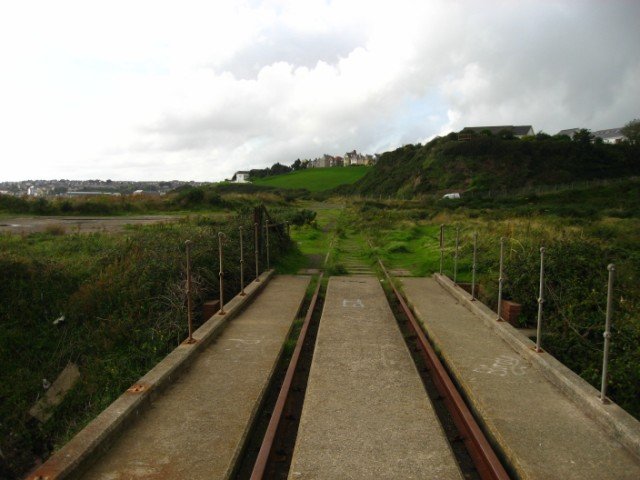
Railway track looking towards Milford Haven, across swing bridge

The Newton Noyes area had previously been occupied as a ship breakers yard. Known locally as Wards Yard, it was connected to the mainline railway via a spur from Milford Haven which crossed Castle Pill via a swing bridge. A cast iron pier, built in 1872 with the intention of encouraging transatlantic traffic to unload, allowed a rail / marine interchange.

== Construction ==
In 1934, the Admiralty purchased Thomas Ward's ship breaking yard. Construction work began the following year and by the outbreak of war in 1939 the Depot was ready for action. The site consisted of an extensive storage facility of six armament sheds, comprising tunnels built into the neighbouring valley. A reservoir was constructed on higher ground to the north in case of explosion or fire. All of the tunnels were connected by rail, which also extended to the pier. Housing for the naval officers was located near the former mansion of Castle Hall. At the height of World War II, it employed 1,000 people, and thereafter hundreds of people from the local area. By the 1970s its future was identified as being at risk.

== Closure ==
The site was closed in the 1980s. It was subsequently purchased by Gulf Oil, although the company never made any use of it. During the early 1990s, one of the buildings was converted into a sports facility. The area has been approved for large scale development into a retail and residential complex.

== Redevelopment of site ==
On 21 September 2015, Egnedol had announced that they bought the RNMD site and the old Gulf refinery and has put forward a £685 million plan to redevelop the site as a renewable energy facility. On 5 January 2017, the Port of Milford Haven announced it had completed acquisition of the western end of the site known as Wards Yard, which had been due to go to auction in December 2016.
