= Merseyside Route Utilisation Strategy =

The Merseyside Route Utilisation Strategy is a Route Utilisation Strategy published by Network Rail in March 2009. It was the eleventh RUS to be produced. By default, RUSs are established by the Office of Rail Regulation (ORR) unless the latter objects within 60 days. The RUS is included in Network Rail's map as established.

The geographic scope is described as encompassing the Merseyside "journey to work" area. As such it includes all the passenger lines in Strategic Route 21 - Merseyrail, where the main operator on these routes is the similarly named Merseyrail; also considered are adjacent parts of the network: parts of Route 20 (North West Urban), Route 23 (North West Rural) and Route 22 (North Wales and Borders).

The Merseyrail routes can be divided into the following two self-contained subnetworks:

- the Northern Line from Hunts Cross in the south-east of the urban area, across Liverpool (serving Liverpool Central, Moorfields and Sandhills), with northern branches to Southport, Ormskirk and Kirby
- the Wirral line, including the loop line connecting Moorfields, Liverpool Lime Street, Liverpool Central and James Street, the Mersey Rail Tunnel, and branches on the Wirral Peninsula to New Brighton, West Kirby, Chester and Ellesmere Port.

The City Line east of Liverpool Lime Street was explicitly covered in the North West RUS, but this RUS also makes recommendations affecting this line.

As with other RUSs, the Merseyside RUS took into account a number of responses, including the ORR.

== Groups of gaps and issues ==
The RUS identifies the following generic types of gaps and issues:

1. existing and future crowding at stations at certain times
2. likely future overcrowding on peak traffic services
3. service frequencies below similar communities and localised lack of connection to the network
4. lack of car parking and poor interchange services and facilities more generally
5. specific punctuality and reliability issues

A particular issue on the network is the capacity of Liverpool Central station to handle the number of passengers arriving and departing. Unusually, the main peak crowding is on Saturdays among shopping and leisure trippers. Main interventions to solve this problem will also provide adequate handling weekday peak traffic. In the near term, limited improvements will produce about 30% more circulating capacity; by 2015 more intrusive changes will be required to handle the increased level of passengers; for the longer term a much more comprehensive scheme is required.

Generally recommended solutions fall into the following timescales. The main gaps addressed (as above) are indicated in the descriptions.

=== Short term (CP4 to March 2014) ===
Some peak services will be increased in length (2) in the very short term using rolling stock displaced from elsewhere; by 2014 the fleet will be replaced with a prospective additional 14 3-car units. The Chester-Liverpool off-peak service frequency will be doubled to every 15 minutes (3,5), with some of these made partly semi-fast. The Wigan-Liverpool off-peak frequency should be increased from 3 trains per hour (tph) in each direction (3).

A study is being conducted by Merseyrail into a short extension of the electrified route east of Kirby to Headbolt Lane, where a park-and-ride scheme would be built (3,4).

=== Medium term (CP5 to March 2019) ===
Some further peak services will be also increased in length (2). Peak frequency should be increased on the Southport route (2). There could be an extension of electrification and a new freight route into Liverpool Docks.

Skelmersdale is a significant urban centre but not connected to the rail network. There should be a study of the possibility of an electrified chord from Upholland with through services to Liverpool (3).

Other enhanced services could include Wrexham to Bidston (3) and Ormskirk to Southport via Burscough Bridge (3).

=== Longer term (CP6 onwards) ===
Further lengthening will probably be required on shoulder peak and inter-peak trains (2). In the peaks the main developments will need to be in infrastructure to support more frequent services (2), especially on the Southport and Ormskirk branches of the Northern Line, and the West Kirby and Chester branches of the Wirral Line.

Extension of electrification, possibly partly using dual-voltage stock, might be justifiable. The tram-train concept might be applicable in Liverpool. Infrastructure that is currently freight-only or out of use could be adapted for passenger use.
