= Network Route Utilisation Strategy =

Long-term plans for British rail infrastructure

The Network Route Utilisation Strategy (Network RUS) is a Route Utilisation Strategy (RUS) produced by Network Rail (NR). The Network RUS is one of only two (the Freight RUS is the other) which have the perspective of the network as whole; most of NR's RUSs are geographical, mainly regional, in nature. Uniquely the Network RUS is divided into four separate workstreams each of which has its own management team and documentary outputs, effectively an RUS in its own right.

RUSs are established by the Office of Rail Regulation (ORR) unless the latter objects within 60 days. As at mid-March 2010 two workstreams had been published and established (the Scenarios & Long Distance Forecasts workstream and the Electrification workstream); they are consequently included in Network Rail's map as established, and it is expected that the others will be included as they are published and established.

By definition the geographic scope is the whole Network Rail network.

== The Scenarios & Long Distance Forecasts workstream ==
This workstream was published in June 2009. Originally it was to be called the Review of RUSs/Long Distance train statement, and an appropriate scoping document was accordingly published on the website. By shortly before the publication of the draft document, the perspective had been changed to Long-distance services and Scenarios, and continued to be described as such on the Network Rail map even after publication of the draft, which like the final version had the above title. By the time of the publication of the draft the original scoping document was removed from the website, and not replaced, with no explicit explanation.

Unlike other RUSs and the electrification workstream this workstream does not consider any specific rail interventions. Instead the main focus of the document is to promote the concept of the use of 'Scenarios' to help determine possible variations in future demand for rail travel, in particular for trips over 50 miles. In contrast to other RUSs there is no consideration of short-term (CP4) or medium-term factors (CP5); the 'long-term' in passenger demand focussed on is overwhelmingly the year 2036, which is well beyond the time horizon of other RUSs (a single table suggests passenger growth rates to 2021); freight growth is considered to 2031.

As with other RUSs, the Scenarios workstream RUS invited responses from interested parties. The NR website acknowledged a number of responses, including the Office of Rail Regulation (ORR).

== The Electrification workstream ==
This workstream was published on 28 October 2009, having been issued as a draft for consultation in May 2009.

The workstream identified four types of 'gap' potentially fulfilled by further electrification:

- Type A : where electrification would enable more efficient operation of passenger services
- Type B : where electrification would enable more efficient operation of freight services
- Type C: where electrification could provide diversionary route capacity
- Type D: where electrification could enable a new service to operate

Four tables provide a matrix of potential lines to be electrified under one or more of the above types. Possible mainly passenger lines are ranked into 6 tiers (1 being the best case, 6 the worst).

To some extent the final conclusions of the workstream were overtaken during consultation by the Government's announcement of the approval of the electrification of major parts of the Great Western Main Line and the Liverpool-Chat Moss-Manchester line. However, no further announcements have been made as regards the two further main projects recommended by the workstream, the Midland Main Line and the Gospel Oak to Barking line.

== The Stations workstream ==
A Final remit was agreed in 2007.

According to the Network Rail website, a draft for consultation was previously expected in November 2009. As at early November 2009, the website stated that the date of publication of both the draft and the final version were "To be determined"; as at mid-February 2010 the projected publication date is "Early 2011" and its status is "In process".

A publication that appears to fulfill part of the Stations remit is included on the NR website under the Other publications link of the Network RUS page.

== The Rolling Stock and Depots workstream ==
A Final remit was agreed in 2007.

As at early November 2009, the NR website stated that the date of publication of both the draft and the final version were "To be determined"; as at mid-February 2010 the projected publication date is "early 2011" and its status is "In process".
