= Freight route utilisation strategy =

The Freight Route Utilisation Strategy is a Route Utilisation Strategy in the United Kingdom, published by Network Rail in March 2007. It is one of only two (the Network RUS is the other) which have the perspective of the network as whole. It was included in a map published by the Office of Rail Regulation (ORR) as established in May 2007. As with other RUSs, the Freight RUS took into account a number of responses to a Draft for Consultation, including those from the ORR.

To quote the foreword:

Rail freight...has grown rapidly in the last 10 years...this strategy forecasts further growth of up to 30 percent [sic] – the equivalent of an extra 240 freight trains per day – over the next ten years [to 2014/5 from 2004/5]. For this additional demand to be met by road freight...would lead to around an extra 1.5 million lorry journeys on the roads each year.

The study recommended a number of approaches and enhancements to the network. Like other strategies in this series, recommendations are divided into short-term (Control Period 3, CP3, to March 2009), medium-term (CP4, to March 2014), and long-term (CP5, thereafter).

A notable recommendation is the enhancement of the loading gauge from Southampton and the East Anglia coast ports to the West Coast Main Line (WCML), as most growth was expected in the carriage of deep-sea containers and coal for the electricity-generating industry, mainly for the Trent valley and Aire valley power stations. Much coal is imported via the east coast ports.

A key issue is the loading gauge of routes for freight in sea-going (9' 6" in height, 2500 mm in width) containers. Such loads are accommodated on routes cleared to W10 on standard wagons. W12 is only slightly wider than W10, and the Freight RUS recommended that where structures are renewed the starting assumption should be that they are cleared to W12.

Unlike passenger services, which over the course of a day tend to have comparable flows in both directions, freight movements are unidirectional. Even though rolling stock usually needs to return to the original departure point, this may be via a different route, and constraints arising from fully loaded trains and steep gradients may disappear for returning empty trains.

== Recommendations by route ==
=== West Coast Main Line (WCML) ===
Short term: Freight operators' requirements to be included in the December 2008 recasting of the WCML timetable; some services to be rerouted away from Stafford, via Macclesfield; new loop at Hartford, Cheshire.

Medium term: Electric haulage of some new freight traffic between Crewe/Warrington and Carlisle/Glasgow; diversion of some services via the Settle and Carlisle route; W10 and extra capacity between Peterborough and Nuneaton to provide five additional paths from Felixstowe to Nuneaton, avoiding the southern part of the WCML.

Long term: Infrastructure to allow the lengthening of container trains serving the Haven ports (see below) from 24 to 30 waggons; major enhancements in the Stafford area and to the Felixstowe to Nuneaton route (the latter to allow more capacity, to avoid the southern WCML).

=== Anglo-Scottish coal route ===
This route is from the Ayrshire coast and open-cast mines to the Aire and Trent valley power stations. Recommendations are mainly short term, involving redoubling of the Annan-Gretna route and speeding up the junction with the WCML, and signalling enhancements to the Settle and Carlisle route.

=== Haven ports to the WCML ===
The Haven ports are Felistowe, Ipswich (F2N), and Harwich.

Short term: Capacity upgrades paid for by Hutchison Ports UK in return for planning permission for port expansion, including W10 clearance between Ipswich and Doncaster via Peterborough; growth in demand to be accommodated via the North London line (NLL).

Medium term: W10 clearance west of the East Coast Main Line (ECML) to Leicester and Nuneaton, together with other capacity enhancements to avoid the southern part of the WCML; also W10 clearance of the Barking to Gospel Oak line to allow trains from North Thameside to avoid the NLL, leaving more paths for Haven ports trains.

Long term: Infrastructure to allow the lengthening of container trains from 24 to 30 waggons.

=== East Coast ports to the Aire and Trent Valley power stations ===
For this purpose the East Coast ports are Blyth, Tyneside, Teesport (Redcar), Hull and Immingham.

Short term: Timetable changes and train lengthening to/from Immingham (already implemented by the time of the RUS publication); Brigg line and Wrawby junction enhancements; Hull Docks branch partial doubling; restoring of Boldon East curve to provide access to Durham Coast line avoiding congested parts of ECML.

Medium term: A loop on the Killingholme branch line (former Barton and Immingham Light Railway track) near Immingham; a chord from the Brigg line to Cottam Power Station, providing direct access from Immingham; signalling enhancement at Selby and a loop at nearby Barlby, allowing lengthening of trains to/from Hull.

Long term: Protection of the route of the mothballed Leamside Line near Tyneside.

=== Southampton to WCML ===
Short term: Signalling enhancements on the route from Leamington to the WCML via Birmingham (this route provides an alternative to the most direct route via Coventry and Nuneaton).

Medium term: W10 clearance of

- the core route via Eastleigh, Reading West Jct, Leamington and Nuneaton
- the alternative Leamington-WCML route via Birmingham (Sutton Park Line)
- possibly southern diversionary routes via Melksham and/or Laverstock/Andover.

Long term: Possible grade separation at Reading West Jct.

== Subsequent developments ==
=== Projects at various stages ===
Completed: Annan-Gretna redoubling, Brigg line and Wrawby junction enhancements, partial doubling of the Hull Docks branch.

Funded and authorised to completion: W10 clearance through Ipswich and Peterborough to Doncaster and Yorkshire terminals (Doncaster International Railport, Selby Potter Group, Wakefield Europort and Leeds Stourton); Settle and Carlisle enhancements, including extra intermediate block signalling; Gospel Oak to Barking W9 and W10 clearance; Hampstead Tunnel W10 clearance.

Authorised to GRIP stage 3, 4 or 5, for implementation in CP4: Peterborough to Nuneaton gauge improvements; Southampton – West Coast Main Line gauge enhancements. Enhancements to North London Line (east of Camden Road), including signalling enhancements, four-tracking and additional freight loops, are scheduled for implementation also in CP4, probably funded by Transport for London.

Boldon East curve being pursued for CP4.

=== DfT's 2007 HLOS ===
The UK Government's Department for Transport (DfT) published in July 2007 a White Paper 'Delivering a Sustainable Railway', intended to provide strategic direction for the rail industry. This contained the High Level Output Specification (HLOS) of funds available, covering the period 1 April 2009 to 31 March 2014, in accordance with a statutory duty set by the Railways Act 2005 to state quinquennially the quantum of public expenditure to be devoted to rail. It specifies what the Government requires the railway to deliver, especially in relation to safety, reliability and capacity.

The White Paper also takes a 30-year view on strategy for the national railway network, emphasising partnership between the Government and the rail industry, and identifying three long-term themes: increasing the capacity of the network, providing a quality and reliable service for passengers, and enhancing rail's environmental potential. It also endorses the Freight RUS, and in Chapter 9, which deals explicitly with freight, moots the development of a Strategic Freight Network going beyond the RUS, but without specific detail.
