= History of Milford Haven =

The town of Milford Haven was founded in 1793 by Sir William Hamilton, who initially invited Quaker whalers from Nantucket to live in his town, and then, in 1797, the Navy Board to create a dockyard for building warships.

Milford Haven Waterway has a longer history as a staging point on sea journeys to Ireland, and was used as a shelter by Vikings.

== Early history ==
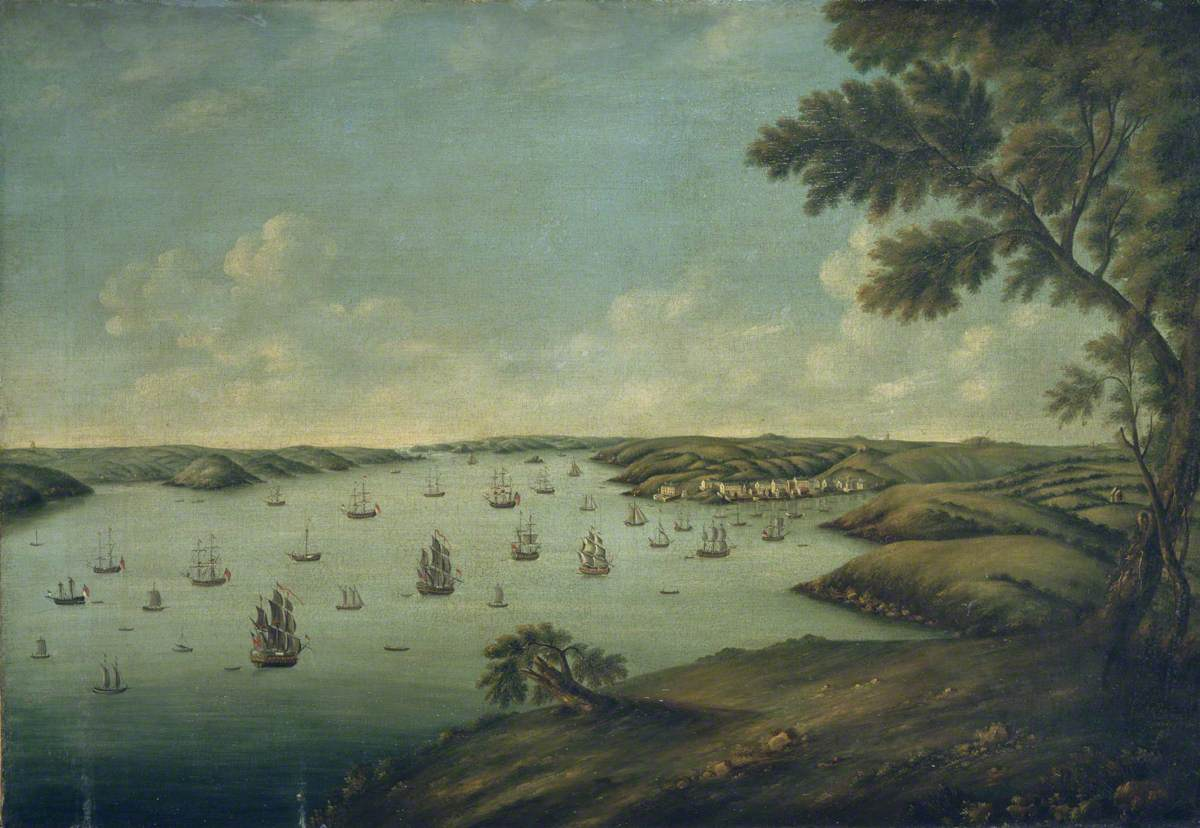
Milford Haven by Attwood, 1776

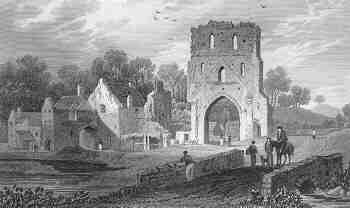
Pill Priory near Milford Haven 1829, Henry Gastineau

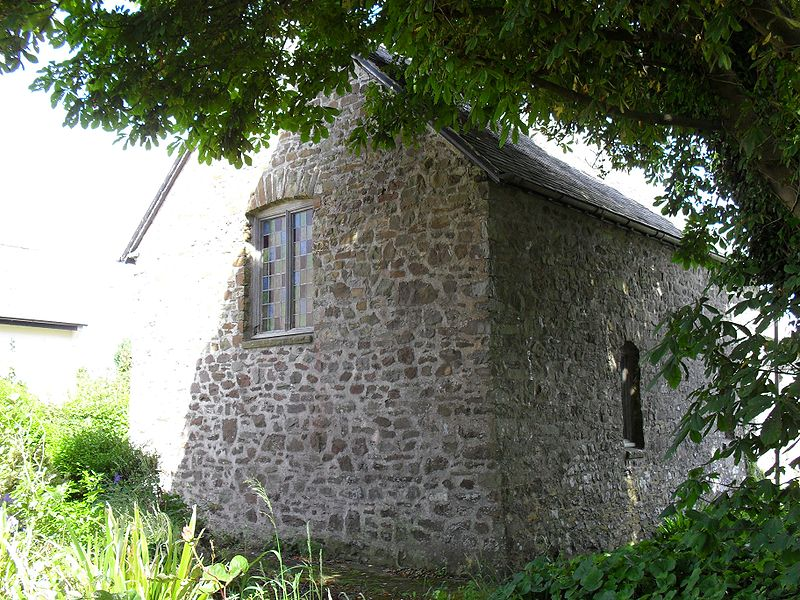
St Thomas a Becket Chapel, dedicated 1180 and used as a beacon church

From the 790s until the Norman Invasion in 1066, the waterway was used occasionally by Vikings looking for shelter. During one visit in 854, the Viking chieftain Hubba wintered in the Haven with 23 ships, eventually lending his name to the district of Hubberston. It is likely that the area was used as a permanent headquarters in the period after 914, to provide a staging post for traffic in the Celtic Sea. Evidence of metal working in the area was recently excavated, suggesting a level of industrialization in the period 750 - 1100. Additionally, the remains of early hill forts at Thornton and Priory have been identified, which commanded excellent views over the landscape. A medieval castle was constructed towards the east of the town's boundaries, at the head of the inlet known as Castle Pill.

A Benedictine priory called Pill Priory was established at the head of Hubberston Pill in 1170, as a daughter house of St Dogmaels Abbey. Built on virgin land, it stood alongside the priory on Caldey Island as part of the Tironian Order in West Wales, and was dedicated to St Budoc. Founded by Adam de Rupe, it stood until the Dissolution under Henry VIII. Richard de Clare commenced his invasion of Leinster from the Haven in 1167. In 1171 Henry II designated the area the rendezvous for his Irish expedition. An army of 400 warships, 500 knights and 4,000 men-at-arms gathered in the haven before sailing to Waterford, and on to Dublin, which marked the first time an English king had stood on Irish soil, and the beginning of Henry's invasion of Ireland. Henry's son John sailed form the area twice to subdue the Irish, in 1185 and 1210. St Thomas à Becket Chapel was dedicated to St Thomas Becket in 1180, a structure which looked out over the Haven from the north shore of the town. In later years it was used as a beacon for sailors in foul weather, and ultimately as a pig sty, until it was reconsecrated in the 20th century.

In his play Cymbeline Act 3, Scene 2 (1611), Shakespeare remarks that Milford is a haven:

...how far it is to this same blessed Milford: and by the way tell me how Wales was made so happy as to inherit such a haven...

George Owen of Henllys, in his Description of Penbrokshire, claimed in 1603 that Milford Haven was the most famous port of Christendom. The area however was a source of anxiety for the Tudor monarchy. Due to its location, it was exposed to attacks from Ireland, a convenient base from which England could be invaded via Wales. In 1405, the French landed in force having left Brest in July with more than 2,800 knights and men-at-arms led by Jean II de Rieux, the Marshal of France, in order to support Owain Glyndŵr's rebellion. It was here that Henry Tudor landed with his uncle, Jasper Tudor, in 1485 before his march towards Lincolnshire, ending in the Battle of Bosworth.

The Tudor era began to recognise the strategic importance of defence of the area, and Thomas Cromwell highlighted this fact to the Council of the Marches of Wales. Some 40 years later, this led to the construction of device forts at West Blockhouse and East Blockhouse. Milford Haven was one of the objectives during the Spanish Armada of 1597, and possible landing places were examined. George Owen had recommended the construction of forts at Dale Point, Thorn Island and Stack Rock, but no action was taken. Although a storm dispersed much of the Armada, some Spanish ships pressed on and landfall was made in the Cleddau. The arrival of Welsh militia and the dispersal of their fleet however soon forced the Spanish to retreat. One of the ships, a forty-ton caravel Nuestra Senora Buenviage which had been damaged in the storm attempted to flee but was boarded and captured by six Welsh boats and thus pillaged. The cargo included gold and silver and as a result a fight broke out amongst the pillagers in which one man was wounded. Piracy was also recognised as a problem, perhaps encouraged by the lack of fortification and nature of the landscape. The Queen's Remembrancer Roll of 1562 reported that:

...Milford is ye grete resort and sucoure of all piratts...

In April 1603, Martin Pring used the Haven as his departure point for his exploratory voyage to Virginia. The land comprising the site of Milford, the Manor of Hubberston and Pill, was acquired by the Barlow family following the Dissolution of the Monasteries in the mid-16th century. It acquired an additional strategic importance in the 17th century as a Royalist military base. Charles I ordered a fort to be built at Pill which could prevent re-enforcement of the Parliamentarian garrison of Pembroke Castle, and this was completed in 1643. On 23 February 1644, a Parliamentarian force led by Rowland Laugharne crossed the Haven and landed at Castle Pill. The fort was gunned from both land and water, and a garrison was placed in Steynton church to prevent a Royalist attack from the garrison at Haverfordwest. The fort was eventually surrendered, and quickly taken, along with St Thomas a Becket chapel. Just five years later in 1649 Milford Haven was again the site of Parliamentarian interest when it was chosen as the disembarkation site for Oliver Cromwell's invasion of Ireland. Cromwell arrived in the Haven on 4 August, meeting George Monck, before Cromwell and over a hundred craft left for Dublin on 15 August.

By the late 18th century, the two creeks which would delimit the future town of Milford's boundaries to the east and west, namely Hakin and Castle Pill, were being used as harbours for ships to load and unload coal, corn and limestone. A ferry service to Ireland operated from Hakin around the start of the 20th century, although this ceased in the early 19th century. Although surrounding settlements at Steynton, Thornton, Priory, Liddeston and Hubberston/Hakin were established, they were little more than hamlets. The only man-made structures on the future site of Milford were the medieval chapel, and Summer Hill Farm, and its accompanying cottages.

== The 18th century − Foundation ==
Hubberston and Pill, Pembroke, Docks and Piers Act 1790
- Act of Parliament
- Parliament of Great Britain
- Long title: An Act to enable Sir William Hamilton, Knight of the Most Honourable Order of the Bath, his Heirs and Assigns, to make and provide Quays, Docks, Piers, and other Erections, and to establish a Market with proper Roads and Avenues thereto respectively, within the Manor or Lordship of Hubberstone and Pill, in the County of Pembroke.
- Citation: 30 Geo. 3. c. 55
- Territorial extent: Great Britain

Dates
- Royal assent: 9 June 1790
- Commencement: 21 January 1790 (Note: Start of session.)

Status: Current legislation

Text of statute as originally enacted

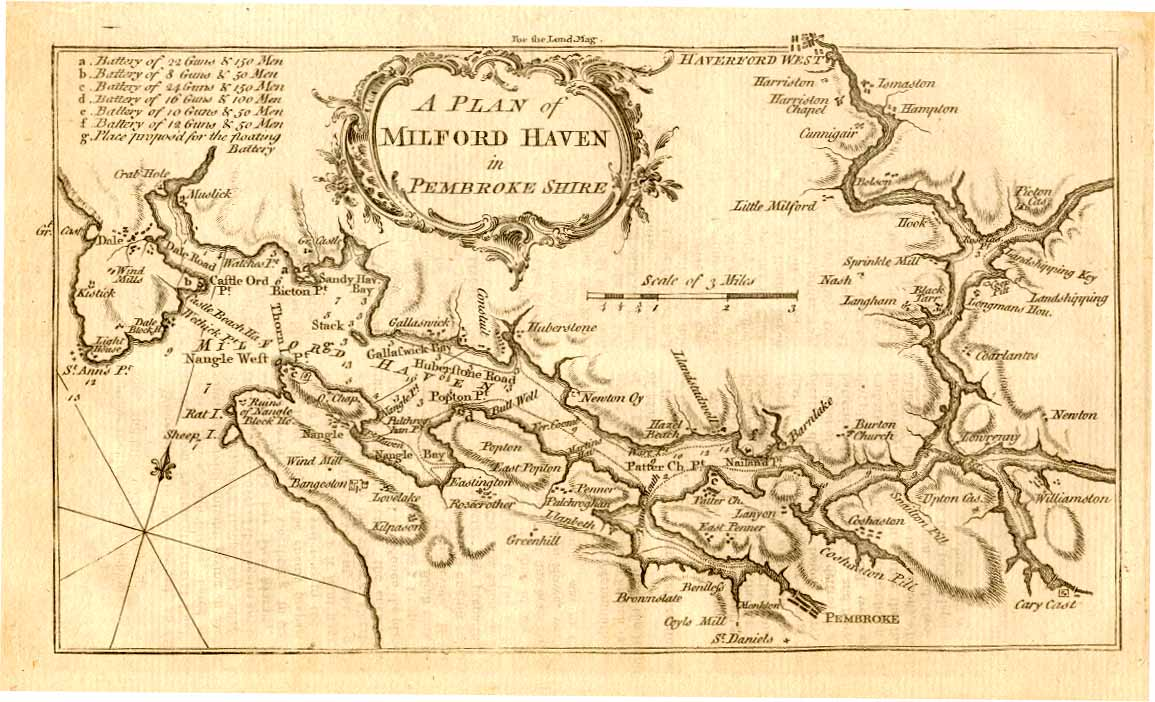
A plan of Milford Haven, 1758

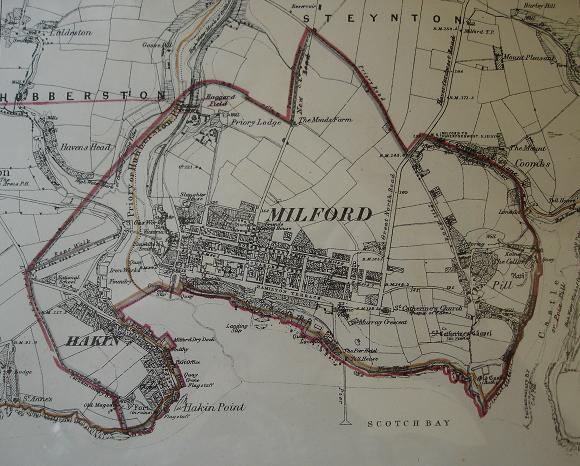
Street plan of Milford Haven, 1868

By the mid 18th century, the lands had been inherited by Catherine Barlow of Slebech, who at the time was living in London. In 1758 she married Sir William Hamilton, and on her death in 1782, he inherited the land in the Hubberston and Pill area. He became interested in the Pembrokeshire Coalfield, and the idea of developing the land and harbour into a town. Hon. Charles Francis Greville, his nephew, was given responsibility for managing the project, and an act of Parliament, the Hubberston and Pill, Pembroke, Docks and Piers Act 1790 (30 Geo. 3. c. 55), was granted which made it possible to continue. In 1791, Mary Morgan visited Hubberston on a tour of Wales, and noted in her journal:

"And now I shall extend the scene, and carry you to Milford Haven.... It is said that Mr Greville, the nephew of Sir William Hamilton... is going to build a handsome town there. It will be a public benefit, as it will produce a great accession of trade to this corner of the country."

There had been a Quaker population in Pembrokeshire since 1650, although its numbers had been in decline following emigration to North America. Greville, supported by Sir William Harcourt, proceeded to invite seven Nantucket Quaker families to settle in the new town, and in 1792 they arrived, led by the Starbuck family, with the intention of developing a whaling fleet to service the growing demand for street lighting. Greville had highlighted the opportunities for trade with the Americas from the town to the New Englanders, and lobbied the Board of Trade to support the plan. A lack of suitable accommodation in the town encouraged building of residential properties on undeveloped land above the harbour, which had been organised into three long streets, terraced back one from the other, with intersecting side streets. The Front Street housed austere homes for the Quakers, which allowed them to look out to sea in keeping with the Nantucket style. The Middle Street became the commercial centre, and the back street housed artisans. The frequent claim that an American gridiron pattern was used may not have been as integral to the design as the fact that the topography of the landscape required it, the steep gradient preventing other designs. Several important Quaker families established large homes during this time, including Samuel Starbuck Sr at Priory Lodge and Uriah Bunker at Bunkers Hill, and by 1810 the town could boast 150 houses, businesses and a hotel. In 1797 the Navy Board established a dockyard which produced warships. Seven royal vessels were eventually launched from the dockyard, including HMS Surprise and HMS Milford. Progress was rapid, and by 1802, Admiral Horatio Nelson had been invited to view the town in person as part of a tour to celebrate the anniversary of the Battle of the Nile. He spoke glowingly during a banquet held in his honour, commenting on the number of whaleships sent to the Southern Oceans, Milford's status as a primary seaport on the west coast of Britain, and culminated in comparing the harbour with that of Trincomalee in Sri Lanka as to be the two best he had ever seen. Greville's plans were no less ambitious. At a site on high ground in Hakin, he planned to build "The College of King George the Third founded at Milford", whose centrepiece would be an observatory. Although the observatory was built, and indeed scientific instruments were delivered, the college never functioned as such. A church, dedicated to St Catherine of Alexandria, was consecrated in October 1808. Located in the underdeveloped eastern side of the town, it remained a chapel of ease until 1891 when Milford became a parish, until that time competing with St Peter and St Cewydd in Steynton. By around the start of the 19th century, a mail coach was operating between London and Hubberston, arriving in the evening and returning the following day, connecting with the packet service to Ireland. In 1800 the short-lived Milford and Pembrokeshire Bank was established by Thomas Phillips, operating from a branch in the town. It collapsed in 1810.

== The 19th century − Development of the town ==
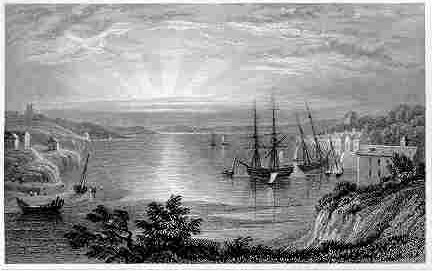
View of Milford Haven from Hakin in 1829

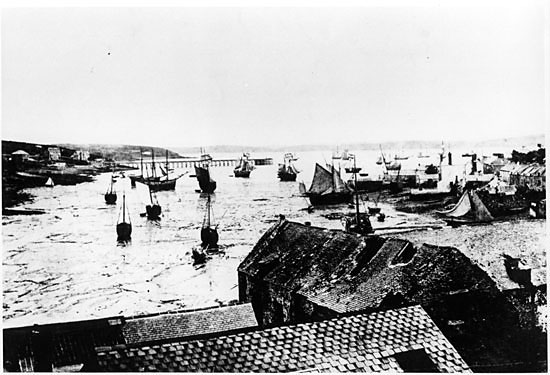
Milford Harbour Pre-Dockyard

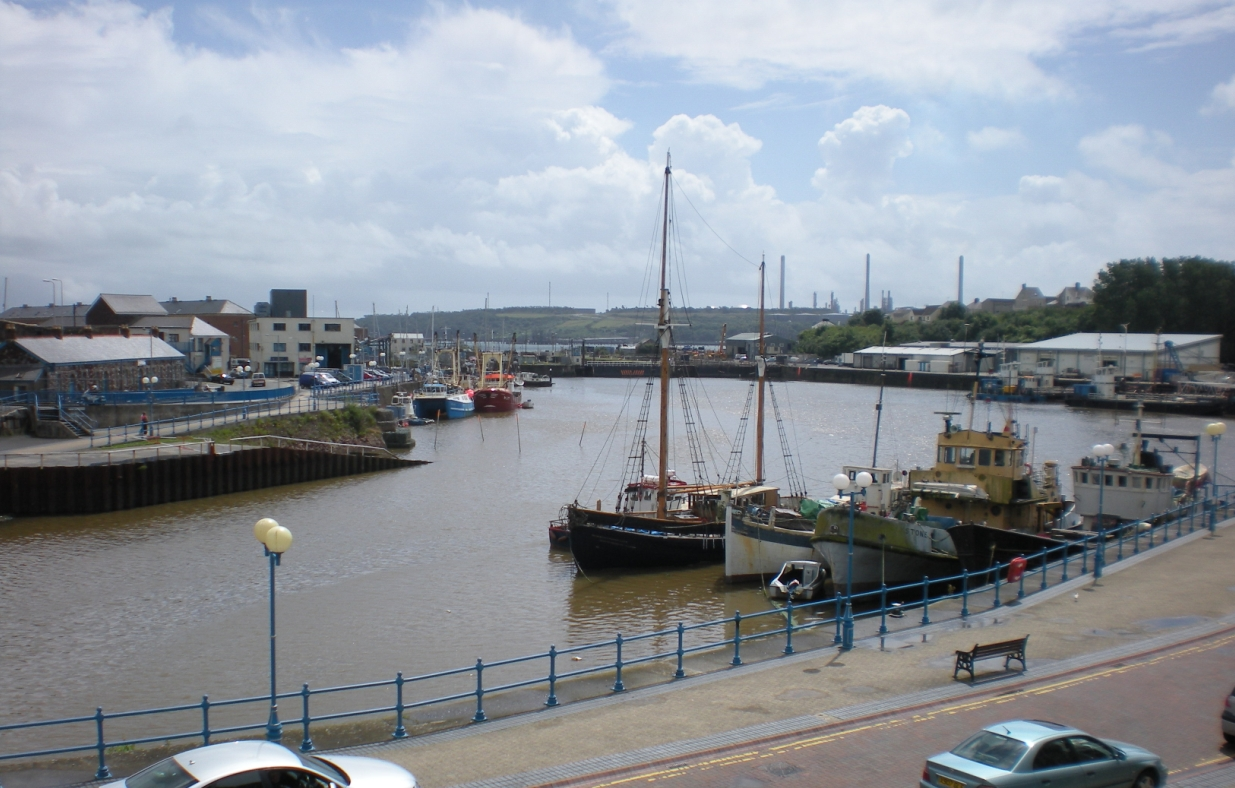
Milford Docks 2009

Between 1801 and 1803, the town and waterway were protected by temporary batteries at Hakin Point and south of St Katherine's Church, in response to the perceived threat following the Fishguard Invasion. In 1814 the Royal Dockyard was transferred to Pembroke Dock, which quickly reduced the fortunes of the new town. John Bartholomew commented in 1887 that Milford was in a languishing state, although he noted that the commercial docks, at that time under construction, "will probably become a great seat of trade with America." Robert Fulke Greville inherited the estate in 1824, and in 1853 relocated to the town. He commenced a series of improvements, including the building of a wooden pier and hotel for the Irish traffic and two bridges across Milford's two pills (accompanied by toll houses). The Milford Improvement Act 1857 (20 & 21 Vict. c. 74) appointed improvement commissioners to run the town.

Milford Docks Act 1874
- Act of Parliament
- Parliament of the United Kingdom
- Long title: An Act for authorising the construction of Docks and other Works upon or near Hubberston Pill at Milford, in the county of Pembroke; and for other purposes.
- Citation: 37 & 38 Vict. c. lxvii

Dates
- Royal assent: 30 June 1874

Text of statute as originally enacted

The town's population was further boosted by Quaker whalers from Nantucket, and a growing fishing industry that employed a large number of people. By 1849, the district of Hakin was described as a considerable centre of boat building, with approximately 200 "shipwrights residing at that place". The Milford Docks Act 1874 (37 & 38 Vict. c. lxvii) authorised the construction of a docks in Hubberston Pill, a plan which was estimated to require two and a half years before completion. Actual completion was not achieved until 1888, delayed in part due to the bankruptcy of Samuel Lake. Contemporary speculation suggested that a journey between London and New York via Milford would now be possible in less than seven days, two days fewer than the voyage on the established Liverpool route. There was also considerable thought given to a proposed "Montreal & Milford Line", linking the two ports and potentially cutting the journey time even further than that of New York. It was eventually finished in 1888, but the transatlantic trade hoped for never materialized. Instead, the newly completed dockyard became the home of a sprawling fishing industry. By 1906, Milford had become the sixth largest fishing port in the UK, and in contrast to the general decline in Pembrokeshire's economy and a migration towards the South Wales Coal fields during the 1880s, its population rose. The Pembrokeshire Herald claimed in 1912 that "the fish trade is Milford's sole industry....the population of the town has doubled by means of it". In 1863, the railway network came to Milford, linking it to the Haverfordwest line and beyond. In 1866, work was completed on an additional extension which provided access to the docks and mining depot on the eastern side of the town. If the Manchester and Milford Railway scheme had come to fruition, the town would have enjoyed a direct rail link to the Midlands and Northwest England.

Between 1875 and 1886 the Great Eastern was a permanent fixture at Milford Docks, remaining there for lengthy repairs. Her arrival into the docks, marked by an artillery salute and town festivities, was heralded as an example of the scale of vessel which the town could expect to attract. On 24 October 1889, the liner City of Rome, part of the Anchor Line fleet, arrived from New York City into the Haven. She anchored in Hubberston Roads, and her 134 passengers immediately transferred to a train at the new station, bound for London. They carried mainly employees of Barnum's Circus about to commence a European tour, and this represented one of the few examples of transatlantic traffic flowing through the town. January 1900 saw the docks become the temporary home of the City of Paris liner, where it underwent light repairs after running aground off the coast of Cornwall. In the late 1850s, work began on a network of forts on both sides of the Milford Haven estuary, as a direct result of the Royal Commission on the Defence of the United Kingdom. They were designed with the intention of defending the United Kingdom against French invasion, although were never used for this purpose. Notable examples in the town were Fort Hubberstone in Gelliswick.

In December 1894 the Milford Improvement Commissioners were replaced by Milford Haven Urban District Council under the Local Government Act 1894.

== The 20th century ==
"Milford Haven - Where Fish Comes From" - Great Western Railway poster by John Hassall, 1921

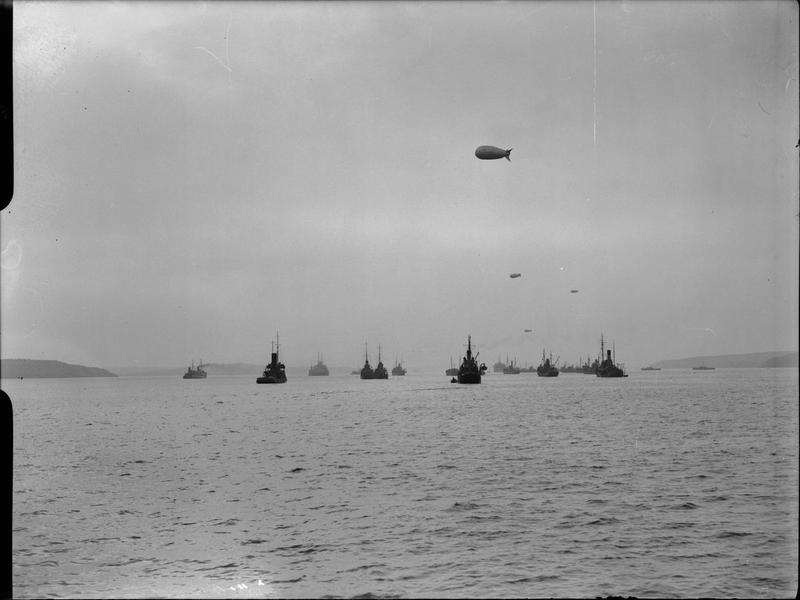
A British convoy, with balloon protection, leaving the port of Milford Haven during WW2.

By 1901, the town's population had reached 5,102, and by 1931 had doubled to 10,104. During World War I, the Haven was an assembly point for convoys to Gibraltar, and a base, under the command of R.N.R. Captain (and retired Admiral) Charles Holcombe Dare, to counter the activity of German U-boats off the coast of Pembrokeshire. The town welcomed many Belgian refugees from Ostend, many of whom had known the area through landing fish; they bolstered the fishing fleet, depleted by war service, and later erected a memorial in gratitude. The early 20th century saw a period of increased urbanization of the area. The land immediately back from Hamilton Terrace, bounded by Robert St, Priory Road and Great North Road was now completely built upon. In the period from the First World War to 1937, 312 council houses were built in a variety of locations, including estates at Hakinville, Prioryville, Glebelands and Prescelly Place. In 1926 the Urban District Council completed work on an electricity plant, thereby completing the electrification of the town, at a cost of £70,000. A sewerage plant followed in 1930, the Prescelly Waterworks in 1932, and in the same year the original toll bridge linking Milford and Hakin was replaced with Victoria Bridge. The steep gradient of the Rath was at this time constructed, and in 1939 Milford Haven Town Hall was opened on Hamilton Terrace, at that time possessing an inbuilt fire station. 1939 also saw the opening of an outdoor swimming pool on the Rath. During the Second World War Milford Haven was chosen as a base for allied American troops, and roughly 1,000 American military personnel were housed in the town at this time. They manned an amphibious base which included a hospital built in Hakin and a docks complex at Newton Noyes. The base, initially commanded by Rear Admiral P. E. Phillips and from 1942 by Vice-Admiral Fairbairn, had a complement of 71 officers and 902 enlisted men, and played a role in preparations for D-Day. A focus of activity for the base included mine sweeping of the Haven, which was subject to aircraft attack on 50 occasions. Milford town escaped serious damage from German bombings during the Second World War however, and bombs were seldom dropped on land. Despite its strategic importance as the home of a large fish market, a mines depot, a flax factory, and housing numerous military personnel, a co-ordinated attack on the town never materialised. In the summer of 1941 a bomb fell in fields near Priory Road, and later that year, a bomb damaged a house in Brooke Avenue. In neither instance were there casualties. August 1941 saw the Meades Farm hit in an unsuccessful attack on Air Ministry underground petroleum tanks in Priory Pill, which resulted in non fatal injuries. Due to it strategic importance as a naval base, few children were evacuated from urban centres to Milford Haven. Requisition of the fishing fleet in August 1939 for naval duty meant that the number of trawlers in Milford dropped from 109 in July 1939 to 51 in December of that year.

== The Oil Age ==
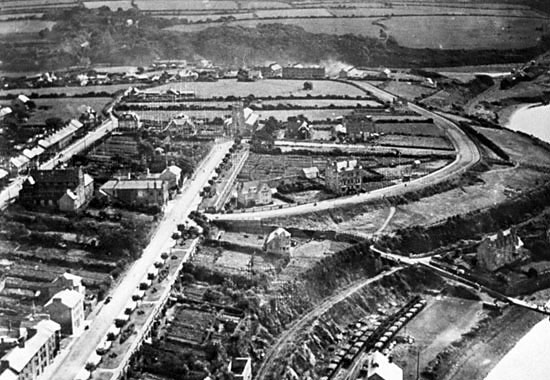
Aerial view of Milford looking west to Pill

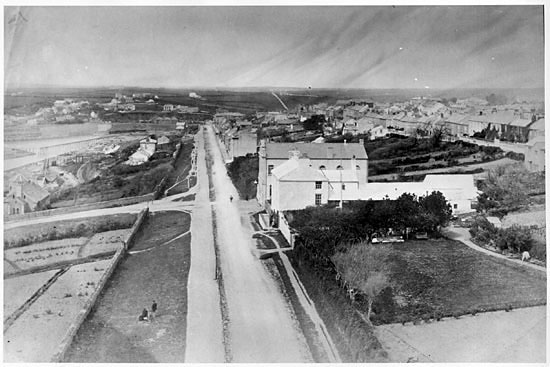
Milford looking east towards Hakin

By the 1950s, the fishing industry was in decline, and unemployment in the area had reached 11%. The government had in fact scheduled it as a 'distressed' area. Over-fishing coupled with national economic factors contributed to a significant decline in the fishing industry, resulting in smaller catches and fewer trawlers. By 1972, only twelve trawlers were registered at the port, and 1974 saw industrial and political action to save jobs related to the industry. There had been a housing boom however in the years following Second World War. The District Council took advantage of recently lifted restrictions, and built over 1,000 new homes to accommodate the rising population. The wide sheltered waterway, cheap land on either side of the Haven and government support contributed to the decision in 1957 to create a major oil port. Legislation was passed, and 1958 saw the establishment of the Milford Haven Conservancy Board. In 1960, the Esso Company completed work on an oil refinery near the town, which opened despite environmental objections. This was followed by similar developments by many other chief oil companies in a 10-year period. BP opened a deep water terminal near Angle, connected to a refinery at Llandarcy by underground pipeline. The site encompasses Popton Fort. In 1964 Texaco completed construction on a refinery a near Rhoscrowther, and 1968 saw the opening of the Gulf Refinery near Waterston. The Amoco Refinery near Roberston Cross was the last to be built, in 1973. All three refineries were linked to the main railway line by branch lines. In 1973, Pembroke Power Station came online, burning fuel from the surrounding refineries. In 1974, Milford could boast an oil trade of 58,554,000 tons, which was three times the combined trade of all the other ports of Wales.

By the early 1980s, the Esso refinery was the 2nd largest in the UK. "The industry however was not labour intensive, and did not provide huge labour opportunities for locals, in the 1970s employing only 2,000 workers." The nature of large construction projects meant that workers were attracted from outside the local area, and the decline of the fishing industry was to a certain extent masked. However, this employment was not permanent. On completing the construction of construction projects such as the Esso refinery and the Cleddau Bridge, those who decided to relocate to the town were faced with what the Preseli District Council called in 1977 "the area's serious unemployment problem". In August 1983, a major boilover fire at the Amoco Refinery required 150 firemen, 50 fire engines and two days to extinguish. In 1984, a serious explosion on a tanker being repaired in the Haven resulted in three fatalities. In 1996 the area hit the headlines internationally when the oil tanker Sea Empress ran aground, causing a substantial oil spill.

== Toponymy ==
Milford Haven is an Anglicisation of an old Scandinavian name Melrfjordr that was first applied to the waterway - the Old Norse Melr, meaning sandbank, and fjordr, meaning inlet, developing into "Milford"; then later the term "Haven" was added. The town was named Milford after the waterway, and, as with the waterway, Haven was added later - in this case around 1868, when the railway terminus was built. The Welsh for Milford Haven, Aberdaugleddau, refers to the estuary which is the meeting point of the "White River Cleddau" (Afon Cleddau Wen) and the "Black River Cleddau" (Afon Cleddau Ddu). The term "Aber" is associated with the 'pouring out' of a river, hence the description of the two rivers meeting and forming an estuary. Cleddau itself may make reference to the action of a weapon or tool cutting through the land. From the 1970s onward, the term "Milffwrd" can be occasionally heard, having even appeared on tourist maps.

== Bibliography ==
- Rees, James Frederick (1954). The Story of Milford. Cardiff: University of Wales Press.
- McKay, Ken (1989). A Vision of Greatness: The History of Milford 1790–1990. Haverfordwest: Brace Harvatt Associates. ISBN 978-0-9515212-0-5.
- Davies, John; Jenkins, Nigel (2008). The Welsh Academy Encyclopaedia of Wales. Cardiff: University of Wales Press. ISBN 978-0-7083-1953-6.
- Richards, Bill (1995). Pembrokeshire Under Fire: The Story Of The Air Raids Of 1940–1. Pembroke Dock: Paterchurch Publications. ISBN 1870745051.
- Warburton, Jack (1994). Milford Haven in Old Picture Postcards. Netherlands: Zaltbommel. ISBN 90-288-2769-2.
- Fowler, John Coke (1868). An Essay on the Advantages of Milford Haven As A Commercial Port of National Importance. Carmarthen: Welshman Office. ISBN 978-1248085561.
- Miles, Dilwyn (1984). Portrait of Pembrokeshire. London: Robert Hale Ltd. ISBN 0-7090-2004-X.
- The Secret Waterway: A Guide to the Milford Haven and Daugleddau Waterway. Haverfordwest: West Wales Maritime Heritage Society, C.I. Thomas Ltd. 1988. ISBN 0-9512846-0-6.
- Thomas, Flora (1950). The Builders of Milford. Haverfordwest.
- Allen, Richard C. (2010). "Nantucket Quakers and the Milford Haven Whaling Industry, C. 1791–1821". Quaker Studies. 15 (1): 6–31. doi:10.3828/quaker.15.1.6.
- George, Barbara J. (1964). "Pembrokeshire sea-trading before 1900" (PDF). Field Studies Journal. 1 (3).
