= Milford Haven =

Town and community in Pembrokeshire, Wales

Coordinates: 51.71418°N 5.04274°W

Milford Haven: Welsh: Aberdaugleddau
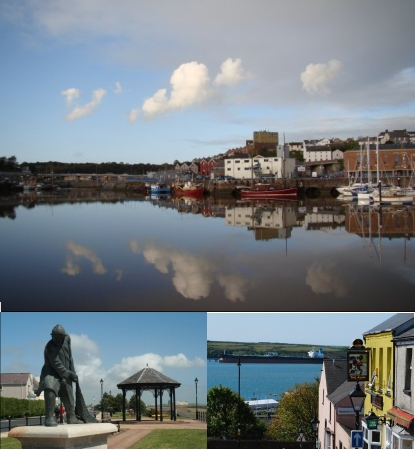
- Clockwise from top: Milford Haven Docks from Hakin; Haven from town; the Tribute to Fishermen on The Rath.

- Location within Pembrokeshire
- Population: 13,907 (Community 2011)
- Demonym: Milfordian
- OS grid reference: SM899061
- Community: Milford Haven
- Principal area: Pembrokeshire
- Preserved county: Dyfed
- Country: Wales
- Sovereign state: United Kingdom
- Post town: MILFORD HAVEN
- Postcode district: SA73
- Dialling code: 01646
- Police: Dyfed-Powys
- Fire: Mid and West Wales
- Ambulance: Welsh
- UK Parliament: Mid and South Pembrokeshire
- Senedd Cymru – Welsh Parliament: Ceredigion Penfro

Milford Haven (Welsh: Aberdaugleddau, lit. 'mouth of the two rivers Cleddau') is a town and community in Pembrokeshire, Wales. It is on the north side of the Milford Haven Waterway, an estuary forming a natural harbour that has been used as a port since the Middle Ages.

The town was founded in 1790 by Sir William Hamilton, who designed a grid street pattern. He intended it to be a whaling centre, but by 1800 it was developing as a Royal Navy dockyard which it remained until the dockyard was transferred to Pembroke in 1814. It then became a commercial dock, with the focus moving in the 1960s, after the construction of an oil refinery built by Esso, to logistics for fuel oil and liquid gas. By 2010, the town's port had become the fourth largest in the United Kingdom in terms of tonnage, and continues its important role in the United Kingdom's energy sector with several oil refineries and one of the biggest liquefied natural gas terminals in the world.

Milford Haven is the most populous community in the county, with a population of 13,907 within the community boundary at the 2011 census. When measured in terms of urban area the population was 13,582, making it the second largest urban area in the county after Haverfordwest (where the urban area extends beyond its community boundary).

The natural harbour of the Haven was known as a safe port and was exploited for several historical military operations throughout the second millennium. Campaigns conducted from the Haven included part of the invasion of Ireland in 1171 by Henry II and by Cromwell in 1649. Forces which have disembarked at the point include Jean II de Rieux's 1405 reinforcement of the Glyndŵr Rising. In 1485, the future Henry VII landed close to his birthplace in Mill Bay before marching on to England.

== History ==
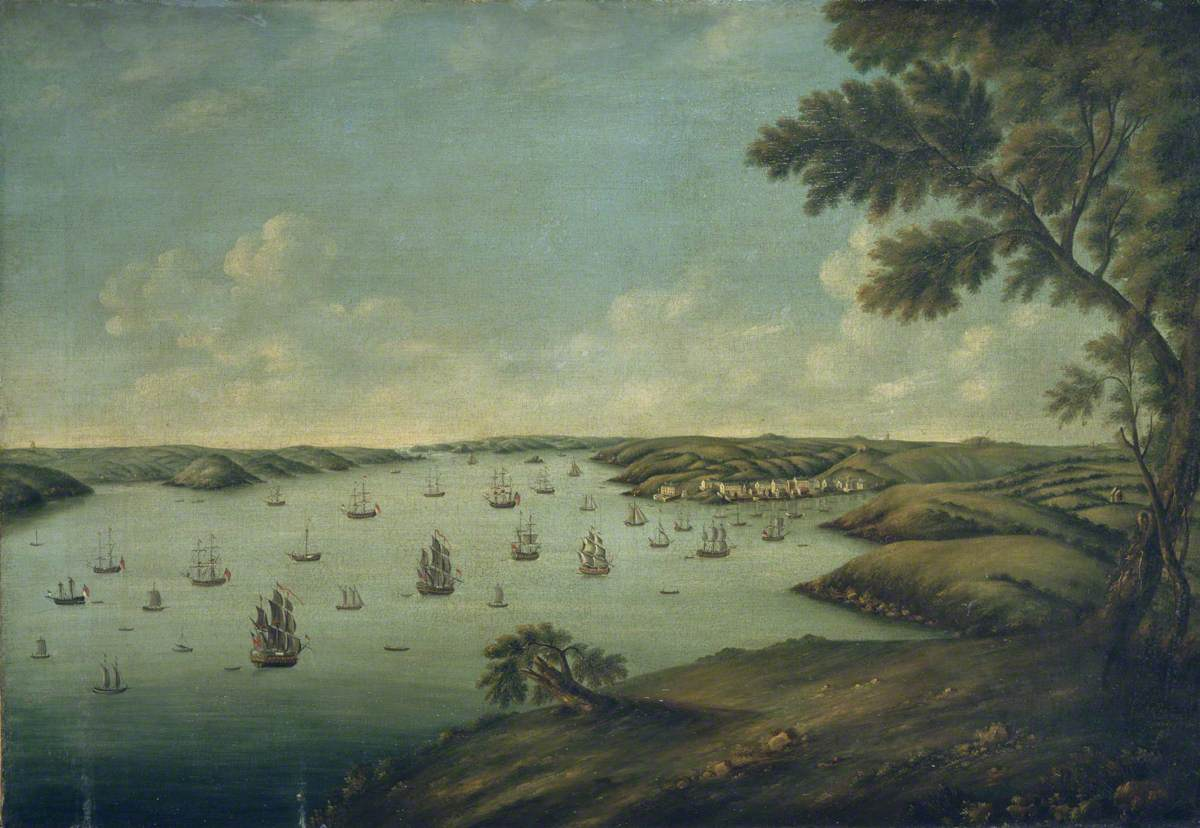
Milford Haven by Attwood, looking west, 1776

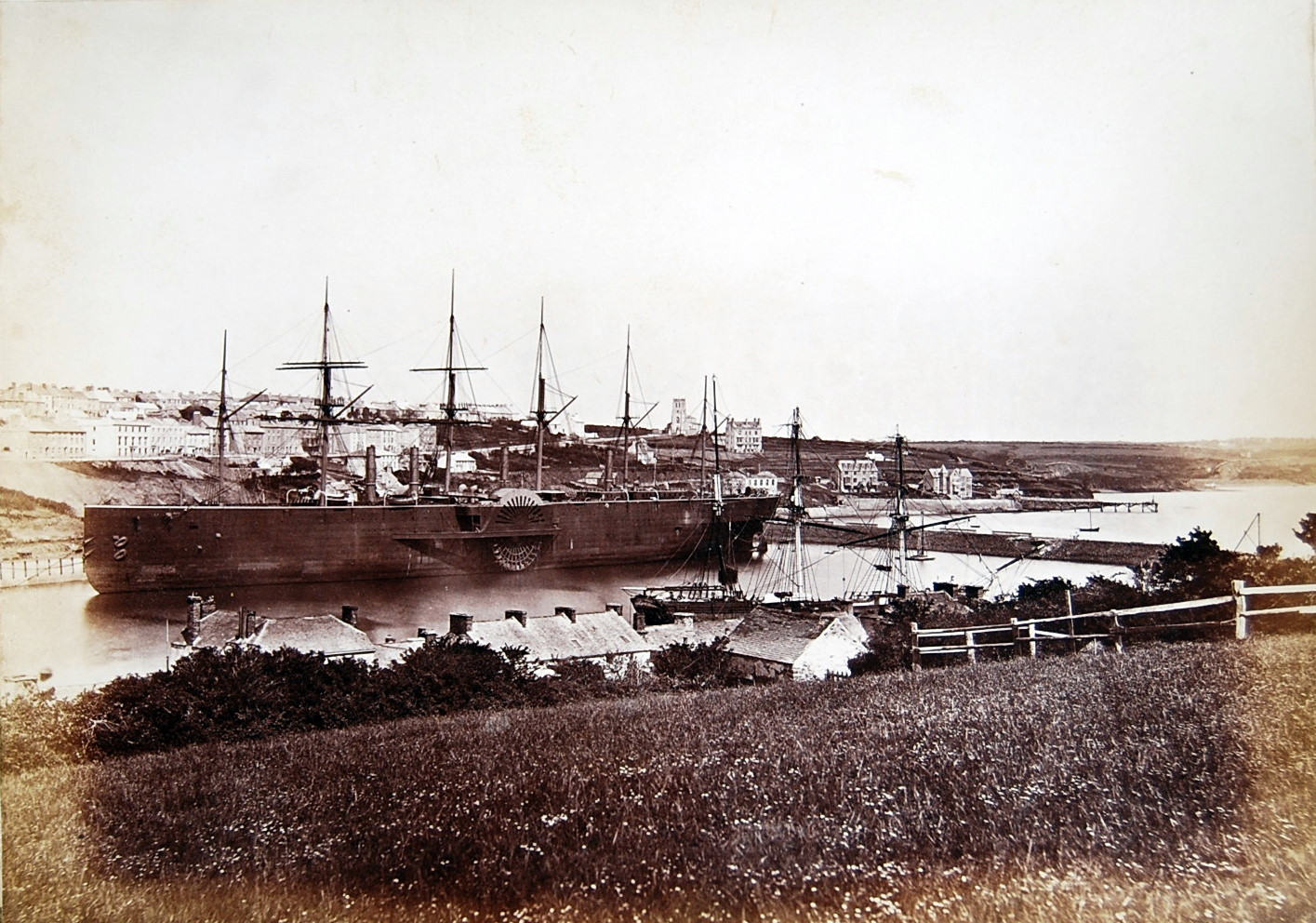
SS Great Eastern in Milford Haven in the 1870s

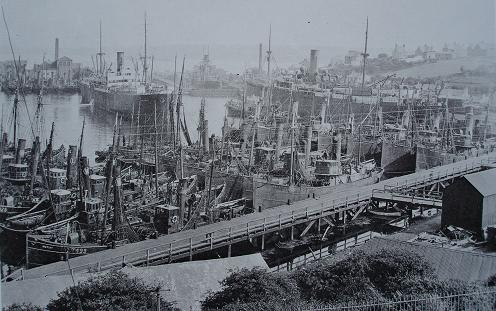
Fishing fleet laid up in Milford docks in the coal miners' strike, along with troopships for transporting soldiers to Ireland, 1921

The town of Milford was founded in 1793, after Sir William Hamilton obtained an act of Parliament, the Hubberston and Pill, Pembroke, Docks and Piers Act 1790 (30 Geo. 3. c. 55), to establish the port at Milford, and takes its name from the natural harbour of Milford Haven, which was used for several hundred years as a staging point on sea journeys to Ireland and as a shelter by Vikings. It was known as a safe port and is mentioned in Shakespeare's Cymbeline as "blessed Milford". It was used as the base for several military operations, such as Richard de Clare's invasion of Leinster in 1167, Henry II's Invasion of Ireland in 1171, John's continued subjugation of the Irish in 1185 and 1210 and Oliver Cromwell's 1649 invasion of Ireland; while forces which have disembarked at the point include Jean II de Rieux's 1405 reinforcement of the Glyndŵr Rising and Henry VII's 1485 landing at the waterway before marching on England. By the late 18th century the two local creeks were being used to load and unload goods, and surrounding settlements were established, including the medieval chapel, and Summer Hill Farm, the only man-made structures on the future site of Milford.

Sir William Hamilton, the town's founder, had acquired the land from his wife, Catherine Barlow of Slebech. His nephew, the Hon. Charles Francis Greville, invited seven Quaker families from Nantucket and Martha's Vineyard to settle in the new town and develop a whaling fleet. They began by building a shipyard, and leased it to a Messrs. Harry and Joseph Jacob. In December 1796, in an unusual arrangement, the Admiralty (Navy operations) directed the Navy Board (administration and supplies) to contract Jacobs shipyard to build a frigate and later a 74-gun ship-of-the-line. However, due to a combined lack of local standing oak, access to supplies of timber from the Baltic, and local skills in volume, the Jacob operation soon went bankrupt.

In 1800, following the bankruptcy of the Jacobs & Sons, the Navy Board's overseer, Jean-Louis Barralier, was persuaded to lease the site for the Navy Board and develop a dockyard for building warships. Seven royal vessels were eventually launched from the dockyard, including HMS Surprise and HMS Milford. The town was built on a grid pattern, thought to have been to the design of Jean-Louis Barrallier, who remained in charge of shipbuilding there for the Navy Board. Between 1801 and 1803, the town and waterway were protected by temporary batteries at Hakin Point and south of St Katherine's Church, in response to the perceived threat following the Fishguard Invasion.

A church was consecrated in October 1808 and dedicated to St Catherine of Alexandria in the underdeveloped eastern side of the town, it remained a chapel of ease until 1891 when Milford became a parish, until that time competing with St Peter and St Cewydd in Steynton. By the start of the 19th century, a mail coach was operating between London and Hubberston, and in 1800 the short lived Milford and Pembrokeshire Bank was established by Thomas Phillips, operating from a branch in the town. It collapsed in 1810.

On 11 October 1809, a naval commission recommended purchase of the Milford Haven facility and formal establishment of a Royal Navy dockyard. This was, according to the report, due to the fact that Millford built-ships had proved to be cheaper due to the cheap cost of supplies and abundant labour supply. It proposed purchase of the yard at £4,455. However, as this was after the Battle of Trafalgar (21 October 1805), when the need for naval ships was decreasing in the Napoleonic Wars, and in such a remote location, the proposal seemed perplexing. However, in light of the end of the Franco-Spanish naval engagement, and the merging of the two sides of the Royal Navy under the Admiralty Board, the fact that Frenchman Barallier would remain in charge strongly suggests to historians that the Royal Navy accepted that its ships manoeuvrability was inferior to those of the Franco-Spanish alliance. In an effort to rectify this state of affairs the Royal Navy's first School of Naval Architecture was opened in Portsmouth in 1810. Effectively then, Millford was to be set up as a model dockyard under French management, from which lessons could be learnt for implementation in other dockyards.

In 1814 the Royal Dockyard was transferred to Pembroke Dock; though, when Robert Fulke Greville inherited the estate in 1824, a commercial dock was started which became the home of a successful fishing industry. By 1849, the district of Hakin was described as a considerable centre of boat building, and by 1906, Milford had become the sixth largest fishing port in the UK, and its population rose. The Pembrokeshire Herald claimed in 1912 that "the fish trade is Milford's sole industry ... the population of the town has doubled by means of it".

In 1863, the railway came to Milford, linking it to the Haverfordwest line and beyond. In 1866, work was completed on an additional extension which provided access to the docks and ship-breaking yard on the eastern side of the town. Between 1875 and 1886, SS Great Eastern was a permanent fixture at Milford Docks, remaining there for lengthy repairs. Her arrival into the docks was heralded as an example of the size of ship that the town could expect to attract.

In the late 1850s, work began on a network of forts on both sides of the Milford Haven estuary, as a direct result of the Royal Commission on the Defence of the United Kingdom. They were designed with the intention of defending the United Kingdom against French invasion, although were never used for this purpose. Notable examples in the town were Fort Hubberstone in Gelliswick and Scoveston Fort to the north east of the town.

By 1901, the town's population had reached 5,102, and by 1931 had further doubled to 10,104. In the First World War, the Haven was an assembly point for convoys to Gibraltar, and a base, under the command of R.N.R. Captain (and retired Admiral) Charles Holcombe Dare, to counter the activity of German U-boats off the coast of Pembrokeshire. The early twentieth century saw a period of increased urbanisation of the area; in the period from the First World War to 1937, 312 council houses were built, and public services, such as electricity supplies and sewerage, were completed. The steep gradient of the Rath was at this time constructed, and in 1939 Milford Haven Town Hall was opened on Hamilton Terrace, at that time possessing an inbuilt fire station. 1939 also saw the opening of an outdoor swimming pool on the Rath.

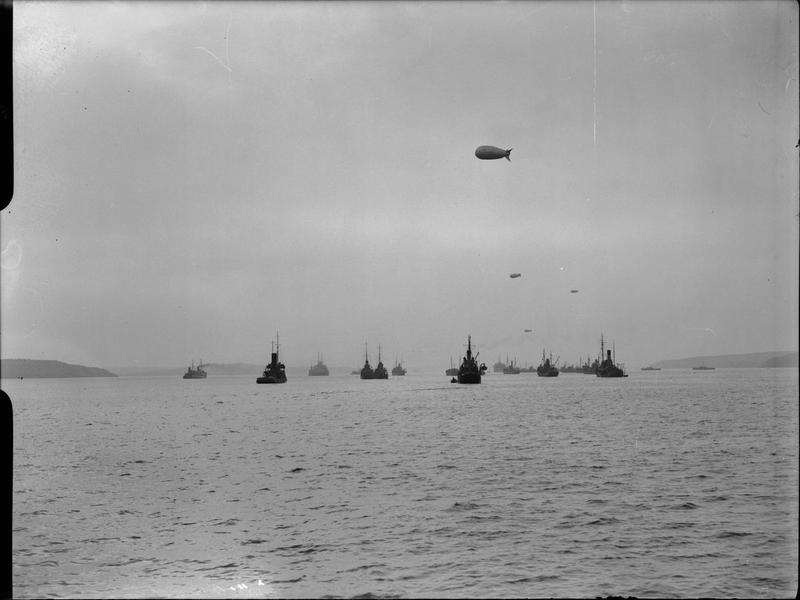
A British convoy, with balloon protection, leaving the port of Milford Haven in the Second World War.

In the Second World War Milford Haven was chosen as a base for allied American troops, and roughly 1,000 American military personnel were housed in the town at this time. They manned an amphibious base which included a hospital built in Hakin and a docks complex at Newton Noyes. The base had a complement of 71 officers and 902 enlisted men, and played a rôle in preparations for D Day. Despite its strategic importance as the home of a large fish market, a mines depot, a flax factory, and housing numerous military personnel, Milford escaped serious damage by German bombing in the Second World War. In the summer of 1941 a bomb fell in fields near Priory Road, and later that year, a bomb damaged a house in Brooke Avenue. In neither instance were there casualties.

In 1960, the Esso Company completed work on an oil refinery near the town, which opened despite environmental objections. This was followed by similar developments by many other chief oil companies in a 10-year period, including Texaco, Amoco, Gulf and BP. In 1974, Milford could boast an oil trade of 58,554,000 tons, which was three times the combined trade of all the other ports of Wales. In 1996 the area hit the headlines internationally when the oil tanker Sea Empress ran aground, causing a substantial oil spill. By the early 1980s, the Esso refinery was the second largest in the UK.

=== Toponymy ===
Milford Haven is an Anglicization of an old Scandinavian name "Melrfjordr" that was first applied to the waterway – the Old Norse Melr, meaning sandbank, and fjordr, meaning fjord or inlet, developing into "Milford"; then later the term "Haven" from the Germanic word Haven for port or harbour was added. The town was named Milford after the waterway, and Haven was added later in around 1868 when the railway terminus was built. The Welsh for Milford Haven, "Aberdaugleddau", refers to the estuary which is the meeting point of the "White River Cleddau" (Afon Cleddau Wen) and the "Black River Cleddau" (Afon Cleddau Ddu).

In Welsh, the term Aber is the "pouring out" of a river, hence the description of the confluence of the two rivers and their forming an estuary. Also, Cleddau may make reference to the action of a weapon or tool cutting through the land.

== Geography and climate ==
Milford Haven

Climate chart (precipitation, max. and min. temperature)
J	F	M	A	M	J	J	A	S	O	N	D
109 8 4	75 8 4	80 10 5	65 12 6	65 15 9	64 17 11	70 19 13	84 19 13	86 17 12	130 14 9	130 11 7	118 9 5
- █ Average max. and min. temperatures in °C
- █ Precipitation totals in mm
- Source: [Met Office]
Imperial conversion
J	F	M	A	M	J	J	A	S	O	N	D
4.3 47 39	3 47 38	3.1 50 41	2.6 54 43	2.5 59 47	2.5 63 52	2.7 66 55	3.3 66 56	3.4 63 53	5.1 58 49	5.1 52 44	4.6 48 40
- █ Average max. and min. temperatures in °F
- █ Precipitation totals in inches

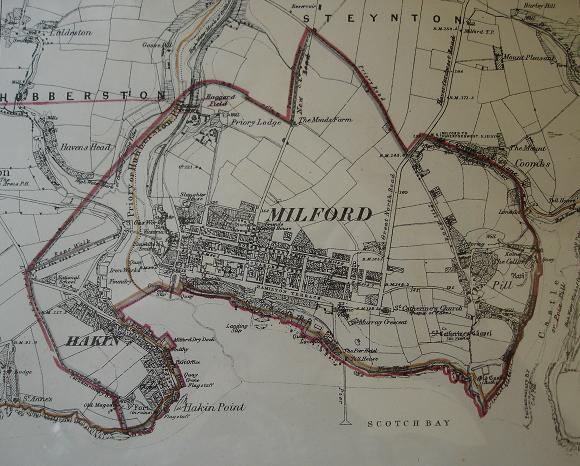
Street plan of Milford Haven, 1868

The town of Milford Haven lies on the north bank of the Milford Haven Waterway, which is a ria or drowned valley. This is a landscape of low-lying wooded shorelines, creeks and mudflats.

There has been a great deal of loss and degradation of local mudflat habitat as a result of industrial and commercial development – one study indicated a 45 per cent loss in Hubberston Pill.

The town has an historic late 18th and 19th centuries core based, on a grid street pattern, between Hubberston Pill and Castle Pill, and extending inland for 500 metres (1,600 ft). Milford Haven's 20th century expansion absorbed several other settlements. Hakin and Hubberston are older, and situated to the west of the main town. Steynton is a medieval village to the north, no longer separated due to the expansion of houses. Lower Priory, with the remains of a very early religious Priory, is in a natural valley near the village of Thornton.

Milford Haven enjoys a mild climate. Its proximity to the coast contributes to wet winters, but it enjoys more sunshine than most of the UK with around 1,600 hours of sunshine a year. This is comparable to much of Southern England. The nearest official Met Office weather station is at Milford Haven Conservancy Board.

Climate data for Milford Haven Conservancy Board (1991–2020 normals, extremes 1964-present)
Month	Jan	Feb	Mar	Apr	May	Jun	Jul	Aug	Sep	Oct	Nov	Dec	Year
Record high °C (°F)	14.0 (57.2)	14.5 (58.1)	18.8 (65.8)	22.4 (72.3)	28.5 (83.3)	32.2 (90.0)	30.0 (86.0)	30.8 (87.4)	27.2 (81.0)	21.2 (70.2)	17.0 (62.6)	14.5 (58.1)	32.2 (90.0)
Mean daily maximum °C (°F)	8.7 (47.7)	8.8 (47.8)	10.2 (50.4)	12.6 (54.7)	15.3 (59.5)	17.5 (63.5)	19.3 (66.7)	19.2 (66.6)	17.5 (63.5)	14.5 (58.1)	11.5 (52.7)	9.4 (48.9)	13.7 (56.7)
Daily mean °C (°F)	6.5 (43.7)	6.4 (43.5)	7.5 (45.5)	9.5 (49.1)	12.0 (53.6)	14.4 (57.9)	16.2 (61.2)	16.2 (61.2)	14.7 (58.5)	12.1 (53.8)	9.3 (48.7)	7.3 (45.1)	11.0 (51.8)
Mean daily minimum °C (°F)	4.4 (39.9)	4.1 (39.4)	4.9 (40.8)	6.4 (43.5)	8.7 (47.7)	11.2 (52.2)	13.1 (55.6)	13.3 (55.9)	11.8 (53.2)	9.6 (49.3)	7.1 (44.8)	5.1 (41.2)	8.3 (46.9)
Record low °C (°F)	−9.2 (15.4)	−8.0 (17.6)	−6.7 (19.9)	−1.7 (28.9)	0.3 (32.5)	4.5 (40.1)	6.9 (44.4)	5.5 (41.9)	4.1 (39.4)	−0.4 (31.3)	−4.3 (24.3)	−5.0 (23.0)	−9.2 (15.4)
Average precipitation mm (inches)	108.8 (4.28)	81.5 (3.21)	74.6 (2.94)	64.5 (2.54)	62.7 (2.47)	66.6 (2.62)	71.2 (2.80)	90.5 (3.56)	80.9 (3.19)	118.9 (4.68)	136.7 (5.38)	123.9 (4.88)	1,080.9 (42.56)
Average precipitation days (≥ 1.0 mm)	15.9	12.9	12.2	10.9	9.3	9.9	10.3	11.8	11.7	15.2	18.1	16.9	154.9
Mean monthly sunshine hours	58.9	84.7	122.3	189.4	220.7	202.1	200.1	188.9	147.8	108.5	60.2	50.1	1,633.6
Source 1: Met Office
Source 2: Starlings Roost Weather

== Governance ==
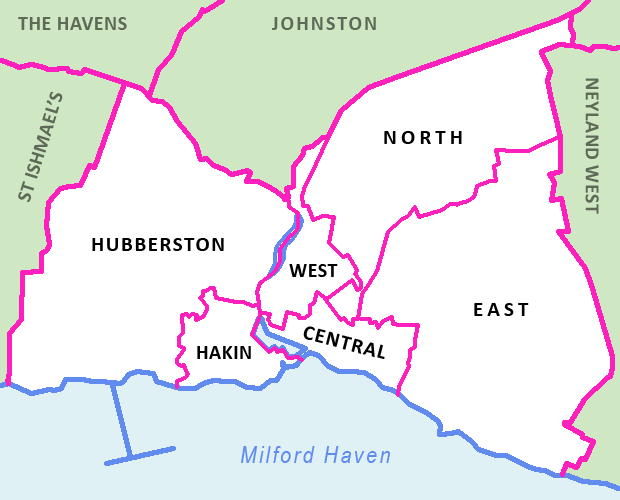
Wards of Milford Haven

=== Local government ===
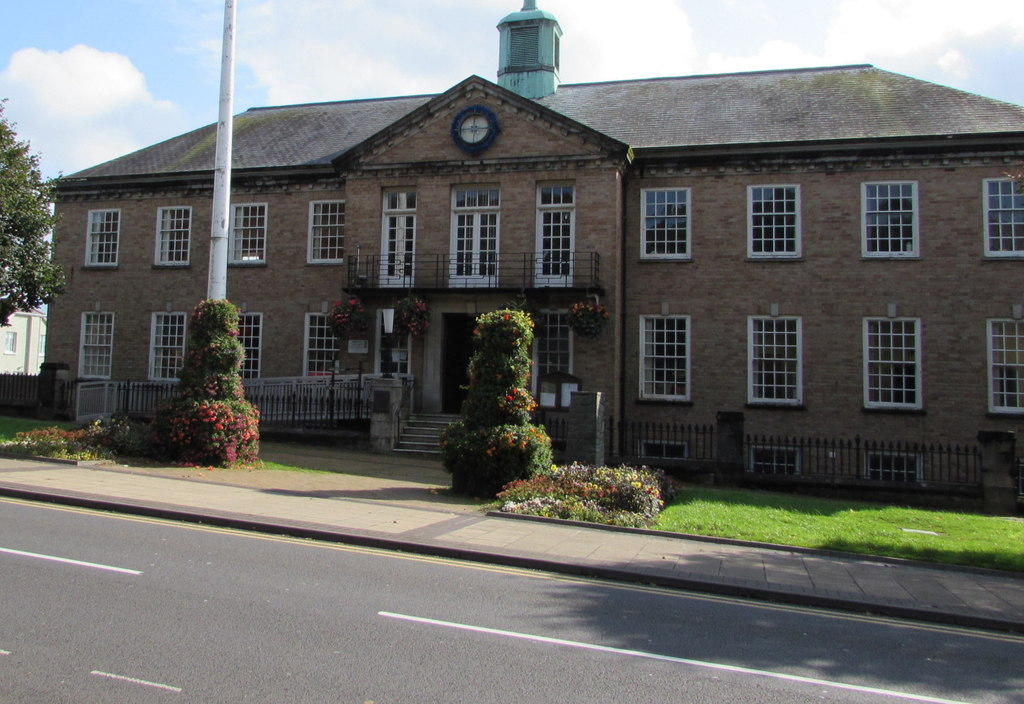
Milford Haven Town Hall

There are two tiers of local government covering Milford Haven, at community (town) and county level: Milford Haven Town Council and Pembrokeshire County Council. Milford Haven Town Council is based at Cemetery Lodge on Thornton Road, Milford Haven.

Map of the community (orange) in Pembrokeshire

The community of Milford Haven covers an area of 1,573 hectares (6.07 sq mi) and includes the Milford Central, East, Hakin, Hubberston, North and West wards. The community has its own town council.

The six wards comprising Milford Haven community each elect one councillor to Pembrokeshire County Council.

=== Senedd and Westminster representation ===
Milford Haven is part of the Preseli Pembrokeshire Senedd constituency and Mid and South Pembrokeshire UK Parliamentary constituency. The local Member of the Senedd is Paul Davies of the Conservative Party and the local Member of Parliament is Henry Tufnell of the Labour Party.

=== Administrative history ===
When development of the modern town began in the 1790s the area straddled the parishes of Steynton and Hubberston. The Milford Improvement Act 1857 (20 & 21 Vict. c. lxxiv) appointed improvement commissioners to run the town. Under the Local Government Act 1894 the improvement commissioners' district became an urban district in December 1894, with an elected council. The act also specified that parishes could not straddle district boundaries, and so the part of the urban district in Steynton parish became a parish called Milford, and the part in Hubberston parish became a parish called Hakin. Milford and Hakin were urban parishes and so did not have parish councils of their own; the lowest level representative body was the Milford Haven Urban District Council. The urban district council built the Town Hall on Hamilton Terrace in 1939 to serve as its headquarters. Milford Haven Urban District was abolished in 1974, becoming part of Preseli (renamed Preseli Pembrokeshire in 1987) within the county of Dyfed. A community covering the former urban district was established at the same time, with its council taking the name Milford Haven Town Council. Preseli Pembrokeshire was abolished in 1996 and the area became part of a re-established Pembrokeshire.

== Economy ==
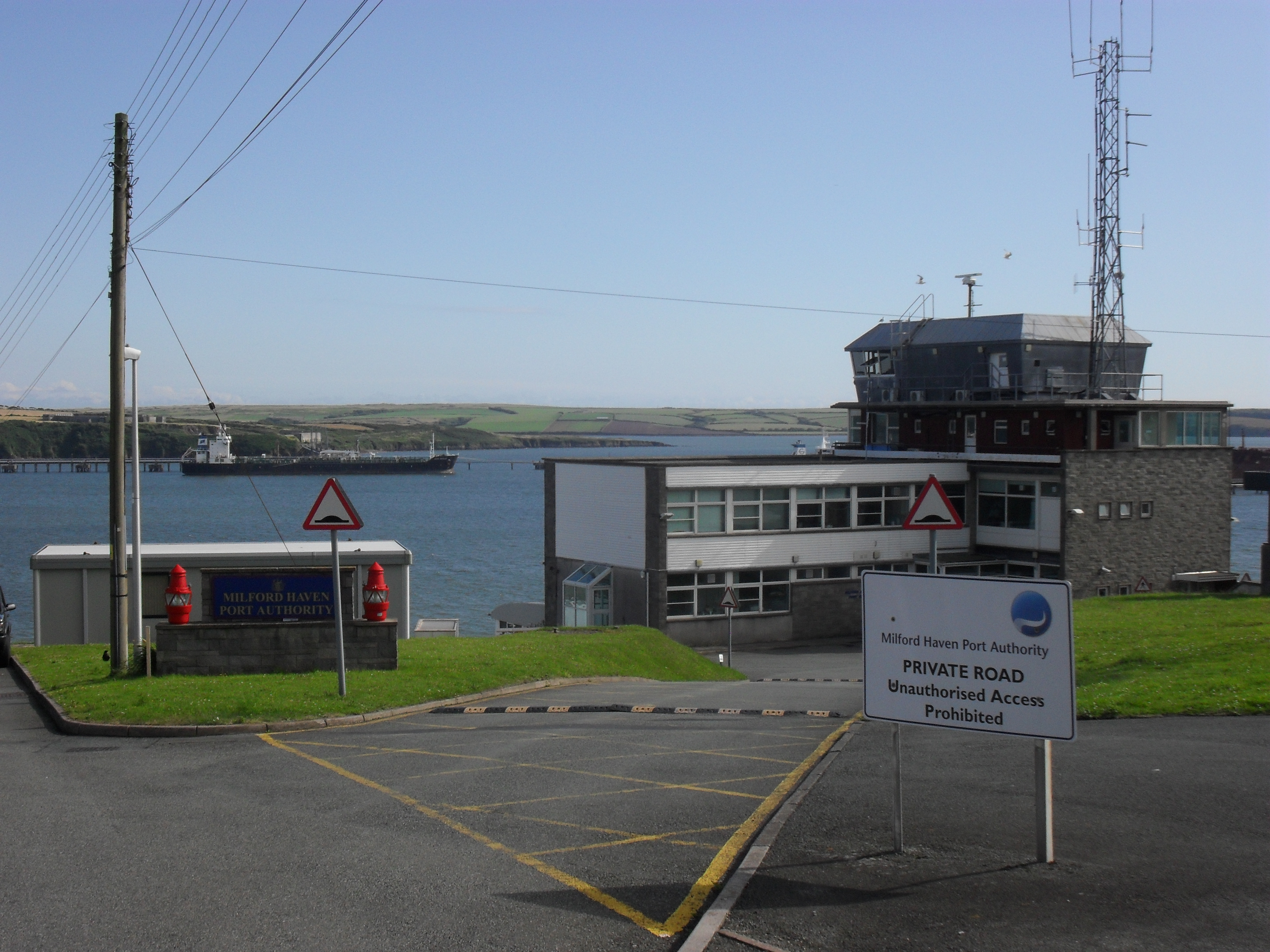
Milford Haven Port Authority

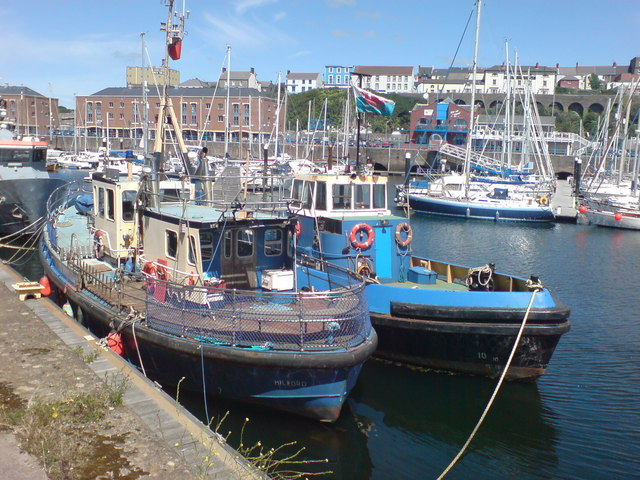
Working tug boats in Milford docks

Milford Haven has experienced a history of boom and slump in shipbuilding, fishing, as a railhead and an ocean terminal. At the height of the fishing boom, it was said that "every day was a pay day". In 1921, 674 people were identified as working in the fishing industry, the leading occupation in the town, followed by transport and communication with 600 employees. However, at peak times, more than 200 trawlers and 2,000 people were required to service the fishing industry. The development of the oil industry also helped to boost the town's fortunes. However, the slumps have been just as severe, the area being scheduled as 'distressed' in the inter-war period. Over-fishing coupled with national economic factors contributed to a significant decline in the fishing industry, resulting in smaller catches and fewer trawlers. By 1972, only twelve trawlers were registered at the port, and 1974 saw industrial and political action to save jobs related to the industry.

In the 1980s and 1990s, unemployment at times topped 30%, and the major industry of oil refining created no more than 2,000 direct or indirect jobs. Into the new millennium, its fortunes have risen, as can be witnessed in the activity surrounding the LNG terminal, and the new building works which accompanied it and its connection to the controversial South Wales Gas Pipeline. In February 2003, Pembrokeshire Council granted outline planning permission to Petroplus for an LNG storage depot at Waterston, and in March 2004, an additional site was approved at South Hook for ExxonMobil.

International tourism has also increased, with the arrival of transatlantic liners and the revenue they introduce to the town. 2012 saw 3,000 cruise passengers from six cruise vessels disembark at Milford, and the Port Authority expected 5,000 in 2013. The waterway transports 25% of Britain's requirement for motor fuel, and the port handled 53 million tonnes of shipping in 2008, making it the largest port in Wales, and the sixth largest in the UK. There are two major commercial centres: Charles Street in the historic town centre, and the Havens Head Retail Park at the foot of the docks area. In 2012, it was announced that the Milford waterway was declared an Enterprise Zone by the coalition government, due to its importance to the energy sector. In 2014, plans by Milford Haven Port Authority were unveiled, which propose a transformation of the docks area into a residential and commercial destination, including hotel accommodation. In 2017 Milford Haven Port Authority launched Milford Waterway, which included a re-branding of the marina and aims to encourage hotel, commercial and leisure developments to the area. In November 2014 it was announced that Milford Haven Refinery, a major employer in the area, would be converted into a 'storage and distribution facility' with a loss of over 300 jobs.

Fishing industry in Milford Haven (1890–2017)
Year	1890	1900	1910	1920	1939	1946	1950	1960	1970	1980	1990	2000	2010	2017
Catch (tonnes)	9,500	22,500	38,000	46,000	43,000	59,000	35,000	12,000	4,000	2,000	2,500	3,450	2,900	3,000
Fleet	12	65	64	62	109	n/a	97	27	n/a	5	7	n/a	n/a	2
Fishermen	n/a	520	n/a	n/a	1,200	n/a	1,000	271	n/a	35	88	n/a	n/a	n/a

Source: Bluestone Wales, Milford Fish Docks, National Statistics Sea Fisheries Annual Reports and McKay.

=== Tourism ===
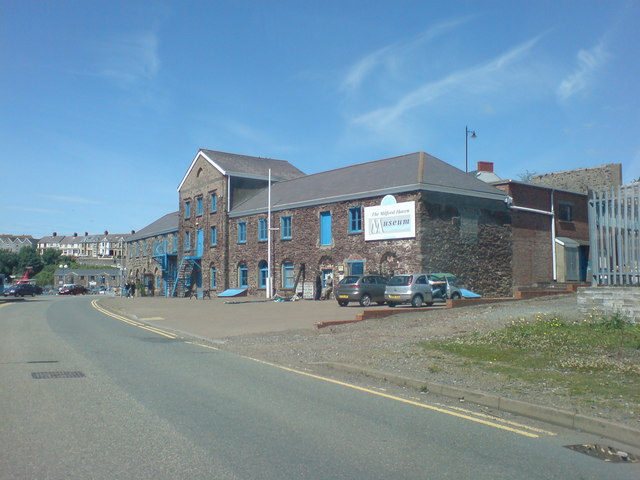
Milford Haven Museum, in the Custom House built in 1797 by Jernigan

Post-war Milford Haven was not considered a promising location for tourism. A 1964 study commissioned by the district council highlighted the lack of nearby beaches, proximity of the town to heavy industrialization, and a shortage of tourist facilities such as restaurants and hotels. However, in the 1980s, a series of steps to beautify certain parts of the town commenced. The outdoor swimming pool, which had remained disused for some years, was transformed into a water-garden and officially opened in 1990 by Margaret Thatcher.

In 1991, the Tall Ships Race started from Milford, and this coincided with an overhaul of the docks. Subsequently, it was rebranded as a marina, and a number of attractions including cafes, restaurants and retail outlets sprung up. A tourist information centre is near the retail park and the local museum, in the old custom house, focuses on the maritime history of the area.

== Transport ==
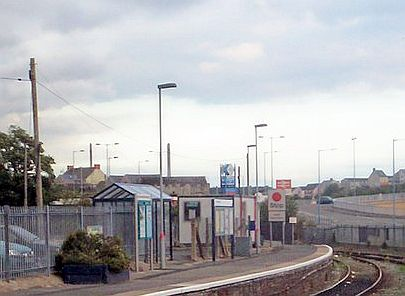
Milford Haven Railway Station

The first railway to Milford Haven was with the completion of the South Wales Railway in 1856. Brunel had a vision of connecting London to New York via a railway through Wales and then to a commuter port. The initial plan was to terminate the line at Fishguard and to create a ferry service to Ireland, but after a failure to complete Irish rail links the terminus was changed to New Milford, (Neyland), which was completed in April 1856. The first rail link direct to Milford Haven was completed in 1863, which was originally conceived as a plan to create an impressive Milford to Manchester railway. The trains using the line were operated by Great Western Railway who had part funded the original railway.

Milford Haven railway station, the terminus of the West Wales Line, and the trains serving it, are operated by Transport for Wales Rail. Trains depart every two hours to Manchester Piccadilly via Carmarthen, Swansea and Cardiff Central.

The main road to and from Milford Haven is the A4076. At Johnston the junction with the A477 connects with Pembroke Dock and at Haverfordwest with the A40.The route to Hakin and the western side of the town is along the A4076 via Victoria Bridge over the docks.

Bus routes passing through the town are operated by independent companies and Pembrokeshire County Council subsidies. Services include a town circular, Haverfordwest and Pembroke Dock.

== Demography ==
Population growth in Milford Haven since 1841
Year	1841	1851	1861	1871	1881	1891	1901	1911	1921	1931	1951	1961	1971	2001	2011	2021
Population	2,377	2,837	3,007	2,836	3,812	4,070	5,102	6,399	7,772	10,104	11,710	12,802	13,760	13,096	13,907	14,798
Source: Vision of Britain & Field Studies Journal

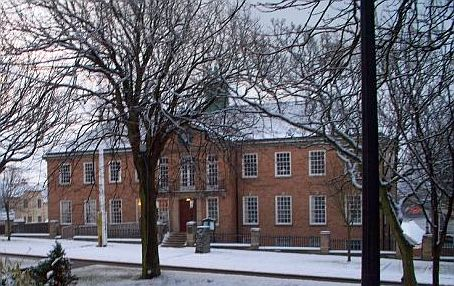
Milford Haven Town Hall in winter

By the 1950s, the fishing industry was in decline, and unemployment in the area had reached 11 per cent. There had been a housing boom however in the years following Second World War. The District Council took advantage of recently lifted restrictions, and built over 1,000 new homes to house the rising population. "A new wave of hope however arrived with the prospect of a booming oil industry. The industry however was not labour-intensive, and did not provide huge labour opportunities for locals, in the 1970s employing only 2,000 workers." The nature of large construction projects meant that workers were attracted from outside the local area, and the decline of the fishing industry was to a certain extent masked. However, this employment was not permanent. On completing the construction of construction projects such as the Esso refinery and the Cleddau Bridge, those who decided to relocate to the town were faced with what the Preseli District Council called in 1977 "the area's serious unemployment problem".

Milford Haven is not ethnically diverse, with 96.4 per cent of people identifying themselves as white, compared with 99.2 per cent in 2001. 92.9 per cent of people in Milford Central ward were born in the UK, and only 3.8 per cent of residents arrived later than 2001. 96.3 per cent of residents claim English as their first language. 1.5 per cent of residents identify as having religious views other than any denomination of Christianity, including no religion.

=== Welsh language ===
Milford Haven is in a geographical and historic area known as Little England Beyond Wales, which has predominately used English for many centuries. Although it is the most westerly point of the country and the part of the county furthest from the English border, a relatively small proportion of the community knows the Welsh language. In the 2011 census, only 7.5 per cent of residents in the Milford Central ward claimed that they could speak, read and write the language, in contrast to the Pembrokeshire county as a whole where roughly 18 per cent of the population are able to read, write and speak Welsh, while in the neighbouring county of Carmarthenshire around 40 per cent of people express a similar level of fluency in Welsh. Local disconnection from the Welsh language was highlighted in November 2008, when Milford Haven Town Council unsuccessfully demanded the right to opt out of a scheme in which official documents had to be translated into Welsh if requested; the council was allegedly one of about 10 that opposed having to make such translations.

== Architecture ==
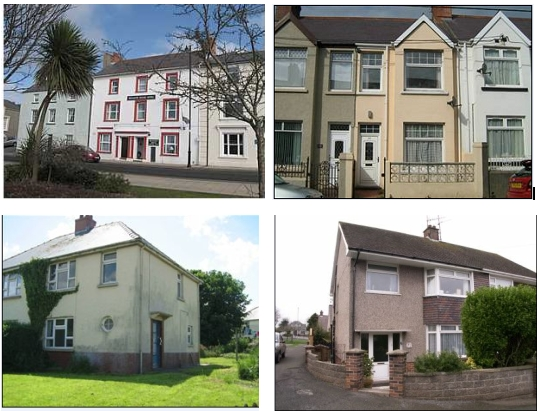
Architecture in Milford Haven, 1: Georgian town house, 2: Terrace house from 19th century, 3: Council house from 1930s, 4: Private house built 1960s

Architecture in Milford Haven can be divided into roughly three broad periods of building. The number of buildings which pre-date the town's official foundation in 1790 are scarce. These include the medieval priory, and a 12th-century 'beacon chapel'.

The initial phase of building from the late 18th century is in the area central to the town, the three parallel streets of Hamilton Terrace, Charles Street And Robert Street. Three-storey Georgian domestic and commercial properties are set along the northern side of the main road through the town, and overlook the harbour and waterway.

By the late 19th century, the land directly above this central area was being developed. To house the growing population, rows of terrace houses were built, which slowly encompassed the area north up to Marble Hall Road, and east to Pill, examples including Shakespeare Avenue and Starbuck Road. The Great North Road took a northerly route which sliced this new district in two. Suburban owner-occupied detached and semi-detached properties grew up on land overlooking the waterway and along the course of Steynton Road. Around the start of the 20th century, there was a recognized need to provide accommodation to poorer families. As a result, much former agricultural land was bought, and new council housing was built. These were frequently in large estates of houses, such as Howarth Close, Haven Drive and The Glebelands Estate. They transformed previously rural areas into an urban landscape, and considerably increased Milford's area of housing. Council estates were built throughout the 20th century, one of the most recent and largest examples being The Mount Estate, which has been the scene of a number of anti-social incidents.

== Landmarks ==
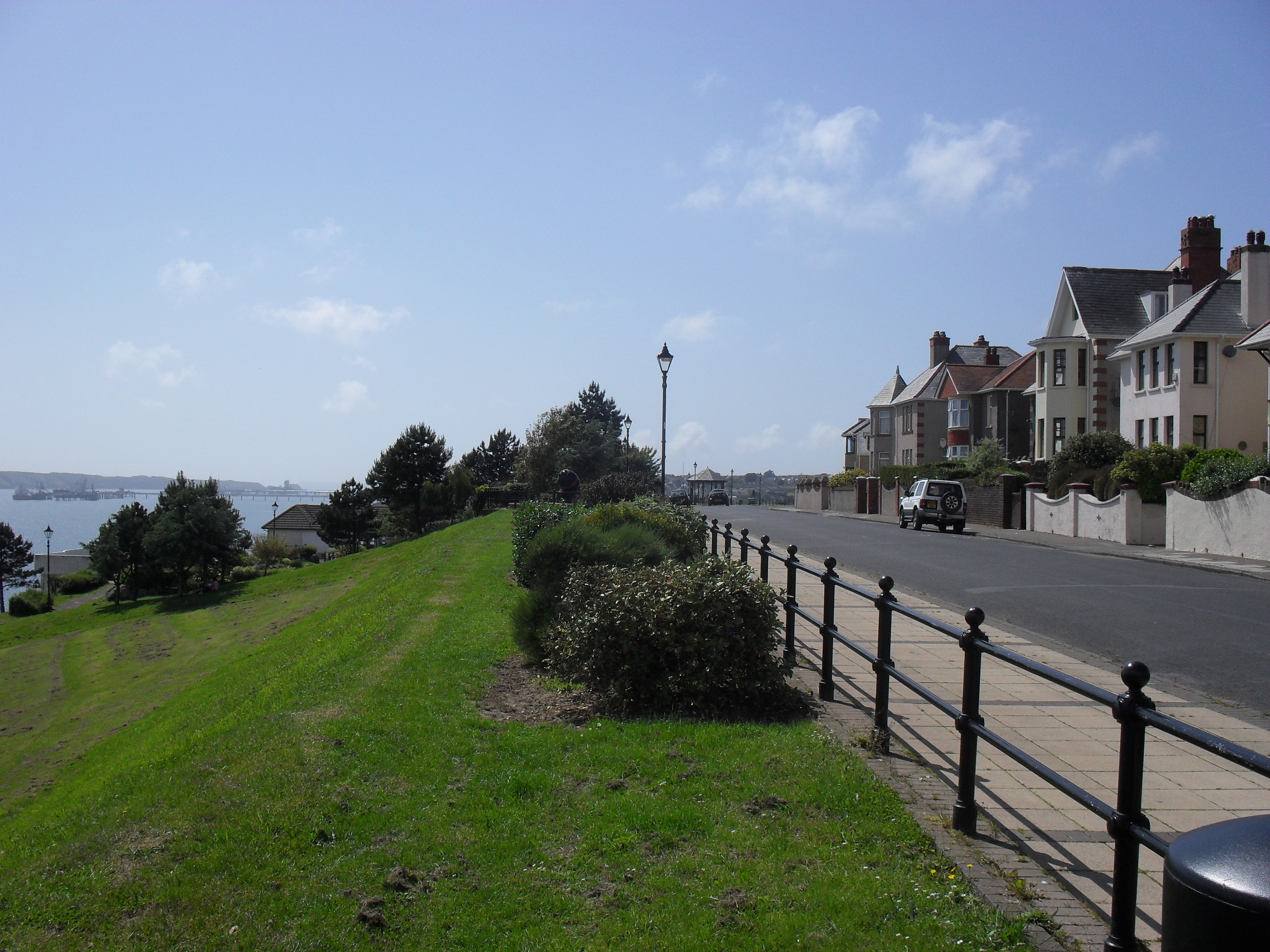
The Rath and view of the Haven estuary

The attractions in the town include Fort Hubberstone, built in 1863 to defend the Haven as part of the recommendations of the Royal Commission on the Defence of the United Kingdom. It is in a prominent position in Gelliswick bay, west of the town, overlooking the Haven. Formerly owned by Milford Haven Port Authority, the fort is not currently open to the public, and has been the scene of non-fatal injuries to trespassers. In 2011 it was named as the fifth most endangered archaeological site in the UK by British Archaeology magazine. The ruins of an observatory, originally intended to be part of "The College of King George the Third founded at Milford", is in Hakin. Construction of the building was abandoned in 1809. Milford Haven Museum, is sited centrally in the docks area, in the town's oldest building, the Custom House, which was built in 1797. Designed by Swansea architect, Jernigan, it was built to store whale oil awaiting shipment for sale in London.

The Rath is a landscaped street on high ground, with panoramic views of the Haven. The land was used in the 18th century as a gun battery, and its eastern edge was the site of the Royalist fort constructed by Charles I known as Pill Fort. In the 1930s it became the home of an outdoor swimming pool, which was converted into a water gardens in 1990. Milford Haven Waterway forms a large natural harbour.

== Culture and community ==
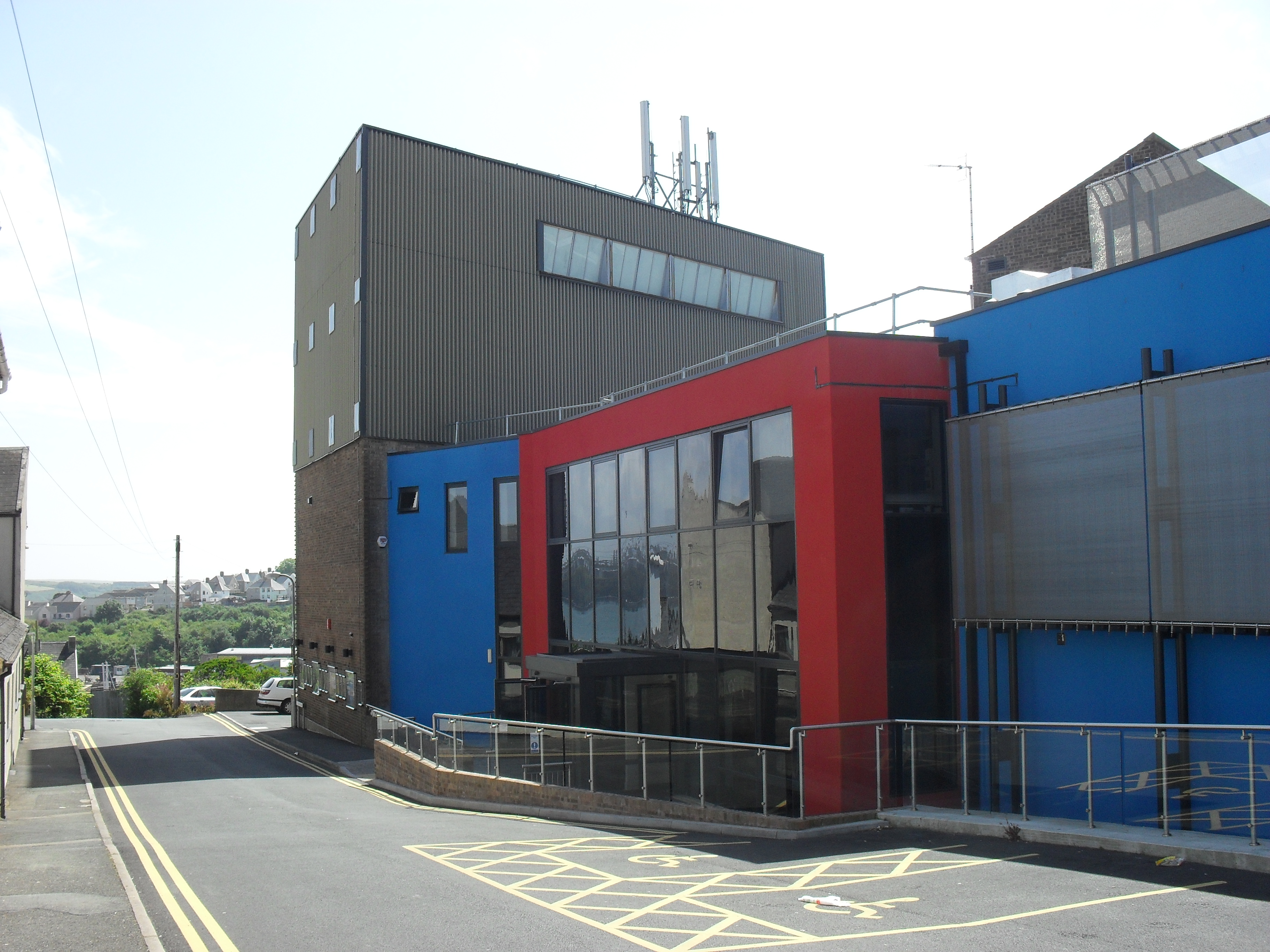
Torch Theatre

The Torch Theatre, opened in 1977 and designed by local architect Monty Minter, is one of only three repertory theatres in Wales, and possesses its own independent theatre company. The Pill Social Centre, operating since the 1950s, is a community hall and events venue, having hosted The Who and Gerry and the Pacemakers. Annual events in the town include the Milford Haven Music Festival in May, Founders Week in June and the carnival in July. Pembrokeshire Fish Week is held biannually in June. Milford Haven library, recently relocated to Havens Head Retail Park offers a full lending service and internet access. Milford Haven Museum, in the marina, houses a collection which focusses on the maritime history of the town.

The Milford & West Wales Mercury weekly newspaper covered the Milford Haven and West Pembrokeshire area. It was founded in 1992 and following a merger of its editorial team with that of the Western Telegraph, its local office was closed in 2008. A second newspaper, The Pembrokeshire Herald, covers the Milford Haven and surrounding areas. The town is also home to several charities, including PATCH and Gwalia.

Milford Haven is twinned with Romilly-sur-Seine, France, and Uman, Ukraine.

=== Literature, film and television ===
Milford Haven appears in literary works, including Shakespeare's Cymbeline as "blessed Milford", and is where King Arthur landed from Ireland in pursuit of the Twrch Trwyth boar as part of the Medieval Welsh prose romance Culhwch and Olwen. Drayton described the area in his Poly-Olbion as "So highly Milford is in every mouth renowned / Noe haven hath aught good, in her that is not found". Lewis Morris made Milford and Hakin the subject of his poem "The Fishing Lass of Hakin", and the gothic novel The Horrors of Oakendale Abbey used Milford as a key location. The town lends its name to the fictional Californian location featured in the novelisations and radio plays by author Mara Purl. Robert Watson uses the town as the principal setting in his novel Slipping Away From Milford, as did Taprell Dorling writing as Taffrail, whose thriller Mystery at Milford Haven explored the 1930s criminal underworld in the area. The town was used as a filming location for the BBC drama The Onedin Line, the 1968 film The Lion in Winter and the 1984 short cult film "Vengeance". The town's Mount Estate was the location for a BBC documentary called The Mount: A Welsh Estate, which received criticism locally for its portrayal of residents. Locations in the town, including Hakin Point and Gelliswick, were used in filming for The Pembrokeshire Murders in 2020.

== Sport and leisure ==
The town possesses a number of venues for sport and leisure. Milford Haven Leisure Centre offers various facilities, including a 25-metre indoor swimming pool, squash and tennis courts, a bowls hall and a dance studio. Thornton Hall, at Milford Haven School, has an indoor sports hall and artificial turf pitch. There are rugby union and association football clubs. Nautical activities are centered around the marina and Pembrokeshire Yacht Club in Gelliswick, which dates to 1923. There is a golf club on the outskirts, which was founded in 1913.

Milford Marina, the site of the former working docks, was re-branded in 1991 and offers retail facilities, the town museum and entertainment. The Marina itself houses 360 berths for private boats.

There was a greyhound racing track in the Hakin area of the town in the 1940s. It was west of Picton Street on the Observatory ground (Rugby ground today). The regularity of the racing in unknown but it is known that the racing was independent, which means unaffiliated to the sports governing body at the time (the National Greyhound Racing Club).

== Education ==
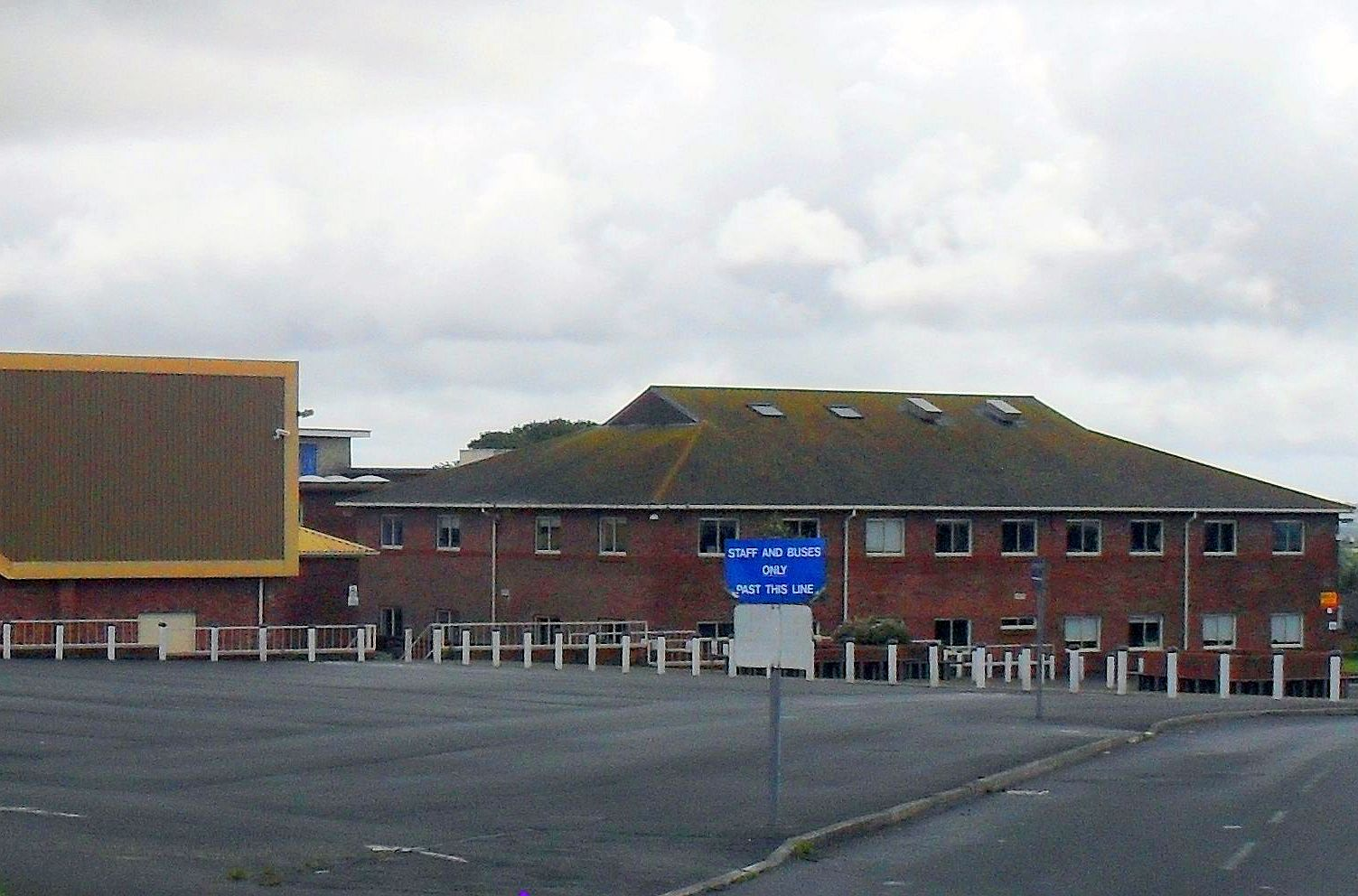
Milford Haven School

Primary and pre-school education in Milford Haven is served by six state infant and primary schools and St Francis, a Roman Catholic primary school. Milford Haven town is served by junior, Infant, and nursery schools. Hakin pupils can attend Hakin Community School, an amalgamation of the former Hakin Junior School and Hakin Infants and Nursery Schools and the voluntarily controlled Hubberston Church in Wales VC Nursery and Primary. Secondary education is provided by Milford Haven School, a large comprehensive school with an enrolment of around 1200 pupils including the 6th form.

The MITEC School of Boatbuilding & Marine Engineering, a branch of Pembrokeshire College in Milford Docks, offers courses in boatbuilding and marine engineering.

== Places of worship ==
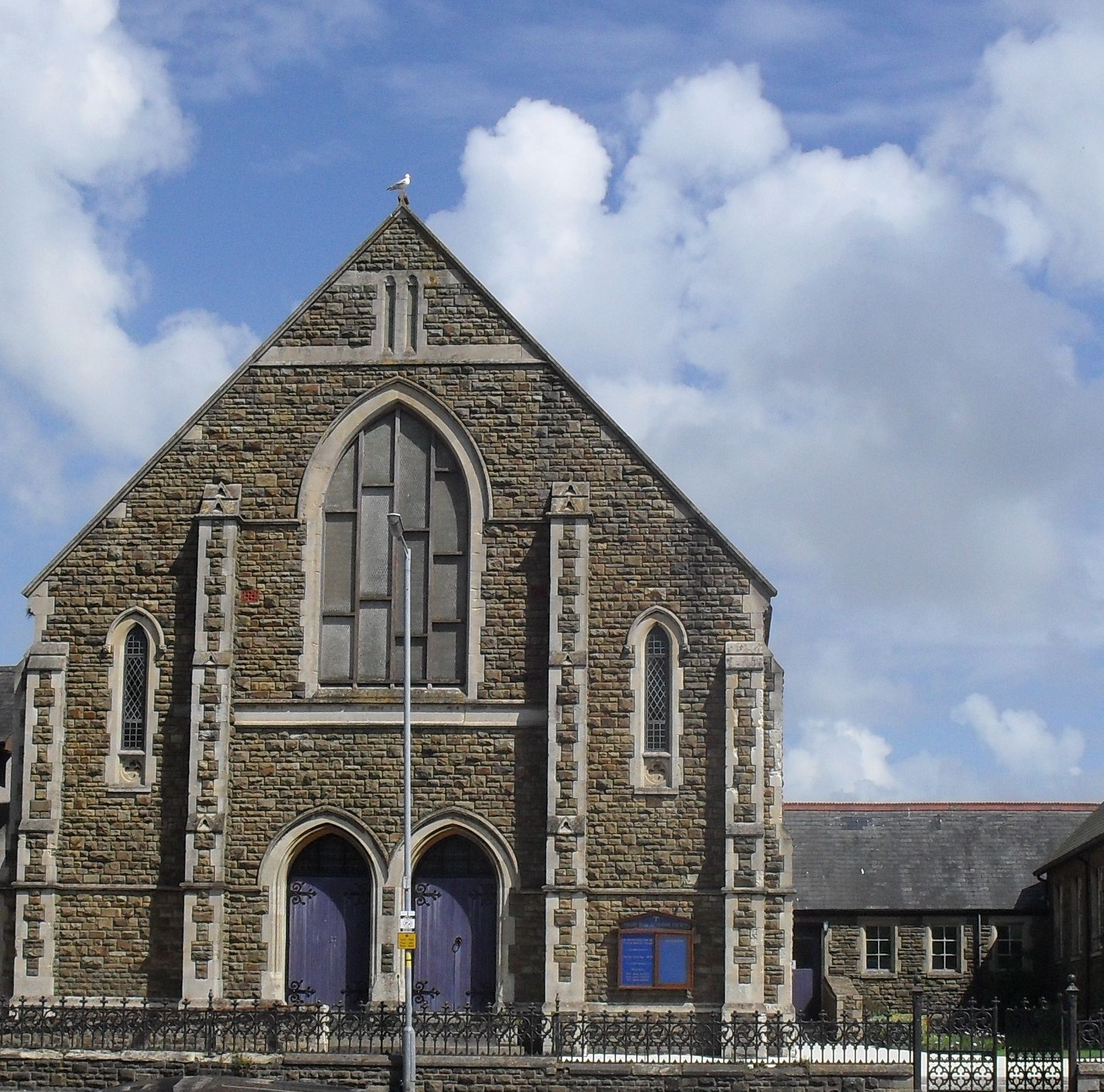
Priory Road Methodist Church, now known as Christ Church, opened 1902

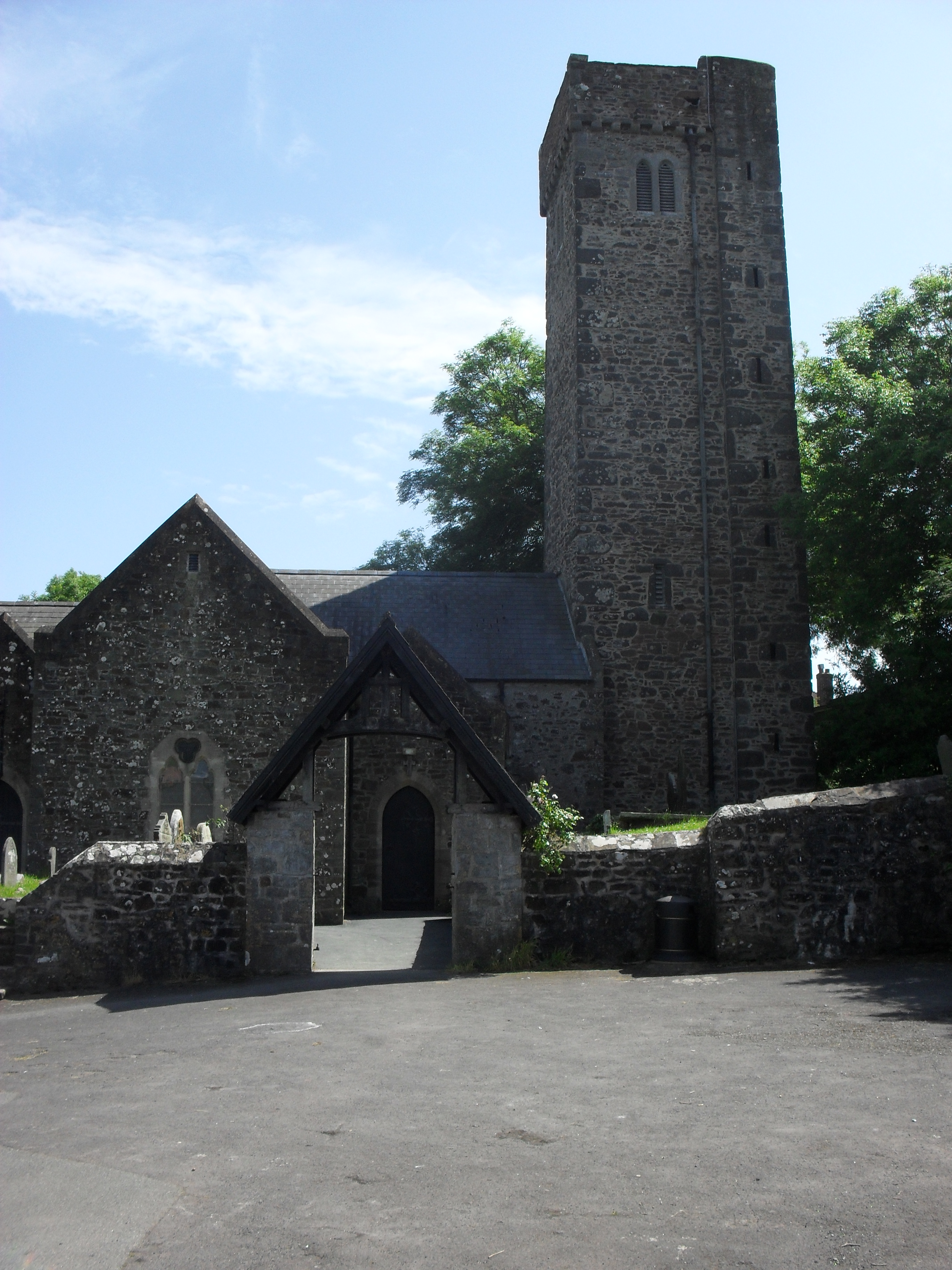
St David's, Hubberston, a 13th century Grade I listed building

At the 2011 census, 8,408 of the 13,907 residents (60.5%) of the parish of Milford Haven identified themselves as Christian. The earliest known religious building in the area was the Benedictine priory, known as Pill Priory, which was dissolved in Henry VIII's reign. Other early buildings included the Catholic St. Thomas à Becket chapel, a later 'beacon church', built around the 12th century which fell into disrepair but was reconsecrated in the 20th century.

The first religious building raised after Milford Haven was founded was the Church in Wales church of St. Katharine and St. Peter. It is considered the town's parish church due to its central position within the town, and the fact that it was built for Charles Francis Greville, the founder of Milford Haven. Other Church in Wales buildings include St. David's in Hubberston, St. Mary's (1927) and the Church of the Holy Spirit (1971) in Hakin, and St. Peter's and St. Cewydd's in Steynton. St. David's is a Norman church, and is believed to be the oldest building in Milford still in regular use. St. Mary's was built in 1927, largely by funds from the local residents of Hakin.

In 2000, the church of St. Clare in Hakin closed, leaving one Roman Catholic church in Milford Haven, St. Francis of Assisi on Priory Road. Baptists congregate at North Road Baptist Church, which is one of the older religious buildings of the community, built in 1878. The Friends' Meeting House (Quakers), built in 1811 by the original Quaker whalers who were central to the early growth of the town, is in Priory Road. Quakers travel from distances around Pembroke to worship at the Friends House.

Members of both the Methodist and United Reformed Churches now worship at Christ Church in Priory Road, formerly known as Priory Road Methodist Church, which was opened in 1902. In recent years the church has drawn together the Methodist Churches in Milford Haven, Hakin Point and Waterston as well as Tabernacle URC to form a new Local Ecumenical Partnership. The Tabernacle URC in Charles Street was built in 1910 by D. Edward Thomas & Sons. In 2011, when it closed the congregation moved to their new home in Christ Church. The Tabernacle URC was purchased by the local Islamic community and is now a fully functioning mosque.

== Twin towns – sister cities ==
Milford Haven is twinned with

- Oissel, Normandy, France
- Uman, Cherkasy Oblast, Ukraine

== Notable people ==
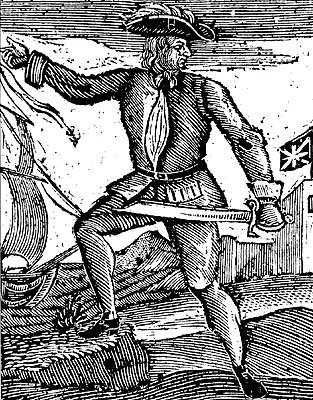
Howell Davies (pirate)

One of the earliest notable figures from the Milford Haven area is Howell Davis, a pirate born in 1680. He was shot dead in 1719 on the Portuguese island of Príncipe. Other famous residents connected as seafarers include Isaac Davis, a former seaman who was engaged in the fur trade between the Pacific Northwest and China. He became an advisor to Kamehameha I and helped form the Kingdom of Hawaii. Milford Haven has produced, or attracted, several notable artists including Arthur Symons, poet, critic, and an art editor of The Savoy magazine, who was born in the town in 1865, and Charles Norris, topographical artist, and author of A Historical Account of Tenby, who lived in Milford Haven from 1800 to 1810. The novelist Alexander Cordell lived briefly in Milford whilst employed by the Admiralty as a quantity surveyor. Journalist John Evans Woolacott, born in Milford 1861, over the course of his career edited or assistant edited various publications including the Democrat, the Weekly Dispatch, The Economist, The Statesman, the Bombay Gazette and The Pioneer. He was elected as president of the Institute of Journalists in 1908.

Performing artists from Milford Haven include Helen Watts, a contralto who studied at the Royal Academy of Music and was awarded the CBE in 1978, and singer-songwriter Sarah Howells, founder member of the pop band Paper Aeroplanes. The painter and actor George Winter (Scum, Merlin of the Crystal Cave) was born in the town. Television producer Annabel Jones was born and raised in Milford Haven, known for her work on the science fiction anthology series Black Mirror. Actor Edward Palmer was born in Milford in 1910, later achieving television and film success in Witchfinder General, The Small Voice, Coronation Street and Upstairs, Downstairs. Novelist Sarah Waters, although born in Neyland, attended Milford Haven Grammar School. Notable academics include Sir James Frederick Rees, born in 1883 and the son of a Hakin dock worker, who became Principal of University College, Cardiff, and author of a number of historical texts, including The Story of Milford. He was appointed a Knight Bachelor in the 1945 New Year Honours. Dorothy Meyler, born 1908, joined University College of Wales, Aberystwyth in 1925, and later enjoyed a successful career teaching in the university, in addition to publishing several academic works. Microbiologist Professor Sir Stewart Cole grew up in Milford Haven and later became the first foreign scientist to lead the world-renowned Institut Pasteur, in Paris, France.

Alfred W. Szlumper was born in Milford in 1858. He was the Chief Engineer of the London and South Western Railway, overseeing the remodelling of Clapham Junction railway station and the reconstruction of London Waterloo station. He was later appointed Chief Engineer of Southern Railway. Tailor and fashion designer Timothy Everest began his professional career working as a sales assistant at a branch of Hepworths in the town. Sporting figures include Robert Hughes, who in 2005 won the Wales National Darts Championship, and Andrew Salter, a batsman for Cardiff MCC University. Footballer Tommy Best played as a centre forward in the Football League for Chester City, Cardiff City and Queens Park Rangers. Another footballer from the town was Marwood Marchant, who played for Cardiff City and Torquay United. William Davies Evans, who from 1800 resided at Castle Pill with his family, is credited with the invention of the celebrated Evans Gambit, debuted in 1826 in London at his defeat of Alexander McDonnell Rosalyn Wild, a resident of the town, achieved fame in 2011 for charity work.

Milford Haven is also connected to notable military figures, such as Charles George Gordon, a British Army officer and administrator, remembered for his campaigns in China and northern Africa. During a two-year stay in Pembroke, he prepared plans for fortifications of Milford Haven. The military naval base at Milford in the First World War was commanded by Admiral Charles Dare and in WWII by Rear Admiral Phillip Esmonde Phillips until 1942, and then by Vice Admiral Bernard William Murray Fairbairn until the end of the war.

Of those born in the town, Hubert William Lewis was awarded the Victoria Cross for acts of bravery in the First World War. W.G. "Gugs" Gwilliam was awarded the Conspicuous Gallantry Medal for acts of bravery whilst serving on board HMS Exeter in the Battle of the River Plate. Other residents include Robert Fulke Greville and his uncle Charles Francis Greville, who improved and expanded Milford Haven as a more commercial and modern settlement, and John Zephaniah Holwell, a surgeon employed by the English East India Company and survivor of the Black Hole of Calcutta, who owned "Castle Hall" in the 1770s. Samuel Lake is remembered for his ambitious bid to complete Milford Docks for £80,000 in a mere seven months in 1880, and his subsequent bankruptcy in 1883 which delayed actual completion for a number of years. An ecclesiastic figure to gain prominence from the town was Frederick Ebenezer Lloyd, an independent Catholic bishop who contributed to the early development of the American Catholic Church. He headed this organization as Primate and Metropolitan from 1920 until his death in 1933.

Milford Haven is the birthplace of serial killer John Cooper, who in 2011 was convicted of murdering siblings Richard and Helen Thomas at their Scoveston home near Steynton in 1985, and Peter and Gwenda Dixon on the Pembrokeshire Coast Path near Little Haven in 1989. He was additionally convicted of the rape of a teenager and assault of four others in woodland near the town's Mount Estate in 1996.

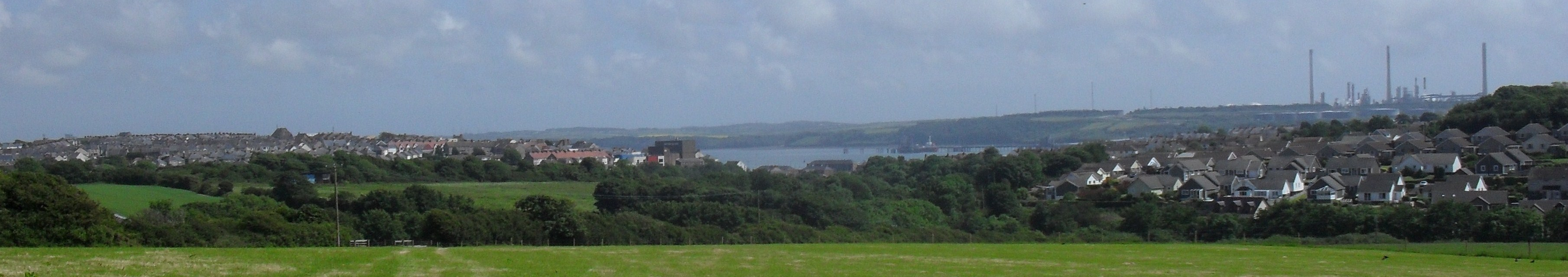
Milford Haven, as viewed from northwest of the town near Havens Head: Milford (left) (Hakin right) June, 2009
