= Milford Haven School =

Coordinates: 51.724184°N 5.023638°W

Location
- Steynton Road; Milford Haven, Pembrokeshire, SA73 1AE; Wales

Information
- Type: Comprehensive
- Motto: Excelsior
- Established: 1988
- Chair of Governors: D Gibby
- Head teacher: Ceri-Ann Morris (April 2018 – present)
- Gender: Co-educational
- Age: 11 to 16
- Language: English
- Colours: Reflex Blue & Yellow
- Website: https://www.milfordhavenschool.co.uk

Milford Haven School is an English medium comprehensive co-educational school of over 1000 students, in Milford Haven, Wales.

== History and Catchment ==
The site of the school was the former Milford Haven Grammar School, opened in 1964. In 1988, a remodelled Comprehensive school was opened, incorporating pupils of the former Central Secondary Modern School. The site had initially been the subject of some criticism of its suitability, due to both its inconvenient distance from the town centre, and also the potential danger of locating the school beside a main road. Its catchment area includes the town of Milford Haven and the area extending westwards to Dale. Just over 18% of pupils are eligible for free school meals compared with the Welsh average of about 15% for secondary schools. Very few pupils come from Welsh-speaking homes. Just under 2% of pupils have statements of special educational needs.

=== Sixth Form ===
In October 2019, school governors wrote to Pembrokeshire County Council requesting that a consultation be carried out to end sixth form provision. Falling pupil numbers, reduced curriculum options and provision not meeting the needs of learners were cited as contributory factors. The announcement provoked a negative reaction in the local community, the response included an online petition and concerns that pupils would have to travel long distances for sixth form education.

== Accommodation and Facilities ==
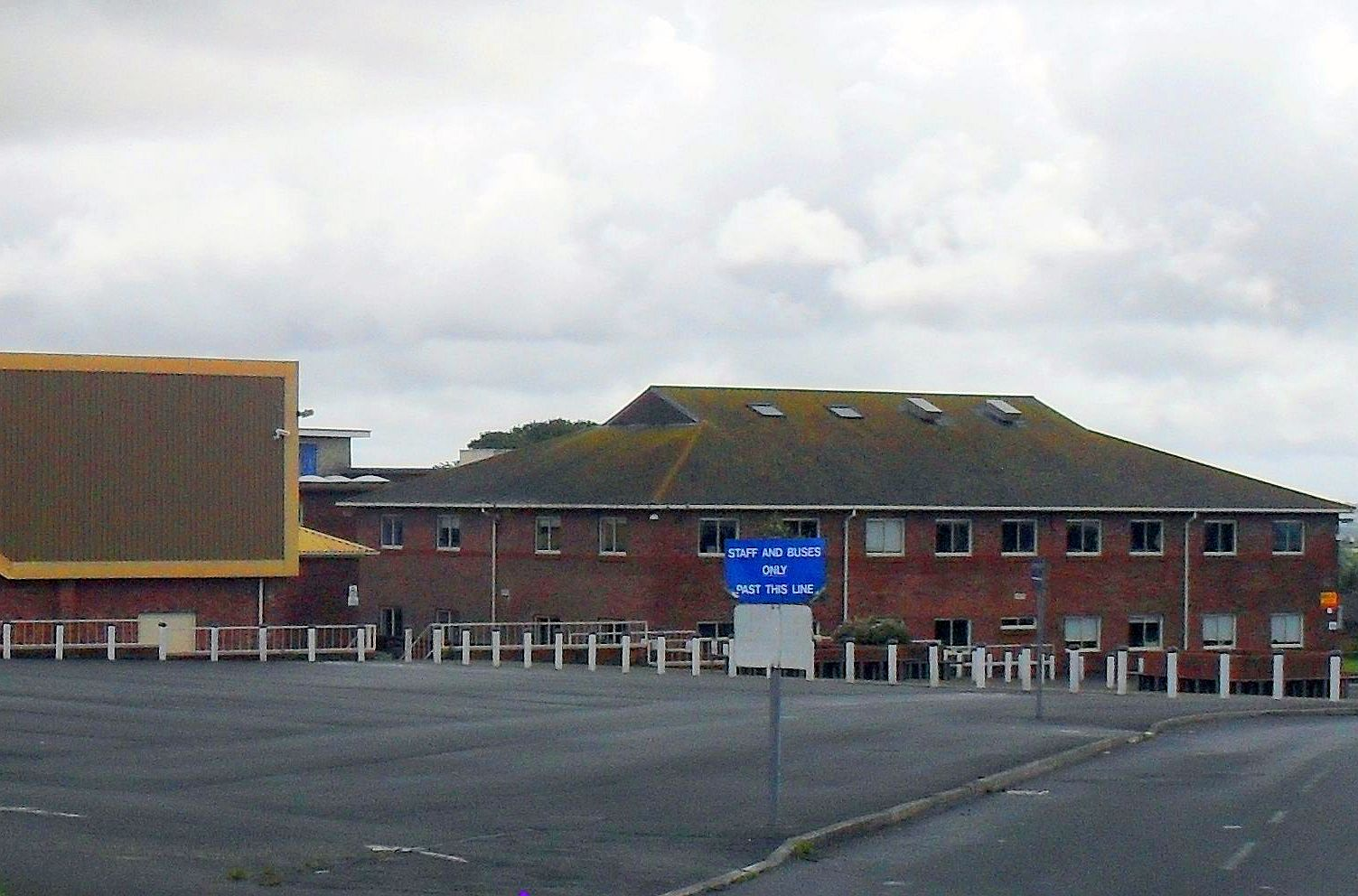
Milford Haven School

The school is located in the northern outskirts of Milford Haven, bordering Steynton. It is surrounded by agricultural land to the north, and private housing estates to the east and west. In addition to the original buildings which comprised the grammar school, four newer blocks are integrated into this structure. Sports facilities include a multi-purpose sports hall and a gymnasium, tennis courts and an all-weather pitch with flood-lighting.

== Staff ==
There are 61 teaching staff, including the Headteacher, two Deputy Heads and two Assistant Heads. Headteacher Mr Islwyn Morgan retired in December 2012, and in January 2013 was replaced by Mr Rod Francis. Rod Francis left the position in September 2017 and was replaced by Acting Headteacher, Beverley Davies. Ceri-Ann Morris took up the position permanently in April 2018.

== Awards and achievements ==
- In November 2024 MHS was the first school to be awarded the Investors in Carers Gold Level.
- In September 2024 the school was the first secondary school in Pembrokeshire to be awarded the UNICEF Gold Rights Respecting School Award.
- In November 2024 the u14 Girls Hockey Team were crowned Pembrokeshire Champions. The team is coached by Miss Griffiths.

== Controversies ==
- 2013 Protest The school became the subject of controversy in October 2013 when a pupil was punished for shaving his head to raise money for charity. This led to a protest on Friday 4 October 2013 attended by 353 pupils, which resulted in the pupil being permitted to return. A joint statement was released by Miss O'Neill (parent of the pupil) and Milford Haven School following the incident.
- 2019 Bullying Incidents In January 2019 the school became the focus of media attention due to two alleged incidents of bullying. Police were called to the school site on 11 January, responding to an incident in which a male pupil was filmed appearing to be assaulted by a large group of children. The video was shared widely on social media. Later in January, a fourteen year old vegan pupil at the school claimed that he was assaulted, and force fed bacon. The boy was left with post-concussion syndrome. The school's spokesman said: 'the matter has been dealt with in accordance with the Governing Body's approved policies and procedures', but according to the pupil's mother, they still feel let down by the school.
- Pupil Suicide In 2017, 14 year old pupil Megan Evans committed suicide at her home, after allegedly being bullied. Her parents accused the school of inaction, in spite of claiming they made it aware of the situation, contributing to her death. A coroner's decision found in 2024 that there was no evidence she was bullied online or in school.
- Teacher Assault & Lockdown In February 2026, a 15‑year‑old pupil at the school was charged with grievous bodily harm and possession of a bladed article after a teacher was assaulted and sustained stab wounds. Following the incident, the school was placed in a temporary lockdown.

== Notable alumni ==
- Sarah Waters, an award-winning novelist.
- John Cooper, a serial killer from Milford Haven attended the Grammar School.
- Andrew Salter (born 1993), cricketer
- George Winter, actor who appeared in the films Scum, and All Quiet on the Western Front.
- Rosalyn Wild, finalist in Britain's Kindest Kid.
- Sarah Howells, a British singer-songwriter and trance vocalist.
- Eric Summons, an Australian children's television personality, comedian and magician.
