= Milford Haven Museum =

Maritime museum in Pembrokeshire, Wales

Coordinates: 51.71256°N 5.040396°W

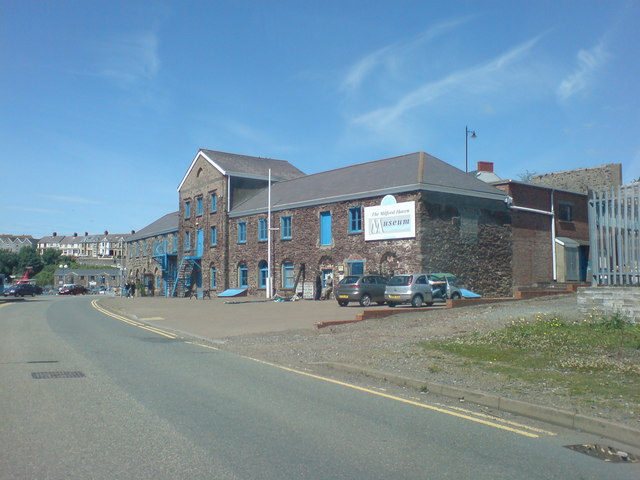
- Established: 1991
- Location: Milford Haven, Pembrokeshire,
- Type: Maritime, Local Heritage, Social History
- Curator: G A Springer
- Website: www.milfordhavenmuseum.co.uk

Milford Haven Museum is a maritime and heritage museum in Milford Haven, Pembrokeshire. Opened in 1991, it has a heavy focus on the maritime history of the town, with exhibitions exploring the fishing and oil industries in the area. The collection also contains information relating to the railway industry in the area, Milford at war, the shipbuilding industry and the Liquefied Natural Gas process. Summer 2013 saw the arrival of a rare Bronze Age wooden trough, discovered locally at St Botolphs in 2006.

The museum is located centrally in the docks area, and is housed in the town's oldest building, the Custom House, which dates back to 1797. A Grade II listed building made of rubble stone, it was designed by Swansea architect, Jernigan, and built for the storage of whale oil. In 2009, the museum was awarded the national quality museum standard.
