= St Thomas à Becket Chapel, Milford Haven =

Church in Pembrokeshire, Wales

Coordinates: 51.710847°N 5.025639°W

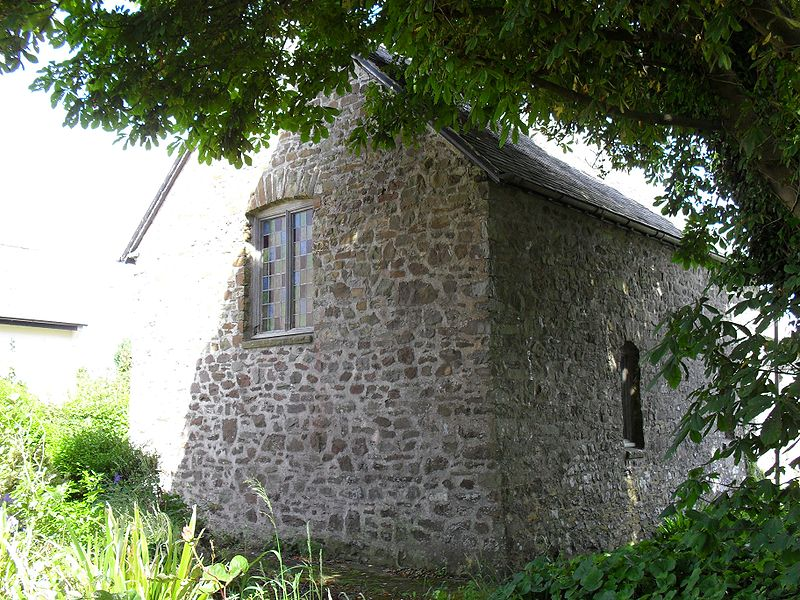
St Thomas à Becket Chapel

St Thomas à Becket Chapel is a Grade II listed building situated in the town of Milford Haven. It was constructed in 1180 and dedicated to St Thomas Becket. It commanded fine views of the Haven estuary, situated on the north bank in open space. Along with two other chapels, now disappeared, at Herbrandston and St Anne's Head, it functioned not only as a Catholic place of worship, but also as a Beacon Chapel, or lighthouse to sailors. The chapel enjoyed a dependent relationship with the nearby Pill Priory. By the 17th century the structure was in ruins, when it was occupied by Parliamentarian forces in 1644. It later acquired a function as storage for the battery located on the Rath.

In the twentieth century, it had become used as a pigsty and stable. In 1930, £1,000 was raised, and the building was reconstructed, work completed in 1938. It was re-consecrated as an Anglican chapel of ease. It is built of rubble stone with a graded slate roof, small nave and chancel, both with pointed barrel vaults. The interior is simple with plastered vaults, small niches each side in chancel and a curved rood beam with rood. The nave south facing windows have stained glass of 1935 and 1939 to Sir Hugh Thomas of Castle Hall. In 2012 it was privately sold, in spite of local opposition. In 2025 an application to Pembrokeshire Council was made to change the use of the building to provide an ancillary use for an adjacent dwelling, including the installation of suspended floor over original flagstone flooring, drainage connection for the provision of a toilet, and the addition of a first floor to be bolted to the existing stone walls.
