= Samuel Lake =

- Born: 1842; Dartmouth
- Died: 1887 (aged 44–45)
- Occupations: Trawler owner, civil engineer
- Known for: Civil Engineer, Steam Trawlers

Samuel Lake AM (1842–1887) was a general merchant, civil engineer, and pioneering designer and builder of steam trawlers, from Dartmouth, Devon in the United Kingdom.

In his civil engineering work in the 1860s he constructed one of the first rows of terraced cottages to be built out of poured shuttered concrete, using what was then a revolutionary building material and technique. They were then known as Coombe Terrace, today numbers 12 to 21 Coombe Road, and were built for Lake himself and for his employees.

Lake's trawler work was in conjunction with George Parker Bidder, also of Dartmouth, and proved to be a technical success, but not at that time to be commercially viable.

Lake spent a substantial part of his life in India. In 1867 Lake of the Bombay Reclamation Company was awarded the Albert Medal for his bravery in helping rescue the crew and some 400 Muslim pilgrims from a shipwreck off Bombay. He returned to Dartmouth in 1866.

Lake was contracted in 1879 to build Milford Haven and in 1881 Felixstowe Docks but went bankrupt.

Lake Street in Dartmouth is named after him.
