= Milford Haven Town Hall =

Municipal Building in Milford Haven, Wales

- Neuadd y Dref Aberdaugleddau (Welsh)
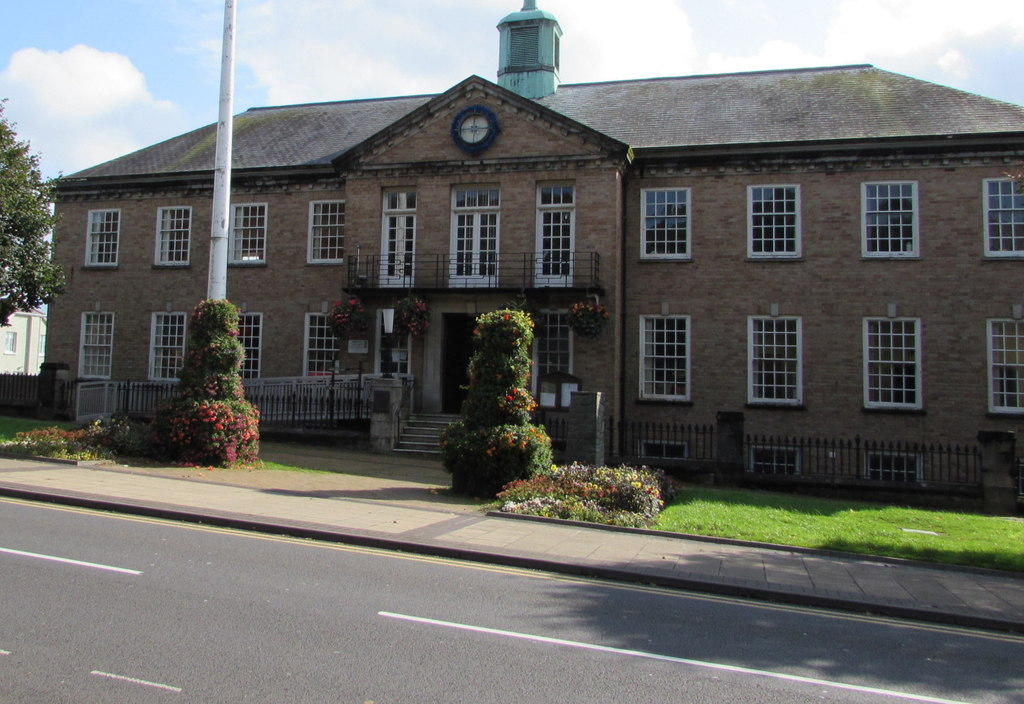
- Milford Haven Town Hall

- Shown in Pembrokeshire
- 51.7114°N 5.0298°W
- Location: Hamilton Terrace, Milford Haven

History
- Built: 1939

Site notes
- Architectural style: Neo-Georgian style

Milford Haven Town Hall (Welsh: Neuadd y Dref Aberdaugleddau) is a municipal structure in Hamilton Terrace, Milford Haven, Pembrokeshire, Wales.

== History ==
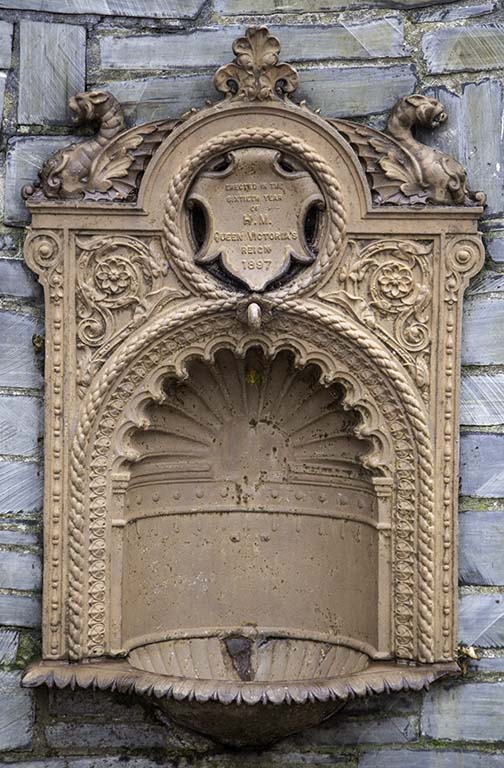
Drinking fountain outside the town hall

The Milford Improvement Act 1857 (20 & 21 Vict. c. 74) appointed improvement commissioners to govern the growing port town. Under the Local Government Act 1894 the improvement commissioners' district was reconstituted as the Milford Haven Urban District, with an elected council. Initially, council leaders established accommodation for council officers and their departments in Charles Street. In the early 1930s, civic leaders decided to procure a more substantial structure: the site they chose on the south side of Hamilton Terrace was occupied by allotment gardens.

The new building was designed in the Neo-Georgian style, was built in brown brick with stone facings and was officially opened by the former Prime Minister, David Lloyd George, on 31 August 1939. The design involved a symmetrical main frontage with eleven bays facing onto Hamilton Terrace; the central section of three bays, which slightly projected forward, featured a doorway on the ground floor with a stone surround. There was a cast iron balcony with a French door flanked by two tall windows on the first floor and a modillioned pediment above with a clock in the tympanum. The outer sections were fenestrated with square headed sash windows on both floors and featured a modillioned cornice at roof level. There was also a central turret on the roof. Internally, the principal rooms were the council chamber and the mayor's parlour. When it first opened, the town hall also included facilities for the local fire engine.

A drinking fountain, which had been cast by the Saracen Foundry in the form of a font and inscribed with the words "erected in the sixtieth year of H.M. Queen Victoria's Reign 1897" as part of celebrations for the Diamond Jubilee of Queen Victoria, was relocated from Charles Street to the front of the town hall shortly after it opened.

The building continued to serve as the headquarters of the urban district council for much of the 20th century, but ceased to be the local seat of government when the enlarged Preseli Pembrokeshire District Council was formed in 1974. However, it subsequently became the offices and meeting place of Milford Haven Town Council. In the early 21st century it became an approved venue for weddings and civil partnership ceremonies and the first wedding took place in June 2010.

Pembrokeshire County Council declared the building as surplus to requirements in December 2019, and marketed it for sale in early 2020; the planning authority subsequently approved change of use to offices on condition that the town council be allowed to remain in the building under its new ownership.
