= Charles Dare =

British Royal Navy Rear-Admiral (1854–1924)

Admiral Sir Charles Dare KCMG CB MVO
- Born: 9 November 1854; North Curry, Somerset, England
- Died: 6 August 1924 (aged 69); Shotley, Suffolk
- Burial place: Suffolk
- Spouse: Emily Agnes Harper
- Parent(s): Charles William Dare, Anne Agnes (née Mew)
- Military career
- Allegiance: Great Britain; United Kingdom
- Branch: Royal Navy
- Service years: 1868–1909, 1915–1919
- Rank: Admiral; Captain (RNR)

Admiral Sir Charles Holcombe Dare KCMG CB MVO (9 November 1854 – 6 August 1924) was an English Royal Navy officer. He commanded several ships and shore establishments before and during World War I, and was knighted by King George V.

== Family and personal life ==
Dare was born on 9 November 1854 to Charles William Dare, a lawyer with a practice in London, and Anne Agnes (née Mew, from Newport, Isle of Wight) in North Curry, Somerset, one of four brothers and a sister. Dare's grandfather, also Charles Holcombe Dare, was a Land Tax Commissioner for North Curry. The family had connections in London and the Isle of Wight. Dare married Emily Agnes Harper, a railway guard's daughter who, unusually for the time, brought an illegitimate daughter, Maud, to the marriage. In 1917, it was noted that Dare had donated a collection of local birds and birds' eggs to the Somerset Archaeological Society.

== Naval career ==
=== Early career ===
Dare enlisted in the Royal Navy as an officer cadet, first serving as a midshipman on HMS Monarch, and was commissioned in 1868. He was a sub-lieutenant until 1879, when he was promoted to lieutenant. In 1893, he was promoted to commander.

=== Command ===
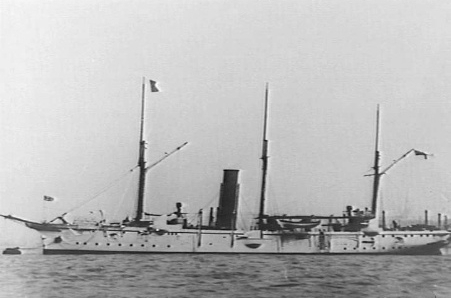
HMS Archer in 1888

On his promotion to commander, Dare was given command of HMS Lapwing, a Redbreast-class gunboat, one of the last built of composite materials. In 1898, he was in command of HMS Archer, serving for a time in the Far East. He was appointed in command of the third class cruiser HMS Bellona in June 1899, while she was serving in on the Mediterranean Station, and promoted to full captain on 30 June 1900, when he was reappointed to the Bellona, temporary on promotion.

In 1903, he was given command of HMS Assistance to carry out sea trials off Sheerness; the first of her type, she was a "floating dockyard" designed to go to sea with the fleet, and cost £213,000. In December 1903 he was put in command of the new armoured cruiser HMS Berwick, seeing service with the 2nd Cruiser Squadron; in March 1904 she returned to Chatham from the West Indies for a refit. In September the same year Dare was appointed to the Royal Victorian Order. In 1906, he was in command of HMS Ramillies for six months, following which, in September, he was put in command of the Eastern Coastguard District until April 1909.

In 1908 Dare was awarded a Good Service Pension of £150 per annum.

=== Flag ===
In March 1909, Dare was promoted to Rear Admiral on the retirement of Rear Admiral Fegan, conforming to the Navy's regulations on the permitted number of serving senior officers. Four months later, he placed himself on the retired list. At this time he was living near Ipswich and a vice-president of Erwarton Quoit Club, and made a speech on the occasion of the rector of Harkstead's 70th birthday.

=== World War I ===
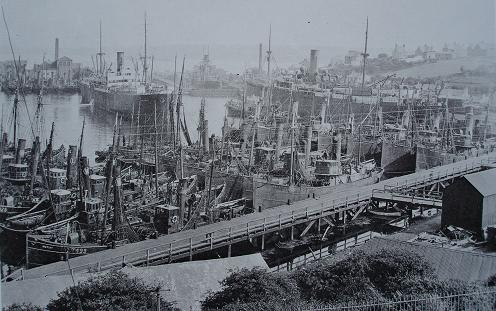
Milford Dock in 1921

On 10 November 1914, Dare was given a temporary commission of commander in the Royal Naval Reserve. A few months after the outbreak of the First World War, having been placed on the retired list as Vice-Admiral, Dare was made a captain in the Royal Naval Reserve and in 1915 took command of HMS Idaho, the shore establishment at Milford Haven, to counter the threat from German U-boats to shipping, including convoys, in the area. In the 1917 Birthday Honours, Dare was made a Companion of the Bath. In the December, Dare and his wife opened the new Trafalgar Institute for Seafarers in Milford Haven, erected and furnished at a cost of £1,548, paying tribute to the Welsh fishermen of the RNR:

If the Grand Fleet did anything the "Daily Mail" would tell them all about it, but about his men, well, wait till after it was all over (applause)

In September 1918, Dare's promotion to full Admiral (retired) was posted. At the end of the war, Dare paid tribute to all who had served at the Milford base.

=== Post-war ===
Dare was knighted by King George V in May 1919, the citation reading: For valuable services in command of the important Auxiliary Patrol Base of Milford Haven since February 1915. On 31 July 1919, Dare struck his flag at Milford Haven, the ceremony being performed aboard the trawler Idaho.

== Death ==
Admiral Dare died on 6 August 1924 in Shotley, near Ipswich, aged 69; his death was reported in The Times. His wife survived him and his estate was valued at £2,593. His daughter, Maud G. Dare, left a 1915 family photograph album to The National Maritime Museum.
