= Jean II de Rieux =

Marshal of France (1342–1417)

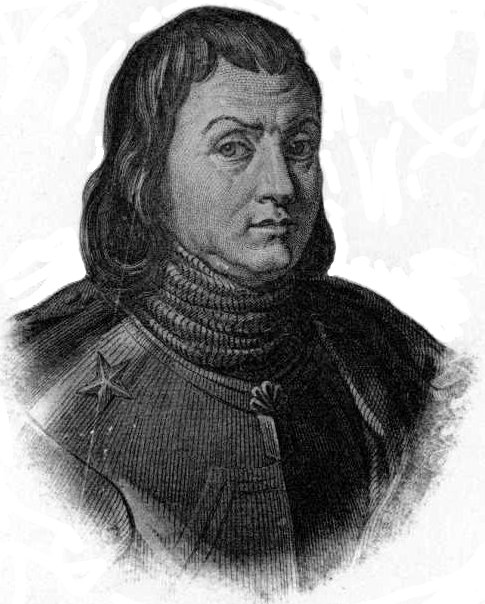
Posthumous portrait of Jean II de Rieux

Jean II de Rieux (1342 - 1417) Breton Lord of Rieux, Rochefort and Ancenis, initially in the service of Brittany, but also eventually a Marshal of France in the service of King Charles VI. He was the great-grandfather of Jean IV de Rieux.

== Career ==
=== With the Duchy of Brittany and the Kingdom of England ===
Jean fought under the command of Edward, the Black Prince, son of King Edward III of England, participating in the Battle of Nájera (1367), against the French and Castilian forces led by Bertrand du Guesclin and King Henry II of Castille. Although the English won the battle, the Black Prince went bankrupt.

He was one of the signatories of the second Treaty of Guérande in 1381 as a representative for the John IV, Duke of Brittany. The Duke had restored his rights and agreed to make a small tribute to the King Charles VI. Furthermore, Brittany would stay neutral in continuing military conflicts between France and England.

=== With the Kingdom of France ===
Jean then offered his services to France. In 1382 he fought at the Battle of Roosebeke. In 1397, De Rieux was appointed as Marshal of France.

In 1405, he was sent to Wales to help the Welsh under Owain Glyndŵr in Glyndŵr's Rebellion. He had left Brest in July with more than 3,000 knights and men-at-arms. Unfortunately, the army had not been provided with sufficient fresh water and many warhorses had died. He did though bring modern siege equipment. Joined by Owain Glyndŵr's forces the French marched inland and took the town of Haverfordwest but failed to take the castle. He then marched on England, but the result of this expedition was not successful.

His age and the injuries that he had received over the years eventually prevented him from performing his duties. He was, at his request, relieved from his duties at 12 August 1417. He died the same year in his castle at Rochefort, where he was buried.
