= Steynton =

Parish in Pembrokeshire, Wales

Coordinates: 51.72952°N 5.017351°W

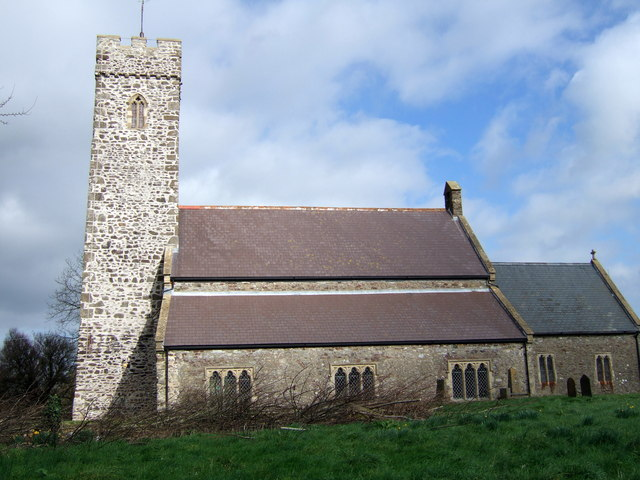
- Parish church of SS Cewydd and Peter

- Location within Pembrokeshire
- Population: 3,000
- OS grid reference: SM914076
- Principal area: Pembrokeshire
- Preserved county: Dyfed
- Country: Wales
- Sovereign state: United Kingdom
- Post town: Milford Haven
- Postcode district: SA73
- Dialling code: 01646
- Police: Dyfed-Powys
- Fire: Mid and West Wales
- Ambulance: Welsh
- UK Parliament: Preseli Pembrokeshire

Steynton or Stainton is a parish in the county of Pembrokeshire, Wales, formerly in the hundred of Rhôs and now an area of Milford Haven and in the Community of Tiers Cross. The parish includes the hamlet of Dreenhill, near Haverfordwest. The parish population is about 3,000.

== Geography ==
Steynton has a crossroads from which roads lead to Milford Haven to the south, and from it toward Johnston and Haverfordwest in the north and Jordanston and Pembroke, Pembroke Dock and Neyland to the east. The road to the west leads to the hamlet of Thornton. The parish includes the hamlet of Dreenhill, near Haverfordwest, as well as other settlements.

Steynton has a pub, the Horse and Jockey.

== Dreenhill ==
While Steynton village is in the south of the parish, Dreenhill is a hamlet in the north (National Grid reference SM924134) on the B4327 road 1 mile (1.6 km) southwest of Haverfordwest. Dreenhill has a Calvanistic Methodist Chapel, established in 1834. The hamlet has a garage, The Masons pub and restaurant (formerly the Masons Arms) and a few houses, and is surrounded by farmland.

== History ==
The toponym is likely derived from the Old English tun, meaning settlement or manor.

Steynton was once a medieval parish and village, with a parish church dedicated to Saints Cewydd and Peter. The oldest parts of the present church may be 14th or 15th century. The church may have had links with Pill Priory, which is about 2 miles (3 km) to the south. The church tower was used as a musketry position in the English Civil War action at Pill Fort in Milford Haven. The church is directly in line with St Katherine's church to the south and Johnston church to the north. The parish was about 6 miles (10 km) long from north to south, and up to 2 miles (3 km) wide from east to west. The ancient parish extended almost as far as Haverfordwest to the north.

Steynton was originally separate from Milford Haven, being about 2 miles (3 km) north-north-east of Milford, but Milford Haven has expanded and absorbed it. Steynton is part of the local government community of Miford Haven.

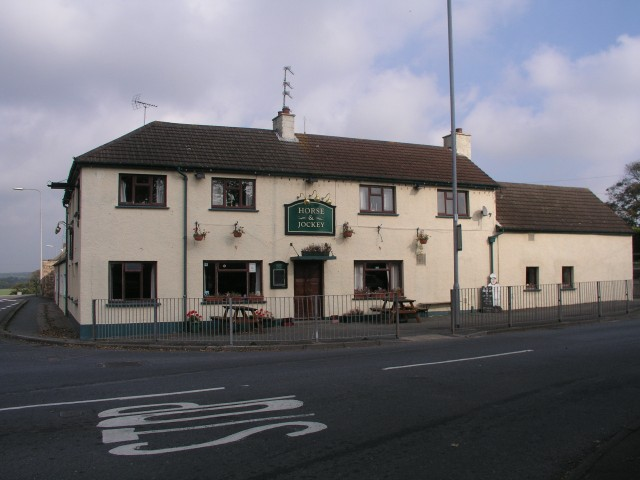
The Horse and Jockey pub
