= Pill Priory =

Coordinates: 51.724596°N 5.037942°W

Pill Priory, Tironensian Monastery (ruins)
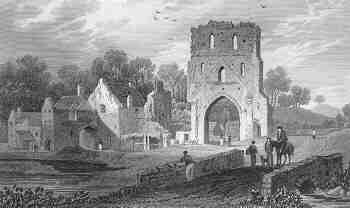

Religion
- Affiliation: Catholicism Benedictine
- Region: Milford Haven, Wales
- Ecclesiastical or organizational status: Private

Location
- Location: Milford Haven, South Wales, United Kingdom
- Interactive map of Pill Priory, Tironensian Monastery (ruins)

Architecture
- Founder: Adam de la Roche
- General contractor: Tironensian monks
- Completed: Second half, 12th century

Specifications
- Height (max): 10 metres (33 ft)
- Materials: Old Red Sandstone, Carboniferous Limestone

Pill Priory is a Tironian house founded near Milford Haven, Pembrokeshire, South West Wales in the late 12th century.

Pill Priory was founded as a daughter house of St Dogmaels Abbey (raised to Abbey status in 1120), near Cardigan, itself a priory of the Tironensian order of reformed Benedictine monks. The other daughter houses were Caldey (Caldey Island, Pembrokeshire, Wales) and Glascarrig, County Wexford in Ireland.

Pill Priory was established by the Roche family of the Barony and Roch Castle, Pembrokeshire and was founded within a few years of St Dogmaels. The founder was Adam de la Roche, a descendant of Godebert de Fleming. E. M. Pritchard thought it to be around 1180–90, while the Pembrokeshire antiquarian Richard Fenton considered the earlier date of 1160–70 to be possible.

The priory was jointly dedicated to the Blessed Virgin Mary and to St Budoc, a dedication of it was the former chapel of St Budoc (now "St Botolph") which lay 1.3 km north-east of Pill Priory.

The community may always have been small; it was recorded as five monks in 1534 and four in 1536.

The priory site and its environs, including five orchards, a wood and a meadow at Pill, the priory mill and several other possessions including St Budoc's and Steynton Church were demised by the crown to John Doune who, in 1544, confirmed the grant of his interest to John Wogan who in turn had been the lessee of the "Priory" in 1536–7.

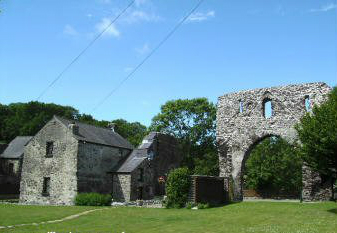
Remains of Pill Priory 2010

In 1536 St Dogmaels Abbey and its daughters at Pill and Caldey were dissolved in the suppression of those monastic houses with values of less than £200 and fell to the crown. The Valor Ecclesiasticus recorded that Pill Priory was worth annually £67 15s. 3d. gross, £52 2S. 5d. net after charges. The manor of Pill, including the priory site and associated holdings, was sold in June 1546 to the aspiring local landowners Roger Barlow of Slebech and his brother Thomas.

An account of Pill Priory by the Pembrokeshire antiquarian Richard Fenton, writing c. 1811, describes the priory ruins much as they survive today.

The entire site remains in private hands. The free-standing remains of the priory church's chancel arch is now the most striking element of the site, and forms a garden feature, together with the remains of the south transept. The Pill Priory Cottage living quarters contain elements from the conventual buildings which were arranged around a more-or-less formalised cloister. The remains of all are constructed from Old Red Sandstone and Carboniferous Limestone, both from local sources.

The chancel arch and south transept are designated as scheduled monuments by Cadw (the Welsh Government historic environment service). The living quarters are listed as Grade II*.
