= List of town walls in England and Wales =

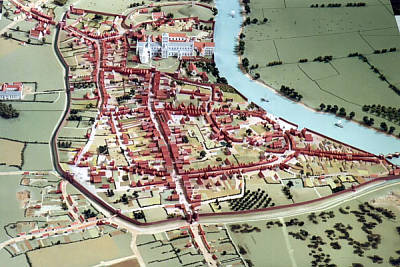
Model of Worcester city walls as they were in 1250, viewed from the north, based on archaeological and historical data available in 2000.

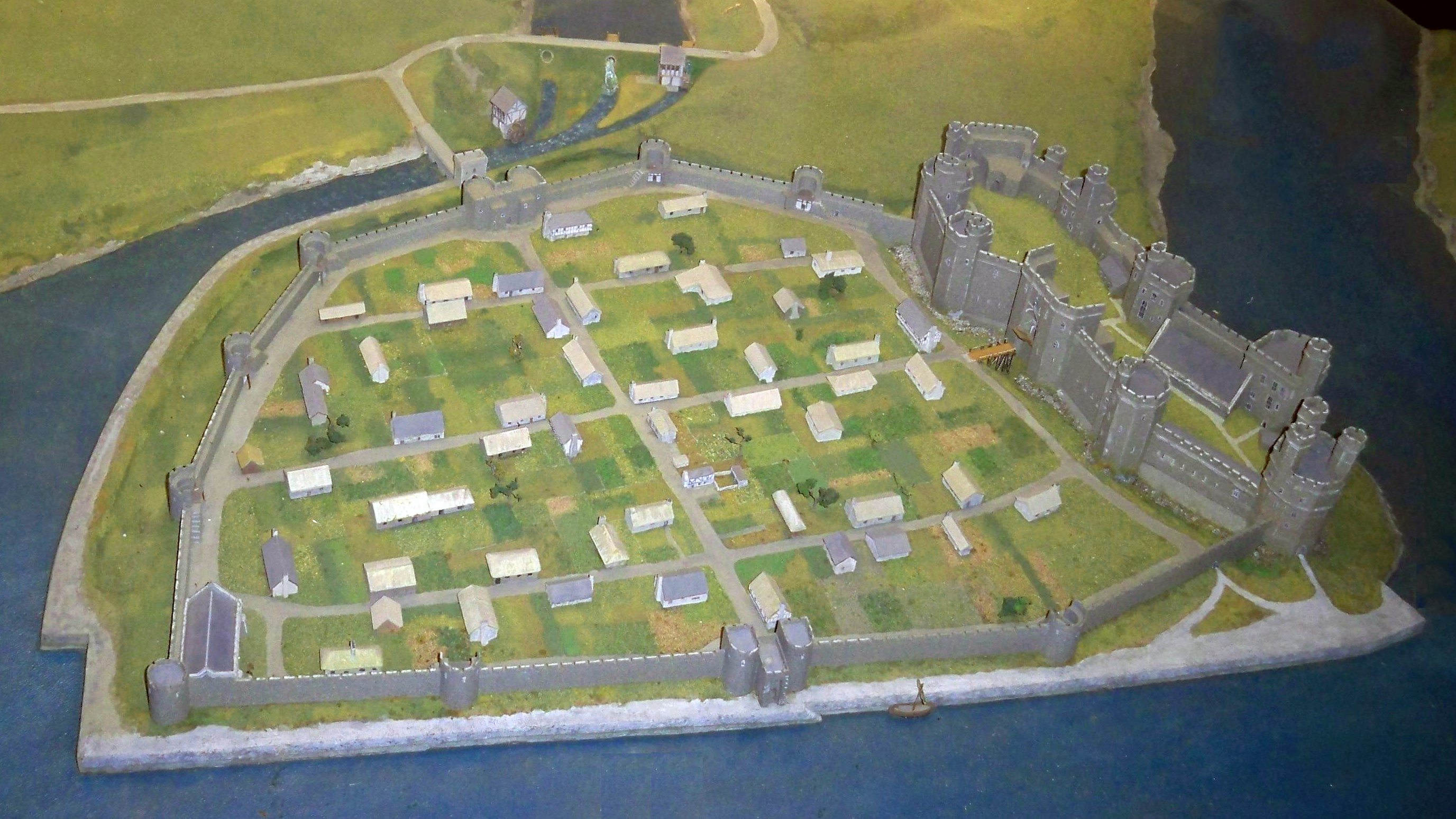
Model of Caernarfon showing the town walls and Caernarfon Castle (right) shortly after their completion in the 13th century, as viewed from the west

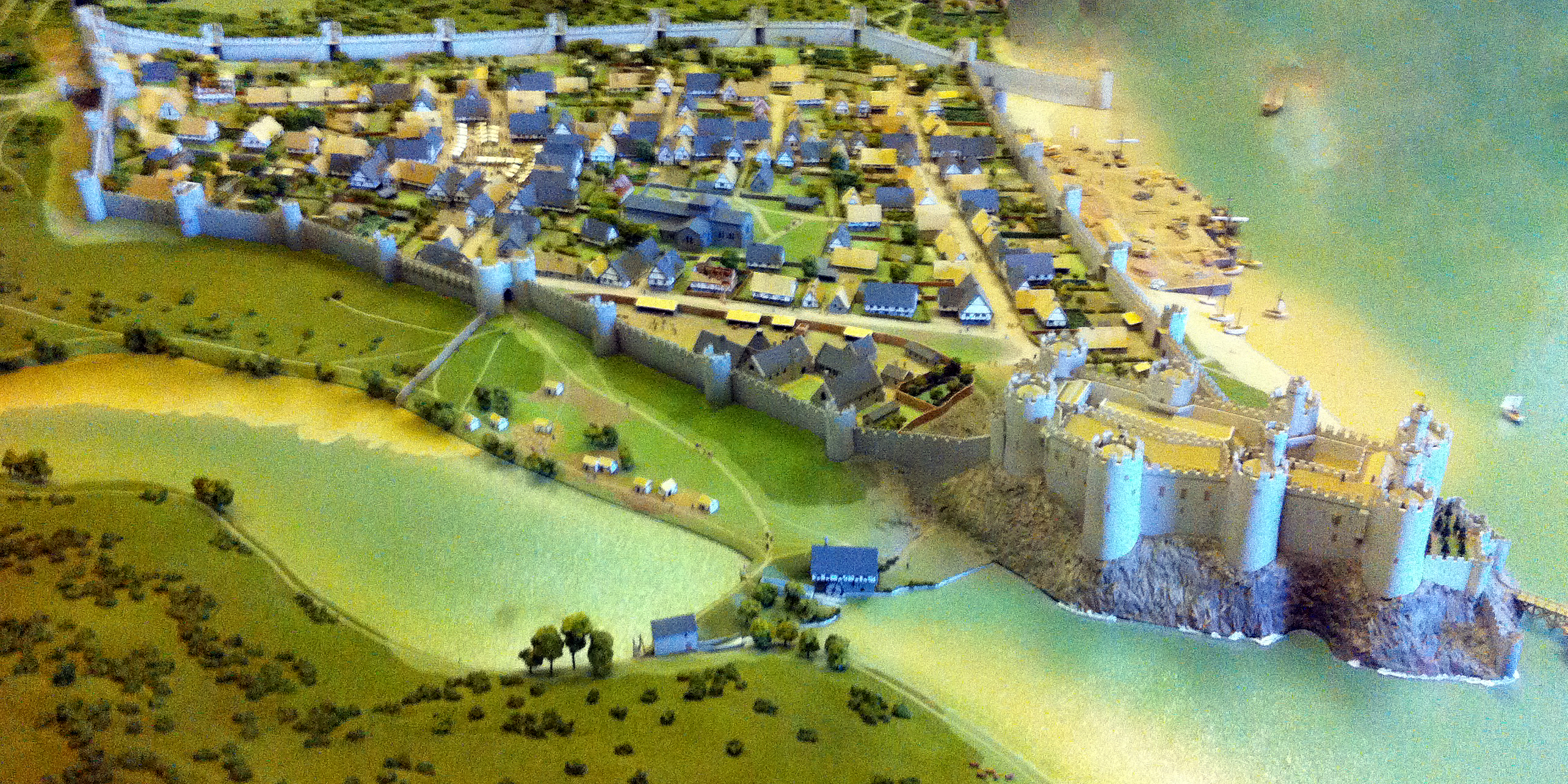
Model of Conwy showing the town walls and Conwy Castle (right) after completion in the 13th century

This list of town walls in England and Wales describes the fortified walls built and maintained around these towns and cities from the 1st century AD onwards. The first town walls were built by the Romans, following their conquest of Britain in 43 AD. The Romans typically initially built walled forts, some of which were later converted into rectangular towns, protected by either wooden or stone walls and ditches. Many of these defences survived the fall of the Roman Empire in the 4th and 5th centuries, and were used in the unstable post-Roman period. The Anglo-Saxon kings undertook significant planned urban expansion in the 8th and 9th centuries, creating burhs, often protected with earth and wood ramparts. These burh walls sometimes utilised older Roman fortifications, and themselves frequently survived into the early medieval period.

The Norman invaders of the 11th century initially focused on building castles to control their new territories, rather than town walls to defend the urban centres, but by the 12th century many new town walls were built across England and Wales, typically in stone. Edward I conquered North Wales in the late 13th century and built a number of walled towns as part of a programme of English colonisation. By the late medieval period, town walls were increasingly less military in character and more closely associated with civic pride and urban governance: many grand gatehouses were built in the 14th and 15th centuries. The English Civil War in 1640s saw many town walls pressed back into service, with older medieval structures frequently reinforced with more modern earthwork bastions and sconces. By the 18th century, however, most town walls were falling into disrepair: typically they were sold off and demolished, or hidden behind newer buildings as towns and cities expanded.

In the 20th century there was a resurgence in historical and cultural interest in these defences. Those towns and cities that still had intact walls renovated them to form tourist attractions. Some of Edward I's town walls in North Wales were declared part of the internationally recognised UNESCO World Heritage Site. Urban redevelopment has frequently uncovered new remnants of the medieval walls, with archaeological work generating new insights into the Roman and Anglo-Saxon defences.

== List ==
Name	Location	Period of construction	Condition of remains	Image	Notes
Abergavenny town walls	Abergavenny, Monmouthshire		Masonry fragments		A small Norman wall was built around the town in the 11th century, linked to Abergavenny Castle. The Norman wall was demolished in the 12th century and a new stone wall was built in the late 13th century, approximately 350 by 215 metres (1,100 ft × 710 ft). This was destroyed by the modern period.
	Aberystwyth, Ceredigion		Vestiges		A small section of the medieval walls still remain near the castle on the seafront.
Alnwick town walls	Alnwick, Northumberland		Substantial		The walls were built in the 15th century to protect Alnwick against border instability and raiding, and commemorated the powerful local Percy family, who controlled the local castle.
Bath city walls	Bath, Somerset		Fragmentary		Bath's first walls were built by the Romans. The Anglo-Saxons established a fortified burh at Bath, utilising the existing walls, and they were further strengthened during the medieval period. Parts of one medieval gatehouse still survive.
Beaumaris town walls	Beaumaris, Anglesey		Vestiges		The town was captured by Owain Glyndŵr in 1400. Once recaptured by English forces, a stone wall with three gates was built around the town, and maintained until the late 17th century.
Berwick town walls	Berwick-upon-Tweed, Northumberland		Substantially intact		The first walls built in the early 14th century under Edward I were 2 mi (3.2 km) long. Replaced in 1560 by a set of Italian-inspired walls with 5 large stone bastions, the walls are today the best-preserved post-medieval town defences in England.
Beverley town walls	Beverley, East Riding of Yorkshire		Substantial		12th century Beverley was protected by a "great ditch" rather than a stone wall. In the early 15th century three brick gatehouses were built; more ditches and other fortifications were later added, but these failed to protect the town during the Civil War.
	Bolsover, Derbyshire	Probably 11th or 12th century.	Vestiges		Bank and ditch rampart, approximately 8 metres (26 ft) in width at the base and 2 to 3 metres (6 ft 7 in to 9 ft 10 in) in height.
Brecon#Town walls	Brecon, Powys		Vestiges		Originally constructed by Humphrey de Bohun after 1240, the walls were built of stone, with four gatehouses and 10 semi-circular bastions. They were largely destroyed during the English Civil War.
	Bridgnorth, Shropshire		Vestiges		Bridgnorth's town walls were initially constructed in timber between 1216 and 1223; murage grants allowed them to be upgraded to stone between the 13th and 15th centuries including five gates.
	Bristol		Fragmentary		St John's Gate is built into the Church of St John the Baptist under its spire; the line of the walls is walkable.
Caernarfon town walls	Caernarfon	1283–92	Largely intact		Constructed by Edward I at a cost of £3,500, alongside the castle, the walls are 2,408 ft (734 m) long and include eight towers and two gatehouses. Today they form part of the UNESCO world heritage site administered by Cadw.
	Venta Silurum, Caerwent, Monmouthshire	Roman	Substantial		The surviving walls are one of the most impressive monuments from Roman Britain.
Canterbury city walls	Canterbury, Kent	3rd-16th centuries	Substantial		First built by the Romans in the 3rd century, retained by the Anglo-Saxons, the walls were rebuilt in the late 14th century owing to fears of a French invasion and feature early gunports. Over half of the original circuit, with 17 out of 24 towers, survives.
Cardiff town walls	Cardiff	12th-15th centuries	Vestiges		First recorded in 1111, the walls were 1.28 mi (2.06 km) long and 10 ft (3.0 m) high with five town gates. Sections collapsed in the 18th century, many stones being reused as building material. The last large section was demolished in 1901. One of the town gates remains just west of the castle, the "West Gate".
Carlisle city walls	Carlisle, Cumbria		Substantial		
Castle Acre Castle and town walls	Castle Acre, Norfolk		Fragmentary		
Chepstow Port Wall	Chepstow, Monmouthshire		Substantial		A late 13th-century stone wall constructed for the twin purposes of defence and tax collection.
Chester city walls	Chester, Cheshire	70 AD–12th century	Largely intact		Chester's walls were originally built by the Romans between 70 and 80 AD and were used by the burh in 907. The Norman walls were extended to the west and the south to form a complete circuit, which now provides a walkway of about 2 mi (3.2 km).
	Chichester, West Sussex		Substantial		
	Cirencester, Gloucestershire	3rd–4th century	Vestiges		Remnants of the stone walls of the Roman town of Corinium Dobunnorum are visible in the Abbey Grounds.
	Colchester, Essex		Substantial		The walls were built between 65 and 80 AD after the destruction of the town by Boudicca, and they continued in use until after the Siege of Colchester in 1648. Two large stretches survive on the west and north sides and a number of fragments are visible along the rest of the circuit nearly 2 miles (3.2 kilometres). The Balkerne Gate is the most complete gateway from Roman Britain.
Conwy town walls	Conwy		Largely intact		Constructed between 1283 and 1287 after the foundation of Conwy by Edward I, the walls are 0.8 mi (1.3 km) long, with 21 towers and three gatehouses, and formed an integrated system of defence alongside Conwy Castle.
Coventry city walls	Coventry, West Midlands	1350s–1534	Fragmentary		With its walls nearly 2.2 mi (3.5 km) around and 12 ft (3.7 m) high, with 32 towers and 12 gatehouses, repaired during the 1640s, Coventry was described as being the best-defended city in England outside London.
Cowbridge town wall	Cowbridge, Vale of Glamorgan		Substantial		
Cricklade town wall	Cricklade, Wiltshire		Fragmentary		
	Denbigh, Denbighshire		Substantial		
	Dover, Kent		Nothing above ground		Medieval town walls, probably 14th century in date. No structures survive above ground. Tablets mark the sites of Snar Gate, Cow Gate, and Biggin Gate. During building clearance in 1962, foundations of the town wall were encountered along the south side of Townwall Street.
	Durham, County Durham		Fragmentary		
Exeter city walls	Exeter, Devon		Substantial remains		Exeter's walls survive as a circuit approximately 2.35 kilometres (1.46 mi) long, of which 72% (1,705m) is still visible, some parts up to 2.5 metres (8 ft 2 in) high. Originally built by the Romans in c. 200, there were four gateways which were dismantled in the 18th and 19th centuries. The walls were repaired and rebuilt during the Anglo-Saxon, medieval and Civil War periods and the city was besieged at least twice. Several turrets and bastions in the wall are of uncertain date.
	Gloucester, Gloucestershire	Roman and medieval	Vestiges		Foundations of 11th and 13th century East Gate visible through glass panels in Eastgate Street. Another fragment of Roman wall is visible in the City Museum.
	Great Yarmouth, Norfolk		Substantial		
	Hartlepool, County Durham		Substantial		
	Hastings, East Sussex		Vestiges		
	Haverfordwest, Pembrokeshire		Vestiges		
	Hay-on-Wye, Powys		Vestiges		
	Hereford, Herefordshire		Fragmentary		
	Horncastle, Lincolnshire	c. 300	Fragmentary		Perhaps part of a 4th-century Roman coastal defence system. Remnants of all four walls and a circular bastion survive.
	Ilchester, Somerset		Vestiges		
	Kidwelly, Carmarthenshire		Substantial		
	Kings Lynn, Norfolk		Fragmentary		
Fortifications of Kingston upon Hull	Kingston upon Hull, East Riding of Yorkshire	14th century	Vestiges		Built of brick in the 14th century, with four main gates and up to 30 towers, the walls were maintained until the early 1700s. They were demolished during the building of the docks, beginning in the 1770s.
	Langport, Somerset		Fragmentary		
	Launceston, Cornwall		Substantial		
	Lewes, East Sussex		Vestiges		
	Lincoln, Lincolnshire		Fragmentary		
London Wall	London		Fragmentary		Built by the Romans and maintained until the 18th century, nearly 3 mi (4.8 km) long, the wall defined the boundaries of the City of London with the Thames to the south. Short sections remain near the Tower of London and in the Barbican area.
	Ludlow, Shropshire	1233–1317	Fragmentary		Built to defend this Welsh Marches market town, the walls remain in sections, as does the Broad Gate. The large Ludlow Castle is now a ruin but with substantial remains.
	Malmesbury, Wiltshire		Vestiges		
Monmouth town walls and defences	Monmouth, Monmouthshire	13th–15th century	Substantial		Originally formed a circuit wall with four gatehouses, none of which survive. The fortified Monnow bridge still remains, the only surviving medieval bridge gate in the UK.
	Newark-on-Trent, Nottinghamshire		Vestiges		
Newcastle town wall	Newcastle upon Tyne, Tyne and Wear		Substantial		Built during the 13th and 14th centuries the wall was about 2 mi (3.2 km) long, 6.5 ft (2.0 m) thick and 25 ft (7.6 m) high, with six main gates. The town was successfully defended twice; but during the Civil War the wall was breached using mines and artillery.
Norwich city walls	Norwich, Norfolk		Substantial		
	Nottingham, Nottinghamshire	1267-1334	Vestiges		A fragment of the wall is visible in a hotel complex near Chapel Bar.
Oxford city walls	Oxford, Oxfordshire		Fragmentary		
Pembroke town walls	Pembroke, Pembrokeshire	11th - 13th century	Largely intact		The medieval town sits on a limestone peninsular linked to Pembroke Castle (1093) at its western tip. The walls are virtually intact on the north side along the River Pembroke together with Barnard's Tower. 75 percent of the walls survive along the south side. The circuit of the castle and town walls is some 1.5 miles (2.4 km).
	Poole, Dorset		Vestiges		
Fortifications of Portsmouth	Portsmouth, Hampshire	14th–18th century	Fragmentary		First constructed of earth and timber, probably in the late 14th century, the walls were repeatedly repaired and rebuilt until the mid 18th century. They were largely removed in the 1870s and 80s. Part of the 17th century curtain wall survives, consisting of an earth rampart and moat, along with a bastion and redoubt. On the waterfront, there is a 17th-century casemated gun battery and sallyport, and the 15th century Round Tower.
The Bar, Richmond	Richmond, North Yorkshire		Fragmentary		
	Rochester, Kent		Fragmentary		
	Rye, East Sussex		Substantial		
	Salisbury, Wiltshire	14/15th century	Substantial	North Gate Salisbury 2 (5690859348)	North Gate. Two-storey building over and around north entrance to the Cathedral Close.
	Sandwich, Kent		Fragmentary		
Scarborough Town Wall	Scarborough, North Yorkshire	15th century	Fragmentory		Two small sections of wall survive.
	Shrewsbury, Shropshire	13th–14th century	Fragmentary		Begun in the 13th century after attacks by the Welsh, adding to the natural defences of the Severn, the walls were strengthened by the Royalists during the Civil War. A medieval watch tower and short sections remain, notably along the street named Town Walls.
	Calleva Atrebatum, Silchester, Hampshire	3rd century	Substantial		The Roman town of Calleva Atrebatum was abandoned around the 5th or 6th century. Much of the walls survive, the area within them largely farmland.
Southampton town walls	Southampton, Hampshire		Substantial		Built after French raids in 1338, the walls were 1.25 mi (2.01 km) long, with 29 towers and 8 gates. They were amongst the first in England to have new technology installed to existing fortifications, with new towers built specifically to house cannon.
	Stafford, Staffordshire		Vestiges		
	Stamford, Lincolnshire		Fragmentary		
	Swansea		Vestiges		
Tenby town walls	Tenby, Pembrokeshire		Substantial		
	Totnes, Devon	14th century	Fragmentary		Remains include the Baste Walls, South Street and the Eastgate, which was greatly altered in the 19th century.
	Verulamium, near St Albans, Hertfordshire	2nd-3rd century	Fragmentary		The site of the Roman town of Verulamium was abandoned when the later settlement of St. Albans was established nearby. Parts of the wall survive up to a height of 4 metres, together with the foundations of two bastions and the remains of the London Gate in Verulamium Park off King Harry Lane.
	Warkworth, Northumberland		Fragmentary		
	Wareham, Dorset	9th-11th century	Substantial		Earthwork defences first mentioned in 876 surround the town on the north, east and west sides; the south side is bounded by the River Frome. The West Walls were scarped against attack by tanks in 1940.
	Warwick, Warwickshire		Fragmentary		
	Winchelsea, East Sussex		Substantial		
Winchester city walls	Winchester, Hampshire		Substantial		
Worcester city walls	Worcester, Worcestershire	1st–12th century	Vestiges		First built by the Romans, the walls were extended by the Anglo-Saxons to create a walled burh. A longer circuit of stone walls was built in the late 12th century and further fortified during the Civil War.
York city walls	York, North Yorkshire	3rd–14th century	Largely intact		2.5 mi (4.0 km) long, enclosing an area of 263 acres (106 ha), the defences are the best preserved in England. On high ramparts, retaining all their main gateways, the walls incorporate Roman, Norman and medieval work with modern renovations.

== See also ==
- List of town defences in Scotland
- List of cities with defensive walls

== Bibliography ==
- Baker, Nigel and Richard Holt. (2004) Urban Growth and the Medieval Church: Gloucester and Worcester. Aldershot, UK: Ashgate. ISBN 978-0-7546-0266-8.
- Baker, Nigel, Hal Dalwood, Richard Holt, Charles Mundy and Gary Taylor. (1992) "From Roman to medieval Worcester: development and planning in the Anglo-Saxon city," Antiquity Vol. 66, pp. 65–74.
- Bradley, John and Märit Gaimster. (2004) (eds) "Medieval Britain and Ireland in 2003," Medieval Archaeology Vol. 48 pp. 229–350.
- Clarke, Stephen and Jane Bray. (2003) "The Norman town defences of Abergavenny," Medieval Archaeology Vol. 27, pp. 186–189.
- Creighton, Oliver Hamilton and Robert Higham. (2005) Medieval Town Walls: an Archaeology and Social History of Urban Defence. Stroud, UK: Tempus. ISBN 978-0-7524-1445-4.
- Forster, R. H. (1907) "The Walls of Berwick-upon-Tweed," Journal of the British Archaeological Association, Vol. 13, pp. 89–104.
- Hearnshaw, F. J. C. (1924) Newcastle-upon-Tyne. London: Sheldon Press. OCLC 609308241
- Kissack, Keith. (1974) Mediaeval Monmouth. Monmouth: Monmouth Historical and Educational Trust.
- Lilley, Keith D. (2010) "The Landscapes of Edward's New Towns: Their Planning and Design," in Williams and Kenyon (eds) (2010).
- Mackenzie, James D. (1896) The Castles of England: Their Story and Structure, Vol II. New York: Macmillan. OCLC 504892038.
- Patterson, B. H. (1985) A Military Heritage A history of Portsmouth and Portsea Town Fortifications. Fort Cumberland & Portsmouth Militaria Society.
- Pettifer, Adrian. (2000) Welsh Castles: a Guide by Counties. Woodbridge, UK: Boydell Press. ISBN 978-0-85115-778-8.
- Pettifer, Adrian. (2002) English Castles: a Guide by Counties. Woodbridge, UK: Boydell Press. ISBN 978-0-85115-782-5.
- Pevsner, Nikolaus and David Neave. (1995) Yorkshire: York and the East Riding, 2nd ed. London: Penguin. ISBN 0-14-071061-2
- Taylor, Arnold. (2008) Caernarfon Castle and Town Walls. Cardiff: Cadw. ISBN 978-1-85760-209-8.
- Turner, Hilary. (1971) Town Defences in England and Wales. London: John Baker. OCLC 463160092
- Ward, Simon. (2009) Chester: A History. Chichester, UK: Phillimore. ISBN 978-1-86077-499-7.
- Williams, Diane M. and John R. Kenyon. (eds) (2010) The Impact of the Edwardian Castles in Wales. Oxford: Oxbow Books. ISBN 978-1-84217-380-0.
- Wilson, Barbara and Frances Mee. (2005) The City Walls and Castles of York: The Pictorial Evidence, York Archaeological Trust. ISBN 978-1-874454-36-6.
