= Pembroke Power Station =

Gas fired power station in Pembrokeshire, Wales

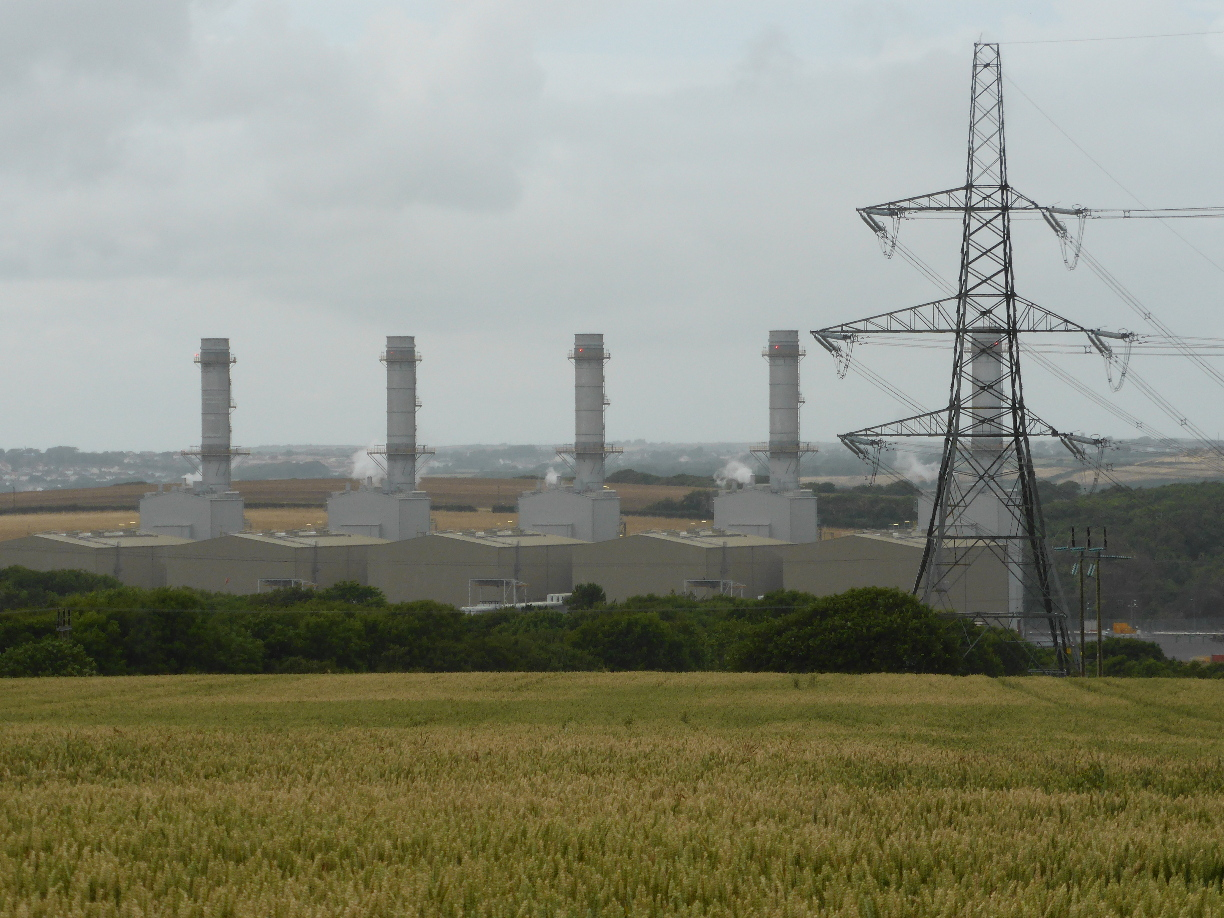
- Pembroke Power Station
- Country: Wales, United Kingdom
- Location: Pembroke, Pembrokeshire
- Coordinates: 51.68311°N 4.98842°W
- Status: Operational
- Construction began: 2008
- Commission date: 2012
- Construction cost: £800 million
- Owner: RWE AG
- Operator: RWE Generation UK

Thermal power station
- Primary fuel: Natural gas
- Combined cycle?: Yes

Power generation
- Units operational: 5 x 400 MWe
- Make and model: Alstom
- Nameplate capacity: 2,000 MW

External links
- Commons: Related media on Commons

Pembroke Power Station is a 2,200 MWe natural gas-fired power station near Pembroke in Wales. The power station was officially opened in September 2012. It is the largest gas-fired power station in the UK and the second largest in Europe, by generating capacity, as of 2021. It is also the largest power station to be built in the UK since Drax power station came online in 1986. Pembroke Power Station currently generates enough power to supply 3.5 million homes and businesses. It is operated by RWE Generation UK.

It is a CCGT-type power station that uses natural gas. There are five 400 MW modules, each with a 288 MWe Alstom gas turbine, heat recovery steam generator and steam turbine.

== Oil-fired predecessor ==
From 1968 until 2000, a CEGB 2,000 MW oil-fired Hinton Heavies power station existed on the site of the current power station. The station had four 500 MW turbo-alternators. The boilers delivered 1,788 kg/s of steam to the turbines at 158.6 bar and 541 °C. Sea water was used for station cooling. There were 3 × 25 MW auxiliary gas turbine electricity generators on the Pembroke site, these were first commissioned in November 1969.

=== Capacity and output ===
The generating capacity, electricity output, load factor and thermal efficiency were as shown in the table.

Year	Net capability, MW	Electricity supplied, GWh	Load as percent of capability, %	Thermal efficiency, %
1972	1360	1767.782	36.1	34.35
1979	2000	9538.811	57.3	34.77
1981	2000	4467.597	26.8	34.07
1982	2000	3632.022	21.8	36.43
1984	1900	1984.997	11.9	35.34
1985	1900	11,249.903	67.6	38.42
1986	1900	1203.964	7.2	33.84
1987	1900	1443.907	8.7	35.01

Electricity supply data, in GWh

The high output in 1984/5 was associated with the 1984/5 Miners' Strike, and the shortage of coal for coal-fired power stations.

The performance data for the gas turbine generators is summarised in the following table.

Year	Net capability, MW	Electricity supplied, GWh	Load as percent of capability, %	Thermal efficiency, %
1972	50	26.317	6.0	22.24
1979	100	9.643	1.1	19.60
1981	100	0.127	–	–
1982	100	1.073	0.1	10.07
1984	100	0.0	–	–
1985	100	29.9	3.4	22.38
1986	100	2.083	0.2	15.70
1987	100	2.577	0.3	17.52

The plant was mothballed by National Power in 1996 when the company proposed to use the controversial fuel Orimulsion. The company changed its mind in the face of fierce opposition and the plant closed in 1997 with the loss of 300 jobs.

National Power put the site up for sale in July 2000. Demolition of the old power station began in 2000 and was completed by 2003. National Power first proposed a CCGT power plant on the site in 1997. This plan lasted until it chose to build Staythorpe instead.

A former member of staff, and his spouse through washing asbestos laden overalls, later died in 2012 and 2022 from mesothelioma as a result of negligence at the plant between 1969 and 1982. Their family received compensation through legal action.

== CCGT power plant ==
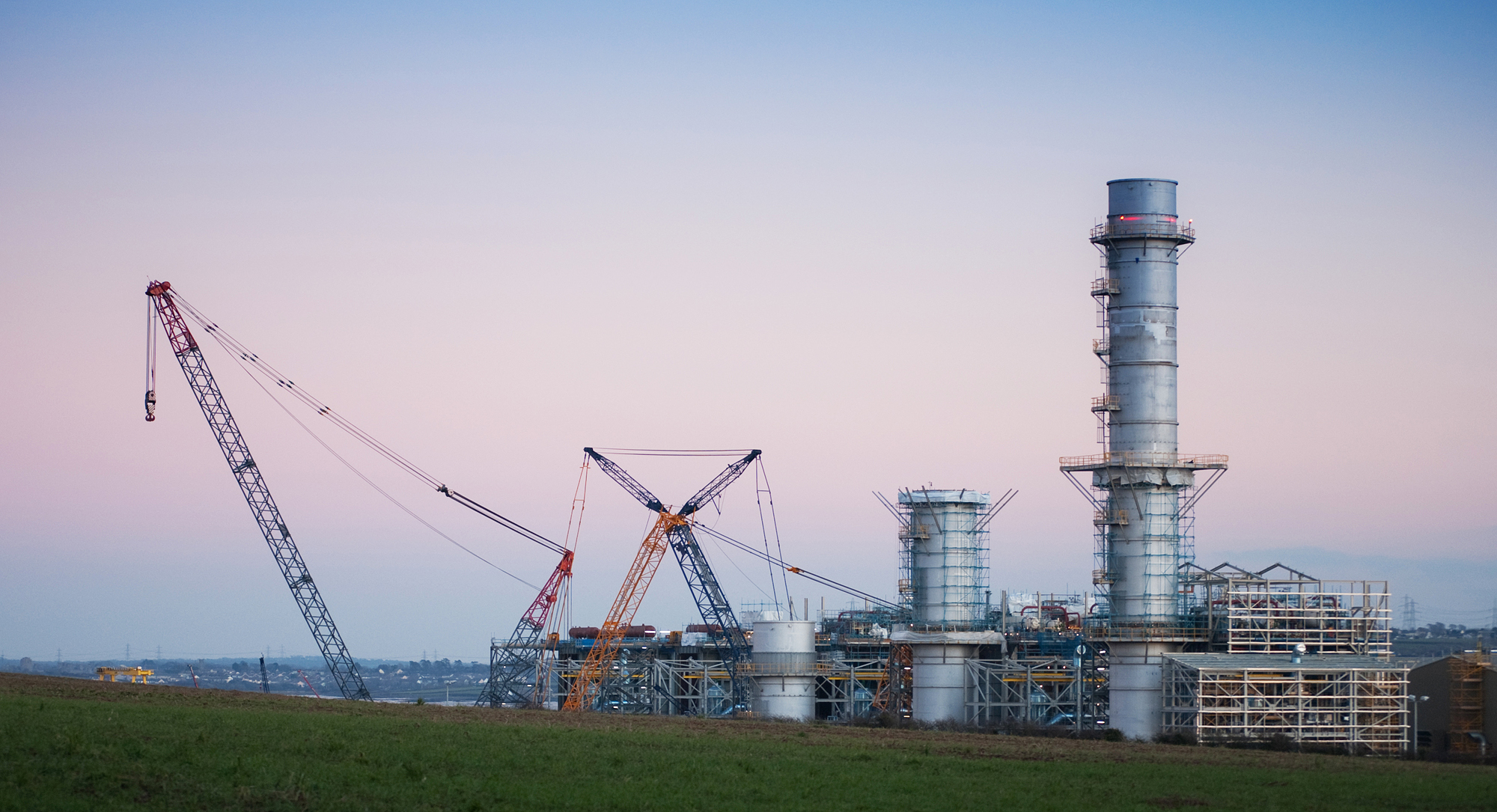
Pembroke Power Station under construction in January 2011

In 2005, RWE (formerly National Power) revived plans to build a CCGT power station at Pembroke when proposals for LNG terminals at Milford Haven brought high pressure natural gas infrastructure to the area. A public exhibition was held in Pembroke Town Hall in February 2005, outlining the proposal to build the £800 million power station in support of the company's planning application. The contractor was Alstom. The ATEX inspection was conducted by the French notified body LCIE. Construction began in 2008 and was completed by mid-2012. The power station employs around 100 people.

During the construction of the power station a contractual dispute broke out between the main contractor Alstom Power and one of its mechanical subcontractors, Somi. The dispute eventually led to Somi leaving the project leaving dozens of local subcontractors and suppliers unpaid. The local newspaper gave detailed coverage of the matter and the local MP attempted to raise awareness of the issue by mentioning it in Parliament but with little success.

Alstom took on most (if not all) of the local subcontractors and paid all wages due and has since won its case against Somi in a high court judgement.

=== Environmental concerns ===
In December 2012, the European Commission sent a notice of infringement to the British government. The notice lists 18 separate violations of four EU laws regarding the plant's cooling system. The EU commission has requested that the British government prove the new power station's cooling system does not adversely affect marine wildlife in the Milford Haven waterway.
