= Peter Bishop (disambiguation) =

Peter Bishop is a fictional character from the American TV series Fringe.

Peter Bishop may also refer to:

- Peter Bishop (priest) (born 1946), British Anglican priest
- Peter Bishop (artist), English painter
- Peter C. Bishop (born 1944), American futurist and author
- Peter Orlebar Bishop (1917–2012), Australian neurophysiologist
- Pete Bishop, musician with The Bishops
- Peter Bishop (captain)
