= Pembroke town walls =

Defensive structure in Pembrokeshire, Wales

- Pembroke, Pembrokeshire
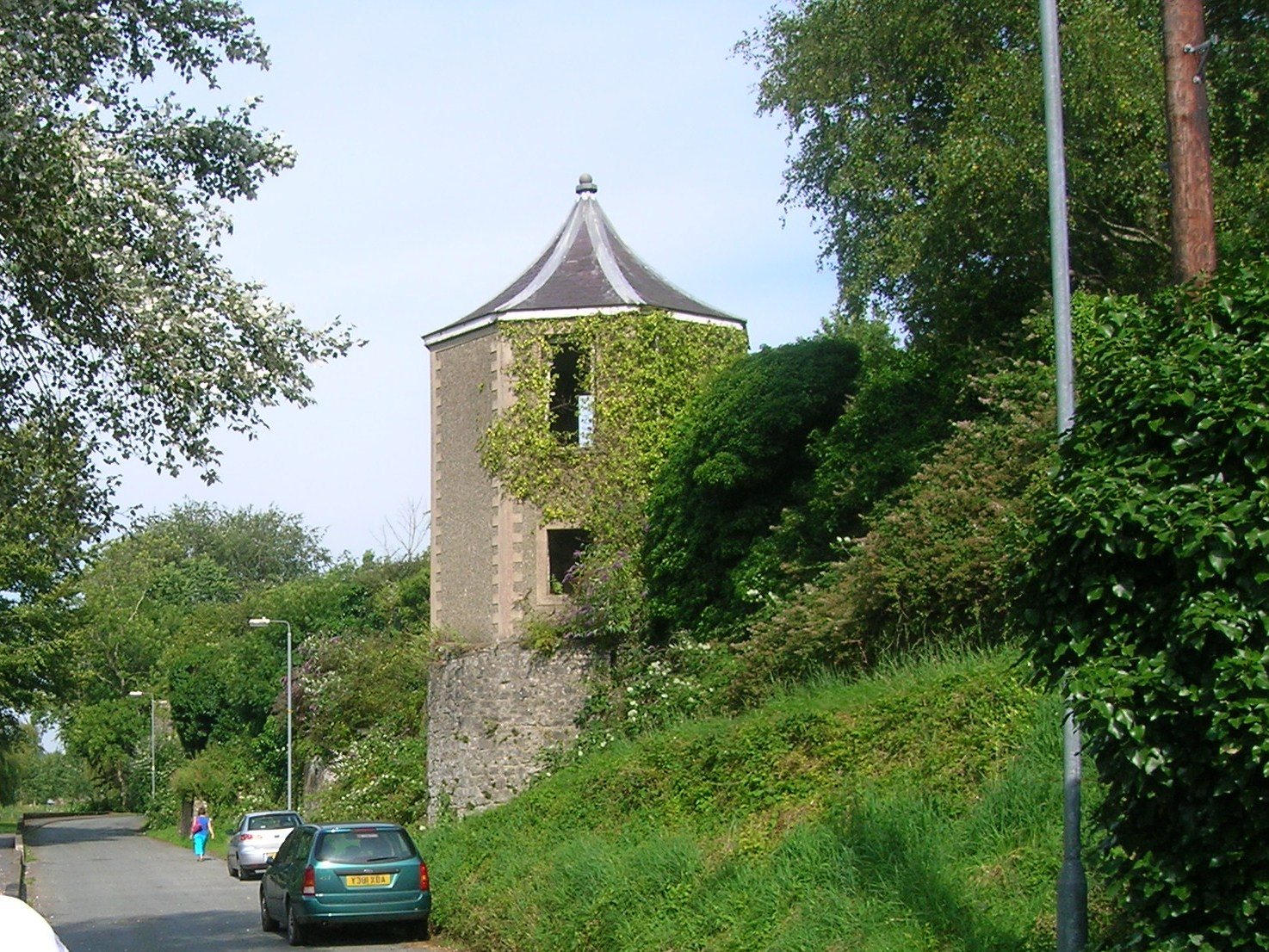
- The Gazebo Tower before the recent restoration

Site information
- Type: Town wall
- Open to the public: Yes

Location
- Shown within Wales
- Coordinates: 51.6733°N 4.9107°W
- Grid reference: grid reference SM9859501400

Site history
- Materials: Rubble stone

Listed Building – Grade II*

Pembroke's town walls are a Grade II*-listed medieval defensive structure around the town of Pembroke, Pembrokeshire, Wales. They were probably built beginning in the late 13th century by the Earls of Pembroke, although it is uncertain when they were finished. Most of the walls have not survived, but there are visible sections and two bastions exist, one with a restored late 18th-century gazebo atop it.

== History ==
The construction of the town walls by William de Valence, 1st Earl of Pembroke, probably began after the outer ward of Pembroke Castle was completed about 1280 as they tie into the castle's wall. They probably replaced a timber palisade and/or earthen rampart that protected the town, most likely at the narrowest point of the peninsula upon which the town is built. Construction was likely continued by his son Aymer (1296–1324), but the walls may not have been completed as there is a 1377 commission that the constable of the castle was charged to 'survey, repair, and fortify the castle and town of Pembroke'.

A century later, money was allocated for 'making a stone wall on the south side of the town of Pembroke' in 1479–80, but this may be interpreted as a repair or rebuild of the existing wall, completion of a missing section of wall or the strengthening of the wall, as was done with the Tenby town walls at about the same time by Jasper Tudor, Duke of Bedford.

== Description ==
The town walls, built of limestone rubble, had three gates, of which only fragments survive of the West Gate. The surviving portion of the walls is on the south side of town and extends some 225 metres (246 yd) from No. 5 Common Road to Rock Terrace. Much of the town wall has been incorporated or rebuilt into more recent structures.

== See also ==
- List of town walls in England and Wales

== Bibliography ==
- Edwards, Emily Hewlett (1909). Castles and Strongholds of Pembrokeshire. Tenby: J.E. Arnett, The Library.
- Pembroke Design and Cambria Archaeology (2001). Pembroke Town Walls Project. Pembrokeshire County Council. Archived from the original on 23 April 2016.
