= David Gwynne-James =

Welsh cricketer, British Army officer, and military historian

Personal information
- Full name: David John Gwynne-James
- Born: 12 June 1937; Pembroke, Pembrokeshire, Wales
- Died: 11 November 2011 (aged 74); London, England
- Batting: Right-handed
- Bowling: Right-arm medium-fast

Career statistics
Competition	First-class
Matches	1
Runs scored	40
Batting average	20.00
100s/50s	0/0
Top score	29
Catches/stumpings	0/–
- Source: Cricinfo, 25 December 2018

David John Gwynne-James (12 June 1937 − 11 November 2011) was a Welsh first-class cricketer, British Army officer and military historian. He served in the British Army during the Mau Mau Uprising and in Aden before secondment to the Sultanate of Muscat and Oman. He returned to the UK and served with the British Army of the Rhine and with the 28th Commonwealth Infantry Brigade in Malaysia before retiring as a captain in 1970. Thereafter Gwynne-James had a long career at Ernst & Young and in management consultancy. A keen sportsman he played cricket for the Free Foresters and British Army teams and rugby for Harlequin F.C. and Kenya Harlequin F.C.

== Early life and military career ==
Gwynne-James was born at Pembroke, Pembrokeshire, to Brigadier J Gwynne-James DSO, and later educated at Cheltenham College. He was regarded as an outstanding cricketer playing in the college's first team for four years and captaining it for two. He also played in the college's rugby team for three years and its hockey team for two.

From Cheltenham Gwynne-James attended the Royal Military Academy Sandhurst and was commissioned as a second lieutenant in the King's Shropshire Light Infantry (KSLI) on 2 August 1957. He commanded a platoon of the regiment's 1st battalion on active service in the Mau Mau Uprising and briefly in Aden during the Aden Emergency. Gwynne-James was promoted to the rank of lieutenant on 2 August 1959 and afterwards served as commander of the unit's mortar platoon at the Colchester Garrison and in Munich with the British Army of the Rhine (BAOR). He was afterwards appointed adjutant of the regiment's depot at Shrewsbury and then of its 4th battalion (Territorial Army). Gywnne-James was seconded to the Sultanate of Muscat and Oman, a British protectorate, in 1962. He served as second-in-command of a rifle company of the Muscat Regiment at Ibri and Rustaq before becoming a training officer at Ghalla.

Gwynne-James was promoted to captain on 2 August 1963. He returned to the 1st battalion of the KSLI in 1965 as adjutant in postings at Portsmouth and Singapore. Gywnne-James was given command of the unit's Training Company and then C Company during deployment to Terendak in Malaysia as part of the 28th Commonwealth Infantry Brigade. He returned to the UK in 1968 and transferred to The Light Infantry when the KSLI was amalgamated that same year. He joined the staff at Sandhurst as an instructor and Light Infantry representative. Gwynne-James was appointed commander of the academy's Dettingen Company before he retired from the army on 1 September 1970.

== Sporting career ==
Gwynne-James played a single first-class cricket match for the Free Foresters against Oxford University at Oxford in 1961. Batting twice in the match, he scored 29 runs in the Free Foresters' first-innings, before being dismissed by Colin Drybrough, while in their second-innings he was dismissed by the same bowler for 11 runs. Gwynne-James was a keen sportsman and represented the 1st Battalion KSLI in cricket, rugby, hockey, squash, skiing and athletics. He played for the British Army cricket team for five seasons between 1959 and 1968 and captained them in 1961 and 1962. He also played for the Combined Services cricket team. He played rugby for Harlequin F.C. in 1959 and 1960 as a fly-half and also with their affiliates Kenya Harlequin F.C. whilst on deployment. Gywnne-James was also a climber, having climbed the Matterhorn in 1963, and led at least one of the KSLI's mountaineering expeditions.

== Later life ==
When Gwynne-James left the army he worked at Ernst & Young for around twenty years, first as director of estate management then director of administration and finally as director of personnel. From 1991 to 2004 he was managing director of his own management consultancy (Gwynne-James Associates). He also lectured in business management, served as a mentor for the Prince's Trust and as president of the Essex Playing Fields Association. Gwynne-James administered the KSLI plot at the Westminster Abbey field of remembrance and attended numerous KSLI and Light Infantry reunions.

Gwynne-James wrote a number of books documenting his experiences serving in the army and his family's service in the military. He was staying in London to attend the 2011 Remembrance Sunday commemorations when he suffered a heart attack, the resulting collapse from which caused a catastrophic head injury. He was pronounced dead two days later on Remembrance Day. In the moments following his heart attack he was the victim of a robbery, with the perpetrators taking his bank card and using it to withdraw £1,400, as well as stealing his glasses and watch. Gwynne-James was married to Charmian with whom he had two daughters.
