= Emma Leslie =

English writer (1838–1909)

Emma Boultwood
- Born: 1838; Greenwich, Kent, England
- Died: 1909 (aged 71); Pembroke, Wales
- Occupation: Writer
- Spouse: Thomas Francis Dixon (m. 1873)
- Children: 2
- Writing career
- Pen name: Emma Leslie
- Genres: Children's and historical books

Emma Leslie was the pseudonym of Emma Boultwood (1838–1909), an English writer of children's books and historical fiction. She wrote more than one hundred books.

== Early life ==
Emma Boultwood was born in 1838 in Greenwich in north-west Kent, the daughter of Thomas Boultwood, a bootmaker. For a time she worked as a governess. She started writing in the 1860s, publishing children's and historical fiction for the Religious Tract Society and the Sunday School Union. Her younger sister, Harriet Boultwood, also became a novelist, and wrote dozens of books for religious publishers.

== Personal life ==
In 1873 Boultwood married Thomas Francis Dixon, and they had two sons.

Though a longtime resident of Lewisham, in 1909 Boultwood Dixon died in Pembroke, Wales, and is buried there.

== Selected bibliography ==
- The Captives (1873)
- Hayslope Grange: A Tale of the Civil War (1873)
- Charley's Log: A Story of Schoolboy's Life (1882)
- A Sailor's Lass (1886)
- Kate's Ordeal (1887)
- The Seed She Sowed: A Tale of the Great Dock Strike (1891)
- Eric, a Waif: A Story of Last Century (1892)
- Brave Bessie Westland: A Story of Quaker Persecution (1893)
- A Gypsy Against Her Will: or, Worth Her Weight in Gold (1893)
- Elsie's Scholarship, and Why She Surrendered it (1898)
- At the Sign of the Golden Fleece: A Story of Reformation Days (1900)
- That Scholarship Boy (1900)
- Arthur's Inheritance: or, How He Conquered (1901)
- Brought Out of Peril (1906)
- Saved by Love: A Story of London Streets (1913)
