= Alnwick town walls =

Defensive walls built around Alnwick, England

- Alnwick, Northumberland
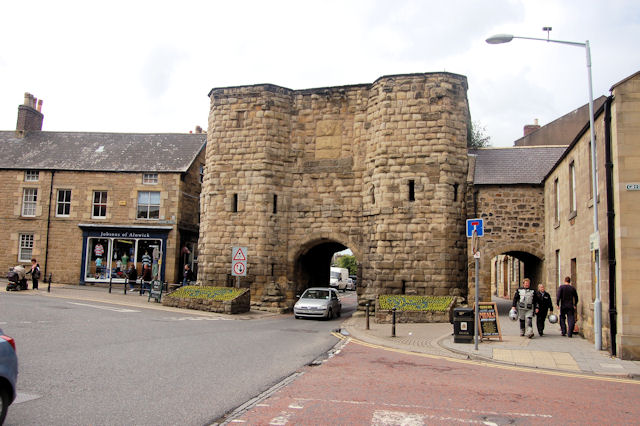
- The Bondgate Tower, displaying the Percy lion

Site information
- Type: City wall

Location
- Shown within Northumberland
- Coordinates: 55.4123°N 1.703°W
- Grid reference: grid reference NU188132

Alnwick's town walls are a 15th-century defensive structure built around the town of Alnwick in England.

== History ==
Alnwick's town walls were built in the 15th century following a period of considerable border instability and raiding that had caused significant damage to Alnwick's economy. Henry VI permitted the town to charge murage on selected imports to Alnwick in 1434 and, using these taxes, protective walls with four gates were built in stone over a period of around fifty years. The local Percy family controlled the neighbouring Alnwick Castle and the Bondgate Tower was decorated with their lion crest - an unusual feature for town gates of this period which normally celebrated civic, rather than local noble, identities.

The surviving sections include the 15th century Bondgate Tower and Pottergate (which was rebuilt in the 18th century). Both are scheduled monuments and Grade I listed buildings.

== See also ==
- List of town walls in England and Wales

== Bibliography ==
- Creighton, Oliver Hamilton and Robert Higham. (2005) Medieval Town Walls: an Archaeology and Social History of Urban Defence. Stroud, UK: Tempus. ISBN 978-0-7524-1445-4.
- Pettifer, Adrian. (2002) English Castles: a Guide by Counties. Woodbridge, UK: Boydell Press. ISBN 978-0-85115-782-5.
