= Peter Bishop (artist) =

English painter (1953–2022)

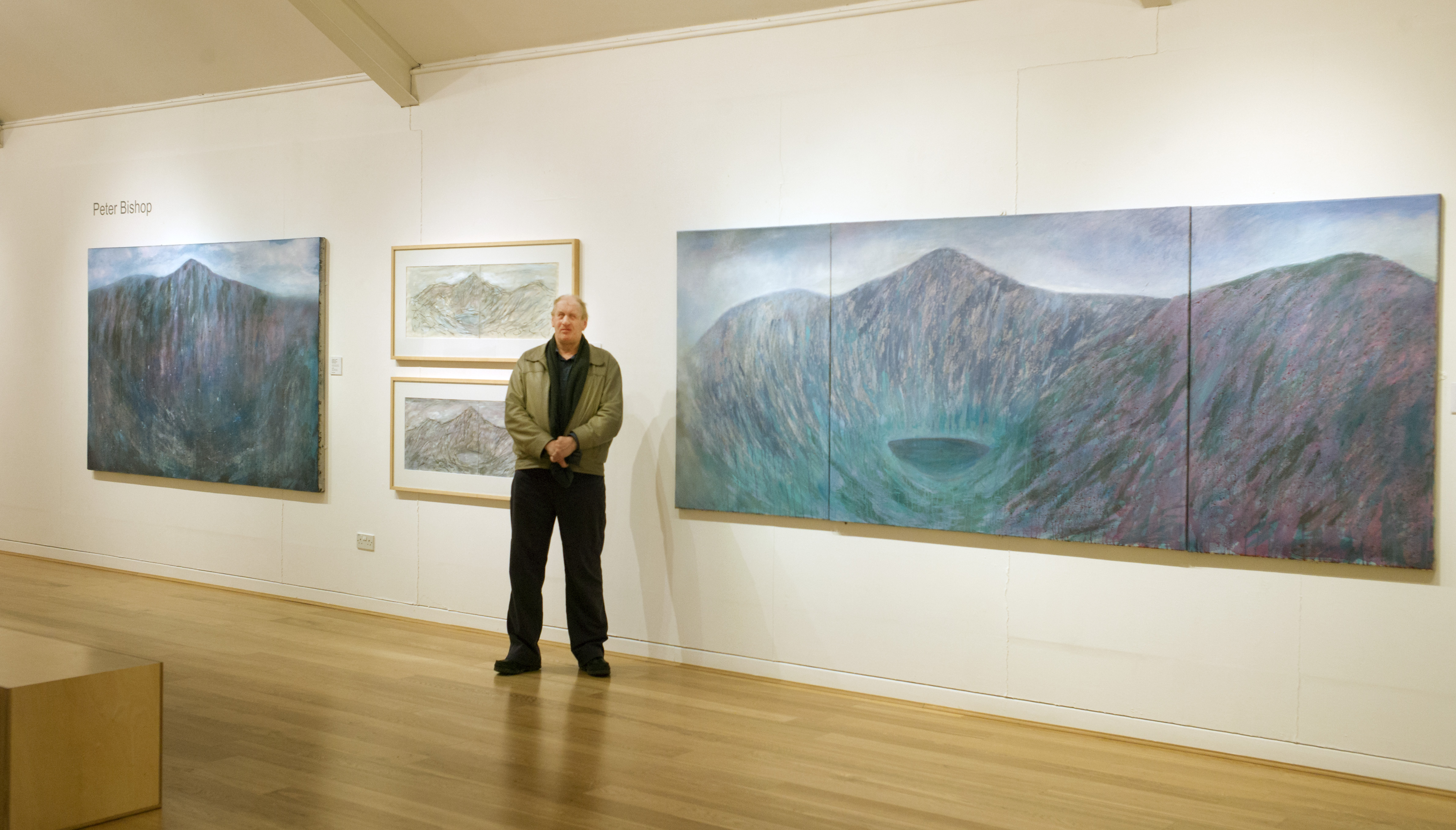
- Bishop with Cader triptych, Oriel Ynys Mon 2017
- Born: 1953; Pembroke, Wales, United Kingdom
- Died: 2022 (aged 68–69)
- Education: Sibford School, Oxfordshire (1964-1970) Banbury School of Art, Oxfordshire (1970-1972) Slade School of Fine Art, University College London (1972-1975) Institute of Education, University of London (1976-1977) Birmingham Institute of Art and Design (1992-1995) Slade School of Fine Art, University College London (1996-1998) School of Art, Aberystwyth University (1998-2001)
- Occupation: Painter
- Website: https://www.peterbishoppaintings.com/

Peter Bishop (1953 – 2022) was an English painter specialising in the mountain landscape of north Wales and was an art historian.

His book, The Mountains of Snowdonia in Art was published by Gwasg Carreg Gwalch in 2015.

== Early life and education ==
Born in Pembroke, Peter Bishop was educated at Sibford School in Oxfordshire from 1964 to 1970. He did a two-year foundation course in art and design at Banbury and Bicester College from 1970 to 1972, then studied painting at the Slade School of Fine Art from 1972 to 1975 under Professor William Coldstream’s tenure. Tutors included Bernard Cohen and Rita Donagh. His degree show included Alpine landscape and pen and ink drawings of mountains, influenced by the writings and visual examples of John Ruskin. Later the same year he held his first solo exhibition of Alpine paintings at the Amwell Gallery, London. From 1976 to 1977 he studied art education at the Institute of Education, University of London.

In 1983 he moved to live near Ludlow in south Shropshire. From 1985 to 2003 he was a lecturer in fine art at Shrewsbury College of Arts and Technology. He was also a visiting lecturer in art history at Birmingham University and a visiting tutor in painting at the University of Wolverhampton School of Art.

In 1995 he obtained an MA with distinction in the history of art from the Birmingham Institute of Art and Design. In 1996 he returned to the Slade to study fine art on the PhD programme, whose tutors included Bernard Cohen (fine art) and David Bindman (history of art). After two years at the Slade he transferred to Aberystwyth University School of Art where he was supervised by Professor Alistair Crawford, obtaining his PhD in 2001.

== Artistic career ==
The Alpine series of paintings continued until 1987, supplemented by landscape views of the high hills of Shropshire and the Malvern Hills. After a solo exhibition at the Hereford Museum and Art Gallery in 1987 the artist decided to concentrate on the mountains of Snowdonia as his main subject. Also in 1987 he joined the Kilvert Gallery in Clyro near Hay on Wye, at the invitation of its director Elizabeth Organ. The gallery represented the artist until it closed in 2009.

Peter Bishop has been invited to participate in many group exhibitions including London's Royal Academy of Arts Summer Shows and has held ten solo exhibitions, the most recent at MOMA Wales in 2012. His work is in public and private collections. In an Arts Review, Anthony Vettise wrote 'What is very striking is the searching quality of this artist's working process, one senses the struggle to find solutions through trial and error, the building of marks and colour and the reworking of ideas. Ultimately he searches for pictorial equivalents of personal experience of his chosen landscape. The experience is romantic in its vision of grandeur of space and immensity of nature.'

In 2016 the artist co-curated the exhibition ‘In Snowdonia’ at Storiel, Bangor. In October 2016 he was invited to give the annual Thomas Pennant Society lecture at Holywell. He is also an invited speaker and consultant on art in Snowdonia to various audiences. In March 2018 he became the Honorary President of the Ludlow Art Society.

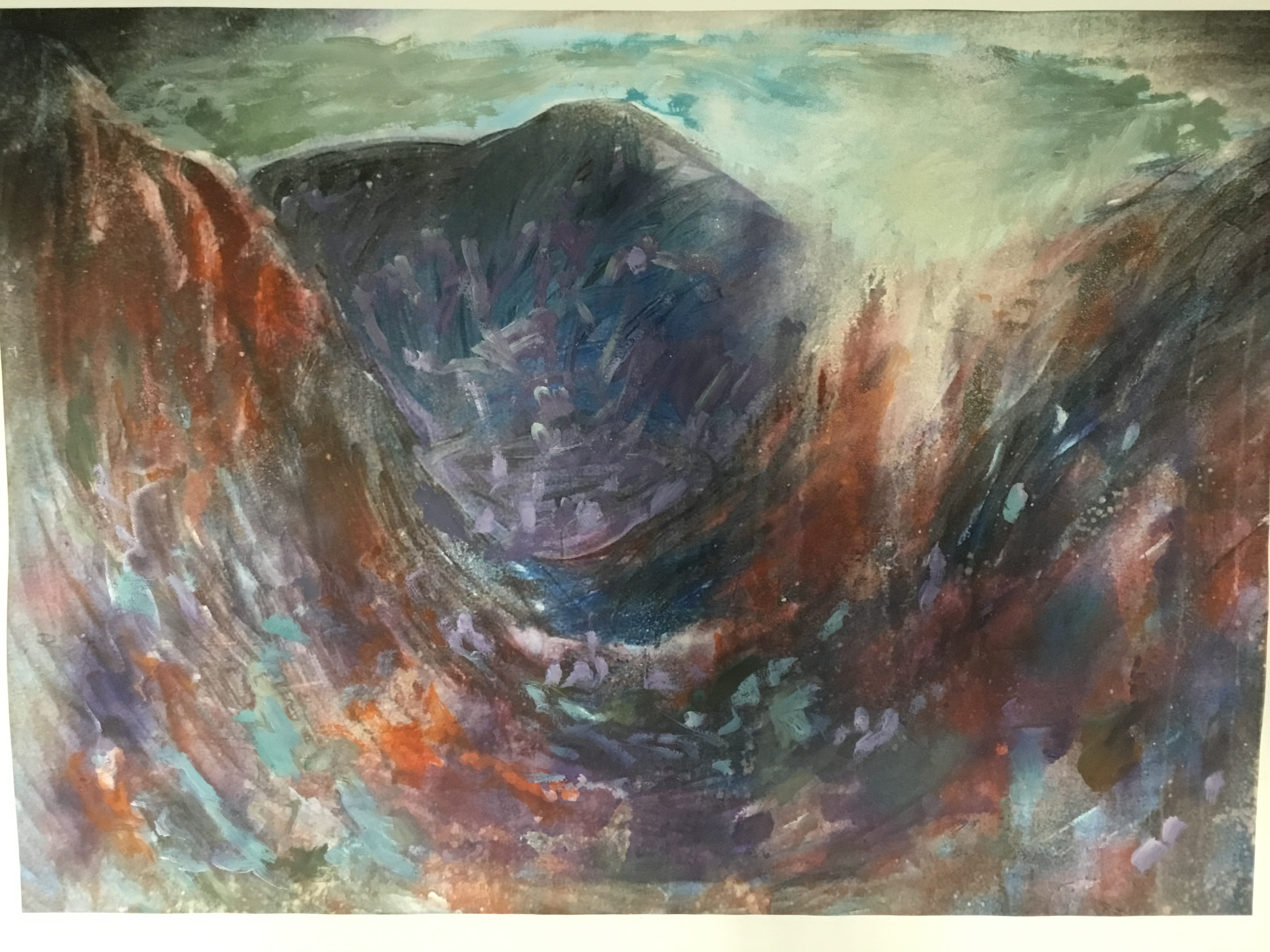
Snowdon from above Nantlle, 2021

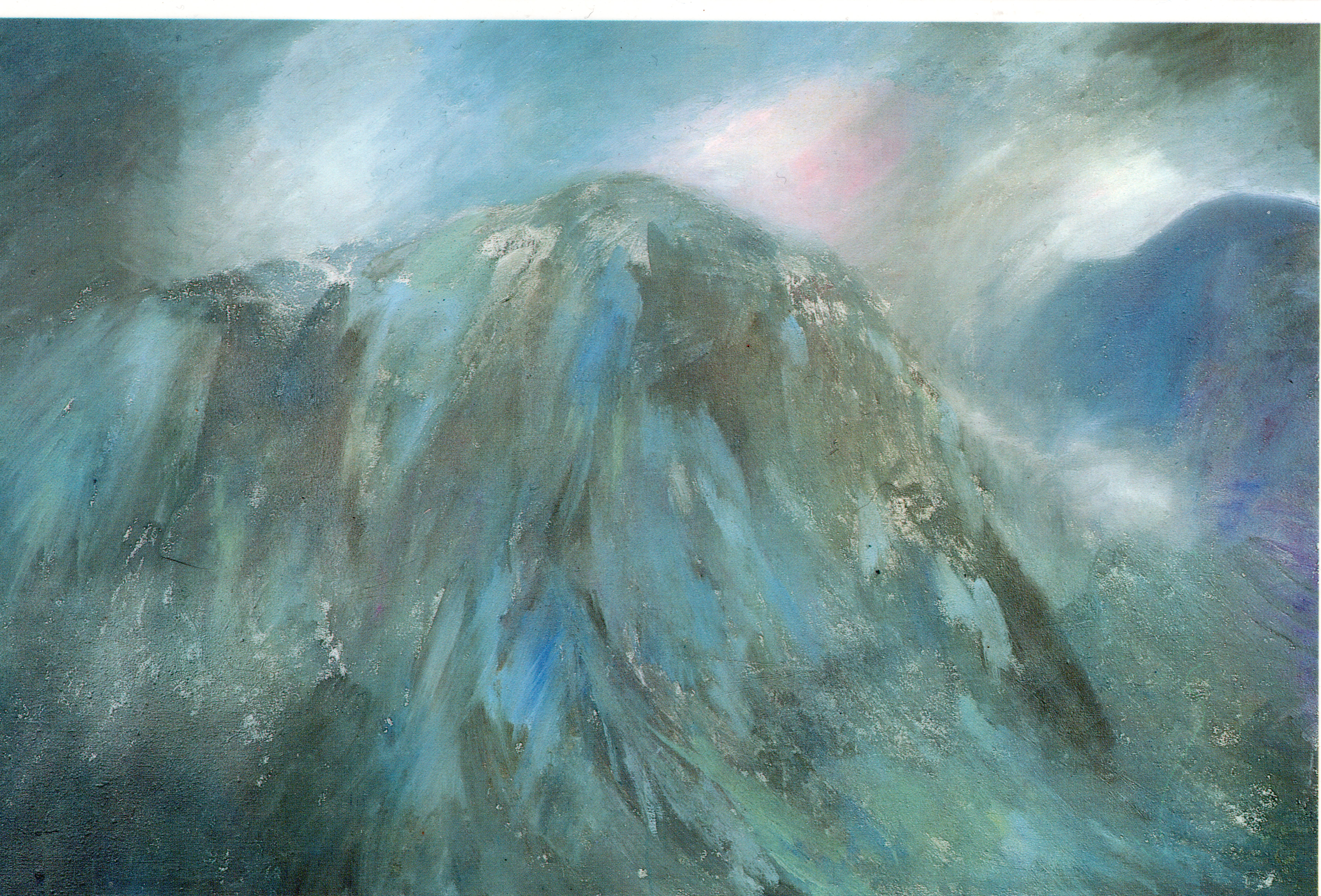
Cader Idris (Craig Cau), 1992

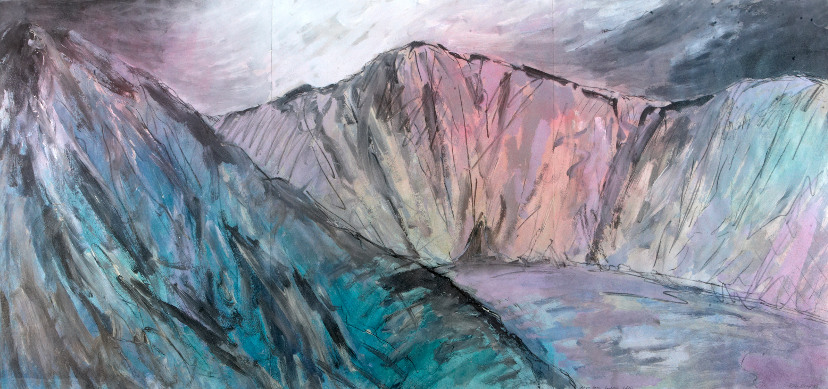
Llyn y Cau, Cader Idris, 1996

== Personal life ==
Peter was married to Jenny Beaumont and they had two daughters. His death from pneumonia at the age of 68 was announced on 18 July 2022.

== Solo exhibitions ==
- 1975 Alpine Landscapes, Amwell Gallery, London
- 1979 Reality Re-Explored, Amwell Gallery, London,
- 1982 Oxfordshire Landscapes, Prescote Gallery, Cropredy, Oxfordshire,
- 1987 Landscape Paintings, Hereford Museum and Art Gallery
- 1989 Peter Bishop Paintings, The Gateway Art Centre, Shrewsbury
- 1991 Welsh Landscapes, The Kilvert Gallery, Clyro
- 1993 Snowdonia, The Gateway Art Centre, Shrewsbury.
- 1998 Cader Idris – Sublime Prospects, Burford House Gallery, Worcestershire
- 2003 On Cader Idris, Gallery 3, Gateway Art Centre, Shrewsbury
- 2012 Peter Bishop – Cader Idris, Museum of Modern Art, Machynlleth, Wales

== Selected group exhibitions ==
- 1977–1983 Zella 9 Chelsea (silkscreen prints)
- 1987–2008 mixed exhibitions, Kilvert Gallery, Clyro
- 1991 Contemporary Art Fair, London
- 1991/92 British Art Fair, Royal College of Art, London
- 1993/95 Welsh Contemporary Art Fair, Cardiff
- 1994 Laing Landscape Exhibition, Birmingham
- 1995/98 Eagle Works Studio Gallery, Wolverhampton
- 1997/98/04 Royal Academy Summer Exhibition, London
- 2001 Landscape 2000, Burford House Gallery, Worcestershire
- 2001 Cader Idris, Royal Cambrian Academy, Conwy
- 2001 Art 4 Amnesty, Shrewsbury Museum & Art Gallery
- 2001 Cader Idris, National Library of Wales, Aberystwyth
- 2008 Aberystwyth University School of Art Centenary Exhibition
- 2013 Ludlow Open, Ludlow, Shropshire
- 2013 Hereford Open (prize winner), Hereford Museum and Art Gallery
- 2016 Soul of Wales, MOMA Machynlleth
- 2016 Curious Travellers: Movement, Landscape, Art, Oriel Sycharth, Glyndwr University
- 2016–17 In Snowdonia, Storiel, Bangor, north Wales
- 2017 Curious Travellers, Movement, Landscape, Art, Oriel Brondanw, Llanfrothen
- 2017 Tabernacle Collection MOMA Machynlleth
- 2017 Impressions of Wales, Oriel Ynys Mon, Anglesey

== Public collections ==
- University of London (commission)
- Institute of Education, University of London
- Hereford Museum and Art Gallery
- National Library of Wales (2 works)
- Tabernacle collection, MOMA Machynlleth (2 works)

== Writings and publications by Peter Bishop ==
- Peter Bishop – Cader Idris, exhibition catalogue with 33 colour plates, includes essays: Of Mountains and Memories by Dr. Pete Davis and Cader Idris – Wilson's View by Dr. Peter Bishop Pub. Peter Bishop & MOMA Wales 2012, ISBN 978-0-9571788-0-9
- Peter Bishop, The Mountains of Snowdonia in Art: The Visualisation of Mountain Scenery from the mid-Eighteenth Century to the Present Day. Pub. Gwasg Carreg Gwalch, 2015. ISBN 978-1-84524-227-5

== Articles ==
- Contributed to BBC News feature: Snowdonia: Where dreams are hatched and challenges met. 19 April 2017
- Campaign for National Parks, Snowdonia: ‘Cader Idris: Wilson’s View’, Published online, 19 April 2018
- Campaign for National Parks, Snowdonia: 'Pont Aberglaslyn: a picturesque landscape', Published online, 15 October 2018
- Campaign for National Parks, Snowdonia: 'Snowdon From Capel Curig: A Classical Viewpoint', Published online, 18 March 2019
- The British Art Journal XIX, 3: 'Thomas Pennant (1726–98): The Journey to Snowdon and its influence on artists visiting North Wales', Published 26 March 2019, pp. 87–95
- Campaign for National Parks, Snowdonia: 'Llyn Idwal: A Sublime Viewpoint', Published online, 17 October 2019
- Campaign for National Parks, Snowdonia: ‘Snowdon: Wilson’s View’, Published online, 10 February 2020

== Bibliography ==
- Margaret Hawes, Oxford Mail, 22 September 1977
- Julia Lacey, Arts Review, 11 May 1979, p. 204
- Anthony Vettise, Arts Review, 4 October 1991, p. 506, colour plate p. 507.
- Madeline Marsh (ed) Miller's Picture Price Guide, 1994, colour plate p. 73.
- Barbara Rae (ed) Royal Academy Illustrated, 1998, colour plate p. 50.
- ‘Art for Amnesty’ Living etc., May 2001, text and colour plate p. 22.
- Paul Joyner, Cader Idris, exhibition catalogue, National Library of Wales, 2001, p. 3.
- Jo King (ed) Ludlow Open: Rural Showcase for Contemporary Art, 2013, text and colour plate p. 15
- ‘In Snowdonia’ exhibition catalogue, Storiel, Bangor, 2016, text and colour plate p. 26.
- Mary-Ann Constantine and Elizabeth Edwards, Curious Travellers, Movement Landscape, Art, exhibition catalogue, University of Wales Centre for Advanced Welsh and Celtic Studies, Aberystwyth, 2017, text & colour plate, p. 6, text and colour plate pp. 34–5.
- Robin Simon (ed) The British Art Journal, Volume XXI No. 3, Winter 2020/21, p. 107, Editor's Choice: Peter Bishop, The Mountains of Snowdonia in Art, Gwasg Carreg Gwalch, 2015.
