= Exeter city walls =

Scheduled monument urban defence in England

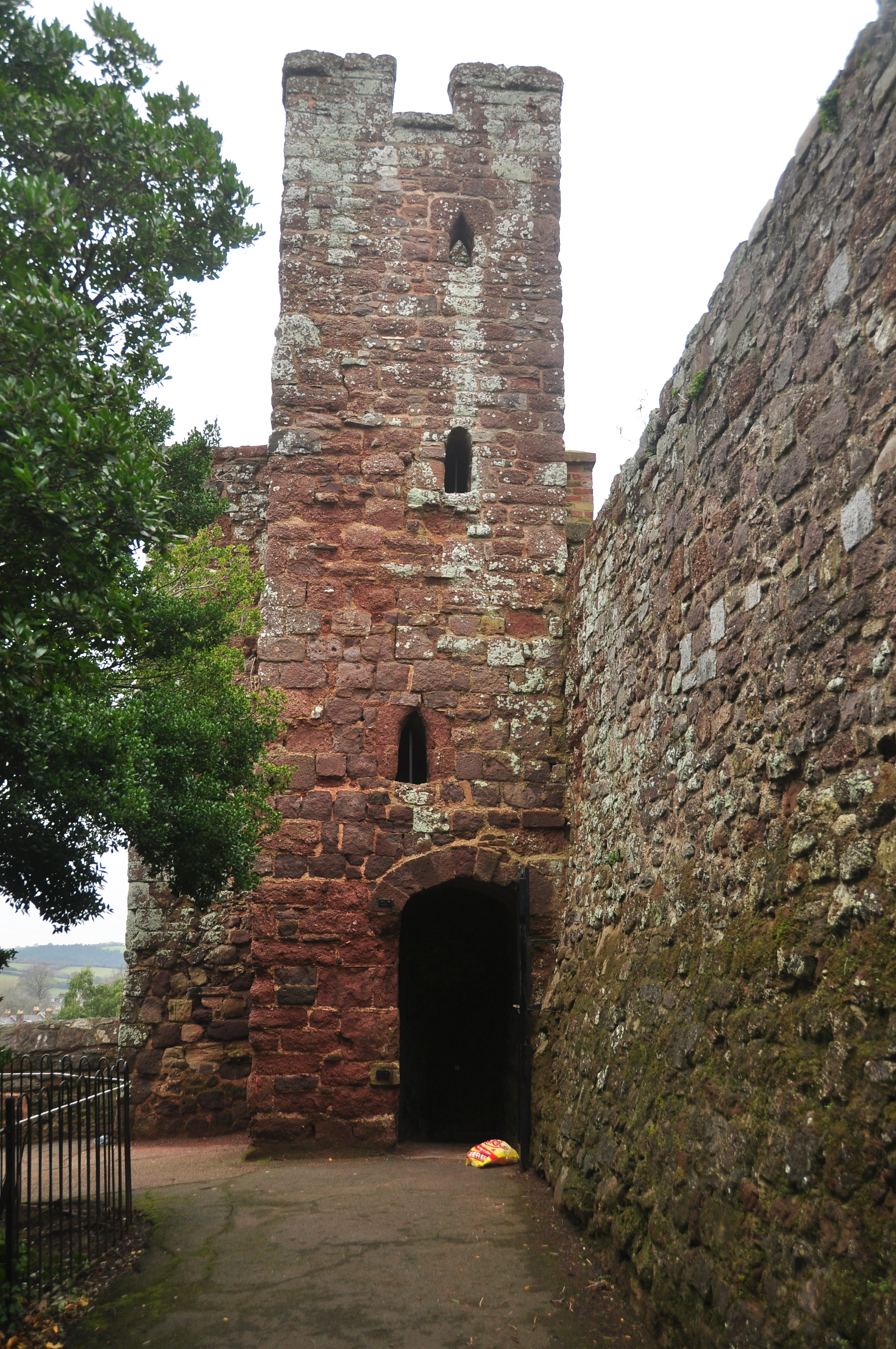
- Athelstan's tower, at part of the city walls
- Interactive map of Exeter city walls
- 50.7224°N 3.53136°W
- Type: Fortification
- Location: Exeter, England

History
- Built: 13th-14th century
- Original use: Urban defence

Site notes
- Area: 2.35 kilometres (1.46 miles)
- Architectural style: Medieval
- Restored: 19th century
- Owner: Exeter City Council

Scheduled monument
- Official name: Roman, Anglo Saxon and medieval defences called collectively Exeter City Walls
- Designated: 2 May 1934
- Reference no.: 1003858

Exeter's city walls survive as a circuit approximately 2.35km long, of which 72% (1,705m) is still visible, some parts up to 2.5m high. The walls of Exeter, England, are a scheduled monument.

== History ==
Originally built by the Romans circa 200 AD, there were four gateways, which were dismantled in the 18th and 19th centuries. The walls were repaired and rebuilt during the Anglo-Saxon, medieval and Civil War periods and the city was besieged at least twice. Several turrets and bastions in the wall are of uncertain date.

William of Malmesbury attributed the walls' construction to Æthelstan, though they certainly had Roman origins. However, the Anglo-Saxon period did see significant repair and strengthening of the walls, as did the medieval period. As a result, the surviving walls today contain a mixture of work from many periods.

== See also ==
- List of town walls in England and Wales
