= Pembroke Town Hall =

Municipal Building in Pembroke, Wales

- Neuadd y Dref Penfro (Welsh)
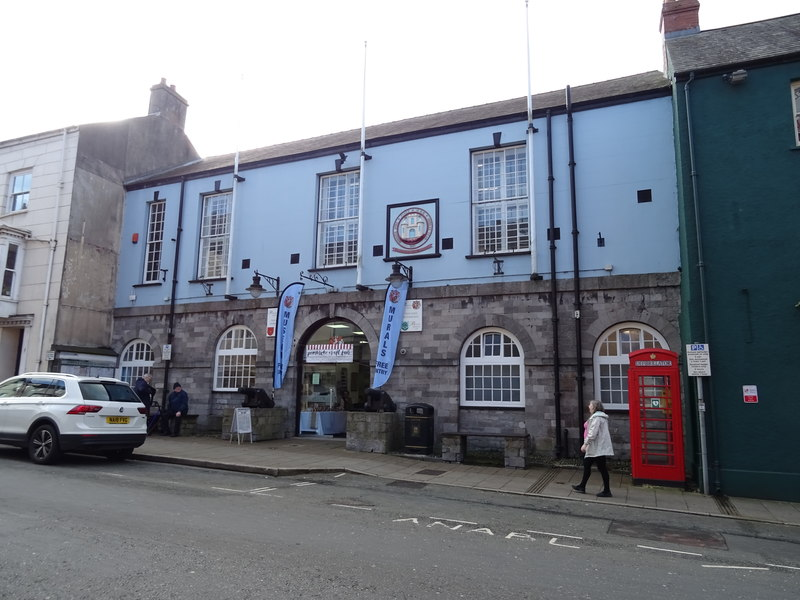
- Pembroke Town Hall

- Shown in Pembrokeshire
- 51.6759°N 4.9177°W
- Location: Main Street, Pembroke

History
- Built: 1819

Site notes
- Architectural style: Neoclassical style

Listed Building – Grade II
- Official name: The Town Hall
- Designated: 3 June 1964
- Reference no.: 6377

Pembroke Town Hall (Welsh: Neuadd y Dref Penfro) is a municipal building in Main Street, Pembroke, Pembrokeshire, Wales. The structure, which is the meeting place of Pembroke Town Council, is a Grade II listed building.

== History ==
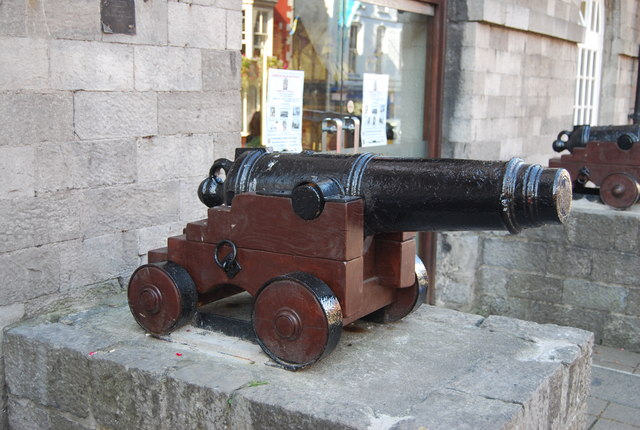
One of the two cannons outside the town hall

The first municipal building in the town was a shire hall on the north side of Main Street which dated back at least to the mid-18th century. The theologian, John Wesley, preached in this building in May 1781. After the shire hall became dilapidated, civic leaders decided to erect a new structure on the south side of the street. The new building was designed in the neoclassical style, built with limestone blocks on the ground floor and ashlar stone with a stucco finish on the first floor and was completed in 1819.

The design involved a symmetrical main frontage with five bays facing onto Main Street. There was a large opening in the central bay and smaller openings in the other bays, all with keystones and voussoirs. On the first floor, there was a narrow sash window with a keystone in the first bay and standard sash windows with keystones in the second, third and fourth bays, while the fifth bay was blind. There was a panel bearing the borough coat of arms between the third and fourth bays. Access to the first floor was by way of an external staircase on the left hand side of the front of the building. Internally, the principal rooms were the corn exchange on the ground floor, and the courtroom and the council chamber on the first floor.

Some important events took place in the town all in the 19th century: in July 1827, after launching the second-rate, HMS Clarence, at Pembroke Dockyard, the Duke of Clarence attended a banquet in the building. Then, in October 1830, a meeting was held in the town hall, at which participants included the Scottish member of parliament, Sir James Mackintosh, to draw up a petition to the UK Parliament to demand the abolition of the slave trade. Then, in September 1880, the suffragette, Helena Downing, visited the town hall and made the case for women's rights, especially in the field of employment.

A new market hall was erected behind the existing structure to a design by a local architect, Kedjewin Ladd, in 1882, and the external staircase was removed in 1909. When the Royal Yacht, HMY Victoria and Albert, which had been built at Pembroke Dockyard, was broken up in 1955, Queen Elizabeth II sent a teak cigarette box made from the ship's timber to the borough council as a gift and it was subsequently placed on display in the town hall.

The borough of Pembroke covered both the old town of Pembroke itself and the neighbouring settlement of Pembroke Dock. By 1895 Pembroke Borough Council had adopted the practice of holding its meetings alternately at Pembroke Town Hall and at 37 Bush Street in Pembroke Dock (renumbered 71 Bush Street in 1906), the latter being the council's main offices where their staff were based. The council remained based at Bush Street until the early 1970s when it acquired Llanion Park, part of the Llanion Barracks at Pembroke Dock, to serve as its headquarters. By this time, Pembroke Town Hall's civic use was limited to ceremonial purposes, including housing the mayor's parlour. Pembroke Borough Council was abolished in 1974, being replaced by South Pembrokeshire District Council. A new Pembroke Town Council was formed, being a lower tier community council, and it adopted Pembroke Town Hall as its meeting place.

A series of 28 murals created by George and Jeanne Lewis, depicting the history of Pembroke from 3,000 BC to the start of the 20th century, were installed on the walls of the foyer of the building between February 2006 and July 2009. A local history museum was established in the former courtroom of the town hall in 2013, and subsequently accumulated a collection which included the complete archive of silent films which were once owned by the cinema proprietor, William Haggar, as well as other local artefacts.
