= Tenby town walls =

Medieval walls in Pembrokeshire, Wales

- Tenby, Pembrokeshire
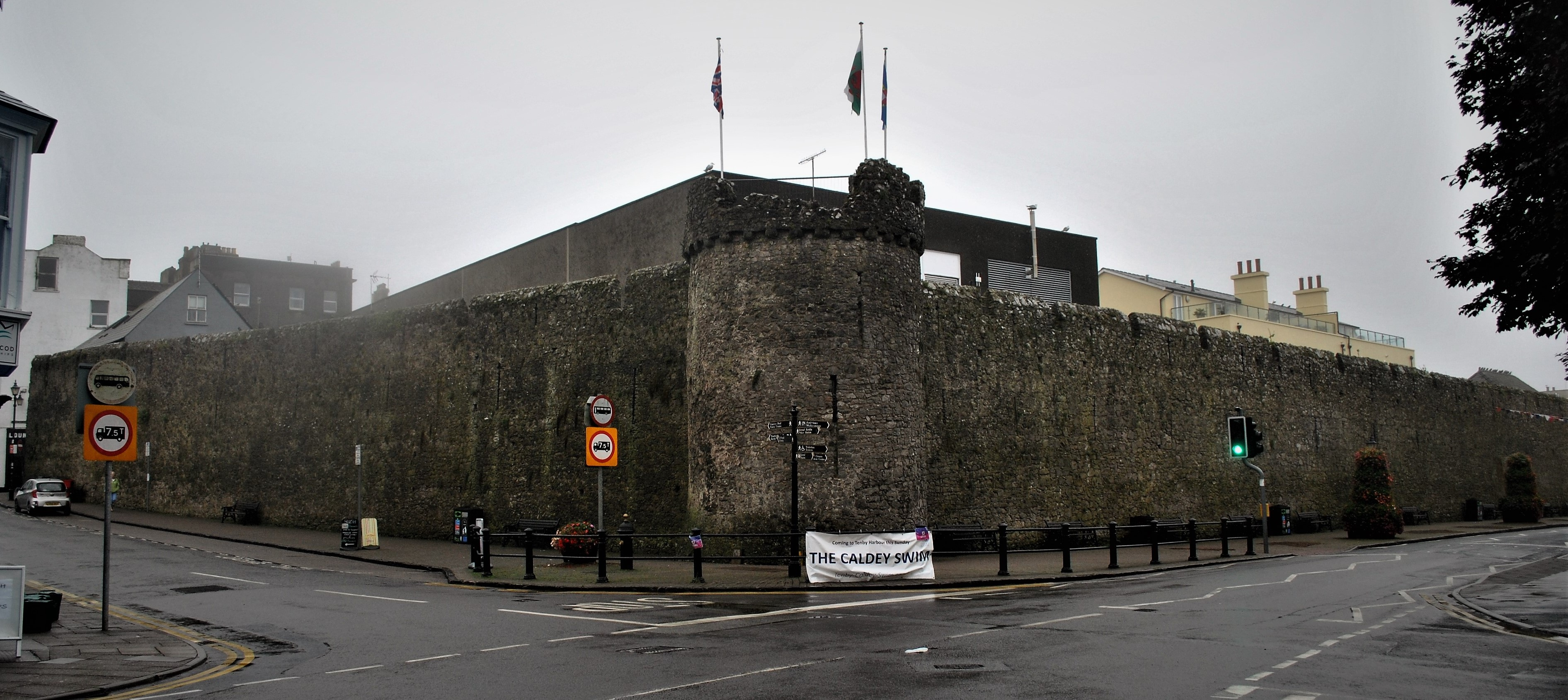
- The north wall (left) and west wall (right) in 2017

Site information
- Type: Town wall
- Open to the public: Yes

Location
- Shown within Wales
- Coordinates: 51.671102°N 4.700714°W
- Grid reference: grid reference SN1334600380

Site history
- Materials: Rubble stone

Listed Building – Grade I
- Reference no.: 26434

The Tenby town walls are Grade I-listed medieval defensive walls around the town of Tenby in Pembrokeshire. They are assessed as one of the most important surviving medieval city walls in Britain. The walls were built in the 13th century by the Earls of Pembroke and improved in the 1450s. They were last known to have been repaired in 1588 and have declined thereafter. Most of the town's gates were demolished beginning in the 18th century and only one survives.

== History ==
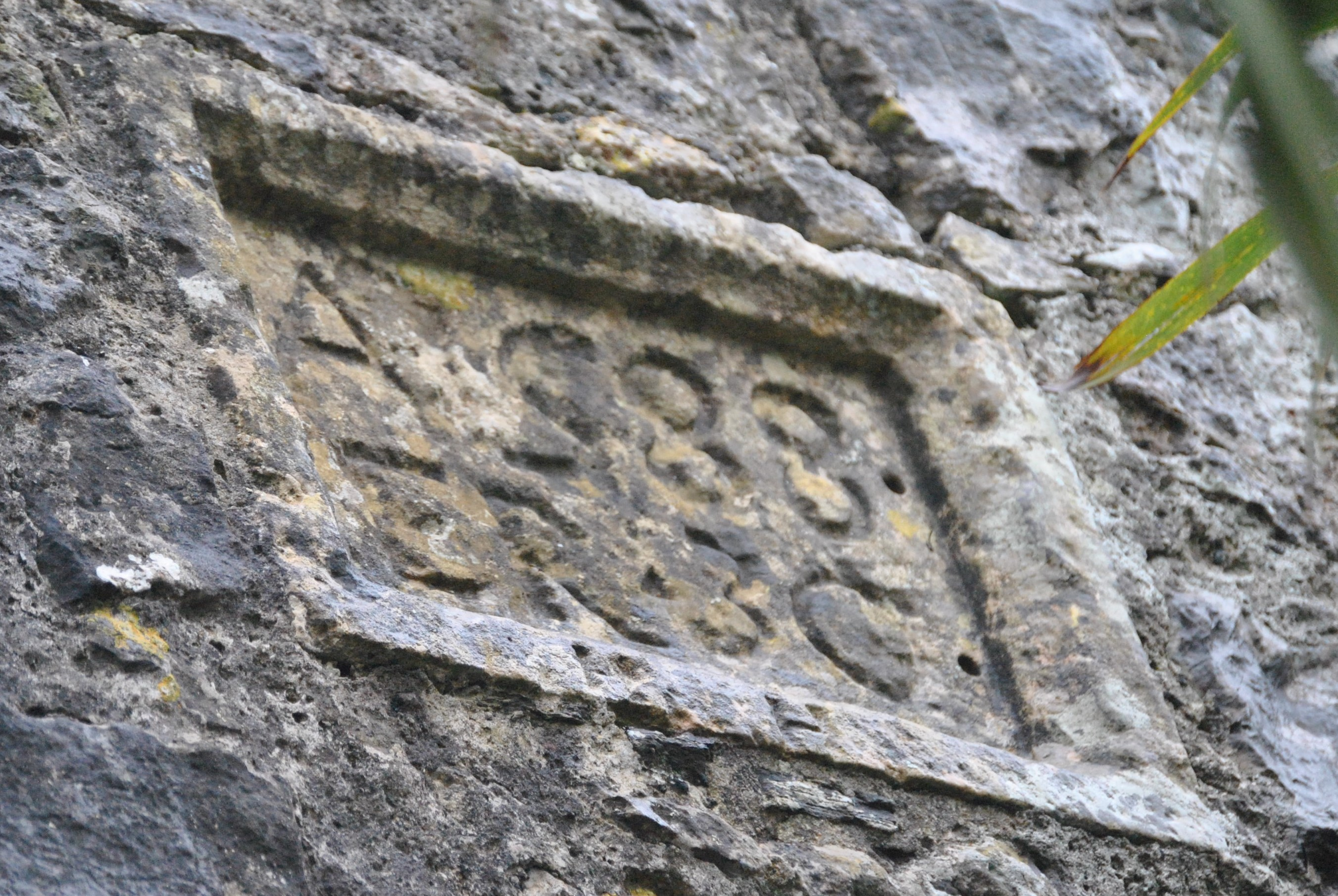
Tablet on the west wall

The Marshal family, Earls of Pembroke to 1245, may have started construction of the walls, replacing an earthen rampart of the late 12th century, and their successor as Earl William de Valence instigated more permanent walls after Tenby was sacked in 1260 by Llewelyn ap Gruffydd.

By the start of the fourteenth century, the walls were mostly completed so diminishing the defensive importance of Tenby Castle. In 1328, they were further strengthened when a D-shaped barbican was built to defend the town's main gate and additional D-shaped towers were later added to the northern and southern walls. Throughout the fourteenth and fifteenth centuries Tenby received various royal grants to finance the maintenance and improvement of the town walls as well as enclosing Tenby harbour.

A later Earl, Jasper Tudor, ordered the walls repaired and improved in 1457. They were raised 5 feet (1.5 m) in height and widened to allow the garrison to move about freely. The moat surrounding the town was also widened to a width of 30 feet (9.1 m). The walls were repaired in 1588; there is a tablet on the wall commemorates the work.

In the mid 16th century, another large D-shaped tower (named the "Five Arches") was built in the Elizabethan period following fears about a second Spanish Armada.

== Description ==
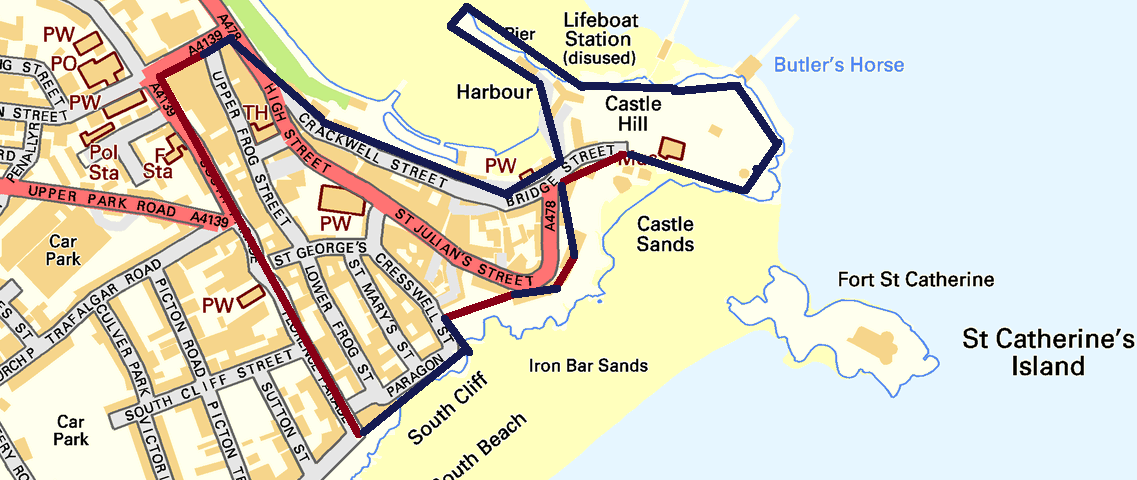
Blue lines show where the walls round Tenby were most likely placed and red lines mark the wall sections that are still standing

There were originally four gates, but the Great or Carmarthen Gate was removed in 1781, the South Gate in 1797 and the Quay Gate in 1811. Only the semi-circular Five Arches Gate survives. Six towers survive, although there may have been up to 24 originally. At one time there were walls connecting the town to Tenby Castle, but they no longer exist. The walls are generally built of rubble stone with arrow loops and a crenellated parapet. There is a short stretch west from Upper Frog Street along White Lion Street to the bastion at the corner of White Lion Street and South Parade and then the most intact portion runs south beside South Parade and St Florence Parade to the sea.

== See also ==
- List of town walls in England and Wales

== Bibliography ==
- Edwards, Emily Hewlett (1909). Castles and Strongholds of Pembrokeshire. Tenby: J.E. Arnett, The Library.
