= Pembroke, Pembrokeshire =

Town and community in Wales

Pembroke: Welsh: Penfro
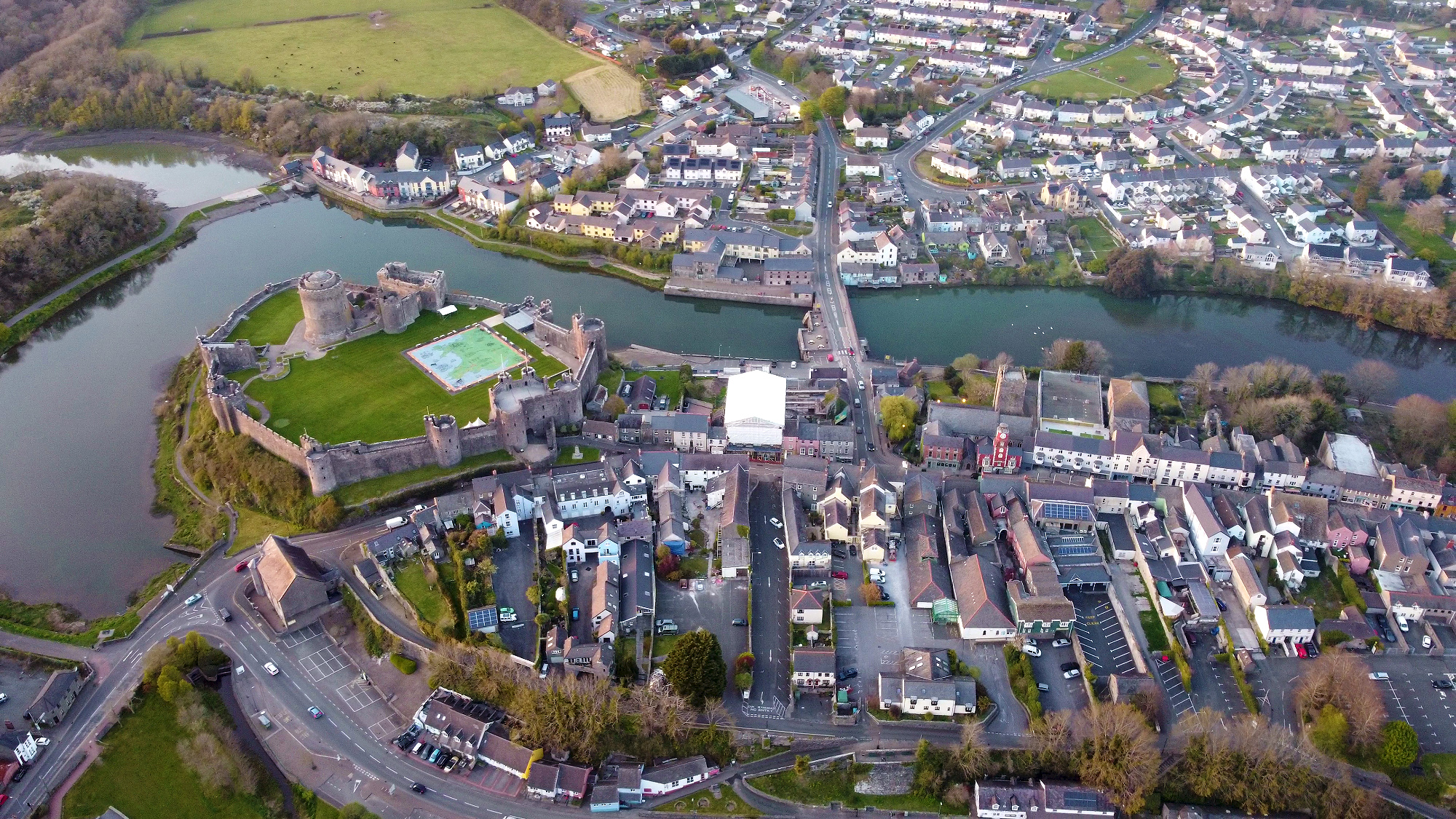
- Aerial view of Pembroke Castle and Main Street

- Location within Pembrokeshire
- Population: 7,552 (2011 census)
- OS grid reference: SM985015
- Community: Pembroke
- Principal area: Pembrokeshire
- Preserved county: Dyfed
- Country: Wales
- Sovereign state: United Kingdom
- Post town: PEMBROKE
- Postcode district: SA71
- Dialling code: 01646
- Police: Dyfed-Powys
- Fire: Mid and West Wales
- Ambulance: Welsh
- UK Parliament: Mid and South Pembrokeshire
- Senedd Cymru – Welsh Parliament: Ceredigion Penfro
- List of places UK Wales Pembrokeshire 51.67604°N 4.9158°W Map of the community

Pembroke (/ˈpɛmbrʊk/ PEM-bruuk; Welsh: Penfro [ˈpɛnvrɔ]) is a town and community in Pembrokeshire, Wales, with a population of 7,552. The names of both the town and the county (of which the county town is Haverfordwest) have a common origin; both are derived from the Cantref of Penfro: Pen, 'head' or 'end', and bro, 'region', 'country', 'land', which has been interpreted to mean either 'Land's End' or 'headland'.

Pembroke features a number of historic buildings, town walls, complexes and Pembroke Castle which was the birthplace of Henry Tudor, who became Henry VII of England.

== History ==
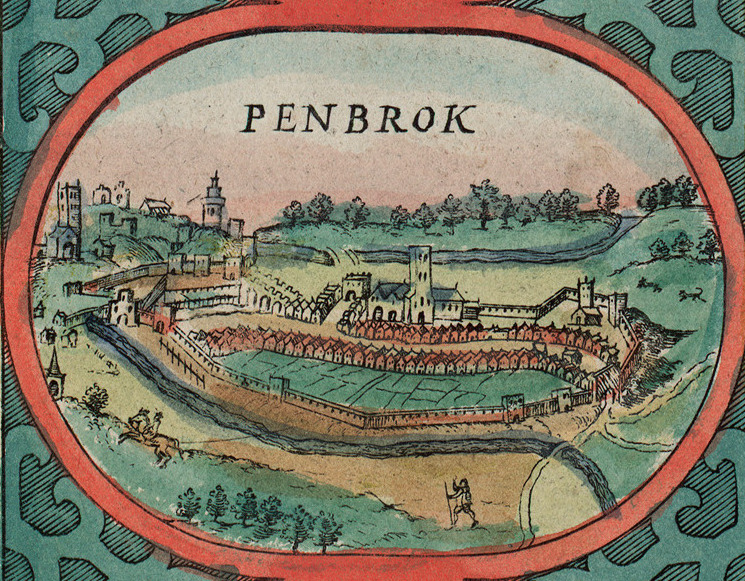
Pembroke, 1610 from Speed's map of Wales

Pembroke Castle, the substantial remains of a stone medieval fortress founded by the Normans in 1093, stands at the western tip of a peninsula surrounded by water on three sides. The castle was the seat of the powerful Earls of Pembroke and the birthplace of King Henry VII of England. Gerald de Windsor was the first recorded Constable of Pembroke. Pembroke town and castle and its surroundings are linked with the early Christian church. Following the final extension of the castle about 1254 the town was extended and defensive perimeter walls erected around the edge of the town. The walls survive on their medieval foundations, although much rebuilt over the centuries. A great many of the town's original medieval burgage plots survive and are divided by early stone walls that are of significant national importance.

Monkton Priory, sited on a hill across the river from the castle, founded in 1098 by Arnulf de Montgomery and granted by him to the Benedictine order, has very early foundations and retains much of the Norman walls of the nave. The choir and sanctuary were renovated in the nineteenth century. Monkton Hall, close by the Priory church, is regarded as the oldest domestic building in Pembrokeshire and possibly Wales and is thought to have been the guesthouse for visitors to the Priory.

The first stone building in the town was a defensive tower, now known as the Medieval Chapel, at 69a Main Street and built on a cliff edge. There are the remains of a great hall to the north and recently filled-in arched cellars. The building was thought to have been later used as an early church as the layout is the same as St. Govan's Chapel and was used by John Wesley in 1764 to preach Methodism. In 1866 it became the brewery for the York Tavern which was briefly Oliver Cromwell's headquarters at the end of the Siege of Pembroke during the English Civil War.

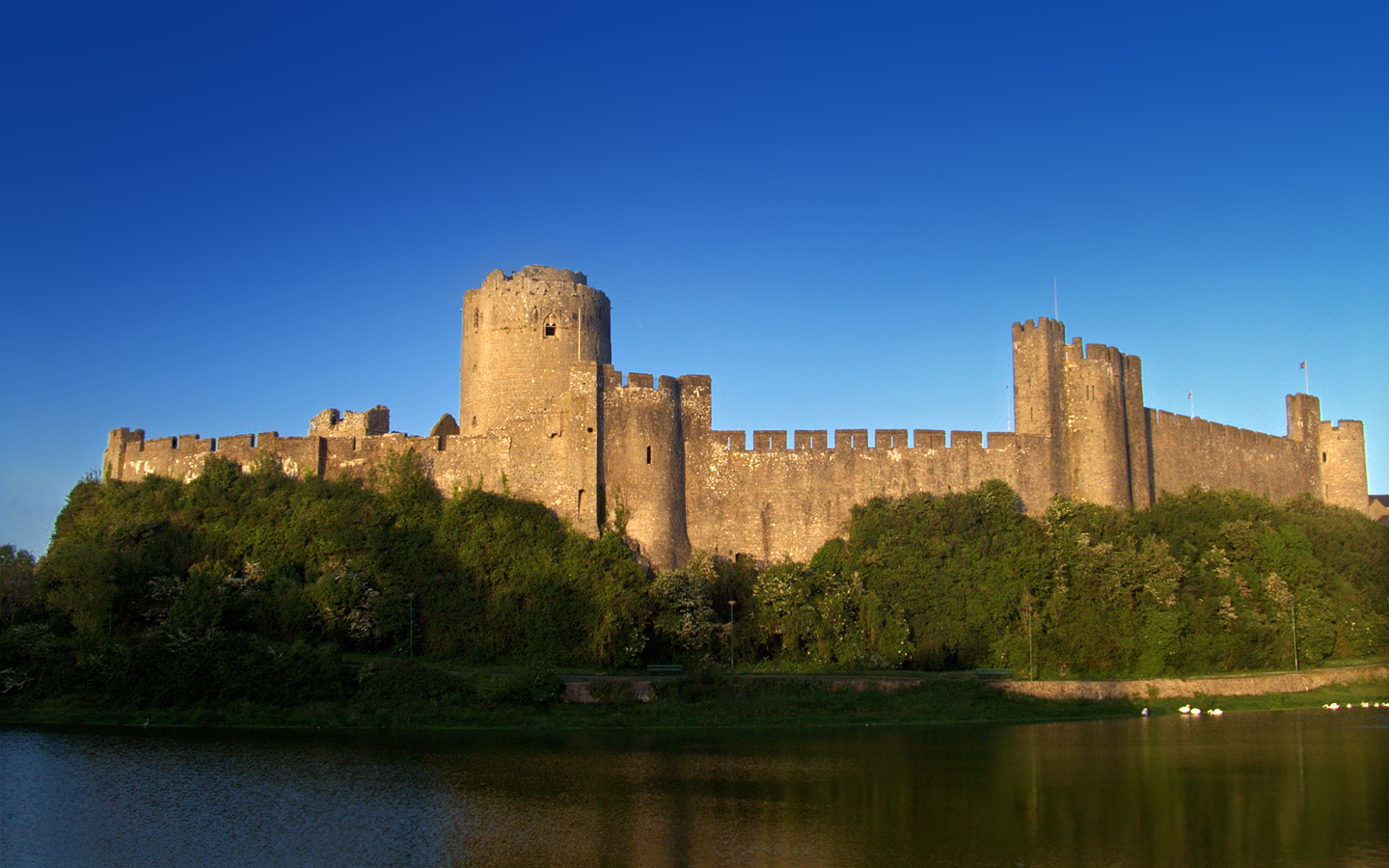
Pembroke Castle and the Pembroke river

The town's main bridge across the River Pembroke, which also acts as a dam, crosses and constrains the millpond. The first bridge was constructed to house a tide mill, originally granted to the Knight's Templar in 1199. The last mill building was destroyed by fire in 1956.

On both banks of the Pembroke River to the west of the castle are many remains of early activities. The North Shore Quarries are relatively complete as are the remains of medieval and Elizabethan slipways where wooden vessels were built before the industrial dockyard and admiralty town was built on the grid pattern of Pembroke Dock. There is a very early complete graving dock in what was Hancock's Yard.

During the English Civil War, the strategic maritime shire was primarily in the control of the parliamentary forces which aspired to prevent communication to Ireland.

At Pennar Flats there was an early submarine base used for experiments in submarine warfare. Three of the houses on the then foreshore, part of the shipyard before the Admiralty Dock Yard was built, are still standing but are heavily altered.

The ferry port of Pembroke Dock is 3 miles (4.8 km) to the northwest of Pembroke. It was established in 1814.

== Geography ==
Pembroke town stands on the South Pembrokeshire limestone peninsula by the estuary of the River Cleddau, flanked on all sides by woodland and arable farmland. The town is 8 miles (13 km) south of the county town of Haverfordwest.

The town is centred on Main Street, which is the only street that is inside the original Pembroke town walls. Outside the walls, residential estates have been built to the north towards Pembroke Dock, to the east towards Lamphey, and to the south. To the west of the town lies the village of Monkton, which is included as part of the community of Pembroke. At the 2001 census, the community had a population of 7,214.

The conurbation of Pembroke Dock and Pembroke has a combined population of 15,890 and as such is one of the major population centres of West Wales.

== Governance ==
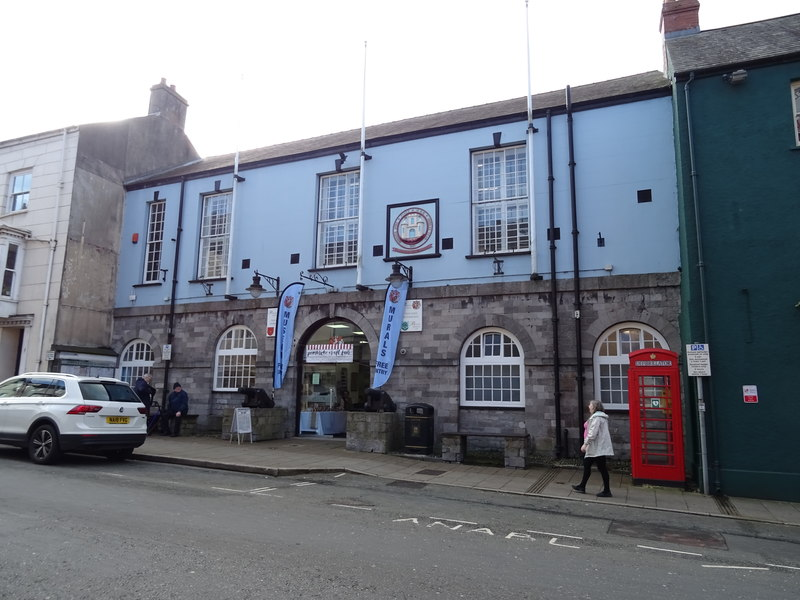
Pembroke Town Hall

=== Local government ===
There are two tiers of local government covering Pembroke, at community (town) and county level: Pembroke Town Council and Pembrokeshire County Council. Pembroke Town Council is based at Pembroke Town Hall. The community of Pembroke covers an area of 4.58 square miles (1,190 ha) and includes the Pembroke St Mary North, St Mary South, St Michael and Monkton wards.

For representation on the county council, the four wards comprising Pembroke community each elect one councillor.

=== Senedd and Westminster representation ===
Pembroke is part of the Carmarthen West and South Pembrokeshire Senedd constituency and the Mid and South Pembrokeshire UK Parliamentary constituency.

The local Member of Parliament (MP) is Henry Tufnell, a member of the Labour Party.

=== Administrative history ===
Pembroke was an ancient borough, with evidence of borough charters dating back to at least 1168. The borough covered the two parishes of Pembroke St Mary and Pembroke St Michael plus part of the parish of Monkton (also known as Pembroke St Nicholas). The borough was reformed to become a municipal borough in 1836. The borough included a sizeable rural area within its boundaries as well as the built up area of Pembroke itself. The town of Pembroke Dock, which developed from the early nineteenth century as a separate urban area was nevertheless within the borough boundaries of Pembroke, falling within the parish of Pembroke St Mary. The part of the parish of Monkton outside the borough boundaries became a separate parish called Hundleton in 1894.

As Pembroke Dock grew through the nineteenth century it began to rival the old town of Pembroke for position as the main settlement within the borough. By 1895 Pembroke Borough Council had adopted the practice of holding its meetings alternately at Pembroke Town Hall and at Pembroke Dock, where the council had established its main administrative offices at 37 Bush Street (renumbered 71 Bush Street in 1906). The council remained based at 71 Bush Street (and later also expanded into neighbouring 73 Bush Street) until the early 1970s when it acquired Llanion Park, part of the Llanion Barracks at Pembroke Dock, to serve as its headquarters.

Pembroke Borough Council was abolished under the Local Government Act 1972, with the area becoming part of the new district of South Pembrokeshire within the county of Dyfed on 1 April 1974. A community was established to cover the area of the former borough, with its council taking the name Pembroke Town Council. South Pembrokeshire District Council took over Llanion Park at Pembroke Dock to serve as its headquarters.

On 1 April 1986 the community of Pembroke was split into a Pembroke Dock community and a reduced Pembroke community, with Pembroke Town Council thereafter just covering the old town of Pembroke itself.

South Pembrokeshire was abolished in 1996, with the area becoming part of a re-established Pembrokeshire.

== Education ==
Primary and pre-school (ages 3–11) education in Pembroke is served by three state schools. In Pembroke town, Golden Grove CP School is an English-medium school established in 2002 as a dual stream school following the amalgamation of Golden Manor Infants School and Grove Junior School. Since 2024, Welsh-medium primary education has been provided by Ysgol Bro Penfro. In Monkton, pupils can attend Monkton Priory CP School.

Secondary education is provided by Henry Tudor School (in Welsh: Ysgol Harri Tudur), a mixed 11–18 comprehensive school of 1,600 pupils with a sixth form of about 200. The school was formed in 1972 as a result of the amalgamation of the former grammar school and secondary modern school. Previously known as Pembroke School, it adopted its current name in September 2018 following the construction of new buildings on the same site and the demolition of the original buildings. The school takes pupils from the Pembroke family of schools, which as well as Golden Grove and Monkton Priory includes community primary schools in Lamphey, Orielton, Pennar and Pembroke Dock, voluntary controlled primary schools in Angle, Cosheston and Stackpole, and St. Mary's Catholic Primary School in Pembroke Dock.

== Culture and community ==
Pembroke 21C community association was founded in 2004, and is based out of the Foundry House building on the Commons, which they operate as a community centre. Activities carried out by 21C include organising the annual Pembroke Festival, running the town's fortnightly farmers' market and producing a quarterly newsletter which is distributed to all households in the town. Pembroke Rugby Club organises the town's annual carnival, which is usually held in June. Pembroke Library shares a building with the Tourist Information Centre on Commons Road and offers a full lending service and internet access.

Pembroke has been twinned with the towns of Bergen, Lower Saxony, Germany, since 1977 and Pembroke, Malta, since 2002.

== Notable people ==
- King Henry VII (1457–1509), King of England, born in Pembroke Castle.
- William Lort Mansel (1753–1820), an English churchman and Cambridge fellow.
- Emma Leslie (English writer, 1838-1909) died in Pembroke, and is buried there.
- Frank Goodden (1889–1917), a pioneering British aviator and test pilot
- Mervyn Johns (1899–1992), a Welsh stage, film and TV character actor.
- W. F. Grimes (1905–1988), a Welsh archaeologist, studied the prehistory of Wales.
- Daniel Jones (1912–1993), a Welsh composer of classical music.
- John Cooke (1922–2011), a British doctor and senior Royal Air force officer.
- Peter Bishop (1953–2022), an English painter of mountain landscape of north Wales and an art historian.
- William Bowen (1862–1925), a Welsh international rugby union player, capped 13 times for Wales.
- Henry Davies (1865–1934), a Welsh horse racing jockey and first-class cricketer.
- W. J. A. Davies (1890–1967), a Welsh rugby union footballer, capped 22 times for England
- Reg Thomas (1907–1946), a Welsh middle-distance runner, he competed at the 1928 and 1932 Summer Olympics
- David Gwynne-James (1937−2011), a Welsh first-class cricketer, British Army officer and military historian.
- Scott Gammer (born 1976), a Welsh former professional boxer, British heavyweight title-holder from 2006 to 2007
- Jonathan Thomas (born 1982), a Welsh rugby union coach and former player, capped 67 times for Wales.

== Sport ==
Pembroke Rugby Club is on Upper Lamphey Road. The ground is called Crickmarren. The club plays in WRU Division Five West. Pembroke's main game of the season is often the local derby with rivals the Pembroke Dock Harlequins. Pembroke produced Ospreys and Welsh international Jonathan Thomas, Welsh international Dominic Day and Scotland international Luke Hamilton.

Other sporting clubs in the area include the football team Monkton Swifts.

The town is home to Pembroke Cricket Club. The cricket club plays its home games at its Treleet ground on Upper Lamphey Road, opposite the rugby club. The club currently has a 1st and a 2nd team playing in divisions 2 and 4 of the Pembrokeshire league. The club colours are green and gold.

== Public services ==
In 2012 a gas turbine power station was opened with an output capability of 2,000MW.

== Broadband blackspot ==
In February 2012, it was revealed that Pembroke was the UK's second-slowest broadband town. The average internet download speed in Pembroke was just over 1.6 Mbit/s (1600 kbit/s) compared to the UK average of 12.0 Mbit/s (12000 kbit/s) at the time.

BT's telephone exchange, which serves Pembroke and Pembroke Dock, was upgraded in 2014 under the Superfast Cymru programme and new cabinets were built to provide fiber-to-the-cabinet technology. Additional exchanges across Pembrokeshire were also being upgraded under the programme, with a goal of bringing superfast broadband to 96% of Wales by spring 2016. In 2022, alternative network provider Ogi announced plans to rollout fiber-to-the-premises technology in Pembroke allowing households access to broadbands speeds up to 1 Gbit/s (1000 Mbit/s).
