= Bernard Cohen (painter) =

British painter

Bernard Cohen (born 1933, London) is a British painter. He is regarded as one of the leading British abstract artists of his time.

== Biography ==
Bernard Cohen studied at Central Saint Martins School of Art in London between 1950-1951, followed by the Slade School of Art from 1954-1956. In 1957 Cohen received the Boise Traveling Scholarship and together with the French Government Scholarship awarded to him in 1954, he was able to travel and work in France, Spain and Italy. Following various teaching positions throughout the 60s and 70s at Ealing School of Art, the Slade, Chelsea College of Art & Design, the Royal College of Art and the University of New Mexico; in 1988 he was appointed Slade Professor and Director of the Slade School of Art, UCL, a position held until 2000.

Cohen's first solo exhibition took place at Gimpel Fils, London in 1958. His work has been exhibited widely as part of several international touring British Council exhibitions. Other notable exhibitions include, Five Young British Artists, the 1966 Venice Biennale's British Pavilion show, a retrospective at the Hayward Gallery in 1972 titled Bernard Cohen, Paintings & Drawings 1959-1971 and a Spotlight Display at Tate Britain in 2018.

His work is held in the collections of the Tate Gallery, UK, Victoria & Albert Museum, UK, Museum of Modern Art (MoMA), USA, Louisiana Museum of Modern Art, DK, Calouste Gulbenkian Foundation, PT, the British Council, UK, and many more both nationally and internationally.

Cohen lives and works in London and continues to exhibit his work widely with exhibitions in 2018 including a Spotlight Display at Tate Britain (4 December 2017 - 4 June 2018) and a show alongside his son Nathan Cohen at Flowers Gallery, Bernard & Nathan Cohen: Two Journeys (16 March 2018 - 5 May 2018).

== Bibliography ==
Exhibition Catalogues

- Bernard Cohen, Paintings and Drawings 1959-71 [Catalogue of the exhibition held at the Hayward Gallery, 6 April - 14 May 1972] London
- London: The New Scene [Catalogue of the touring exhibition organised collaboratively by Walker Art Center and British Council in association with the Calouste Gulbenkian Foundation held at Vancouver Art Gallery, Art Gallery of Toronto and National Gallery of Canada, 30 October 1965 - 20 May 1966] Canada
- Paintings from the Nineties [Catalogue of the exhibition held at Flowers East, 15 May – 21 June 1998] London
- Paintings from the Sixties, [Catalogue of the exhibition held at Flowers East, 2007] London

Monographs

- Lynton, N. & Mackay, I. (2009) Bernard Cohen: Work of Six Decades, Flowers, London
- Mackay, I. (2015) Bernard Cohen: About Now, Flowers, London.
