= River Gipping =

River in Suffolk, England

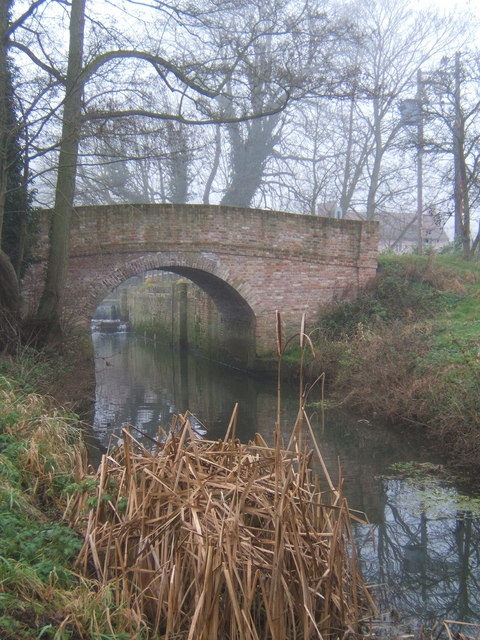
- Bridge over the River Gipping, with Creeting Lock chamber beyond
- Interactive map of River Gipping

Specifications
- Maximum boat length: 55 ft 0 in (16.76 m)
- Maximum boat beam: 14 ft 0 in (4.27 m)
- Locks: 15
- Status: Under Restoration

History
- Former names: Stowmarket Navigation
- Principal engineer: John Rennie
- Other engineer: William Jessop
- Date of act: 1790
- Date completed: 1793
- Date closed: 1934

Geography
- Start point: Stowmarket
- End point: Ipswich
- Connects to: River Orwell

The River Gipping is the source river for the River Orwell in the county of Suffolk in East Anglia, England, which is named from the village of Gipping, and which gave its name to the former Gipping Rural District. It rises near Mendlesham Green and flows in a south-westerly direction to reach Stowmarket. From there it flows towards the south or south east, passing through Needham Market then Baylham. The river continues to flow south between Great Blakenham and Claydon, and through Bramford and Sproughton until it flows into Ipswich, where it becomes the Orwell at Stoke Bridge. The river has supplied power to a number of watermills, several of which are still standing. None are operational, although the mill at Baylham retains most of its machinery, and is the only complete mill on the river.

There is evidence that the river was used for navigation in the thirteenth and seventeenth centuries, but in 1790 the Ipswich and Stowmarket Navigation Act 1790 (30 Geo. 3. c. 57) was obtained to enable the river to be improved from Ipswich to Stowmarket. This was achieved by building 15 locks, and the river was then known as the Stowmarket Navigation. The navigation was opened in 1793, and although few records were kept of income and expenditure, the enterprise appears to have been profitable. In 1819, there was talk of expansion, but nothing came of the plans. In the 1840s, as railways arrived in the area, the Trustees negotiated with the Eastern Union Railway, and the navigation was leased to them for 42 years. At the end of the lease, it was in a poor state, despite the fact that the railway had a legal duty to maintain it.

Traffic to Stowmarket never recovered, but there was some traffic through the lower four locks, with barges serving the Fison's and Packard's fertiliser factories at Bramford. By 1917, it was no longer economical to keep it open, and it closed in 1922, although a formal closing order was not obtained until the early 1930s. After a period of decay, the local branch of the Inland Waterways Association raised the idea of restoring it. The River Gipping Trust now spearhead this work, and several of the lock chambers have been restored, while the Gipping Valley River Path had been established along the towpath. There are many listed buildings along the course of the river, including some of the locks and bridges (Creeting lock and bridge and Baylham lock and bridge) several of the mill buildings and Fison's fertiliser warehouse at Bramford, which has been severely damaged by a fire leaving just a skeleton.

== Early use of the River Gipping ==
Early recorded use of the river includes the transporting of stone which was used in the rebuilding of Bury St Edmunds Abbey. The stone was carried in flat-bottomed boats to Rattlesden. Although some sources record that it was Caen stone imported from Normandy, the stone actually came from quarries at Barnack in Northamptonshire, which were owned by the abbot of Peterborough. There is also some confusion about the date of this activity, and whether it was for the original building of the abbey between 1070 and 1095, or for a rebuilding in the 13th century. It is more certain that Stowmarket church bells were recast in the 17th century after being transported down-river.

The first proposal for the construction of the navigation was in 1719, but the traders of Ipswich objected, fearing loss of trade. It was not until 1789 that six local gentlemen (two of whom were vicars) with foresight realised that because of poor transport, due to badly-maintained turnpike roads, the population and industries were dwindling in the Stowmarket area. They engaged William Jessop, who employed Isaac Lenny as the surveyor and a parliamentary bill for the construction of the navigation was introduced on 17 February 1790. It became an act of Parliament as the Ipswich and Stowmarket Navigation Act 1790 (30 Geo. 3. c. 57) on 1 April 1790, and created a board of trustees, consisting of six men. They were empowered to borrow £14,300 to finance the work, and an additional £6,000 if this became necessary. They also had powers to build an extension of the navigation from Stowupland Bridge for 3/4 mile (1.2 km) to the turnpike road that ran to Bury St Edmunds. An unusual clause in the act prohibited the carrying of fishing tackle by boats using the navigation, for which a fine of £5 could be charged.

== Construction of the navigation ==
The first meeting of the new company took place on 19 April 1790, and Jessop was asked to prepare drawings which would form the basis for tenders. The directors also decided to advertise for a surveyor, and on 7 June they appointed James Smith from Reading. They expected the navigation to be finished by October 1791, and so Smith's contract only ran until then. At the same meeting they appointed Mr Baynes of Stowmarket to handle legal matters, and Dyson and Pinkerton as contractors. Both were members of civil engineering families, whose careers had developed since the 1760s, and who had collaborated on a number of schemes, making them the first civil engineering contractors. John Dyson Sr had worked with James Pinkerton on the Adlingfleet Drainage scheme, the Driffield Navigation and the Laneham Drainage scheme, but for this project, he worked with George Pinkerton, thought to be one of James' younger sons.

Work started in 1790 at the Ipswich end of the navigation, but there were problems. Baynes was sacked after less than a month, because of "unaccommodating and improper behaviour", and in November, Dyson and Pinkerton were dismissed for trespassing on land which did not belong to the trustees. Legal action followed, which caused delays and involved the trustees in extra costs, although some work carried on during the lawsuit. Smith set up a brickworks in January 1791, and a contract to build six locks was awarded to Samuel Wright, millwright, of Ipswich in June. Because of the dispute, the Ipswich end was not sufficiently completed to enable materials to be carried up the navigation, and so they had to be carried overland to enable work on the Stowmarket end to continue. A verdict was reached in the dispute between Dyson and Pinkerton and the trustees on 14 November 1791, but the outcome is unclear.

The trustees next asked the civil engineer John Rennie to assess the state of the project. His inspection was carried out in the presence of the trustees on 13–15 December 1791, and he produced a report within a week. He reported that the section from Stowmarket and Needham Market, the other main town on the waterway, was almost complete, but advised that the towpath would need to be raised in places. There were three turf and timber locks, but he suggested that further locks should be made of brick. He felt that while Jessop had laid out the plans prior to the obtaining of the initial act of Parliament, there had been a failure to adequately survey the river and detail the works that would be required to construct the navigation. He particularly criticised Lenny's lack of accuracy, and recommended that a new survey should be made, so that the work needed could be identified.

John Rennie replaced William Jessop as engineer in December 1791 and Richard Coats was appointed surveyor at a salary of £200 p.a. as somebody with knowledge of bricklaying and masonry work. Rennie was appointed chief engineer of the Chelmer and Blackwater Navigation in 1793 some 40 miles away and Coat's left in October 1793 with a £50 gratuity when he was appointed Rennie's resident engineer on a salary of £240 p.a.

Rennie made his next report to the trustees on 23 April 1792. He estimated that £12,762 would be required to finish the work, of which £6,600 would be needed for the remaining 12 locks, which he thought could be built for £550 each. He then inspected the lower river, and agreed that Jessop's original site for the junction between the navigation and the River Orwell was the best available. He suggested that the timber locks should be rebuilt, once the navigation began to make a profit, and recommended that another act of Parliament should be obtained, to raise more money. The Ipswich and Stowmarket Navigation Act 1793 (33 Geo. 3. c. 20) was obtained on 28 March 1793, which authorised the trustees to borrow an extra £15,000, as the original capital had all been spent. The final cost of construction was £26,263, which was nearly double the original estimate. The waterway was just under 17 miles (27 km) long from Ipswich to Stowmarket, rising 90 feet (27 m) through 15 locks of broad construction each 55 by 14 feet (16.8 by 4.3 m), suitable for barges with a draught of 3 feet 4 inches (1.02 m). It was opened throughout on 14 September 1793.

=== Operation ===
The main cargoes on the navigation consisted of agricultural produce which travelled down stream, with coal and other heavy goods travelling in the opposite direction. Initially, there were up to four barges working on the navigation, and tolls for the first year amounted to £460. The number of barges then increased to 10 but frost and flooding in early 1795 caused serious damage, and £1,000 had to be spent on repairs. Despite a short-term fall in income, the tolls for the year ending in July 1795 came to £937. Subsequently, details of receipts were not recorded in the minutes of the Trustees, so are unknown, but they did record that barges were making over 30 trips each week in the early 1800s. Each trip took around seven hours. James Austin was appointed as surveyor in October 1804, but absconded in 1805. The trustees advertised in the Cambridge newspapers, offering a reward of 10 guineas (£10.50) if he could be apprehended and placed in jail.

=== Expansion ===
During 1791, when the trustees were negotiating with John Rennie, they had asked him to assess an extension of the navigation from Stowmarket to the River Lark at Bury St Edmunds, but this was not pursued. With the navigation thriving, there were two proposals for canals from Ipswich to Eye, Suffolk in 1819. A meeting was held in January at Eye, which was chaired by Charles Cornwallis, 2nd Marquess Cornwallis. It considered two reports, one proposed by the civil engineer William Cubitt, which involved a tunnel through the hills at Mendlesham, with the estimated cost exceeding £100,000, and another, for a canal over the hills, costing £80,000. Both were thought to be too expensive to implement, but a third proposal emerged, for an extension from the River Gipping at Needham Market, which would follow the valley of a tributary through Creeting St Mary to Earl Stonham, where a basin would be built beside the turnpike road (now the A140 road). This would enable waggons to make a round trip from Eye in a single day, rather than the two days that a trip to Ipswich took. The scheme was estimated to cost £12,000, and shares in it were offered at the meeting. Although many were taken up, the scheme did not advance any further.

=== Decline ===
Navigation between Stowmarket and Ipswich Act 1846
- Act of Parliament
- Parliament of the United Kingdom
- Long title: An Act for amending an Act passed in the Thirtieth Year of the Reign of His late Majesty King George the Third, for making and maintaining a navigable Communication between Stowmarket and Ipswich in the County of Suffolk, so as to enable the Trustees of such Act to lease the said Navigation; and for other Purposes connected therewith.
- Citation: 9 & 10 Vict. c. cvi
- Territorial extent: United Kingdom

Dates
- Royal assent: 26 June 1846

Other legislation
- Amends: Ipswich and Stowmarket Navigation Act 1790
- Relates to: Great Eastern Railway Act 1862

Status: Current legislation

When the Eastern Union Railway announced plans for an extension from Ipswich to Stowmarket in 1844, the trustees negotiated with the company to lease their canal. They hoped that this would be of benefit to the shareholders, and that it would help the railway by removing one source of opposition to their plans. They submitted a firm proposal for the lease on 8 February 1845, to which the railway agreed, and the shareholders sanctioned the action soon afterwards. They engaged a parliamentary agent to handle the details, who realised that the original act of Parliament, dating from 1790, expressly prohibited the trustees from leasing the canal. By September, the two sides had agreed that each of them would seek to obtain powers to overturn the clause. The railway company would pay £1,070 per year for the first 21 years, and £850 per year for the second 21 years. The trustees sought an act of Parliament to authorise this, which contained a clause requiring the railway company to maintain the navigation. The House of Lords were not convinced that the clause was strong enough, and amended it to ensure that the railway had to maintain it "in as good a state and condition as the same shall be at the time of passing of the Act." With this amendment in place, the Navigation between Stowmarket and Ipswich Act 1846 (9 & 10 Vict. c. cvi) was passed on 26 June 1846.

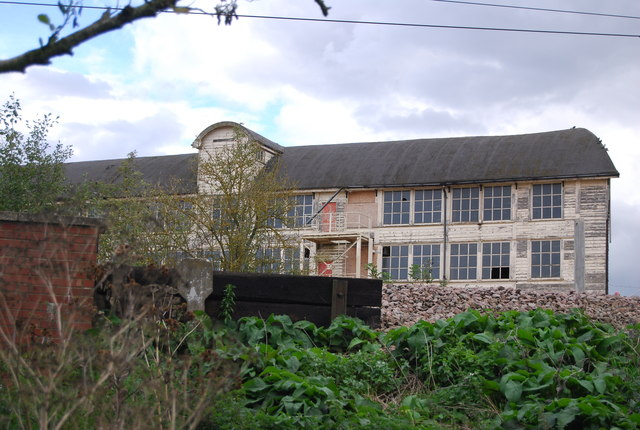
Part of Fison's grade II listed factory, built in 1858 and destroyed by fire in 2019, which shipped fertiliser down the navigation during its final years

Meanwhile, the railway company was obtaining its own act of Parliament, which had initially included a similar clause about maintenance, but this had been dropped by the time the act was passed. The Railway Commissioners voiced their concern that the railway had somehow managed to gain control over a navigation without any of the details being included in their own act. They raised the issue in their report to Parliament in 1847.

The line opened in 1846, and with it came a serious decline in traffic on the navigation. The condition of the waterway declined, and the Railway Commissioners asked the Great Eastern Railway who had taken over the Eastern Union Railway, to repair the defective sections in 1869. When the 42-year period of the lease was close to ending, the two sides met, and the railway declined to extend the lease. The navigation was by this time in a poor condition, with little traffic, but because of the clause in the 1846 act, the railway company offered the trustees £2,000 in lieu of repairs. This was agreed on 5 January 1888, and the money was paid on 23 March.

Trade on the upper part of the navigation to Stowmarket was extremely limited, with just an occasional barge carrying manure to Prentice's Manure Works, and returning with guncotton, which was manufactured at an explosives works. There was more traffic between Ipswich and Bramford, as barges regularly worked to Fison's and Packard's factories. The companies paid lower tolls because they helped to maintain the lock gates and clear weeds from the channel. 30-ton barges were worked through the lower four locks in trains of two dumb barges with a steam-powered barge pulling them. By 1917, the undertaking was virtually bankrupt. Income amounted to around £220 per year, with expenditure running at £480, and there was no capital left. The trustees tried to make economies, but in May 1922, with the current account overdrawn, they resolved to close the navigation from 3 June 1922.

The trustees met again in November 1930, and in 1932 resolved to formally close the navigation. The passing of the Land Drainage Act 1930 meant that they did not need to obtain an act of Parliament to do so, and instead a closing order was obtained under section 41 of that act. The Minister of Agriculture and Fisheries confirmed the order on 5 October 1932. A final meeting was held on 16 March 1934, when debts were settled, and the remaining money was split between East Suffolk County Council and the catchment board, who had responsibility for the river under the terms of the Land Drainage Act 1930. All records were passed to the clerk of the catchment board, and the meeting closed with a vote of thanks to the trustees' own clerk for his commitment over the years. The waterway gradually fell into decay.

== Restoration ==
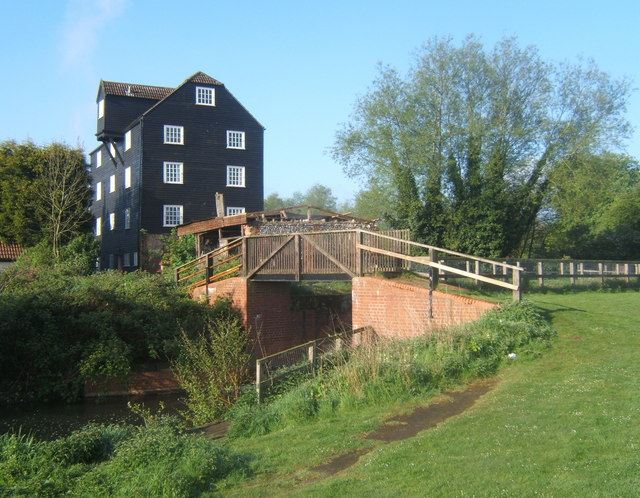
Bosmere Mill, with the restored lock chamber to the right

The River Gipping Trust aim to restore navigation once more, restore and improve the towpath and provide recreational and leisure facilities to improve the life and welfare of the areas inhabitants. The Trust are currently working on improving and restoring parts of the towpath between Paper Mill Lock and Badley Lock and concentrating their navigational restoration efforts on the 2.5 mile stretch of river between Needham Market and Baylham with many of the locks fully restored ready for lock gates to be installed.

Restoration work was started by the Inland Waterways Amenity Advisory Council, which had been reconstituted by the government in the spring of 1974, the Eastern Region branch of the Inland Waterways Association (IWA) began to take an active role in the improvement of the River Gipping. This cause was highlighted by an article in the December 1979 edition of the waterways magazine Waterways World, which showed the state of the navigation, and noted that the long-term aim of the local branch of the IWA was restoration to navigable standards for leisure traffic. Already the group had been clearing the towpath, and this led to the setting up of the Gipping Valley River Path, a footpath from Ipswich to Stowmarket which uses the towpath for most of its route. Between 1993 and 2004, members of the IWA worked on the reconstruction of first Bosmere and then Creeting locks. Subsequently, the chamber of Baylham lock has been restored, although no gates have been fitted, and work has been carried out at Pipps Ford to restore a bridge over the tail of the lock and the river channel around the lock.

Claydon lock was destroyed when the A45 road was built. The river at this point was diverted through a new cut, and the remains of the lock lies buried adjacent to the road, which has now become the A14 trunk road. The River Gipping Trust are working with the Highways Agency in establishing what remains of the lock and the possibility of carrying out a feasibility study of the 230 year old lock. Water levels on the river are regulated by various devices. Hawks Mill lock at Needham Market has had an automatic rising sluice gate fitted, while Paper Mill lock incorporates an automatic tilting sluice gate.

In 2007, the Inland Waterways Association decided that it would be better to set up a separate organisation to manage restoration of the navigation, and the River Gipping Trust was formed in May of that year. It is a private company limited by guarantee, and is registered at Companies House with company number 06145692. It is also registered as a charity.

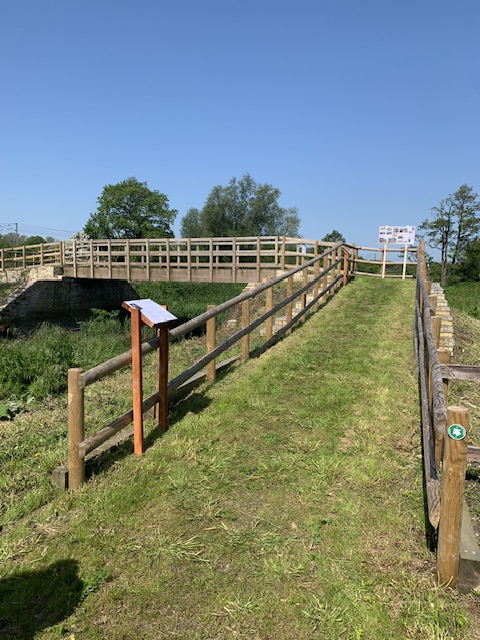

In 2021 The River Gipping Trust restored the original 1793 brick bridge abutments at Baylham and installed a new wooden footbridge platform across the river replacing one last seen at the bottom of the river in 1942. Work continued through 2022 on the wheelchair friendly ramps leading up to the footbridge with a grand opening in May 2023 by local MP Dr Dan Poulter, which enabled 1km of permissive footpath to be opened along the line of the original towpath, not walked for around 100 years.

In 2023 the Trust completed the restoration of Pipps Ford Lock, the fourth lock to be fully restored up to lock gate installation level. Baylham, Creeting and Bosmere being the other three.

== Route ==
The source of the River Gipping is in the village of Mendlesham Green. It rises to the north of the village, just above the 160-foot (49 m) contour, and is fed by waters drained from fields. It heads towards the south-west, passing under the main street of Mendlesham Green by Green Farm, a grade II listed timber-framed and plastered farmhouse dating from the sixteenth and seventeenth centuries. It continues in the same general direction, passing Great Gipping Wood and Old Newton Hall, both on the north bank. The hall is a grade II* listed structure, dating from 1600 to 1630, with later additions. The joinery in one of the rooms in the left wing is exceptional. By Stonebridge Ford, the river is joined by a stream flowing northwards from Columbine Hall, a grade II* listed former manor house built of flint rubble around 1400, and another stream flowing southwards from Old Newton. By Bridge Farm, another timber-framed and plastered farmhouse dating from the late sixteenth century, Newton Bridge carries the B1113 road over the river, which then passes under a railway bridge, crosses the 100-foot (30 m) contour, and is joined by Haughley Watercourse, which flows southwards through Haughley and Dagworth.

The river now turns to the south east, and passes under the A14 Stowmarket Bypass to enter Stowmarket. It is crossed by Stowupland Street and Station Road, below which the river was made navigable. Immediately after Station Road bridge is The Maltings, originally a malthouse, but adapted as a warehouse to serve the navigation. The brick-built structure has nine openings on the ground floor, which once held chutes for loading barges, and two loading doors on the first floor. It is now used as a restaurant and leisure centre. The Gipping Valley River Path runs along the eastern bank of the river, which is flanked by industrial buildings. It is joined by the Rattlesden River, flowing from the west. Stowupland Lock was just below the junction, beyond which the river passes under the A1120 road bridge. Beyond the bridge, Badley Mill House is a seventeenth-century former mill-house. It has an eighteenth-century extension with a cellar dating from the early sixteenth century. The next bridge carries the railway over the river, and the site of Badley lock is close to Badley Mill Farm. The lock now acts as a weir. To the east of the lock is Creeting Hall, a mid-sixteenth-century manor house, with later additions, which is now divided into two dwellings.

The river is joined by the River Jordan on the east bank and Wattisham Watercourse on the west bank. To the east of Needham Market is Hawks Mill and Needham Lock. The lock is at the upstream end of the mill bypass channel. The present mill building was constructed in 1884. Although it still contains a working Armfield water turbine, all of the internal machinery has been removed. The road in front of it is supported by an eighteenth-century bridge. Just to the east are the remains of a post mill, originally built further north, but moved to its present location in 1880, and used as a dovecote. It is thought to be the last example of its type in the country. Needham Market sewage works is located on the east bank of the river, while to the west are some former gravel pits, which have been landscaped to become part of the 32-acre (13 ha) Needham Lake park. The park spans the river, and parts of it are a designated local nature reserve. The river splits into two just to the north of the B1078 bridge, with the River Gipping to the east and the Old River to the west. Bosmere lock is located below the bridge, and the four-storey timber-framed and weatherboarded mill building was used as a restaurant, but subsequently converted to private flats. The iron breast-shot water wheel remains, but the machinery does not. It was formerly called Barking Road Mill or Quinton's Mill, as there was a Bosmere Mill some 880 yards (800 m) further downstream.

The Gipping Valley River Path moves to the west bank at the bridge. The next lock downstream is Creetings Lock, with Riverside Farmhouse standing on the east bank. It was built in 1798 and was originally a mill house. The original Bosmere mill was close by, but was demolished in the early twentieth century. Coddenham Watercourse flowing west from Ashbocking through Coddenham joins the mill stream, and the Old River rejoins the main channel below that. Pipps Ford Lock came next, with Pipps Ford farmhouse, dating from the 16th and 17th centuries located to the east. The railway comes close to the river, and the Gipping Valley River Path briefly leaves the river, to run alongside the railway, but rejoins the towpath at Baylham Mill. A new footbridge has been installed and a permissive path runs along the river providing an alternative path to the one that runs alongside the railway, some 0.5km away from the river.The mill, close to a sixteenth-century mill house, was built in nineteenth century, and has three storeys with an attic storey containing storage bins. The cast iron breastshot waterwheel drove three pairs of stones through wooden shafting. Two additional pairs could either be water-powered, or an oil engine could drive them. Most of the machinery is still in situ, making it the only complete water mill on the river. There is a red-brick humped backed bridge over the tail of the adjacent lock, which was repaired with gault brick in the nineteenth century.

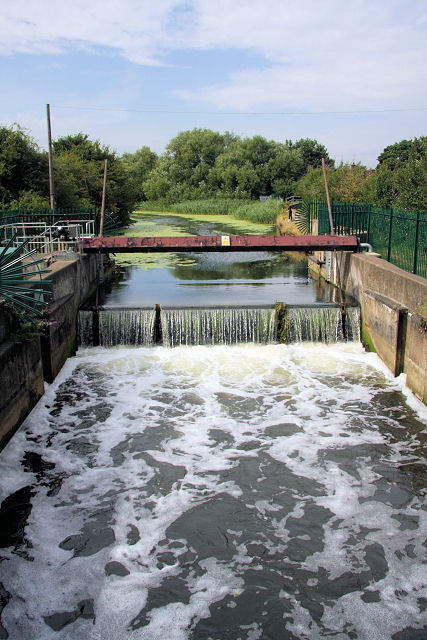
A weir has replaced the gates at Handford Sea Lock

To the east of the river, both above and below the lock, is the site of Combretovium, known to have contained two Roman forts. Finds have included a bronze statuette of Nero and a saddle-cloth weight, which may indicate that cavalry was stationed there. After Shamford Lock, the river is crossed by the railway, with Blakenham Lock situated to the north of Great Blakenham. The Gipping Way reverts to the east bank at the lock, and nearby is a nineteenth-century house called Gipping Weir. The river and railway re-cross, and to the east of the river there are extensive flooded gravel workings. At the southern end of the workings, the site of Claydon lock now lies beneath the A14 dual carriageway. Continuing southwards, the next lock was Paper Mill Lock, beside which is the paper mill. To the west, but separated from the river by the railway, is Suffolk Water Park, which occupies flooded gravel workings. To the south stood the north warehouse at Fisons Horticultural Division, which was built around 1858 to manufacture superphosphate fertiliser. To the south of the 90-metre (98 yd) building, Edward Packard established the world's first superphosphate factory between 1851 and 1854, and the two companies amalgamated soon after Joseph Fison set up his rival enterprise in 1858. Somersham Watercouse flows around the western edge of the Suffolk Water Park, and joins the west bank. The factory was closed in 2003 and completely destroyed in a fire, believed to be arson, on 6 May 2019.

After another crossing under the railway, the river skirts the eastern edge of Bramford and circles a hill, on top of which is Sproughton Manor, a grade II listed house built for Col Henry Phillipps in 1863 by the architect William Eden Nesfield. Sproughton Lock and mill are at the bottom of the hill. The mill is built in red brick and dates from the late eighteenth century. The mill race passes below the mill, which was operational until 1947, but all the machinery has been removed. Parts of the adjacent mill house date from around 1600. After passing under the A14 road, the river briefly heads north-east, through Chantry Cut, where Chantry Lock is situated, to pass under the railway. There are two bridges, as the railway line forks on the south side of the river. A flood barrier has been installed below the first bridge. Now passing through Ipswich, the river also forks, with the eastern branch being the River Gipping, and the western branch forming the start of the River Orwell. A modern sluice is located on the Orwell just below the junction. A final weir marks the position of Handford Sea Lock, below which the two channels rejoin. An outfall is situated below the junction, beyond which the river is tidal.

=== Little Gipping ===
Just north of the Handford Sea Lock weir, a freshwater spur extends to the east. This waterway is of human construction and may date back to Roman times. It has undergone a number of names over the years, but is best known as the Little Gipping. As much of its route has been filled-in, what is left constitutes an important part of the Alderman Canal West and Alderman Canal East, two Local Nature Reserves.

== Water quality ==
The Environment Agency measure the water quality of the river systems in England. Each is given an overall ecological status, which may be one of five levels: high, good, moderate, poor and bad. There are several components that are used to determine this, including biological status, which looks at the quantity and varieties of invertebrates, angiosperms and fish. Chemical status, which compares the concentrations of various chemicals against known safe concentrations, is rated good or fail.

The water quality of the River Gipping system was as follows in 2016.

Section	Ecological Status	Chemical Status	Length	Catchment	Channel
Gipping (u/s Stowmarket)	Moderate	Fail	4.6 miles (7.4 km)	10.18 square miles (26.4 km^{2})	
Haughley Watercourse	Moderate	Fail	2.5 miles (4.0 km)	11.88 square miles (30.8 km^{2})	
Gipping (through Stowmarket)	Moderate	Fail	1.7 miles (2.7 km)	1.54 square miles (4.0 km^{2})	
Rattlesden River (d/s Gt. Finborough)	Moderate	Fail	3.0 miles (4.8 km)	5.05 square miles (13.1 km^{2})	
Jordan (East Suffolk)	Good	Fail	5.0 miles (8.0 km)	9.96 square miles (25.8 km^{2})	
Wattisham Watercourse	Moderate	Fail	5.0 miles (8.0 km)	6.74 square miles (17.5 km^{2})	
Coddenham Watercourse	Moderate	Fail	5.5 miles (8.9 km)	11.28 square miles (29.2 km^{2})	
Somersham Watercourse	Moderate	Fail	6.4 miles (10.3 km)	9.76 square miles (25.3 km^{2})	heavily modified
Gipping (d/s Stowmarket)	Poor	Fail	16.1 miles (25.9 km)	37.52 square miles (97.2 km^{2})	heavily modified

The reasons for the quality being less than good include sewage discharge affecting most of the river, physical modification of channels, ground water abstraction, and poor management of agricultural and rural land adjacent to the river system. Like most rivers in the UK, the chemical status changed from good to fail in 2019, due to the presence of polybrominated diphenyl ethers (PBDE), perfluorooctane sulphonate (PFOS) and mercury compounds, none of which had previously been included in the assessment.

== Points of interest ==
Point	Coordinates (Links to map resources)	OS Grid Ref	Notes
Source at Mendlesham Green	52.2310°N 1.0699°E	TM097636	
First crossing under railway	52.2025°N 0.9922°E	TM045602	Jn with stream from Dagworth
The Maltings (warehouse)	52.1892°N 0.9987°E	TM050587	
Site of Stowupland Lock	52.1819°N 1.0074°E	TM057580	
Badley Lock	52.1706°N 1.0304°E	TM073568	
Needham Lock	52.1584°N 1.0527°E	TM089555	
Bosmere Lock	52.1506°N 1.0625°E	TM096546	
Creeting Lock	52.1468°N 1.0756°E	TM105542	
Pipps Ford Lock	52.1409°N 1.0777°E	TM107536	
Baylham Lock	52.1324°N 1.0851°E	TM112527	
Shamford Lock	52.1258°N 1.0930°E	TM118520	
Blakenham Lock	52.1157°N 1.0935°E	TM119508	
Site of Claydon Lock	52.1097°N 1.1058°E	TM127502	
Paper Mill Lock	52.0915°N 1.1019°E	TM125482	
Bramford Lock	52.0762°N 1.1022°E	TM126465	
Sproughton Lock	52.0640°N 1.0983°E	TM124451	
Chantry Lock	52.0579°N 1.1101°E	TM133445	
Rapier sluice	52.0592°N 1.1344°E	TM149447	to River Orwell
Handford Sea Lock	52.0551°N 1.1382°E	TM152442	

== See also ==
- Rivers of Great Britain
- Canals of Great Britain
- History of the British canal system

== Bibliography ==
- Boyes, John; Russell, Ronald (1977). The Canals of Eastern England. David and Charles. ISBN 978-0-7153-7415-3.
- Cumberlidge, Jane (2009). Inland Waterways of Great Britain (8th ed.). Imray Laurie Norie and Wilson. ISBN 978-1-84623-010-3.
- Priestley, Joseph (1831). Historical Account of the Navigable Rivers, Canals, and Railways of Great Britain. Archived from the original on 3 March 2016.
- Skempton, Sir Alec; et al. (2002). A Biographical Dictionary of Civil Engineers in Great Britain and Ireland: Vol 1: 1500 to 1830. Thomas Telford. ISBN 978-0-7277-2939-2.
- Squires, Roger (2008). Britain's restored canals. Landmark Publishing. ISBN 978-1-84306-331-5.
- Petchey, Ian; The River Gipping Trust (2022). The Ipswich to Stowmarket Navigation - John Rennie's First Canal Project. ISBN 978-1-7396717-0-9.
