= Millennium Wood, Ipswich =

Nature reserve in Suffolk, England

Coordinates: 52.029°N 1.124°E

Millennium Wood
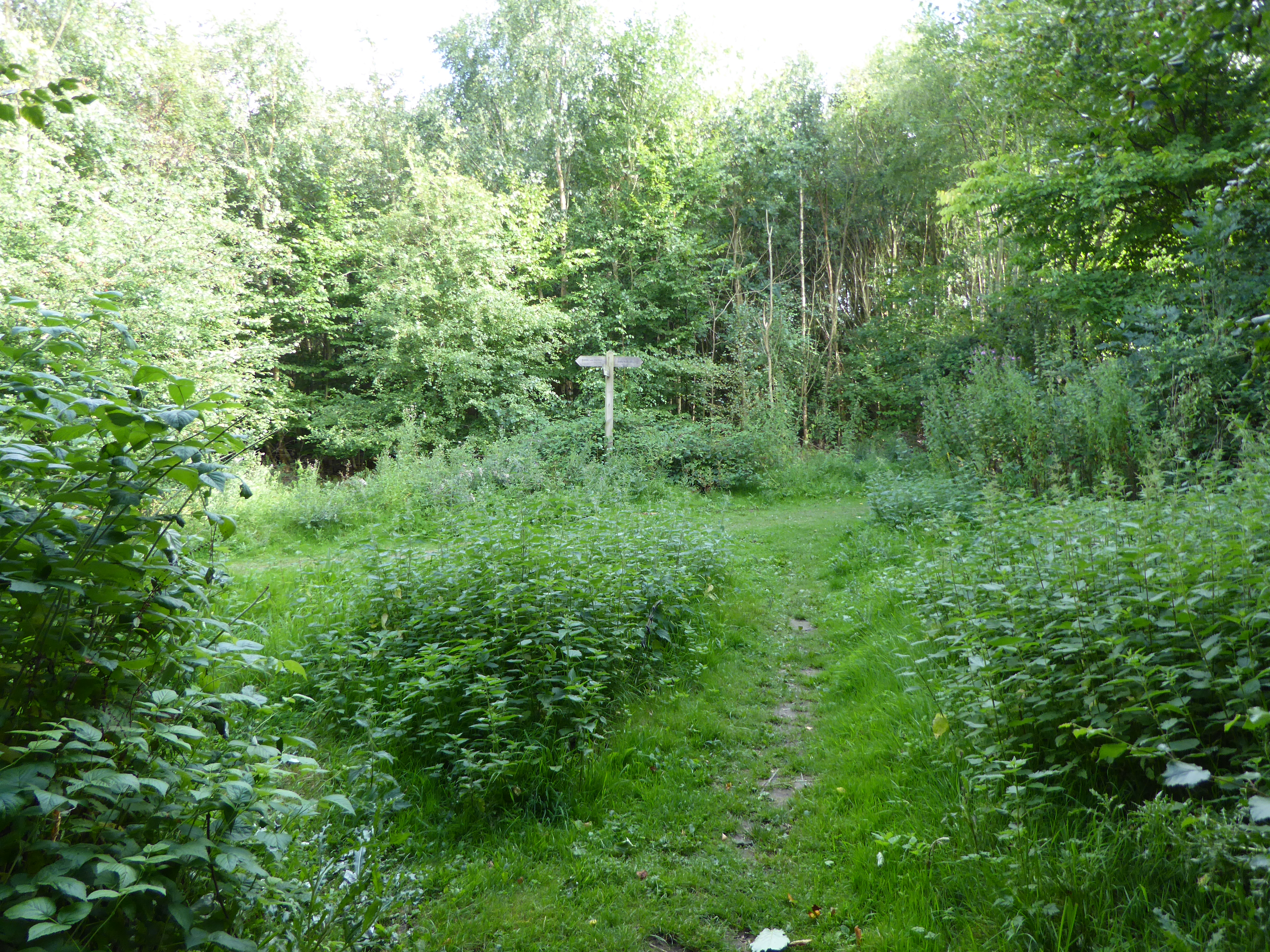
- Interactive map of Millennium Wood
- Type: Local Nature Reserve
- Location: Ipswich, Suffolk
- OS grid: TM 144 413
- Area: 3.8 hectares (9.4 acres)
- Manager: Greenways Countryside Project

Millennium Wood is a 3.8 hectare Local Nature Reserve on the southern outskirts of Ipswich in Suffolk. It is owned by Suffolk County Council and managed by the Greenways Countryside Project.

New saplings have been planted on the edge of this ancient, semi-natural wood of hornbeam and coppiced lime. There are many flowers in the spring such as bluebells, wild garlic and archangel.

There is access from Bobbits Lane.
