= Mill Stream =

Mill Stream may be:

- Castle Mill Stream, Oxford, England
- Clewer Mill Stream, Windsor, England
- Pevensey Mill Stream, East Sussex, England, source of Sackville Sewer
- Mill Stream Nature Reserve, Suffolk, England
- The Mill Stream, an 1814 landscape painting by John Constable

== See also ==
- Millstream (disambiguation)
- Bush Mill Stream Natural Area Preserve, Virginia, USA
- "Down by the Old Mill Stream", a song by Tell Taylor
