= Alderman Canal East =

Natural preserve in Suffolk, England

Coordinates: 52.057°N 1.142°E

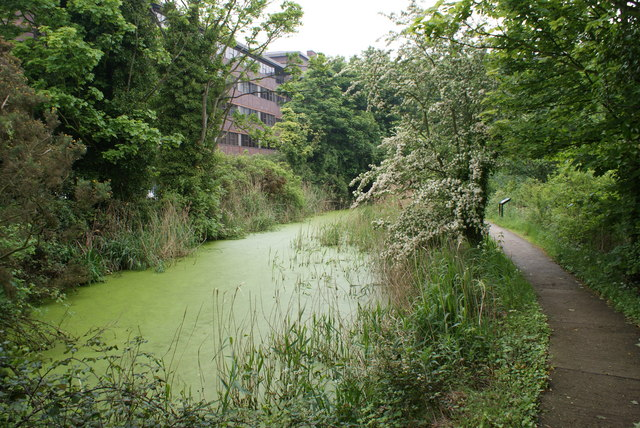
- Interactive map of Alderman Canal East
- Type: Local Nature Reserve
- Location: Ipswich, Suffolk
- OS grid: TM 155 445
- Area: 1.6 hectares (4.0 acres)
- Manager: Greenways Project, Ipswich Borough Council

Alderman Canal East is a 1.6 hectare Local Nature Reserve in Ipswich in Suffolk. It is owned by Ipswich Borough Council and managed by the Greenways Countryside Project.

A path runs along a canalised part of the River Gipping, and the site also has reedbeds, a ditch and grassland with tall herbs. There are uncommon wetland flora, and birds include spotted flycatchers, common kingfishers and reed buntings.

There is access from Alderman Road.

== See also ==
- Alderman Canal West
