= Millstream =

Millstream may refer to:

== Places ==
=== Australia ===
- Millstream, Queensland, locality in the Tablelands Region, Queensland
- Millstream, a headstream of the Herbert River, Queensland
- Millstream Falls, Queensland
- Millstream-Chichester National Park, national park in Western Australia
- Millstream Station, former pastoral lease in Western Australia

== Other ==
- Millstream Brewing, a small beer brewery located in Amana, Iowa.
- The Millstream, a fictional stream in the World of Greyhawk campaign setting for the Dungeons & Dragons role-playing game.
- A leat, an artificial watercourse or aqueduct dug into the ground, supplying water to a watermill or its mill pond

== See also ==
- Mill Stream (disambiguation), similarly named places or objects
