= Sandlings =

Nature reserve in Suffolk, England

Coordinates: 52.056°N 1.213°E

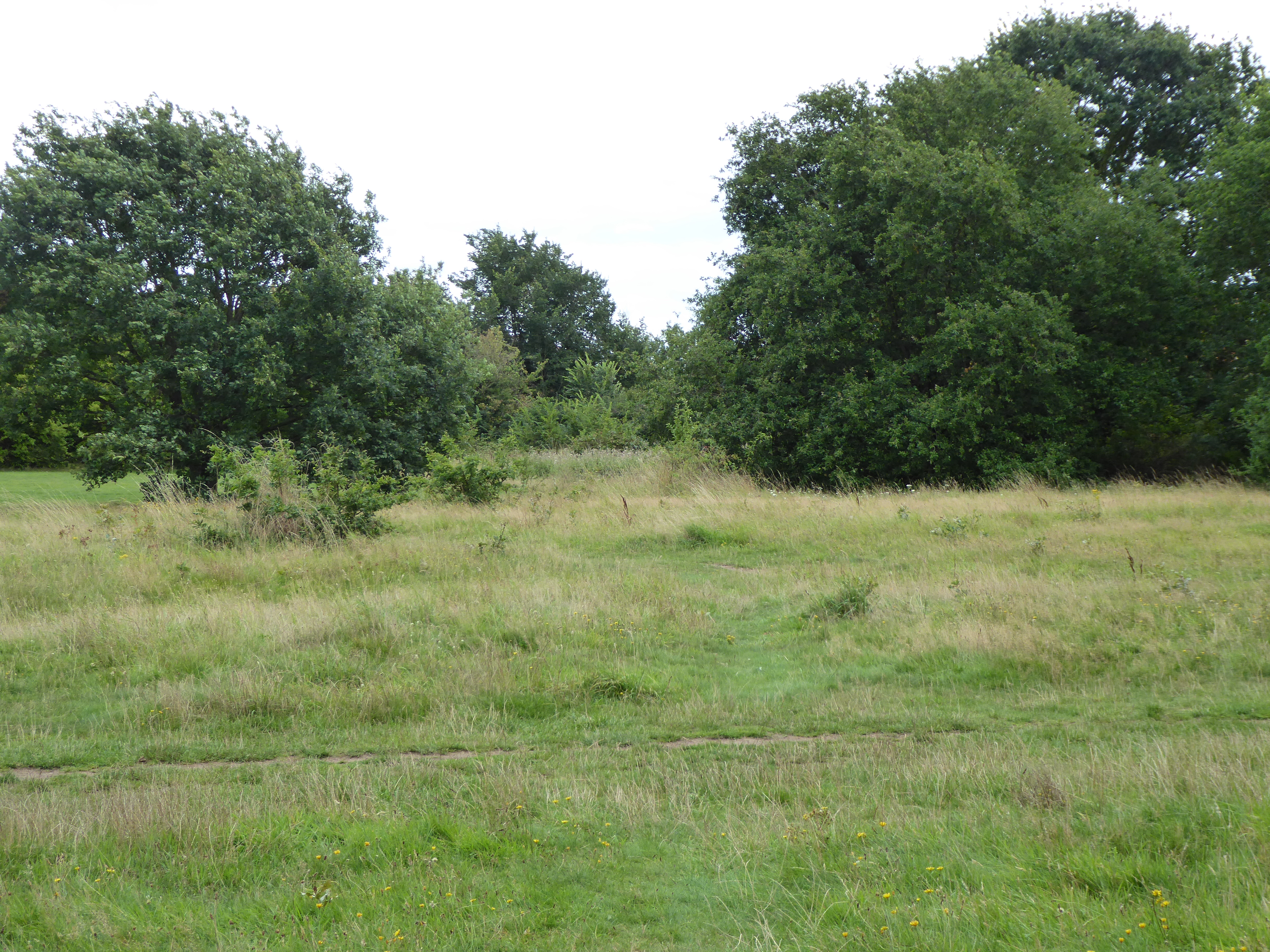
- Interactive map of Sandlings
- Type: Local Nature Reserve
- Location: Rushmere St Andrew, Suffolk
- OS grid: TM204445
- Area: 5.7 hectares (14 acres)
- Manager: East Suffolk council, Rushmere St Andrew Parish Council and The Greenways Countryside Project

Sandlings is a 5.7-hectare (14-acre) Local Nature Reserve in Rushmere St Andrew, on the eastern outskirts of Ipswich in Suffolk. It is owned by East Suffolk council, and managed by the council together with Rushmere St Andrew Parish Council and the Greenways Countryside Project.

This site has acid grassland, a wildflower meadow, and areas of scrub. Nearly 70 species of bird have been observed and 22 of butterfly, including the white-letter hairstreak.

There is access from Ditchingham Grove.
