= Greenways Countryside Project =

Environmental project in Suffolk, England

Greenways Countryside Project is an environmental project in the Ipswich area, Suffolk. It was founded in 1994 and by 2018 it was involved in the protection and management of around 100 square kilometres green spaces in and around Ipswich.

== Foundation and early years ==
Greenways Countryside Project was founded in 1994 by Suffolk County Council, Ipswich Borough Council, Babergh District Council, and Suffolk Coastal District Council with funding from the Countryside Commission, which continued for six years. In its first ten years Greenways responsible for mobilising 7,181 volunteer days of work during this period.

== Sites ==
Sites in which Greenways is involved include:

- Alderman Canal East and Alderman Canal West
- Bobbits Lane
- Millennium Wood
- Mill Stream Nature Reserve
- Sandlings
