= Ipswich and Stowmarket Navigation Act 1790 =

Act of the Parliament of Great Britain

- Act of Parliament
- Parliament of Great Britain
- Long title: An act for effectually carrying into execution an act of parliament of the thirtieth year of his present Majesty, for making and maintaining a navigable communication between Stowmarket and Ipswich, in the county of Suffolk.
- Citation: 30 Geo. 3. c. 57
- Territorial extent: Great Britain

Dates
- Royal assent: 1 April 1790
- Commencement: 21 January 1790 (Note: Start of session.)
- Repealed
Other legislation
Repealed by	Navigation between Stowmarket and Ipswich Act 1846; Land Drainage Act 1930; Ipswich and Stowmarket Navigation Acts Revocation Order 1934
Relates to	Ipswich and Stowmarket Navigation Act 1793

Status: Repealed

Text of statute as originally enacted

The Ipswich and Stowmarket Navigation Act 1790 (30 Geo. 3. c. 57) was an act of the Parliament of Great Britain to facilitate the development of the River Gipping to make it navigable from Stowmarket to Ipswich.

Parliament had been petitioned in 1719 to make the River Gipping navigable, but this had been opposed by Ipswich Corporation, fearing that such a development would have a negative impact on their vested interests. However, following advances in civil engineering during the eighteenth century, the 1790 bill was passed. The act set up the Stowmarket Navigation Trust.

== Ipswich and Stowmarket Navigation Act 1793 ==
Ipswich and Stowmarket Navigation Act 1793
- Act of Parliament
- Parliament of Great Britain
- Long title: An Act for effectually carrying into Execution an Act of Parliament of the Thirtieth Year of His present Majesty, for making and maintaining a Navigable Communication between Stowmarket and Ipswich, in the County of Suffolk.
- Citation: 33 Geo. 3. c. 20
- Territorial extent: Great Britain

Dates
- Royal assent: 28 March 1793
- Commencement: 13 December 1792
- Repealed
Other legislation
Amended by	Land Drainage Act 1930
Repealed by	Ipswich and Stowmarket Navigation Acts Revocation Order 1934
Relates to	Ipswich and Stowmarket Navigation Act 1790

Status: Repealed

Text of statute as originally enacted

After a protracted lawsuit, the Stowmarket Navigation Trust needed to raise a further £15,000 which was enabled by the Ipswich and Stowmarket Navigation Act 1793 (33 Geo. 3. c. 20).
