= List of acts of the Parliament of Great Britain from 1790 =

This is a complete list of acts of the Parliament of Great Britain for the year 1790.

For acts passed until 1707, see the list of acts of the Parliament of England and the list of acts of the Parliament of Scotland. See also the list of acts of the Parliament of Ireland.

For acts passed from 1801 onwards, see the list of acts of the Parliament of the United Kingdom. For acts of the devolved parliaments and assemblies in the United Kingdom, see the list of acts of the Scottish Parliament, the list of acts of the Northern Ireland Assembly, and the list of acts and measures of Senedd Cymru; see also the list of acts of the Parliament of Northern Ireland.

The number shown after each act's title is its chapter number. Acts are cited using this number, preceded by the year(s) of the reign during which the relevant parliamentary session was held; thus the Union with Ireland Act 1800 is cited as "39 & 40 Geo. 3. c. 67", meaning the 67th act passed during the session that started in the 39th year of the reign of George III and which finished in the 40th year of that reign. Note that the modern convention is to use Arabic numerals in citations (thus "41 Geo. 3" rather than "41 Geo. III"). Acts of the last session of the Parliament of Great Britain and the first session of the Parliament of the United Kingdom are both cited as "41 Geo. 3".

Acts passed by the Parliament of Great Britain did not have a short title; however, some of these acts have subsequently been given a short title by acts of the Parliament of the United Kingdom (such as the Short Titles Act 1896).

Before the Acts of Parliament (Commencement) Act 1793 came into force on 8 April 1793, acts passed by the Parliament of Great Britain were deemed to have come into effect on the first day of the session in which they were passed. Because of this, the years given in the list below may in fact be the year before a particular act was passed.

== 30 Geo. 3 ==
The seventh session of the 16th Parliament of Great Britain, which met from 21 January 1790 until 10 June 1790.

This session was also traditionally cited as 30 G. 3.

=== Public acts ===
Short title	Citation	Royal assent
Long title
Importation and Exportation Act 1790 (repealed)	30 Geo. 3. c. 1	25 February 1790
An Act for indemnifying all Persons who have been concerned in advising or carrying into Execution certain Orders of Council respecting the Importation and Exportation of Corn and Grain; and also certain Orders issued by the Governor General of His Majesty's Colonies in America; (Note: Lord Dorchester.) and for preventing Suits in consequence of the same; and for making further Provisions relative thereto. (Repealed by Statute Law Revision Act 1871 (34 & 35 Vict. c. 116))
Land Tax Act 1790 (repealed)	30 Geo. 3. c. 2	25 February 1790
An Act for granting an Aid to His Majesty by a Land Tax, to be raised in Great Britain, for the Service of the Year One thousand seven hundred and ninety. (Repealed by Statute Law Revision Act 1871 (34 & 35 Vict. c. 116))
Malt Duties Act 1790 (repealed)	30 Geo. 3. c. 3	25 February 1790
An Act for continuing and granting to His Majesty certain Duties upon Malt, Mum, Cyder, and Perry, for the Service of the Year One thousand seven hundred and ninety. (Repealed by Statute Law Revision Act 1871 (34 & 35 Vict. c. 116))
Customs Act 1790 (repealed)	30 Geo. 3. c. 4	1 April 1790
An Act for taking off the Duties upon unwrought Tin exported to any of the Countries beyond the Cape of Good Hope. (Repealed by Statute Law Revision Act 1861 (24 & 25 Vict. c. 101))
Payment of Creditors (Scotland) Act 1790 (repealed)	30 Geo. 3. c. 5	1 April 1790
An Act for continuing the Term of so much of an Act made in the Twenty-third Year of the Reign of His present Majesty, (Note: Payment of Creditors (Scotland) Act 1783 (23 Geo. 3. c. 18)) as relates to the rendering the Payment of Creditors more equal and expeditious in that Part of Great Britain called Scotland. (Repealed by Statute Law Revision Act 1871 (34 & 35 Vict. c. 116))
Mutiny Act 1790 (repealed)	30 Geo. 3. c. 6	25 February 1790
An Act for punishing Mutiny and Desertion, and for the better Payment of the Army and their Quarters. (Repealed by Statute Law Revision Act 1871 (34 & 35 Vict. c. 116))
Marine Mutiny Act 1790 (repealed)	30 Geo. 3. c. 7	25 February 1790
An Act for the Regulation of His Majesty's Marine Forces while on Shore. (Repealed by Statute Law Revision Act 1871 (34 & 35 Vict. c. 116))
Trade Act 1790 (repealed)	30 Geo. 3. c. 8	1 April 1790
An Act to amend Two Acts made in the Twenty-eighth Year of the Reign of His present Majesty, the one intituled, "An Act for regulating the Trade between the Subjects of His Majesty's Colonies and Plantations in North America and in the West India Islands, and the Countries belonging to the United States of America, and between His Majesty's said Subjects, and the Foreign Islands in the West Indies;" (Note: Trade Act 1788 (28 Geo. 3. c. 6)) and the other, intituled, "An Act to allow the Importation of Rum, or other Spirits from His Majesty's Colonies or Plantations in the West Indies, into the Province of Quebec, without Payment of Duty, under certain Conditions and Restrictions." (Note: Importation Act 1788 (28 Geo. 3. c. 39)) (Repealed by Trade Act 1822 (3 Geo. 4. c. 44))
Militia Pay Act 1790 (repealed)	30 Geo. 3. c. 9	1 April 1790
An Act for defraying the Charge of Pay and Cloathing of the Militia in that Part of Great Britain called England, for One Year, beginning the Twenty-fifth Day of March One thousand seven hundred and ninety. (Repealed by Statute Law Revision Act 1871 (34 & 35 Vict. c. 116))
Speaker of House of Commons Act 1790 (repealed)	30 Geo. 3. c. 10	1 April 1790
An Act for the better Support of the Dignity of the Speaker of the House of Commons, and for disabling the Speaker of the House of Commons for the Time being, from holding any Office or Place of Profit, during Pleasure under the Crown. (Repealed by House of Commons (Speaker) Act 1832 (2 & 3 Will. 4. c. 105))
Trade with America Act 1790 (repealed)	30 Geo. 3. c. 11	1 April 1790
An Act to continue the Laws now in Force, for regulating the Trade between the Subjects of His Majesty's Dominions, and the Inhabitants of the Territories belonging to the United States of America, so far as the same relate to the Trade and Commerce carried on between this Kingdom, and the Inhabitants of the Countries belonging to the said United States. (Repealed by Statute Law Revision Act 1871 (34 & 35 Vict. c. 116))
Indemnity Act 1790 (repealed)	30 Geo. 3. c. 12	1 April 1790
An Act to indemnify such Persons as have omitted to qualify themselves for Offices and Employments, and to indemnify Justices of the Peace or others, who have omitted to register or deliver in their Qualifications within the Time limited by Law, and for giving further Time for those Purposes; and to indemnify Members and Officers in Cities, Corporations, and Borough Towns, whose Admissions have been omitted to be stamped according to Law, or having been stamped, have been lost, or mislaid, and for allowing them Time to provide Admissions duly stamped; to give further Time to such Persons as have omitted to make and file Affidavits of the Execution of Indentures of Clerks to Attornies and Solicitors, and for indemnifying Deputy Lieutenants and Officers of the Militia, who have neglected to transmit Descriptions of their Qualifications to the Clerks of the Peace within the Time limited by Law, and for giving further Time for that Purpose. (Repealed by Promissory Oaths Act 1871 (34 & 35 Vict. c. 48))
Land Tax (Commissioners) Act 1790 (repealed)	30 Geo. 3. c. 13	28 April 1790
An Act for appointing Commissioners to put in Execution an Act of this Session of Parliament, intituled, "An Act for granting an Aid to His Majesty by a Land Tax, to be raised in Great Britain, for the Service of the Year One thousand seven hundred and ninety," (Note: Land Tax Act 1790 (30 Geo. 3. c. 2)) together with those named in Two former Acts, for appointing Commissioners of the Land Tax. (Repealed by Statute Law Revision Act 1871 (34 & 35 Vict. c. 116))
Discovery of Longitude at Sea Act 1790 (repealed)	30 Geo. 3. c. 14	28 April 1790
An Act for continuing the Encouragement and Reward of Persons making certain Discoveries for finding the Longitude at Sea, or making other useful Discoveries and Improvements in Navigation, and for making Experiments relating thereto; and for adding a Commissioner to execute the several Acts for the Discovery of the Longitude at Sea. (Repealed by Discovery of Longitude at Sea, etc. Act 1818 (58 Geo. 3. c. 20))
Loans or Exchequer Bills Act 1790 (repealed)	30 Geo. 3. c. 15	28 April 1790
An Act for raising a certain Sum of Money by Loans or Exchequer Bills, for the Service of the Year One thousand seven hundred and ninety. (Repealed by Statute Law Revision Act 1871 (34 & 35 Vict. c. 116))
Loans or Exchequer Bills (No. 2) Act 1790 (repealed)	30 Geo. 3. c. 16	28 April 1790
An Act for raising a further Sum of Money by Loans or Exchequer Bills, for the Service of the Year One thousand seven hundred and ninety. (Repealed by Statute Law Revision Act 1871 (34 & 35 Vict. c. 116))
Exchequer, etc. Courts (Scotland) Act 1790 (repealed)	30 Geo. 3. c. 17	7 May 1790
An Act for altering the Time appointed for holding the Summer Session in the Court of Session in Scotland, and for altering Whitsuntide and Lammas Terms in the Court of Exchequer in Scotland. (Repealed by Statute Law Revision Act 1871 (34 & 35 Vict. c. 116))
Continuance of Laws Act 1790 (repealed)	30 Geo. 3. c. 18	28 April 1790
An Act to continue the several Laws therein mentioned, relating to encouraging the Manufacture of Leather by lowering the Duty payable upon the Importation of Oak Bark, when the Price of such Bark shall exceed a certain Rate; to the prohibiting the Exportation of Tools and Utensils made use of in the Iron and Steel Manufactures of this Kingdom; and to prevent the seducing of Artificers and Workmen employed in those Manufactures to go into Parts beyond the Seas; and to the ascertaining the Strength of Spirits by Clarke's Hydrometer. (Repealed by Statute Law Revision Act 1871 (34 & 35 Vict. c. 116))
Papists Act 1790 (repealed)	30 Geo. 3. c. 19	28 April 1790
An Act for allowing further Time for Enrolment of Deeds and Wills made by Papists, and for Relief of Protestant Purchasers. (Repealed by Statute Law Revision Act 1871 (34 & 35 Vict. c. 116))
Saint Thomas Church, Bristol Act 1790	30 Geo. 3. c. 20	1 April 1790
An Act for rebuilding the Parish Church and Tower of St. Thomas, within the City of Bristol.
Norwich Water Act 1790 (repealed)	30 Geo. 3. c. 21	1 April 1790
An Act for better supplying the City of Norwich, and the Parts adjacent with Water. (Repealed by Norwich City Council Act 1984 (c. xxiii))
Colneis and Carlford Hundreds, Suffolk Poor Relief Act 1790 (repealed)	30 Geo. 3. c. 22	1 April 1790
An Act for the better Relief and Employment of the Poor, within the Hundreds of Colneis and Carlford, in the County of Suffolk. (Repealed by Colneis and Carlford Poor Relief Act 1813 (53 Geo. 3. c. cxxvii) and Statute Law Revision Act 1948 (11 & 12 Geo. 6. c. 62))
Post Horse Duties Act 1790 (repealed)	30 Geo. 3. c. 23	9 June 1790
An Act to continue for a limited Time, an Act made in the Twenty-seventh Year of the Reign of His present Majesty, (Note: Post Horse Duties Act 1787 (27 Geo. 3. c. 26)) intituled, "An Act to enable the Lord High Treasurer, or Commissioners of the Treasury for the Time being, to let to Farm the Duties granted by an Act made in the Twenty-fifth Year of His present Majesty's Reign, (Note: Duties on Post Horses, etc. Act 1785 (25 Geo. 3. c. 51)) on Horses let to hire for travelling Post, and by Time, to such Persons as should be willing to contract for the same." (Repealed by Statute Law Revision Act 1871 (34 & 35 Vict. c. 116))
Loans or Exchequer Bills (No. 2) Act 1790 (repealed)	30 Geo. 3. c. 24	9 June 1790
An Act for enabling His Majesty to raise the Sum of One Million, for the Uses and Purposes therein mentioned. (Repealed by Statute Law Revision Act 1871 (34 & 35 Vict. c. 116))
Honiton Improvement Act 1790 (repealed)	30 Geo. 3. c. 25	7 May 1790
An Act for paving and otherwise improving the Town of Honiton, in the County of Devon. (Repealed by Local Government Board's Provisional Orders Confirmation (No. 8) Act 1910 (10 Edw. 7 & 1 Geo. 5. c. lxxxv))
Auction Duty, etc. Act 1790 (repealed)	30 Geo. 3. c. 26	9 June 1790
An Act to exempt Goods and Chattels, imported from the Settlement of Yucatan, in South America, and sold by Auction in Great Britain, from the Duty imposed on such Sales, and for allowing a Drawback of the Duties on Goods exported to Yucatan. (Note: The Statute Law Revision Act 1861 listed the subject of this act as "exemption of goods imported from Yucatan from auction duty, etc.".) (Repealed by Statute Law Revision Act 1861 (24 & 25 Vict. c. 101))
Settlers in American Colonies Act 1790 (repealed)	30 Geo. 3. c. 27	9 June 1790
An Act for encouraging new Settlers in His Majesty's Colonies and Plantations in America. (Repealed by Statute Law Revision Act 1861 (24 & 25 Vict. c. 101))
Importation Act 1790 (repealed)	30 Geo. 3. c. 28	9 June 1790
An Act for permitting the Importation of Cashew Gum from His Majesty's West India Islands, upon Payment of the like Duty as is paid upon the Importation of Gum Arabic or Gum Senega. (Note: The Statute Law Revision Act 1861 listed the subject of this act as "duty on cashew gum imported from the West Indies".) (Repealed by Statute Law Revision Act 1861 (24 & 25 Vict. c. 101))
Importation and Exportation (No. 2) Act 1790 (repealed)	30 Geo. 3. c. 29	9 June 1790
An Act for amending an Act passed in the Twenty-seventh Year of the Reign of His present Majesty, intituled, "An Act for allowing the Importation and Exportation of certain Goods, Wares, and Merchandize, in the Ports of Kingston, Savannah la Mar; Montego Bay, and Santa Lucea, in the Island of Jamaica; in the Port of Saint George, in the Island of Grenada; in the Port of Roseau, in the Island of Dominica; and in the Port of Nassau, in the Island of New Providence, One of the Bahama Islands, under certain Regulations and Restrictions;" (Note: Importation and Exportation Act 1787 (27 Geo. 3. c. 27)) and for regulating the Duties on the Importation of Goods and Commodities, the Growth and Production of the Countries bordering on the Province of Quebec. (Note: An Index to the Statutes at Large lists the subject of this act as being the importation of foods of countries bordering on Quebec.) (Repealed by Customs Law Repeal Act 1825 (6 Geo. 4. c. 105))
Lotteries Act 1790 (repealed)	30 Geo. 3. c. 30	10 June 1790
An Act for granting to His Majesty a certain Sum of Money, to be raised by a Lottery. (Repealed by Statute Law Revision Act 1871 (34 & 35 Vict. c. 116))
Silver Plate Act 1790 (repealed)	30 Geo. 3. c. 31	9 June 1790
An Act to alter so much of an Act made in the Twelfth Year of the Reign of His late Majesty King George the Second, intituled, "An Act for the better preventing Frauds and Abuses in Gold and Silver Wares;" (Note: Plate (Offences) Act 1738 (12 Geo. 2. c. 26)) and also so much of another Act made in the Twenty-fourth Year of the Reign of His present Majesty, intituled, "An Act for granting to His Majesty certain Duties on all Gold and Silver Plate imported, and also certain Duties on all Gold and Silver Wrought Plate made in Great Britain," (Note: Plate Duties Act 1784 (24 Geo. 3. Sess. 2. c. 53)) as relates to the marking of Silver Wares. (Repealed by Hallmarking Act 1973 (c. 43))
Appropriation Act 1790 (repealed)	30 Geo. 3. c. 32	10 June 1790
An Act for granting to His Majesty a certain Sum of Money out of the Consolidated Fund, for applying certain Monies therein mentioned, for the Service of the Year One thousand seven hundred and ninety; and for further appropriating the Supplies granted in this Session of Parliament. (Repealed by Statute Law Revision Act 1871 (34 & 35 Vict. c. 116))
Slave Trade Act 1790 (repealed)	30 Geo. 3. c. 33	9 June 1790
An Act to amend and continue for a limited Time, several Acts of Parliament for regulating the shipping and carrying Slaves in British Vessels from the Coast of Africa. (Repealed by Statute Law Revision Act 1871 (34 & 35 Vict. c. 116))
American Loyalists, etc. Act 1790 (repealed)	30 Geo. 3. c. 34	9 June 1790
An Act for giving Relief to such Persons as have suffered in their Rights and Properties, during the late unhappy Dissensions in America, in consequence of their Loyalty to His Majesty, and Attachment to the British Government; for making Compensation to Persons who furnished Provisions, or other necessary Articles to the Army or Navy in America during the War, or whose Property was used, seized, or destroyed, for the carrying on the Public Service there; and also, for making Compensation to such Persons as have suffered in their Properties, in consequence of the Cession of the Province of East Florida to the King of Spain. (Repealed by Statute Law Revision Act 1871 (34 & 35 Vict. c. 116))
Parliamentary Elections Act 1790 (repealed)	30 Geo. 3. c. 35	10 June 1790
An Act to explain and amend an Act passed in the Twentieth Year of the Reign of His present Majesty, (Note: Parliamentary Elections Act 1780 (20 Geo. 3. c. 17)) touching the Election for Knights of the Shire to serve in Parliament for that Part of Great Britain called England. (Repealed by Statute Law Revision Act 1871 (34 & 35 Vict. c. 116))
Stage Coaches Act 1790 (repealed)	30 Geo. 3. c. 36	10 June 1790
An Act to alter, explain, and amend an Act made in the Twenty-eighth Year of the Reign of His present Majesty, intituled, "An Act for limiting the Number of Persons to be carried on the Outside of Stage Coaches or other Carriages," (Note: Stage Coaches Act 1788 (28 Geo. 3. c. 57)) and for regulating the Conduct of the Drivers and Guards thereof. (Repealed by Stage Coaches, etc. (Great Britain) Act 1810 (50 Geo. 3. c. 48))
Excise Act 1790 (repealed)	30 Geo. 3. c. 37	9 June 1790
An Act to continue Two Acts made in the Twenty-eighth (Note: Excise (No. 2) Act 1788 (28 Geo. 3. c. 46)) and Twenty-ninth (Note: Excise Duties Act 1789 (29 Geo. 3. c. 45)) Years of the Reign of His present Majesty, for discontinuing for a limited Time the several Duties payable in Scotland upon Low Wines and Spirits, and upon Worts, Wash, and other Liquors there used in the Distillation of Spirits, and for granting to His Majesty other Duties in lieu thereof; and for better regulating the Exportation of British made Spirits from England to Scotland, and from Scotland to England; and to continue for a limited Time an Act made in the Twenty-sixth Year of the Reign of His present Majesty, "To discontinue for a limited Time the Payment of the Duties upon Low Wines and Spirits for Home Consumption, and for granting and securing the due Payment of other Duties in lieu thereof; and for the better Regulation of the making and vending British Spirits; and for discontinuing for a limited Time certain Imposts and Duties upon Rum and Spirits imported from the West Indies," (Note: Excise (No. 3) Act 1786 (26 Geo. 3. c. 73)) and for amending the said Act made in the Twenty-ninth Year of His present Majesty's Reign. (Note: The Statute Law Revision Act 1861 listed the subject of this act as "Duties on spirits (Scotland)".) (Repealed by Statute Law Revision Act 1871 (34 & 35 Vict. c. 116))
Retail of Liquors Act 1790 (repealed)	30 Geo. 3. c. 38	10 June 1790
An Act for repealing the Duties upon Licences for retailing Wine and Sweets, and upon Licences for retailing distilled Spirituous Liquors, and for granting other Duties in lieu thereof. (Repealed by Statute Law Revision Act 1871 (34 & 35 Vict. c. 116) and Spirits Act 1880 (43 & 44 Vict. c. 24))
Allowances to Distillers (Scotland) Act 1790 (repealed)	30 Geo. 3. c. 39	9 June 1790
An Act for making Allowances to Distillers of Low Wines and Spirits from Malt, Corn, or Grain in Scotland, in respect to the Duties imposed by an Act made in the Twenty-fourth Year of the Reign of His present Majesty. (Note: Duties on Spirits Act 1784 (24 Geo. 3. Sess. 2. c. 46)) (Repealed by Statute Law Revision Act 1871 (34 & 35 Vict. c. 116))
Duty on Tobacco and Snuff Act 1790 (repealed)	30 Geo. 3. c. 40	10 June 1790
An Act to explain and amend an Act made in the last Session of Parliament, intituled, "An Act for repealing the Duties on Tobacco and Snuff, and for granting new Duties in lieu thereof." (Note: Duties on Tobacco and Snuff Act 1789 (29 Geo. 3. c. 68)) (Repealed by Tobacco Act 1840 (3 & 4 Vict. c. 18))
Importation (No. 2) Act 1790 (repealed)	30 Geo. 3. c. 41	10 June 1790
An Act for laying a Duty on the Importation from any of the Provinces in North America of Rape Seed, and all other Seeds used for extracting Oil; and for allowing the Importation from the said Provinces, of Rape Cakes, or Cakes made of Rape Seed, used for Manure, Duty free. (Note: The Statute Law Revision Act 1861 listed the subject of this act as "importations from North America of rape seed etc.".) (Repealed by Statute Law Revision Act 1861 (24 & 25 Vict. c. 101))
Importation and Exportation (No. 3) Act 1790 (repealed)	30 Geo. 3. c. 42	10 June 1790
An Act to continue for a limited Time certain Provisions contained in an Act made in this present Session of Parliament, intituled, "An Act for indemnifying all Persons who have been concerned in advising or carrying into Execution certain Orders of Council respecting the Importation and Exportation of Corn and Grain; and also, certain Orders issued by the Governor General of His Majesty's Colonies in America, and for preventing Suits in consequence of the same; and for making further Provisions relative thereto," (Note: Importation and Exportation Act 1790 (30 Geo. 3. c. 1)) relating to the Importation and Exportation of Corn and Grain; and to authorize His Majesty to permit the Exportation of Corn, Grain, Meal, or Flour, and to prohibit the Importation thereof on the Low Duties. (Repealed by Statute Law Revision Act 1871 (34 & 35 Vict. c. 116))
Customs Seizures Act 1790 (repealed)	30 Geo. 3. c. 43	10 June 1790
An Act to authorize the Commissioners of the Customs to defray Charges on Seizures out of His Majesty's Share of Seizures in general. (Repealed by Customs Law Repeal Act 1825 (6 Geo. 4. c. 105))
Annuity to Doctor Willis Act 1790 (repealed)	30 Geo. 3. c. 44	9 June 1790
An Act to enable His Majesty to settle a certain Annuity on the Reverend Francis Willis, Doctor of Physic. (Repealed by Statute Law Revision Act 1871 (34 & 35 Vict. c. 116))
Tontine Annuities Act 1790 (repealed)	30 Geo. 3. c. 45	10 June 1790
An Act for converting certain Annuities, to be attended with the Benefit of Survivorship in Classes, established by an Act of the last Session of Parliament, (Note: Tontine Annuities Act 1789 (29 Geo. 3. c. 41)) into certain Annuities, for an absolute Term of Years, and for enabling the Commissioners of the Treasury to nominate Lives for the Shares so converted. (Repealed by Statute Law Revision Act 1887 (50 & 51 Vict. c. 59))
Annuity (Penn's Descendants) Act 1790 (repealed)	30 Geo. 3. c. 46	9 June 1790
An Act for settling and securing a certain Annuity for the Use of the Heirs and Descendants of William Penn Esquire, the original Proprietor of the Province of Pennsylvania, (Note: William Penn.) in Consideration of the meritorious Services of the said William Penn, and of the Losses which his Family have sustained in consequence of the unhappy Dissensions in America. (Repealed by Statute Law Revision (No. 2) Act 1893 (56 & 57 Vict. c. 54))
Transportation Act 1790 (repealed)	30 Geo. 3. c. 47	9 June 1790
An Act for enabling His Majesty to authorize His Governor, or Lieutenant Governor of such Places beyond the Seas, to which Felons or other Offenders may be transported, to remit the Sentences of such Offenders. (Repealed by Statute Law Revision Act 1871 (34 & 35 Vict. c. 116))
Treason Act 1790 (repealed)	30 Geo. 3. c. 48	9 June 1790
An Act for discontinuing the Judgement which has been required by Law to be given against Women convicted of certain Crimes, and substituting another Judgement in lieu thereof. (Repealed by Crime and Disorder Act 1998 (c. 37))
Workhouses Act 1790 (repealed)	30 Geo. 3. c. 49	9 June 1790
An Act to empower Justices and other Persons to visit Parish Workhouses or Poor Houses, and examine and certify the State and Condition of the Poor therein to the Quarter Sessions. (Repealed by Poor Law Act 1927 (17 & 18 Geo. 5. c. 14))
Land Revenues of the Crown Act 1790 (repealed)	30 Geo. 3. c. 50	10 June 1790
An Act to continue and amend an Act made in the Twenty-sixth Year of the Reign of His present Majesty, intituled, "An Act for appointing Commissioners to enquire into the State and Condition of the Woods, Forests, and Land Revenues belonging to the Crown, and to sell or alienate Fee Farm and other unimproveable Rents." (Note: Crown Land Revenues, etc. Act 1786 (26 Geo. 3. c. 87)) (Repealed by Statute Law Revision Act 1871 (34 & 35 Vict. c. 116))
Crown Lands at Catterick and Tunstall, Yorkshire Act 1790 (repealed)	30 Geo. 3. c. 51	9 June 1790
An Act for divesting out of the Crown the Reversion in Fee of and in certain Hereditaments, heretofore the Estate of Sir Roger Strickland Knight, deceased, in Catterick and Tunstall, in the County of York, and for vesting the same in the several Persons entitled to the said Hereditaments; and for extinguishing and destroying a certain Term of One hundred Years, for which the said Hereditaments were limited in Trust for His late Majesty King George the First, His Heirs and Successors. (Repealed by Statute Law (Repeals) Act 1978 (c. 45))
River Ouse Navigation Act 1790	30 Geo. 3. c. 52	28 April 1790
An Act for improving, continuing, and extending the Navigation of the River Ouse, from Lewes Bridge, at the Town of Lewes, to Hammer Bridge, in the Parish of Cuckfield, and to the Extent of the said Parish of Cuckfield; and also of a Branch of the said River to Shortbridge, in the Parish of Fletching, in the County of Sussex.
Westminster Improvements Act 1790 (repealed)	30 Geo. 3. c. 53	9 June 1790
An Act to alter, explain, amend, and render more effectual, several Acts made for paving, cleansing, and lighting the Squares, Streets, Lanes, and other Places within the City and Liberty of Westminster, and Parts adjacent, and for putting certain Streets therein mentioned, commonly called Optional Streets, under the Management of Parochial Committees, subject to the Control of the Commissioners appointed by, or in pursuance of the said several Acts; and for removing and preventing Nuisances, Annoyances, Obstructions, and Encroachments, in the said Streets and other Places, and for other Purposes. (Repealed by Tothill Fields Improvement Act 1825 (6 Geo. 4. c. cxxxiv), London Government (Borough of Holborn) Order in Council 1901 (SR&O 1901/269) and London Government (City of Westminster) Order in Council 1901 (SR&O 1901/278))
Westminster Fish Market Act 1790 (repealed)	30 Geo. 3. c. 54	9 June 1790
An Act for vesting the Estate and Property of the Trustees of Westminster Fish Market in the Marine Society, for the Purposes therein mentioned; and for discontinuing the Powers of the said Trustees. (Repealed by Sea Fisheries Act 1868 (31 & 32 Vict. c. 45))
Hubberston and Pill, Pembroke, Docks and Piers Act 1790	30 Geo. 3. c. 55	9 June 1790
An Act to enable Sir William Hamilton, (Note: Sir William Hamilton.) Knight of the Most Honourable Order of the Bath, his Heirs and Assigns, to make and provide Quays, Docks, Piers, and other Erections, and to establish a Market with proper Roads and Avenues thereto respectively, within the Manor or Lordship of Hubberstone and Pill, in the County of Pembroke.
Cromford Canal Act 1790	30 Geo. 3. c. 56	1 April 1790
An Act to alter and amend an Act passed in the last Session of Parliament, (Note: Cromford Canal Act 1789 (29 Geo. 3. c. 74)) for making and maintaining a Navigable Canal from, or from near to Cromford Bridge, in the County of Derby, to join and communicate with the Erewash Canal, at or near Langley Bridge, and also a Collateral Cut from the said intended Canal, at or near Codnor Park Mill, to or near Pinxton Mill, in the said County.
Ipswich and Stowmarket Navigation Act 1790 (repealed)	30 Geo. 3. c. 57	1 April 1790
An Act for making and maintaining a Navigable Communication between Stowmarket and Ipswich, in the County of Suffolk. (Repealed by Navigation between Stowmarket and Ipswich Act 1846 (9 & 10 Vict. c. cvi), Land Drainage Act 1930 (20 & 21 Geo. 5. c. 44) and Ipswich and Stowmarket Navigation Acts Revocation Order 1934 (SR&O 1934/282))
Edington, Somerset Drainage, etc. Act 1790	30 Geo. 3. c. 58	28 April 1790
An Act for draining, dividing, and enclosing certain Moors, Commons, or Waste Lands, called Edington, otherwise Burtle Moor, East Heath, West Heath, and Clyde Batch, within the Hamlet of Edington, and Parish of Moorlinch, in the County of Somerset.
Anglesey Drainage Act 1790	30 Geo. 3. c. 59	28 April 1790
An Act for more effectually embanking the Marsh called Malldraeth and Corsddaugau, in the County of Anglesey, and draining and preserving the same, and the enclosed Low Lands contiguous thereto.
Stourbridge and Birmingham and Fazeley Canal Act 1790 (repealed)	30 Geo. 3. c. 60	7 May 1790
An Act for effectually carrying into Execution Two Acts of the Sixteenth (Note: Stourbridge Canal Act 1776 (16 Geo. 3. c. 28)) and Twenty-fifth Years (Note: Birmingham Canal Navigation Act 1785 (25 Geo. 3. c. 99)) of His present Majesty, for making and maintaining a Navigable Canal from the Stourbridge Navigation to the Birmingham, and Birmingham and Fazely Canal Navigations, in the Counties of Worcester and Stafford. (Repealed by Birmingham and Dudley Canal Consolidation Act 1846 (9 & 10 Vict. c. cclxix))
Plymouth Dock to Torpoint Ferry Act 1790	30 Geo. 3. c. 61	7 May 1790
An Act for authorizing and enabling the Right Honourable George Earl of Mount Edgcumbe, and Reginald Pole Carew Esquire, to establish and maintain a Common Ferry over and across the River Tamer, between a certain Place North of Plymouth Dock, in the Parish of Stoke Damarel, in the County of Devon and Torpoint, in the Parish of Antony Saint Jacob, otherwise Antony in the East, in the County of Cornwall.
Truro Streets Act 1790 (repealed)	30 Geo. 3. c. 62	7 May 1790
An Act for paving, cleansing, lighting, and widening the Streets, Lanes, and Passages; for removing and preventing Encroachments, Nuisances, and Annoyances; and for regulating the Porters and Drivers of Carts within the Borough of Truro, and Part of the adjoining Parishes in the County of Cornwall. (Repealed by Truro Improvement Act 1835 (5 & 6 Will. 4. c. c))
Bradford, Yorkshire Water Supply Act 1790	30 Geo. 3. c. 63	7 May 1790
An Act for preserving the Works made for supplying the Town of Bradford, in the County of York, and Part of the Township of Horton, in the Parish of Bradford aforesaid, with Water; for the more easy Recovery of the Rents for the said Water, and to enable the Proprietors thereof to borrow Money for the improving such Works.
Ramsgate Chapel of Ease Act 1790	30 Geo. 3. c. 64	7 May 1790
An Act for establishing a Chapel at Ramsgate, in the Parish of Saint Laurence, in the Isle of Thanet, in the County of Kent, as a Chapel of Ease to the Church of the same Parish.
Leeds and Liverpool Canal Act 1790	30 Geo. 3. c. 65	9 June 1790
An Act to enable the Company of Proprietors of the Canal Navigation from Leeds to Liverpool, to vary the Line of the said Canal Navigation, and to raise a further Sum of Money for the Purpose of completing the said Canal Navigation, and for other Purposes.
Peterborough Streets Act 1790 (repealed)	30 Geo. 3. c. 66	9 June 1790
An Act for paving and otherwise improving the City and Township of Peterborough. (Repealed by Peterborough Improvement and Cemetery Act 1850 (13 & 14 Vict. c. xciii))
Durham Streets Act 1790 (repealed)	30 Geo. 3. c. 67	9 June 1790
An Act for paving, cleansing, lighting, watching, and regulating the Streets, Lanes, Ways, and Public Passages and Places within the City of Durham and Borough of Framwelgate, and the Suburbs thereof, and Streets thereto adjoining; for removing and preventing Nuisances, Annoyances, Encroachments, and Obstructions therein; for widening and rendering more commodious several of the said Streets, Lanes, Ways, and Public Passages and Places; and for regulating and improving the Markets within the said City and Suburbs. (Repealed by Local Government Board's Provisional Orders Confirmation (No. 11) Act 1905 (5 Edw. 7. c. cvii))
Leeds Water Supply Act 1790	30 Geo. 3. c. 68	9 June 1790
An Act for better supplying the Town and Neighbourhood of Leeds, in the County of York, with Water, and for more effectually lighting and cleansing the Streets and other Places within the said Town and Neighbourhood; and removing and preventing Nuisances, Annoyances, Encroachments, and Obstructions therein.
Saint James Church, Clerkenwell Act 1790	30 Geo. 3. c. 69	9 June 1790
An Act for amending and enlarging the Powers of and rendering more effectual an Act made in the Twenty-eighth Year of the Reign of His present Majesty, intituled, "An Act for pulling down the Church of Saint James at Clerkenwell, in the County of Middlesex, and for building a new Church, and making a new Church Yard or Cemetery in the said Parish, with convenient Avenues and Passages thereto;" (Note: Clerkenwell Church Act 1788 (28 Geo. 3. c. 10)) and for purchasing Pentonville Chapel, and making the same a Chapel of Ease to the said Church.
Saint James, Westminster Improvement Act 1790 (repealed)	30 Geo. 3. c. 70	9 June 1790
An Act to amend an Act of the last Session of Parliament (Note: Saint James, Westminster Improvement Act 1789 (29 Geo. 3. c. 47)) for providing an additional Burial Ground for the Parish of Saint James, Westminster, and erecting a Chapel adjoining thereto; and also a House for the Residence of a Clergyman to officiate in burying the Dead. (Repealed by London Government (City of Westminster) Order in Council 1901 (SR&O 1901/278))
Saint John Church, Hackney Act 1790 (repealed)	30 Geo. 3. c. 71	9 June 1790
An Act for taking down the Church and Tower belonging to the Parish of Saint John at Hackney, in the County of Middlesex; and for building another Church and Tower for the Use of the said Parish; and for making an additional Cemetery or Church Yard. (Repealed by London Government (Borough of Hackney) Order in Council 1901 (SR&O 1901/268))
Banbury Church Act 1790	30 Geo. 3. c. 72	9 June 1790
An Act for taking down the Church, Chancel, and Tower, belonging to the Parish of Banbury, in the County of Oxford, and for re-building the same.
Forth and Clyde and Monkland Canal Act 1790	30 Geo. 3. c. 73	9 June 1790
An Act for forming a Junction between the Forth and Clyde Navigation, and the Monkland Navigation, and for altering, enlarging, and explaining, several former Acts passed, for making and maintaining the said Navigations.
Waterbeach Level Drainage Act 1790	30 Geo. 3. c. 74	9 June 1790
An Act to alter and amend an Act made in the Fourteenth Year of the Reign of His late Majesty King George the Second, intituled, "An Act for the effectual Draining and Preservation of Waterbeach Level, in the County of Cambridge, and to establish an Agreement made between the Lord of the Manor of Waterbeach cum Denny, and the Commoners within the said Manor."
Severn Navigation Act 1790	30 Geo. 3. c. 75	9 June 1790
An Act to enable the Company of Proprietors of the Staffordshire and Worcestershire Navigation to improve the Navigation of the River Severn from Stourport, in the County of Worcester, to a Place called Diglis, near the City of Worcester.
Hans Town, Chelsea Improvement Act 1790 (repealed)	30 Geo. 3. c. 76	9 June 1790
An Act for forming and keeping in Repair the Streets and other Public Passages and Places within a certain District in the Parish of Saint Luke, Chelsea, in the County of Middlesex, called Hans Town, and for otherwise improving the same. (Repealed by Statute Law (Repeals) Act 2013 (c. 2))
Coventry Streets Act 1790	30 Geo. 3. c. 77	9 June 1790
An Act for the better paving, cleansing, lighting, and watching, the City of Coventry, and the Suburbs thereof; and removing and preventing Nuisances and Annoyances therein; and for regulating the Public Wells and Pumps within the said City and Suburbs.
Newcastle and Sunderland Coals Act 1790	30 Geo. 3. c. 78	9 June 1790
An Act to continue an Act made in the Sixth Year of His present Majesty's Reign, intituled, "An Act to regulate the Loading of Ships with Coals in the Ports of Newcastle and Sunderland." (Note: Coal Loading (Newcastle and Sunderland) Act 1766 (6 Geo. 3. c. 22))
East Grinstead Church Act 1790	30 Geo. 3. c. 79	9 June 1790
An Act for re-building the Parish Church of East Grinstead, in the County of Sussex.
Streatham Poor Relief Act 1790 (repealed)	30 Geo. 3. c. 80	9 June 1790
An Act for providing a Workhouse for, and for the better Relief and Employment of the Poor of the Parish of Streatham, in the County of Surrey; and for appointing an additional Overseer for the better Government of the Poor of the said Parish. (Repealed by London Government (Borough of Wandsworth) Order in Council 1901 (SR&O 1901/222))
Manchester Poor Relief Act 1790 (repealed)	30 Geo. 3. c. 81	9 June 1790
An Act for providing a new Poor House for, and for the better Relief and Government of the Poor of the Township of Manchester, in the County of Lancaster. (Repealed by Statute Law (Repeals) Act 2013 (c. 2))
Glamorganshire Canal Act 1790 (repealed)	30 Geo. 3. c. 82	9 June 1790
An Act for making and maintaining a Navigable Canal from Merthyr Tidvile, to and through a Place called The Bank, near the Town of Cardiff, in the County of Glamorgan. (Repealed by Mid Glamorgan County Council Act 1987 (c. vii))
Ouse Navigation Act 1790 or the Haling Act 1790	30 Geo. 3. c. 83	7 May 1790
An Act for empowering Persons navigating Boats, Barges, and other Vessels, in the River Ouze, in the County of Norfolk, to hale or tow with Horses or other Beasts on the Banks or Sea Walls of the said River, and for making Satisfaction to the Owners of the said Banks or Sea Walls.
Liston Essex Roads Act 1790	30 Geo. 3. c. 84	1 April 1790
An Act to empower William Henry Campbell Esquire, to shut up a Road and Foot Paths in the Parish of Liston, in the County of Essex; and to oblige him to make and keep in Repair for the future, another Road and Foot Path in lieu thereof.
Norwich to Trowse Road Act 1790 (repealed)	30 Geo. 3. c. 85	1 April 1790
An Act for continuing an Act of the Tenth Year of the Reign of His present Majesty, (Note: Norwich to Trowse Road Act 1770 (10 Geo. 3. c. 54)) for amending the Road from Saint Stephen's Gate, (Note: St Stephen's Gate, St Stephens Street, Norwich, Norfolk. The gate was demolished in 1793. 52°37′27″N 1°17′26″E) in the City of Norwich, to Block Hill, in Trowse, (Note: Crown Point, Block Hill, Trowse, Norfolk. 52°36′41″N 1°19′18″E) at the Angle, where the Road divides to Bixley (Note: Bixley, Norfolk.) and Kirby, (Note: Kirby Bedon, Norfolk.) in the County of Norfolk. (Repealed by Statute Law (Repeals) Act 2008 (c. 12))
Norwich to Yarmouth Road Act 1790 (repealed)	30 Geo. 3. c. 86	1 April 1790
An Act for continuing an Act of the Ninth Year of the Reign of His present Majesty, (Note: Norwich to Yarmouth Road Act 1769 (9 Geo. 3. c. 68)) for amending the Road from Bishopsgate Bridge, in the City of Norwich, to a Stone formerly called the Two Mile Stone, where the Norwich Road joins the Caister Causeway, Two Miles and a Half short of the Town of Great Yarmouth. (Repealed by Norwich and Great Yarmouth Road Act 1813 (53 Geo. 3. c. cxxx) and Road from Norwich to the Caister Causeway Act 1831 (1 Will. 4. c. lxv))
Norwich to New Buckenham Road Act 1790 (repealed)	30 Geo. 3. c. 87	1 April 1790
An Act for continuing an Act of the Twelfth Year of His present Majesty, (Note: Norwich to New Buckenham Road Act 1772 (12 Geo. 3. c. 95)) for repairing and widening the Road from Berstreet Gates, (Note: Berstrete Gate, Ber Street, Norwich. The gate was demolished in 1808. 52°37′16″N 1°18′04″E) in the City of Norwich, to New Buckenham, (Note: New Buckenham, Norfolk.) in the County of Norfolk. (Repealed by Norwich and New Buckenham Road Act 1833 (3 & 4 Will. 4. c. xxxix))
Chester and Derby Roads Act 1790 (repealed)	30 Geo. 3. c. 88	1 April 1790
An Act to enlarge the Term and Powers of an Act passed in the Tenth Year of the Reign of His present Majesty, (Note: Chester and Derby Roads Act 1770 (10 Geo. 3. c. 98)) for repairing, widening, and altering the Road from Macclesfield, in the County of Chester, to the Turnpike Road at Randle Carr Lane Head, in Fernilee, in the County of Derby, leading to Chapel in the Frith. (Repealed by Hurdsfield and Chapel-en-le-Frith Road (Derbyshire) Act 1833 (3 & 4 Will. 4. c. lix))
Hertfordshire and Huntingdonshire Roads Act 1790 (repealed)	30 Geo. 3. c. 89	1 April 1790
An Act for continuing the Term, and altering and enlarging the Powers of certain Acts of Parliament, for repairing the Roads from Royston, in the County of Hertford, to Wandesford Bridge, in the County of Huntingdon, and from the Town of Huntingdon to the Causeway at or near the West End of the Town of Somersham, in the County of Huntingdon, so far as relates to the Middle and South Divisions, and separate District of the said Road. (Repealed by Road from Royston to Wandesford Bridge Act 1815 (55 Geo. 3. c. xxxv) and Royston and Wandesford Bridge Road Act 1822 (3 Geo. 4. c. lxviii) (Note: Cited without a regnal year, as "G 4 c lxviii", in the Chronological Table of the Statutes.))
Goudhurst Roads Act 1790 (repealed)	30 Geo. 3. c. 90	1 April 1790
An Act for enlarging the Term and Powers of an Act of the Eighth Year of His present Majesty, (Note: Goudhurst Roads Act 1768 (8 Geo. 3. c. 35)) for amending, widening, and keeping in Repair, several Roads leading to and through the Town of Goudhurst, in the County of Kent. (Repealed by Roads to and through Goudhurst Act 1832 (2 & 3 Will. 4. c. lxxiv))
Pembroke Roads Act 1790 (repealed)	30 Geo. 3. c. 91	1 April 1790
An Act for enlarging the Term of an Act of the Eleventh Year of His present Majesty, (Note: Pembroke Roads Act 1771 (11 Geo. 3. c. 96)) for repairing, widening, and keeping in Repair, several Roads leading from Tavernspite to the Towns of Pembroke and Tenby, and to Hubberston Haking, in the County of Pembroke. (Repealed by Roads from Tavernspite (Pembrokeshire) Act 1808 (48 Geo. 3. c. cxxxix))
Leicester Roads Act 1790 (repealed)	30 Geo. 3. c. 92	1 April 1790
An Act to enlarge the Term and Powers of an Act passed in the Twenty-eighth Year of the Reign of His present Majesty, (Note: Leicester Roads Act 1788 (28 Geo. 3. c. 100)) for repairing and widening the Road from the Leicester and Welford Turnpike Road, in the Counties of Leicester and Northampton, near Foston Lane, to the Turnpike Road leading from Hinckley to Ashby de la Zouch, in the said County of Leicester; and for repairing and widening Two Pieces of Road, called Hunt's Lane and Wood Lane, in the Parishes of Desford and Newbold Verdon. (Repealed by Roads in Parishes of Desford and Newbold (Leicestershire) Act 1831 (1 Will. 4. c. xxxviii))
Fife Roads Act 1790 (repealed)	30 Geo. 3. c. 93	1 April 1790
An Act for making and repairing the Road from Newmiln Bridge, by Foodie's Mill, Inverkeithing, Aberdour, Kirkcaldy, Gallatown, and Cameron Bridge, to Craill, and other Roads in the County of Fife. (Repealed by Fife, Kinross, Perth and Clackmannan Roads Act 1810 (50 Geo. 3. c. lxxii) and Fife Turnpike Roads Act 1829 (10 Geo. 4. c. lxxxiv))
Cambridge Roads Act 1790 (repealed)	30 Geo. 3. c. 94	1 April 1790
An Act for enlarging the Term of several Acts made for repairing the Roads from Stump Cross to Newmarket Heath, and from Stump Cross aforesaid, to the End of the Town of Trumpington next to Shelford, and from Shelford Pound to Wittlesford; and for making more effectual Provision for repairing the said Roads, and also One Mile of the Road between Trumpington and Cambridge, commencing at the South End of Trumpington aforesaid; and for amending the Road from Chesterford Bridge, to the End of Wittlesford, next to Shelford, all in the County of Cambridge. (Repealed by Stumpcross and Newmarket Heath Road Act 1813 (53 Geo. 3. c. xciv) and Stumpcross Roads Act 1841 (4 & 5 Vict. c. xx))
Dorset Roads Act 1790 (repealed)	30 Geo. 3. c. 95	1 April 1790
An Act to enlarge the Term and Powers of so much of an Act made in the Ninth Year of the Reign of His present Majesty (Note: Dorset Roads Act 1769 (9 Geo. 3. c. 47)) as relates to the amending, widening, altering, clearing, and keeping in Repair several Roads leading from the Borough of Dorchester, in the County of Dorset. (Repealed by Wool Bridge and Dorchester Road Act 1830 (11 Geo. 4 & 1 Will. 4. c. xxiv))
Wiltshire Roads Act 1790 (repealed)	30 Geo. 3. c. 96	1 April 1790
An Act for enlarging the Terms and altering the Powers of Two Acts made in the Sixteenth Year of the Reign of His late Majesty, (Note: Wiltshire Roads Act 1742 (16 Geo. 2. c. 10)) and in the Ninth Year of the Reign of His present Majesty, (Note: Wilts Roads Act 1769 (9 Geo. 3. c. 48)) for repairing the Roads leading from Marlborough, through West Kennett, to Sheppard's Shord; and from the Hare and Hounds in Beckhampton, to the Top of Cherrill Hill; and from the Town of Avebury, to the Cross Way at Beckhampton; and from the Turnpike Gate at Avebury, to Wroughton; and from the North Side of Swindon, to the Carpenter's Arms in Blunsden, in the County of Wilts; and for diverting, turning, and altering Part of the said Roads; and for repairing, and widening the Road on the West Side of the Three Barrows, from the Direction Post there, on the New Road leading from Beckhampton to Devizes, to the Distance of One Mile from the said Direction Post Westward. (Repealed by Road from Beckhampton and from Swindon Act 1799 (39 Geo. 3. c. xlix))
Surrey and Sussex Roads Act 1790 (repealed)	30 Geo. 3. c. 97	1 April 1790
An Act for continuing the Term and enlarging, altering, and amending the Powers of an Act made in the Tenth Year of His present Majesty, (Note: Surrey and Sussex Roads Act 1770 (10 Geo. 3. c. 76)) for repairing, widening, and keeping in Repair the Road from New Chappell, in the County of Surrey, over Copthorn, in the County of Sussex, through Lindfield, to the Town of Ditchling, up to the Top of Ditchling Bost Hills, in the said County of Sussex. (Repealed by Road from New Chappel to Brighton Act 1830 (11 Geo. 4 & 1 Will. 4. c. xviii))
Wiltshire Roads (No. 2) Act 1790 (repealed)	30 Geo. 3. c. 98	1 April 1790
An Act for repairing and widening the Road from Rowde Ford to Red Hill, and from Chittoe Heath to the Town of Calne, in the County of Wilts; and for repealing Three Acts made in the Second (Note: Wiltshire Highway Act 1728 (2 Geo. 2. c. 12)) and Twenty-fifth (Note: Wiltshire Roads Act 1751 (25 Geo. 2. c. 5)) Years of the Reign of His late Majesty King George the Second, and in the Twenty-third Year of His present Majesty, (Note: Wiltshire Roads Act 1783 (23 Geo. 3. c. 111)) for repairing the Highways between Sheppard's Shord and Horsley Upright Gate, leading down Bagdown Hill, in the County of Wilts, and other ruinous Parts of the Highways thereunto adjacent. (Repealed by Roads to and from Devizes Act 1820 (1 Geo. 4. c. lxix))
Yorkshire Roads Act 1790 (repealed)	30 Geo. 3. c. 99	1 April 1790
An Act for continuing the Term and altering and enlarging the Powers of certain Acts made for repairing the Road from Keighley, in the West Riding of the County of York, to Kirkby in Kendall, in the County of Westmorland; so far as relates to such Part of the said Road as lies within the County of York. (Repealed by Keighley to Kirkby Road (Yorkshire District) Act 1823 (4 Geo. 4. c. xlix))
Stafford Roads Act 1790 (repealed)	30 Geo. 3. c. 100	28 April 1790
An Act for making, amending, and keeping in Repair the Road, from Fosbrook, in the Parish of Dillorn, through Dillorn, and from thence to or near to Chedleton, in the County of Stafford. (Repealed by Roads from Fosbrook to Chedleton (Staffordshire) Act 1811 (51 Geo. 3. c. lxxvi) and Roads in the Neighbourhood of Cheadle Act 1831 (1 Will. 4. c. lxviii))
Bromsgrove to Birmingham Road Act 1790 (repealed)	30 Geo. 3. c. 101	28 April 1790
An Act to enlarge the Terms and Powers of Three several Acts made in the Thirteenth Year of the Reign of King George the First, (Note: Bromsgrove and Birmingham Roads Act 1726 (13 Geo. 1. c. 15)) the Twenty-first Year of the Reign of King George the Second, (Note: Bromsgrove to Birmingham Roads Act 1747 (21 Geo. 2. c. 22)) and the Eleventh Year of the Reign of His present Majesty, (Note: Worcester and Warwick Roads Act 1771 (11 Geo. 3. c. 92)) for repairing the Road leading from the Town of Bromsgrove, in the County of Worcester, to the Town of Birmingham, in the County of Warwick. (Repealed by Bromsgrove and Birmingham Road Act 1819 (59 Geo. 3. c. xlix))
Worcester Salop and Stafford Roads Act 1790 (repealed)	30 Geo. 3. c. 102	28 April 1790
An Act for making, amending, widening, and keeping in Repair, a Road from Eve Hill near Dudley, to the New Inn, in the Parish of Pattingham, and from the Turnpike Road at or near Street End, in the Parish of Kingswinford, to the Turnpike Road leading from Dudley to Wolverhampton, in the Counties of Worcester, Salop, and Stafford. (Repealed by Dudley and New Inn District of Roads Act 1832 (2 & 3 Will. 4. c. lxxxv))
Huntingdonshire Roads Act 1790 (repealed)	30 Geo. 3. c. 103	28 April 1790
An Act to continue the Term and alter and enlarge the Powers of an Act of the Tenth Year of His present Majesty, (Note: Bedford and Hunts Roads Act 1770 (10 Geo. 3. c. 83)) for repairing the Road from Biggleswade, in the County of Bedford, through Bugden and Alconbury, to the Top of Alconbury Hill, and from Bugden to Huntingdon, and from Cross Hall to Great Stoughton Common, in the County of Huntingdon; and also the Road leading out of the aforesaid Road at or near the Ferry House, in the Parish of Tempsford, to and through Little Barford, Eynesbury, and Saint Neots, to the Turnpike Road at the End of Cross Hall Lane. (Repealed by Biggleswade and Alconbury Hill Road Act 1816 (56 Geo. 3. c. lii))
Norwich and Watton Road Act 1790 (repealed)	30 Geo. 3. c. 104	7 May 1790
An Act for continuing and amending an Act of the Tenth Year of His present Majesty, (Note: Norwich and Watton Road Act 1770 (10 Geo. 3. c. 77)) for amending and widening the Road from Saint Stephen's Gate, in the County of the City of Norwich to the Windmill in the Town of Watton, in the County of Norfolk. (Repealed by Norwich and Watton Road Act 1833 (3 & 4 Will. 4. c. xv))
Linlithgow Roads Act 1790 (repealed)	30 Geo. 3. c. 105	7 May 1790
An Act to continue the Term and alter the Powers of so much of Two Acts made in the Twenty-fifth (Note: Post Roads in Scotland Act 1751 (25 Geo. 2. c. 28)) and Thirty-first (Note: Edinburgh and Glasgow Roads Act 1757 (31 Geo. 2. c. 55)) Years of the Reign of His late Majesty, for repairing several Roads in the Counties of Linlithgow and Stirling, as relates to the Roads lying within the County of Linlithgow. (Repealed by Road from Carlowrie Bridge Act 1809 (49 Geo. 3. c. xxxviii) (Note: Incorrectly cited as "49 Geo. 3. c. xxxvii" in the Chronological Table of the Statutes.))
Abingdon to Swinford Road Act 1790 (repealed)	30 Geo. 3. c. 106	7 May 1790
An Act for enlarging the Term and Powers of an Act passed in the Eighth Year of the Reign of His present Majesty King George the Third, (Note: Abingdon to Swinford Road Act 1768 (8 Geo. 3. c. 61)) for repairing and widening the Road from the Mayor's Stone in Abingdon, in the County of Berks, through Cumner, to the ancient Horse Road at Swinford, in the said County. (Repealed by Roads from Oxford over Botley Causeway Act 1814 (54 Geo. 3. c. clxxxvi) and Statute Law (Repeals) Act 2013 (c. 2))
Cheadle to Butterton Moor Road Act 1790 (repealed)	30 Geo. 3. c. 107	9 June 1790
An Act to continue the Term, and alter and enlarge the Powers of an Act passed in the Ninth Year of the Reign of His present Majesty, (Note: Cheadle to Butterton Moor Road Act 1769 (9 Geo. 3. c. 80)) for repairing and widening the Road from Cheadle (Note: Cheadle, Staffordshire.) to Botham House, (Note: Bottomhouse, Staffordshire. 53°04′19″N 1°56′23″W) and from thence to Butterton Moor End, (Note: Near Butterton, Staffordshire.) in the County of Stafford. (Repealed by Cheadle to Butterton Moor Road Act 1810 (50 Geo. 3. c. civ) and Roads in the Neighbourhood of Cheadle Act 1831 (1 Will. 4. c. lxviii))
Linlithgow and Stirling Roads Act 1790 (repealed)	30 Geo. 3. c. 108	9 June 1790
An Act to continue the Term and alter the Powers of so much of Two Acts made in the Twenty-fifth and Thirty-first Years of the Reign of His late Majesty for repairing several Roads in the Counties of Linlithgow and Stirling, as relates to the Roads lying within the County of Stirling; and for repairing the Road from Loanhead to Saint Ninian's, in the said County of Stirling. (Repealed by Roads in Stirling Act 1811 (51 Geo. 3. c. ci))
Stirling and Dumbarton Roads Act 1790 (repealed)	30 Geo. 3. c. 109	9 June 1790
An Act for repairing several Roads in the Counties of Stirling and Dumbarton. (Repealed by Stirling, Dumbarton, and Perth County Roads Act 1798 (38 Geo. 3. c. xxiv))
Denbigh and Flint Roads Act 1790 (repealed)	30 Geo. 3. c. 110	9 June 1790
An Act for more effectually amending, widening, and keeping in Repair, the Road from the Town of Denbigh, to the Turnpike Road between Northop and Holywell, and from Afton Wen, to the Town of Mold, in the Counties of Denbigh and Flint. (Repealed by Denbigh and Mold Road and Branch Act 1833 (3 & 4 Will. 4. c. xxvii))
Salop Roads Act 1790 (repealed)	30 Geo. 3. c. 111	9 June 1790
An Act for enlarging the Term and Powers of an Act passed in the Ninth Year of the Reign of His present Majesty King George the Third, (Note: Salop Roads Act 1769 (9 Geo. 3. c. 55)) for repairing and widening the Road from the End of the Turnpike Road in Shawbury, in the County of Salop, to Drayton in Hales, in the said County, and from thence to Newcastle under Line, in the County of Stafford, and from Shawbury aforesaid, to the Turnpike Road in High Ercall, in the said County of Salop, and from Shawbury aforesaid, to Wem, in the said County, and from thence to the Turnpike Road in Sandford, in the said County. (Repealed by Road from Newcastle-under-Lyme to Market Drayton Act 1832 (2 & 3 Will. 4. c. lv) and Shawbury District of Roads (Salop.) Act 1832 (2 & 3 Will. 4. c. lxxv))
Stafford and Chester Roads Act 1790 (repealed)	30 Geo. 3. c. 112	9 June 1790
An Act for enlarging the Term and Powers of an Act passed in the Tenth Year of the Reign of His present Majesty, (Note: Stafford and Cheshire Roads Act 1770 (10 Geo. 3. c. 66)) for repairing and widening the Road from Tunstall, in the County of Stafford, to Bosley, in the County of Chester, and from Great Chell to Shelton, in the said County of Stafford. (Repealed by Tunstall and Bosley, and Great Chell and Shelton Roads (Staffordshire, Cheshire) Act 1833 (3 & 4 Will. 4. c. liv))
Derby Nottinghamshire Roads Act 1790 (repealed)	30 Geo. 3. c. 113	9 June 1790
An Act to enlarge the Term and Powers of an Act made in the Fourth Year of the Reign of His present Majesty, (Note: Derby and Nottinghamshire Roads Act 1764 (4 Geo. 3. c. 67)) for repairing, widening, and keeping in Repair, the High Roads leading from Alfreton, in the County of Derby, through Carter Lane, to a certain Place in the Town of Mansfield, called Stockwell, and from the Bridle Gate, at the Division of the Liberties of Blackwell and Hucknall, through the Town of Sutton in Ashfield, to the Mansfield and Newark Turnpike, at or near Python Hill, in the Forest of Sherwood, in the County of Nottingham. (Repealed by Alfreton and Mansfield Road Act 1812 (52 Geo. 3. c. vii) and Annual Turnpike Acts Continuance Act 1876 (39 & 40 Vict. c. 39))
Bedford and Buckinghamshire Roads Act 1790 (repealed)	30 Geo. 3. c. 114	9 June 1790
An Act for amending, widening, and keeping in Repair the Road from the East End of Bromham Bridge, in the County of Bedford, to the Turnpike Road leading from Wellingborough to Olney, in the County of Bucks; and also the Road from the said Turnpike Road at or near the South End of the Town of Olney aforesaid to the Turnpike Road leading from Northampton to Newport Pagnell, in the same County. (Repealed by Bedford and Newport Pagnell Road to Olney Act 1832 (2 & 3 Will. 4. c. xviii))
Hertford and Bedford Roads Act 1790 (repealed)	30 Geo. 3. c. 115	9 June 1790
An Act for continuing the Term, and enlarging the Powers of certain Acts, for repairing the Road from the Town of Hitchin, through Shefford, to the Turnpike Road from Saint Alban's to Bedford, and other Roads therein mentioned, in the Counties of Hertford and Bedford. (Repealed by Hitchin and Bedford Roads and Branches Act 1813 (53 Geo. 3. c. xciii) and Hitchin, Shefford, Henlow and Gorford Bridge Roads Act 1835 (5 & 6 Will. 4. c. xxxix))

=== Private and personal acts ===
Short title	Citation	Royal assent
Long title
Pointon Inclosure Act 1790	30 Geo. 3. c. 1 Pr.	25 February 1790
An Act for dividing and enclosing the Common Cow Pasture and Common Fen, in the Parish of Pointon, in the County of Lincoln.
Linton Inclosure Act 1790	30 Geo. 3. c. 2 Pr.	25 February 1790
An Act for dividing and enclosing several Open Fields, and a Stinted Pasture called Linton Pasture, within the Township of Linton, in the West Riding of the County of York.
Schusler's Naturalization Act 1790	30 Geo. 3. c. 3 Pr.	25 February 1790
An Act for naturalizing Gottlob Gotthelff Schusler.
Money's Estate Act 1790	30 Geo. 3. c. 4 Pr.	1 April 1790
An Act for vesting Part of the Freehold Estates devised by the Will of James Money Esquire deceased, in Trustees to be sold, and for laying out the Money arising thereby, in the Purchase of other Hereditaments, to be settled to the same Uses as the Estates to be sold now stand limited to.
Rybot's Divorce Act 1790	30 Geo. 3. c. 5 Pr.	1 April 1790
An Act to dissolve the Marriage of Francis Thomas Rybot with Alicia Fowler his now Wife, and to enable him to marry again; and for other Purposes therein mentioned.
Old Buckenham Inclosure Act 1790	30 Geo. 3. c. 6 Pr.	1 April 1790
An Act for dividing and enclosing the Commons, Fens, and Waste Lands, within the Parish of Old Buckenham, in the County of Norfolk.
Burton Leonard Inclosure Act 1790	30 Geo. 3. c. 7 Pr.	1 April 1790
An Act for dividing and enclosing several Open Fields in the Township of Burton Leonard, in the County of York.
Harewood Inclosure Act 1790	30 Geo. 3. c. 8 Pr.	1 April 1790
An Act for dividing and enclosing the several Moors, Commons, or Waste Grounds called Dunkeswick Common, Huby Common, Wescoe-hill Common, and Weeton Green, within the Manor and Parish of Harewood, in the County of York.
Dibden Inclosure Act 1790	30 Geo. 3. c. 9 Pr.	1 April 1790
An Act for dividing and allotting the intermixt or Commonable Lands and Grounds and Common Pastures or Waste Lands, within the Manor and Parish of Dibden, in the County of Southampton.
North Collingham Inclosure Act 1790	30 Geo. 3. c. 10 Pr.	1 April 1790
An Act for dividing, allotting, enclosing, and regulating the Open Fields, Meadows, Pastures, Moors, Commons, and Waste Grounds, in the Parish of North Collingham, in the County of Nottingham.
Killingworth Moor Inclosure Act 1790	30 Geo. 3. c. 11 Pr.	1 April 1790
An Act for dividing and enclosing a certain Common, Moor, or Tract of Waste Ground, called Killingworth Moor, in the Parish of Long Benton, in the County of Northumberland.
Watson's Name Act 1790	30 Geo. 3. c. 12 Pr.	1 April 1790
An Act to enable Thomas Samwell Watson Samwell Esquire, (lately called Thomas Samwell Watson), and his Heirs Male, to take the Surname and use the Arms of Samwell, pursuant to the Will of Sir Thomas Samwell Baronet, deceased.
Naturalization of George Paetsch, John Garbers, and John Pasteur.	30 Geo. 3. c. 13 Pr.	1 April 1790
An Act for naturalizing George Pætsch, John Christian Hartwig Garbers, and John Henry Pasteur.
Bierbaum's Naturalization Act 1790	30 Geo. 3. c. 14 Pr.	1 April 1790
An Act for naturalizing Julius George Bierbaum.
Turmine's Naturalization Act 1790	30 Geo. 3. c. 15 Pr.	1 April 1790
An Act for naturalizing Noah Turmine.
Koops' Naturalization Act 1790	30 Geo. 3. c. 16 Pr.	1 April 1790
An Act for naturalizing Matthias Koops.
Terrington St. Clement's and Terrington St. John's (Norfolk) Embanking and Inclosure Act 1790	30 Geo. 3. c. 17 Pr.	28 April 1790
An Act for embanking the Common Salt Marsh within the Parishes of Terrington Saint Clement's and Terrington Saint John's, in the County of Norfolk; and for dividing and enclosing the same and other Commons within the said Parishes.
Deverill Longbridge, Hussey Deverill and Monkton Deverill (Wiltshire): division and allotment of open and commonable lands.	30 Geo. 3. c. 18 Pr.	28 April 1790
An Act for dividing and allotting the Open and Commonable Lands within the Manor of Deverill Longbridge, Hussey Deverill, and Monkton Deverill, in the County of Wilts.
Dormston Inclosure Act 1790	30 Geo. 3. c. 19 Pr.	28 April 1790
An Act for dividing and enclosing the Open Common Fields and other Commonable Lands within the Parish of Dormstone, in the County of Worcester.
Harby Inclosure Act 1790	30 Geo. 3. c. 20 Pr.	28 April 1790
An Act for dividing and enclosing the Open Common Fields, Pastures, and other Commonable Lands and Waste Grounds, within the Parish of Harby, in the County of Leicester.
Blaauw's Naturalization Act 1790	30 Geo. 3. c. 21 Pr.	28 April 1790
An Act for naturalizing Willem Blaauw.
Mickleover Inclosure Act 1790	30 Geo. 3. c. 22 Pr.	7 May 1790
An Act for dividing and enclosing the Open Fields, Common Meadows and Pastures, Common and Waste Lands, in the Liberty or Lordship of Mickleover, in the County of Derby.
Rode Common Inclosure Act 1790	30 Geo. 3. c. 23 Pr.	7 May 1790
An Act for dividing and enclosing Part of a certain Common or Waste Land, called Road Common, within the Manor of Road and Langham, in the Parishes of Road and North Bradley, in the Counties of Somerset and Wilts.
Bleaton Inclosure Act 1790	30 Geo. 3. c. 24 Pr.	7 May 1790
An Act for dividing and enclosing the Common and Waste Grounds within the Manor of Bleatarn, in the Parish of Warcop, in the County of Westmorland.
Cotgrave Inclosure Act 1790	30 Geo. 3. c. 25 Pr.	7 May 1790
An Act to confirm and establish the Division, Allotments, and Enclosure of the Open Fields, Meadows, Pastures, Commons, and Waste Grounds, lying in the Parish of Cotgrave, in the County of Nottingham, and also several Exchanges of Lands within the said Parish.
Polebrook Inclosure Act 1790	30 Geo. 3. c. 26 Pr.	7 May 1790
An Act for dividing and enclosing the Common and Open Fields, Meadows, Commonable Lands and Waste Grounds, in the Parish of Polebrook, in the County of Northampton.
Duke of Newcastle's Estate Act 1790	30 Geo. 3. c. 27 Pr.	9 June 1790
An Act for empowering the Trustees of the Most Noble Henry Duke of Newcastle, to lay out Part of his settled Money in the Purchase of a Leasehold Manor, Messuages, Farms, Lands, Tythes, Tenements, and Hereditaments, lying intermixed, or convenient to be enjoyed, with his settled Estates, in the Counties of Nottingham and York, upon the like Trusts, and with the like Powers, as his said Estates now stand settled upon, or are subject or liable to.
Wilson's Estate Act 1790	30 Geo. 3. c. 28 Pr.	9 June 1790
An Act for Sale of Part of the settled Estates of Richard Wilson Esquire, deceased, in the County of York, and for settling other Estates in the County of the City of York, in lieu thereof.
White's Estate Act 1790	30 Geo. 3. c. 29 Pr.	9 June 1790
An Act for vesting the settled Estates of the Reverend Stephen White, Doctor of Laws, in London, Middlesex, Surrey, and Hertfordshire, in Trustees to be sold, and for laying out the Purchase Money in other Estates, to be settled to the same Uses, and for enabling the Trustees in the mean Time, to grant building and repairing Leases.
Sir John Riddell, Surname, and Archibald Buchanan's Estate Act 1790	30 Geo. 3. c. 30 Pr.	9 June 1790
An Act to enable Sir John Riddell Baronet, to use the Surname and Arms of Buchanan, pursuant to the Will of Archibald Buchanan Esquire, deceased; and for vesting certain Estates in the Counties of Bedford and Bucks devised by the said Will, to the Uses therein mentioned, in Trustees to sell the same, for discharging Incumbrances thereon; and to lay out the Residue of the Money arising by such Sale in the Purchase of Lands to be settled to the same Uses; and for other Purposes.
Templer's Estate Act 1790	30 Geo. 3. c. 31 Pr.	9 June 1790
An Act for exchanging the settled Estate of the Reverend John Templer, in the County of Kent, for another Estate of greater Value, in the County of Devon, to be settled in lieu thereof.
Lawrie's Estate Act 1790	30 Geo. 3. c. 32 Pr.	9 June 1790
An Act for settling and securing the Lands of Quintinespie, Kirklands, and others, and the Tiends, Parsonage, and Vicarage of the Lands of Redcastle and others lying in the Stewartry of Kirkcudbright, to and in Favour of Mistress Margaret Laurie of Redcastle, Widow of the deceased Andrew Laurie Esquire, of Redcastle, and the same Series of Heirs in Fee Tail, and under the same Conditions and Limitations as are mentioned and contained in Two Deeds of Entail, made in the Years One thousand seven hundred and twenty-seven, and One thousand seven hundred and thirty-three, by Mr. Walter Laurie of Redcastle, and for vesting in the aforesaid Mistress Margaret Laurie and her Heirs and Assigns, in Fee-Simple, the Lands of Mool and Cairn, and others, in the County of Wigton.
Estcourt's Estate Act 1790	30 Geo. 3. c. 33 Pr.	9 June 1790
An Act for vesting certain Parts of the settled Estates of Thomas Estcourt Esquire, in the Counties of Gloucester and Wilts, in Trustees to be sold and exchanged; and for laying out Part of the Money arising by Sale in other Estates, to be settled to the same Uses; and for applying the Residue in Discharge of Incumbrances.
William Colbourn and Eton College: exchange of advowsons of united rectories of Creeting All Saints and Creeting Saint Olaves (Suffolk) for advowson of rectory of East Wretham (Norfolk).	30 Geo. 3. c. 34 Pr.	9 June 1790
An Act to effectuate and establish an Exchange between William Colhoun Esquire with the Provost and College of Eton, of the Advowson and Right of Patronage of and to the consolidated or united Rectories of Creeting All Saints and Creeting Saint Olaves, in the County of Suffolk, for the Advowson and Right of Patronage of and to the Rectory of East Wretham, in the County of Norfolk.
William Colbourne and King's College, Cambridge: exchange of advowson of rectory of Hepworth (Suffolk), and land in Hepworth, for advowson of rectory of West Wretham (Norfolk).	30 Geo. 3. c. 35 Pr.	9 June 1790
An Act to effectuate and establish an Exchange between William Colhoun Esquire, and the Provost and Scholars of the King's College of Blessed Mary and Saint Nicholas, of Cambridge, of the Advowson and Right of Patronage of and to the Rectory of Hepworth, in the County of Suffolk, and certain Pieces of Land and Hereditaments in Hepworth aforesaid, for the Advowson and Right of Patronage of, and to the Rectory of West Wretham, in the County of Norfolk.
Duke of Norfolk's Estate Act 1790	30 Geo. 3. c. 36 Pr.	9 June 1790
An Act for vesting Part of the settled Estates of the Most Noble Charles Duke of Norfolk, in the County of Sussex, in him the said Duke, in Fee, and for settling other Estates of the said Duke in the same County, of equal or greater Value, in lieu thereof.
Duke of Bolton's Estate Act 1790	30 Geo. 3. c. 37 Pr.	9 June 1790
An Act for vesting the Manor of Fisherton Delamere, otherwise Fisherton Delamore, and other Hereditaments, in the County of Wilts, devised by the Will of the Most Noble Charles, formerly Duke of Bolton, with the Appurtenances, in Trustees, discharged of the Uses and Trusts of the said Will, for the Purpose of more effectually carrying into Execution certain Decrees or Decretal Orders of the Court of Chancery, for the Sale of the said Estates.
Earl of Abergavenny's Estate Act 1790	30 Geo. 3. c. 38 Pr.	9 June 1790
An Act to confirm a Lease lately made by Henry Nevill Earl of Abergavenny, of certain entailed Mines and other Hereditaments, in the County of Monmouth, and to enable granting future Leases of the said entailed Mines and other Hereditaments, and also of all other Estates, of which the said Earl is seized as Tenant in Tail Male, under an Act of Parliament passed in the Second and Third Years of the Reign of King Philip and Queen Mary, and under the Limitations in the last Will of George Lord Abergavenny, in the said Act of Philip and Mary mentioned.
Hatchett's Estate Act 1790	30 Geo. 3. c. 39 Pr.	9 June 1790
An Act for vesting the settled Estates of Richard Hatchett Esquire, and Katherine his Wife, in the County of Chester, and Part of their settled Estates in the County of Salop, in Trustees to be sold, and for laying out the Purchase Money in other Estates, to be settled to the same Uses.
Bowbrickhill and Fenny Stratford Inclosure Act 1790	30 Geo. 3. c. 40 Pr.	9 June 1790
An Act for dividing and enclosing the Open and Common Fields, Meadows, Heath, and Waste Grounds, within the Parish of Bowbrickhill, and Hamlet of Fenny Stratford, in the County of Buckingham.
Lutterworth Inclosure Act 1790	30 Geo. 3. c. 41 Pr.	9 June 1790
An Act for dividing and enclosing the Open Fields and Commonable Places, in the Parish of Lutterworth, in the County of Leicester.
Clayworth Inclosure Act 1790	30 Geo. 3. c. 42 Pr.	9 June 1790
An Act for dividing, allotting, enclosing, and regulating certain Open Fields, Meadows, Pastures, Carrs, Commons, and Waste Grounds, within the Township and Liberty of Clayworth, in the Parish of Clayworth, in the County of Nottingham.
Whychurch, Milborne and Little Somerford (Wiltshire) inclosure and drainage.	30 Geo. 3. c. 43 Pr.	9 June 1790
An Act for draining, dividing, allotting, and enclosing, certain Commons and Waste Lands, and also a certain Open Common Meadow, within the Manors of Whychurch and Milborne, and Little Somerford, in the County of Wilts.
Tickton Carr Inclosure Act 1790	30 Geo. 3. c. 44 Pr.	9 June 1790
An Act for dividing and enclosing Tickton Carr or Common, in the County of York.
Great and Little Bedwin and Preshute (Wiltshire) division and allotment of open and common lands.	30 Geo. 3. c. 45 Pr.	9 June 1790
An Act for dividing and allotting several Open and Common Lands and Grounds, within the Parishes of Great Bedwin, Little Bedwin, and Preshute, in the County of Wilts.
Hutton Bushell Inclosure Act 1790	30 Geo. 3. c. 46 Pr.	9 June 1790
An Act for dividing and enclosing the Open Fields, Ings, Commons, and Waste Grounds, within the Manor and Township of Hutton Bushell, in the North Riding of the County of York.
De Luc's Naturalization Act 1790	30 Geo. 3. c. 47 Pr.	9 June 1790
An Act for naturalizing Francoise Antoinette De Luc.
Schonberg's Naturalization Act 1790	30 Geo. 3. c. 48 Pr.	9 June 1790
An Act for naturalizing August Leberecht Schonberg. (Note: August Leberecht Schonberg.)
Sir Peter Burrell's and Reverend Edward Brackenbury's Estates Act 1790	30 Geo. 3. c. 49 Pr.	10 June 1790
An Act for the Partition of divers Messuages, Lands, and Hereditaments, in Skendleby and other Parishes, in the County of Lincoln, in which Sir Peter Burrell Baronet, in Right of the Right Honourable Priscilla Barbara Elizabeth Baroness Willoughby of Eresby his Wife, and the Reverend Edward Brackenbury, have now undivided Moieties or Half Parts.

=== Sources ===
- Pickering, Danby, ed. (1790). "Anno regni tricesimo Georgii III". The Statutes at Large. Vol. 37. pp. 1–144 – via Google Books.
- Journals of the House of Commons. Vol. 45. London: His Majesty's Stationery Office. 1803. pp. 3–549 – via Google Books.
- Journal of the House of Lords. Vol. 38: 1787-1790. pp. 528–685 – via British History Online.
- Chronological Table of and Index to the Statutes. Vol. 1: To the End of the Session 59 Vict. Sess. 2 (1895) (13th ed.). London: Her Majesty's Stationery Office. 1896. pp. 149–150 – via Google Books.
- "Acts of the Parliament of Great Britain from 1790". legislation.gov.uk. The National Archives.

== See also ==
- List of acts of the Parliament of Great Britain
