= Mill Stream Nature Reserve =

Nature reserve in Suffolk, England

Coordinates: 52.053°N 1.222°E

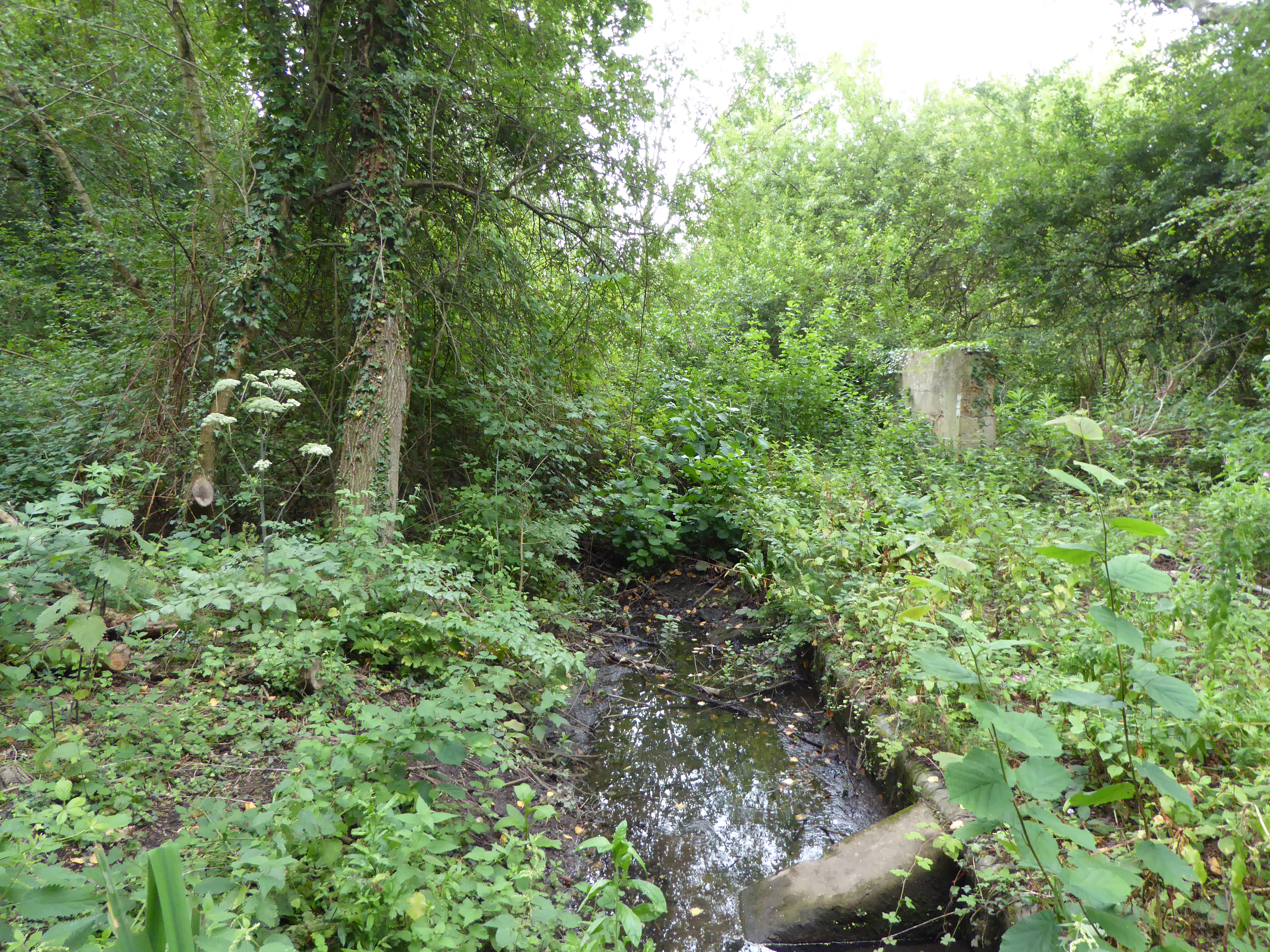
- Interactive map of Mill Stream Nature Reserve
- Type: Local Nature Reserve
- Location: Rushmere St Andrew, Suffolk
- OS grid: TM 210 443
- Area: 4.7 hectares (12 acres)
- Manager: East Suffolk, Rushmere St Andrew Parish Council and the Greenways Countryside Project

Mill Stream Nature Reserve is a 4.7 hectare Local Nature Reserve in Rushmere St Andrew on the eastern outskirts of Ipswich in Suffolk. It is owned by East Suffolk District Council and managed by the council together with Rushmere St Andrew Parish Council and the Greenways Countryside Project.

This linear site along the banks of a stream also has ponds, wet carr, woodland, wildflower grassland and willow scrub. There are ancient oak trees, and fauna include water voles.

There is access from several roads including Kentwell Close and Euston Avenue.
