= Bobbits Lane =

Nature reserve in Ipswich, England

Coordinates: 52.03°N 1.128°E

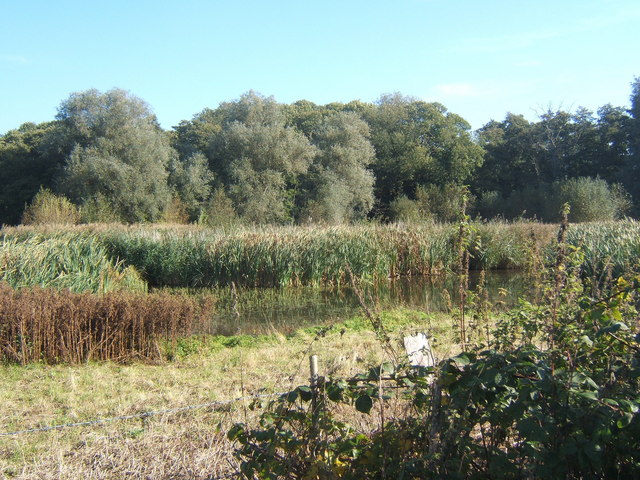
- Interactive map of Bobbits Lane
- Type: Local Nature Reserve
- Location: Ipswich, Suffolk
- OS grid: TM 147415
- Area: 16.1 hectares (40 acres)
- Manager: Greenways Countryside Project

Bobbits Lane is a 16.1 hectares (40 acres) Local Nature Reserve in Ipswich in Suffolk. It is owned by Ipswich Borough Council and managed by the Greenways Countryside Project.

In the reserve, grassy paths run through wet meadows. Fauna include otters, water voles, kingfishers, egrets and toads.

There is access to the site from Stoke Park Drive.
