= Alderman Canal West =

Part of the Local Nature Reserve in Suffolk

Coordinates: 52.055°N 1.14°E

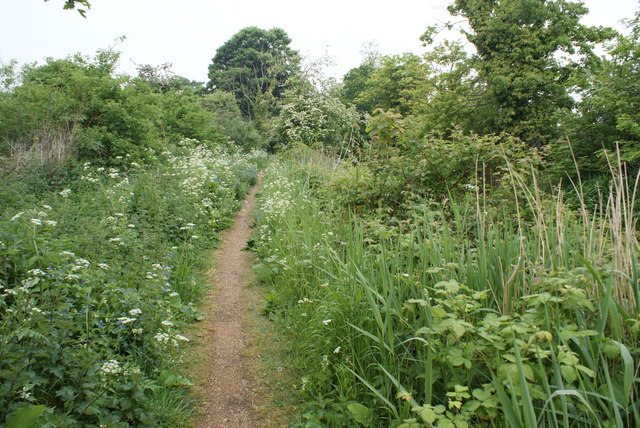
- Interactive map of Alderman Canal West
- Type: Local Nature Reserve
- Location: Ipswich, Suffolk
- OS grid: TM 154 443
- Area: 1.0 hectare (2.5 acres)
- Manager: Greenways Countryside Project; Ipswich Borough Council

Alderman Canal West is a one hectare Local Nature Reserve in Ipswich in Suffolk. It is owned by Ipswich Borough Council and managed by the Greenways Countryside Project.

Paths run along the canal and through reedbeds. There is also grassland with tall herbs, and the canal bank has rare wetland flora. Birds include common kingfishers and reed buntings.

There is access from Sir Alf Ramsey Way.

== See also ==
- Alderman Canal East
