= Pembroke Town and Castle =

Painting by Richard Wilson

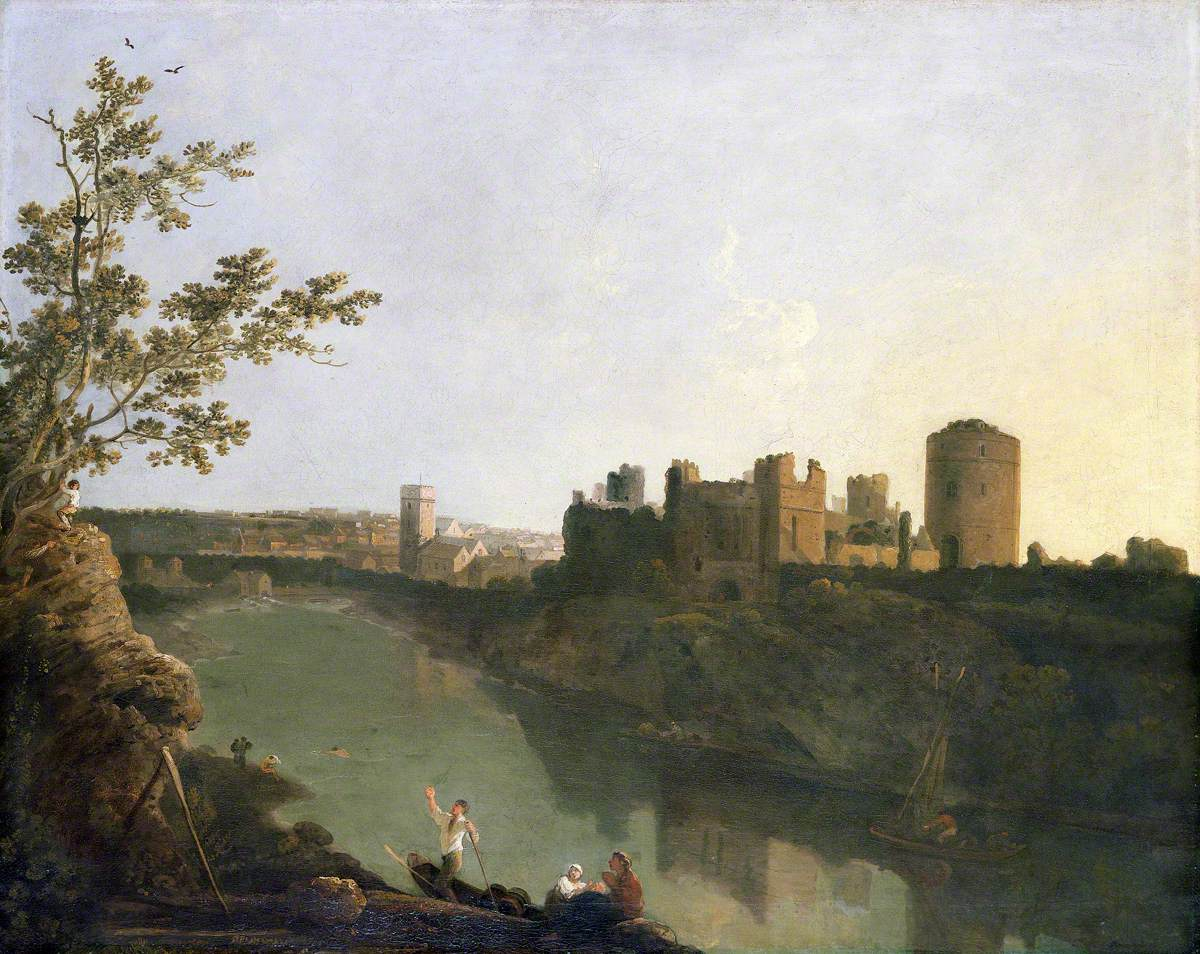
- Artist: Richard Wilson
- Year: c.1765
- Type: Oil on canvas, landscape painting
- Dimensions: 102.7 cm × 128.2 cm (40.4 in × 50.5 in)
- Location: National Museum of Wales, Cardiff

Pembroke Town and Castle is a c.1765 landscape painting by the British artist Richard Wilson. It depicts a view of the town of Pembroke and Pembroke Castle in South Wales. It seen across the Pembroke River which connects the town to the large anchorage at Milford Haven. The tower of St Mary's Church dominates the view of the town. Compositionally it was inspired by Dutch paintings of the seventeenth century which became popular with British artists for depicting river scenes.

The work was likely to have been commissioned by the landowner and politician William Vaughan. Although the work was never exhibited in Wilson's lifetime, an engraving based on it by James Mason did appeared at the Free Society of Artists in 1767. Today the painting is in the collection of the National Museum of Wales in Cardiff, which acquired it in 1930.

== Bibliography ==
- Evans, Mark & Fairclough, Oliver. The National Museum of Wales :A Companion Guide to the National Art Gallery. National Museum of Wales, 1993.
- Solkin, David H. Richard Wilson: The Landscape of Reaction. Tate Gallery, 1982.
