= Bentlass =

Village in Pembrokeshire, Wales

Coordinates: 51.675°N 4.950°W

- Location within Pembrokeshire
- OS grid reference: SM9601
- Community: Hundleton
- Principal area: Pembrokeshire
- Country: Wales
- Sovereign state: United Kingdom
- Police: Dyfed-Powys
- Fire: Mid and West Wales
- Ambulance: Welsh

Bentlass is a small rural riverside settlement in the community of Hundleton and parish of Monkton in south Pembrokeshire, Wales. There was for many years a ferry crossing between Bentlass and Pennar, a suburb of Pembroke Dock, and the place became national news in 1889 when a ferry accident occurred in which nine people died.

== Description ==
Bentlass is on the south bank of Pembroke River to the west of Monkton and the north of Hundleton, 1 mile (1.6 km) from where the river flows into Milford Haven Waterway. Salt marsh is revealed when the tide is out.

== History ==
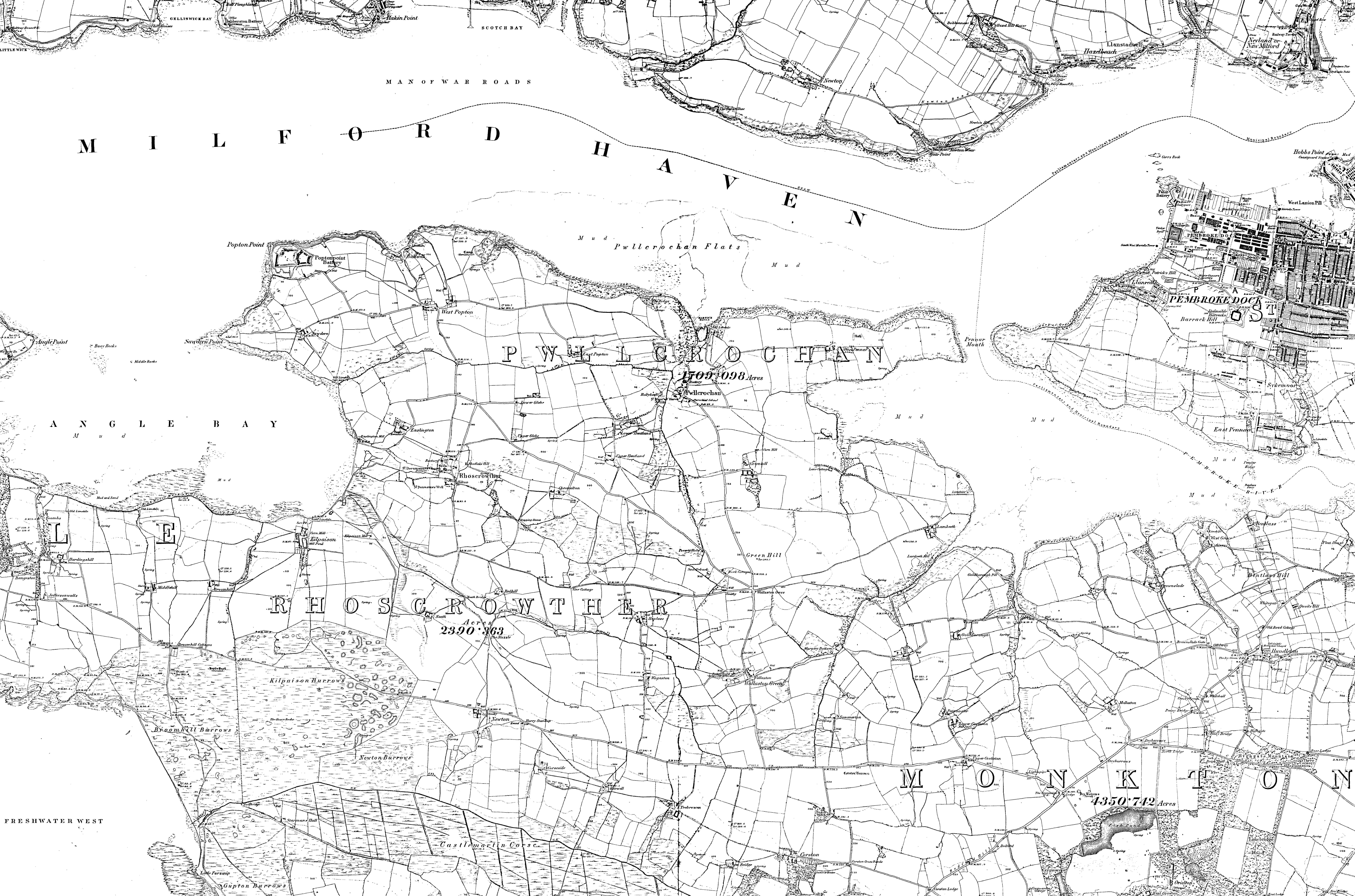
Late 19th-century map showing Bentlass Ferry in Pembroke River (extreme right)

In the early 19th century, according to Lewis, the entire population of Monkton parish, other than those living in the village, was engaged in agriculture. Bentlass, though, is not mentioned by name, nor is there any record of a place of worship at Bentlass. A Grade II listed 19th century warehouse is in the settlement. Bentlass was mentioned in the London Gazette in 1845, under Admiralty Regulations concerning river traffic in the Milford Haven Waterway, ruling that:

...no gunpowder exceeding five pounds weight in the whole be landed between the town of Milford and Lawrenny-ferry, or below Bentlass in Pennar-pill, or any part of the south side of the haven...

=== Ferry ===
From about 1859, John Jones had operated a ferry from Bentlass to Pennar on the north bank. A ferry is marked on a pre-1850 parish map. In February 1889, the ferry capsized in bad weather, resulting in the drowning of all on board, including Jones, his assistant, and their seven women passengers. The tragedy was widely reported, and a number of eye-witnesses gave evidence to the coroner, with some variations in the details. The ferry service continued to operate until the 1930s.
