= Castell y Bere =

Castle in Gwynedd, Wales

- Llanfihangel-y-pennant, Wales
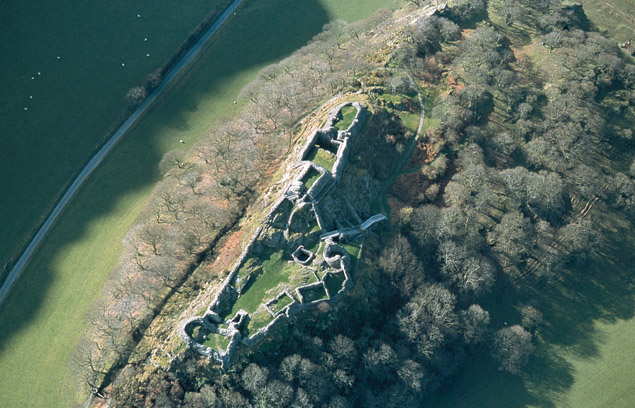
- Castell y Bere

Site information
- Type: Linear castle
- Owner: Cadw
- Condition: Ruined

Location
- Shown within Wales
- Coordinates: 52.65818°N 3.9715°W

Site history
- Built: Began 1221
- Built by: Llywelyn the Great
- In use: Open to public
- Materials: Siltstone
- Events: Welsh Wars; Prince Madoc's Rebellion

Castell y Bere is a Welsh castle near Llanfihangel-y-pennant in Gwynedd, Wales. Constructed by Llywelyn the Great in the 1220s, the stone castle was intended to maintain his authority over the local people and to defend the south-west part of the princedom of Gwynedd. In 1282, war with Edward I of England resulted in the death of Llywelyn's grandson, Llywelyn ap Gruffudd, and Castell y Bere fell to English forces. Edward I expanded the castle further and established a small town beside it. In 1294 the Welsh leader Madog ap Llywelyn mounted a major revolt and the castle was besieged and apparently burnt. Edward did not repair it and it became ruined. Today it is in the hands of Cadw and operated as a tourist attraction.

== History ==
=== 1220–40 ===
Castell y Bere was built in the 1220s by Llywelyn the Great on a rocky hillock overlooking the Dysynni Valley, near Llanfihangel-y-pennant. Traditionally the Welsh princes had not constructed castles, instead using undefended palaces called llysoedd, or courts. From the late 11th century onwards, the Normans had advanced into Wales, taking lands in the north and establishing a band of occupied territory in the south called the Welsh Marches. During the 12th century some timber and earthwork castles began to be built, but in small numbers.

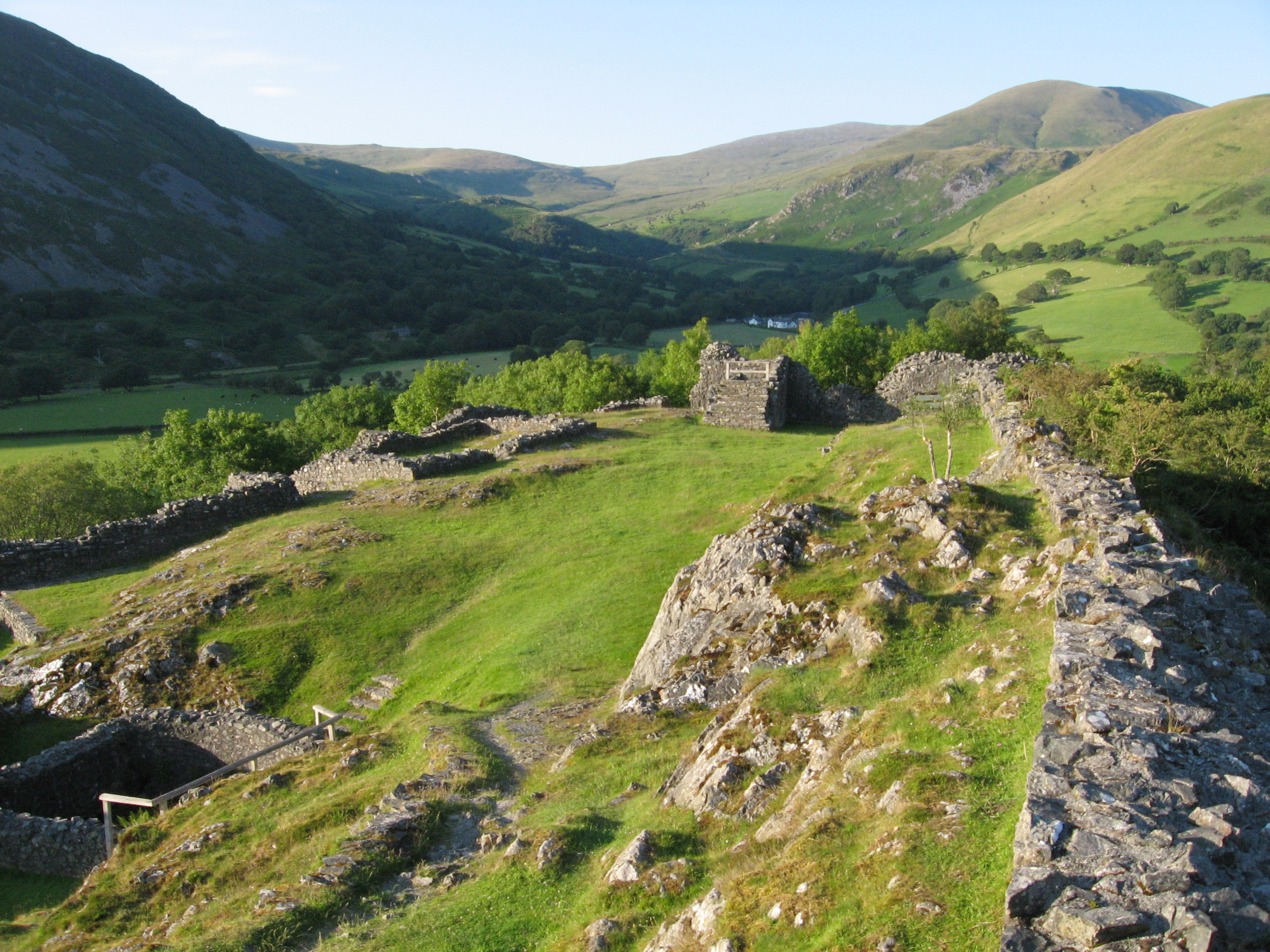
Aerial view of the castle

Llywelyn the Great initially controlled the princedom of Gwynedd, but grew more powerful over the course of his reign, extending his influence over much of Wales during the early years of the 13th century. Llywelyn was faced by several challenges, including dealing with the threat from the kings of England, and maintaining his authority over the native Welsh.

In 1221 Llywelyn took control of neighbouring Meirionnydd from his son, Gruffydd; Llywelyn had previously placed Gruffydd in power there, but the father and son had fallen out. The prince then began to build the castle of Castell y Bere with the intent of controlling the local population and securing his new south-west border, which included the mountain trade routes between Gwynedd, Powys Wenwynwyn and Deheubarth. Castell y Bere was the first of several stone castles built by Llywelyn and the initial castle consisted of several towers positioned around a courtyard, situated on a rocky hillock in the Dysynni Valley near Cadair Idris.

=== 1240–1300 ===
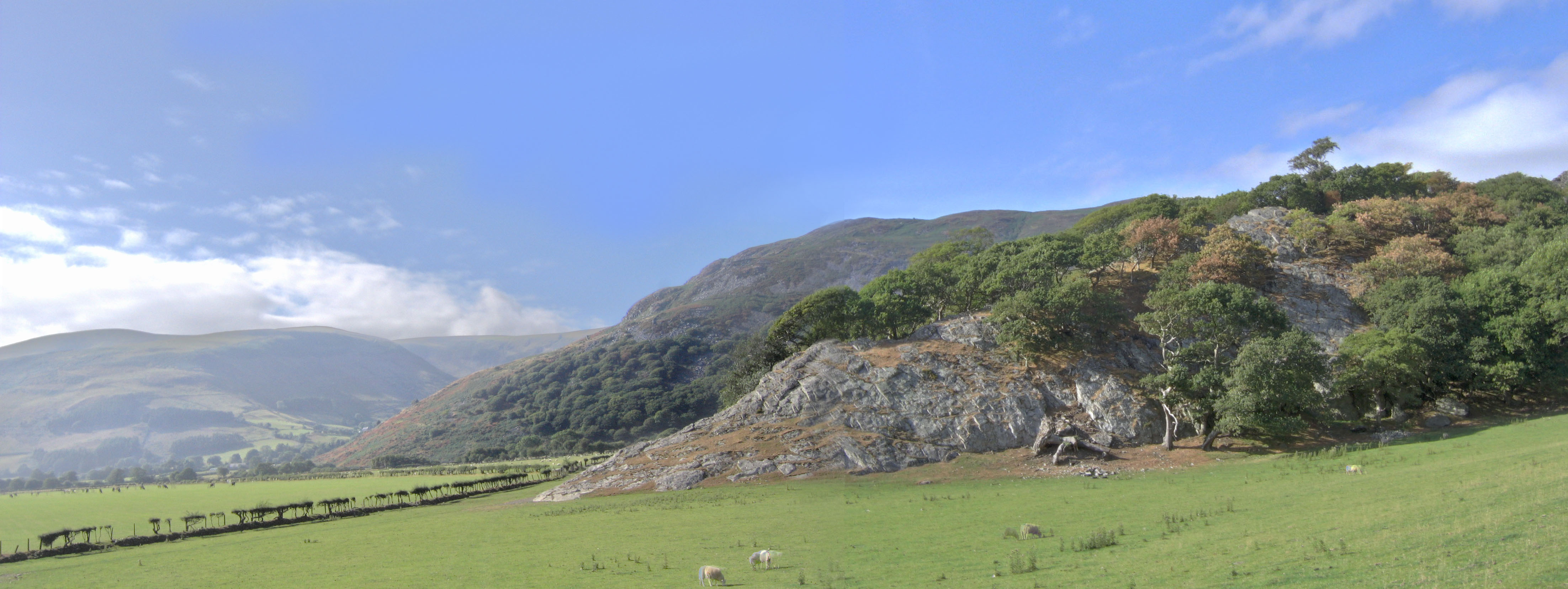
Castell y Bere, rock

Following Llywelyn's death in 1240, Gwynedd's power declined and many of its eastern lands were taken by Henry III of England in 1247. Llywelyn's grandson, Llywelyn ap Gruffudd, took power in 1255 and imprisoned his brother Owain ap Gruffudd before extending his power across Wales. Llywelyn extended the castle with an additional tower to the south, similar to that built at Dolforwyn, probably in order to provide additional accommodation. (Note: Earlier dating of the south tower has been less certain; Richard Avent, for example, previously considered that Llywelyn the Great, rather than his grandson, might have built this tower.)

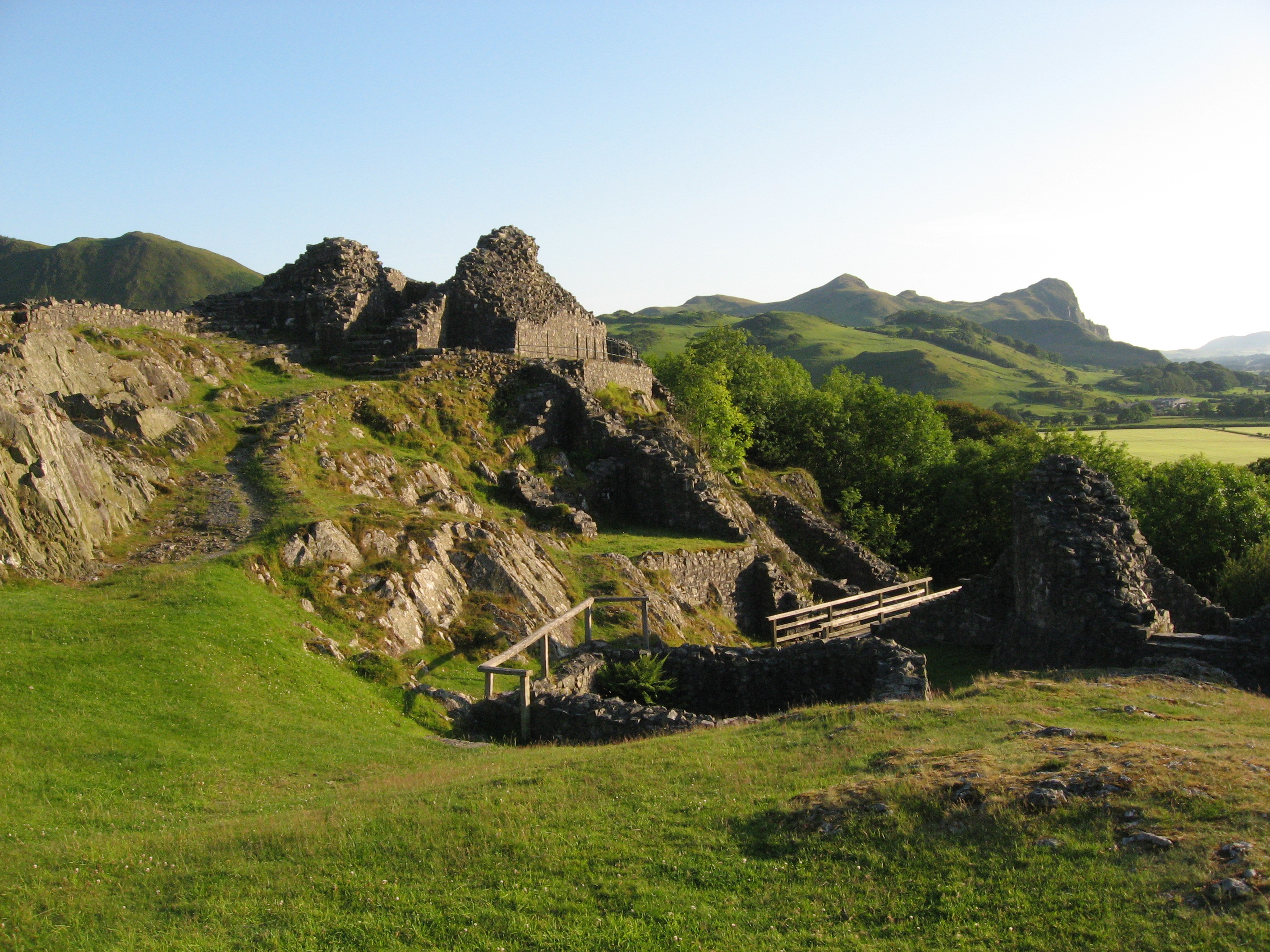
Looking south-west across the castle

The conflict between the Welsh princes and the English kings continued in the reign of Edward I. In 1282 Llywelyn fought a final campaign against Edward, ending in the prince's death near Builth that December. His brother, Dafydd ap Gruffydd, assumed power but during 1283 was forced south into Snowdonia. Meanwhile, forces under the command of Roger Lestrange and William de Valence marched from south Wales and Shropshire, placing Castell y Bere under siege and taking it on 25 April. Edward deployed 7,000 troops to detain Dafydd who was finally captured and executed in October. A team of five masons and five carpenters, under the command of Master Bertram the Engineer, were left at Castell y Bere "to carry out various works" after the English army had left. The precise nature of these works are unknown, but historian A. J. Taylor interprets them as being repairs to the castle following the siege.

Edward continued to invest money and time in Castell y Bere; he visited three times in 1284, establishing a small town alongside the castle, possibly just to the east. Reflecting the anti-Semitic attitudes of Edward, the 1284 town charter stated that "Jews shall not sojourn in the borough at any time". Walter of Huntercombe was appointed the constable of the castle by Edward in 1284 and spent £47 building a new chamber there, potentially for the king to use during visits. (Note: It is impossible to accurately compare 13th century and modern prices or incomes. For comparison, the average annual income of a baron of the period was approximately £668.) Another £262 was spent between 1286 and 1290, most of this in the year following the revolt of Rhys ap Maredudd. A pair of linking walls to the south tower was probably built around this time, and the external barbican and gate towers may also have been built at this time.

In 1294, however, the Welsh leader Madoc ap Llywelyn mounted a major revolt across Wales. Richard Fitzalan, the Earl of Arundel, was ordered in mid-October to ensure that the castle was secure, but by late October the castle was under siege from Madoc's forces. Robert FitzWalter, the castle's constable, was sent to lead a relief expedition. The final fate of Castell y Bere is uncertain, but it was probably taken by Welsh forces in late 1294 and subsequently burnt.

=== 14th–21st century ===
Following the revolt Castell y Bere and the new English town were both abandoned. While the castle was well situated, unlike the other new coastal castles built by Edward I it could not be provisioned by sea and as a result did not fit well into his plan for controlling North Wales. By the 16th century the castle had lapsed into a state of decay, and the Welsh poet Gruffydd Hiraethog observed that "on the banks of the river Dysynni is Castell-y-Bere, where stood a large strong building but which is now destroyed and cast to the ground".

After many years, the site was finally cleared of undergrowth in the 1850s, revealing more of the castle's remains, and William Wynne, the owner of the site, carried out the first archaeological investigations. In 1949 Charles Corbett, the last private owner of the ruins, placed them into the guardianship of the state. In the 21st century the site is in the care of Cadw and is protected as a scheduled monument and maintained as a tourist attraction. In the light of Welsh devolution and other political changes, the history of Castell y Bere and similar Welsh castles has become increasingly prominent. In response, Cadw have noted that they intend to give an increased priority to communicating the history of these castles and the Welsh princes.

== Architecture ==
Plan of the castle: A – south tower; B – ditch yard; C – middle tower; D – barbican; E – round tower; F – courtyard; G – north tower

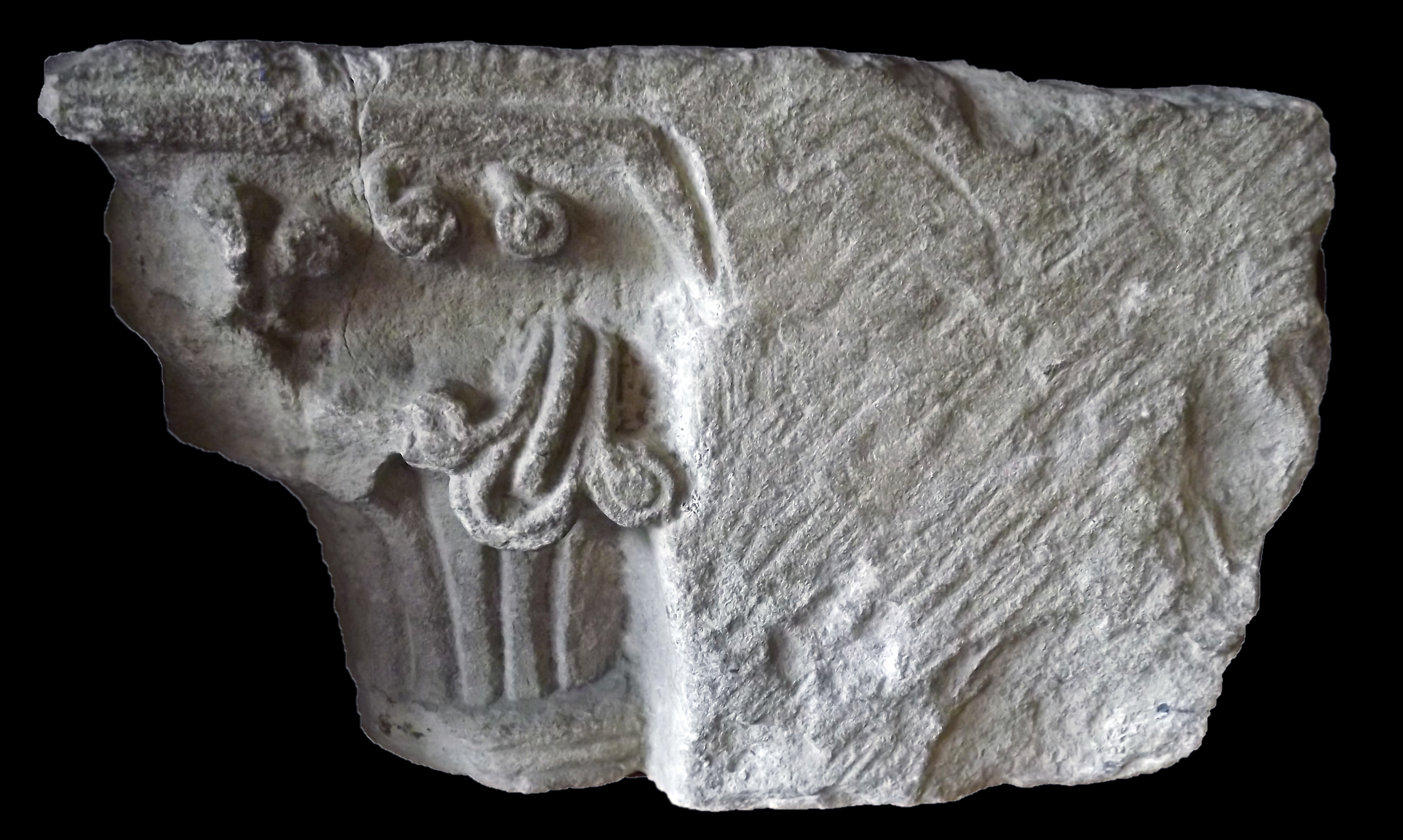
Carved stonework from the castle, now on display at Criccieth Castle

Today the ruins of Castell y Bere still stand on a rocky outcrop, with protective ditches cut into the stone on the south and east sides. The entrance to the castle lies on the west side, where the barbican, probably built by Edward I, contains two gate towers, overlooking the stone steps approaching the inner gate. Through the barbican is the castle courtyard, containing a large well and the remains of several internal buildings of uncertain date.

The north tower is an apsidal, or "D-shaped", design that is characteristic of Welsh castles of the early 13th century. Originally it may have contained either a hall or a chapel. What is today the middle tower was originally the southernmost part of the defences, but now leads through the Edwardian ditch yard to the south tower, another apsidal design that once contained spacious accommodation. Both the apsidal towers lacked fireplaces in the main chambers, instead using central heaths to heat the rooms.

Unusually for an early Welsh castle, there is evidence of decorative sculpture, including statues of soldiers, having been built into the castle, along with decorative floor tiles. Castell y Bere is the only castle, other than Criccieth, to display such features. Historian Lawrence Butler considers that the castle has delivered some of "some of the finest stone carving from thirteenth-century Wales".

== Cultural references ==
- "Castell y Bere" is the first track on the album Rhown Garreg ar Garreg (1981) by the Welsh folk group Plethyn. Its lyrics are by Myrddin ap Dafydd and its tune is that of Sí Bheag, Sí Mhór by Turlough O'Carolan.
- Castell y Bere plays a key role in Sharon Kay Penman's Welsh Princes trilogy, particularly in The Reckoning (1991).
- Castell y Bere was visited by legendary rock singers Brian Johnson of AC/DC and Robert Plant of Led Zeppelin. This was for Johnson's Life on the Road series. The Castle is not far from Bron-Yr-Aur.

== See also ==
- Castles in Great Britain and Ireland
- List of castles in Wales

== Bibliography ==
- Avent, Richard. (2010) Dolwyddelan Castle, Dolbadarn Castle, Castell y Bere. Cardiff: Cadw. ISBN 978-1-85760-205-0.
- Butler, Lawrence and Dunning, G. C. (1974) "Medieval finds from Castell-y-Bere, Merioneth," Archaeologia Cambrensis Vol. 1974 pp. 78–112.
- Butler, Lawrence. (2010) "The Castles of the Princes of Gwynedd," in Williams and Kenyon (eds) (2010).
- Davis, Paul R. (2007) Castles of the Welsh Princes. Talybont, UK: Y Lolfa Cyf. ISBN 978-0-86243-970-5.
- Jones, Alan Ffred. (2010) "King Edward' I's Castles in North Wales – Now and Tomorrow," in Williams and Kenyon (eds) (2010).
- Hillaby, Joe; Hillaby, Caroline (2013). The Palgrave Dictionary of Medieval Anglo-Jewish History. Basingstok: Palgrave Macmillan. ISBN 978-0230278165.
- King, D. J. Cathcart. (1991) The Castle in England and Wales: An Interpretative History. London: Routledge. ISBN 0-415-00350-4.
- Taylor, Arnold Joseph. (1986) The Welsh Castles of Edward I. London: Hambledon Press. ISBN 978-0-907628-71-2.
- Williams, Diane M. and John R. Kenyon. (eds) (2010) The Impact of the Edwardian Castles in Wales. Oxford: Oxbow Books. ISBN 978-1-84217-380-0.
- Wynne, W. W. E. (1861) "Castell y Bere, Merionethshire," Archaeologia Cambrensis Vol. 16 pp. 105–110.
