= Manorbier Newton =

Village in Pembrokeshire, Wales

Coordinates: 51.665°N 4.827°W

Manorbier Newton: Welsh: Maenorbŷr-newydd
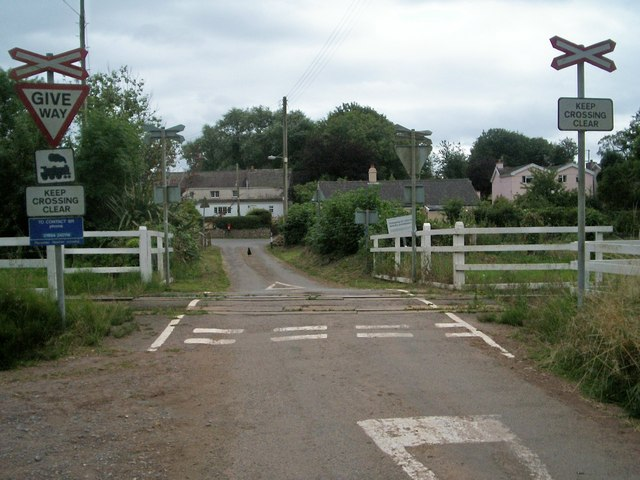
- Viewed south over the level crossing (2006)

- Location within Pembrokeshire
- Population: 50 (estimate for 2001)
- Community: Manorbier
- Principal area: Pembrokeshire
- Preserved county: Dyfed
- Country: Wales
- Sovereign state: United Kingdom
- Post town: TENBY
- Postcode district: SA70
- Police: Dyfed-Powys
- Fire: Mid and West Wales
- Ambulance: Welsh
- UK Parliament: Mid and South Pembrokeshire
- Senedd Cymru – Welsh Parliament: Carmarthen West and South Pembrokeshire

Manorbier Newton is a small village in the Pembrokeshire Coast National Park within the parish and community of Manorbier. The Pembroke River rises at nearby Hogeston Hill to flow past Lamphey and Pembroke Castle.

== Field system and ancient history ==
Manorbier Newton has a coaxial field system with the fields mainly running in north–south strips and separated by hedges, mounds and walls in varying states of repair. There is some disagreement about the age of the field system. Some other field systems of this type in Pembrokeshire are pre-Norman but the Manorbier Newton system is likely to date from the Bronze Age with some changes occurring in the Middle Ages with the founding of the Manorbier Newton and Jameston settlements. The division into strips may have been to divide up equally areas with different bedrocks (limestone, sandstone, millstone grit).

There are several mounds in fields near to The Ridgeway road which contain tumuli. One close to Glom Farm was excavated in 1851 then a 3-4 ton rock was broken through with explosives. There was a skeleton beneath. The Rev. G.N. Smith "felt convinced that a buried cromlech had been wantonly destroyed". The mound has not been subsequently excavated.

A Roman trumpet brooch in bronze / silver, probably used on a cloak, was found close to Manorbier Newton. A small number of other Roman remains have been found in Manorbier.

== History ==
The first recorded mention of Manorbier Newton (at that point written Neweton or Newtown) is from 1331 when it was the third largest vill of Manorbier manor. It was founded as a linear settlement when more land was needed than was available around Manorbier itself. Surviving records give an earlier date for the founding of Jameston but as the land around Manorbier Newton is of higher quality, Jameston may not have been the obvious first choice for development.

The Lord of the manor of Manorbier demesne lived elsewhere after the de Barri family sold their estate before 1392. Various parts of the land were gradually parcelled off so that by the time of three detailed surveys of 1601-1618 only one strip of land in Manorbier Newton, the 'Lords Mead', was still owned by the demesne. The process of enclosure of the fields appears to have started in this period. The will of John Bishop of Manorbier Newton, who died in 1617, shows he farmed 30 acres (12 ha) with wheat, peas, cattle, sheep, pigs, horses, geese and hens for a rent of £1/3/2 per year. In this era the land changed hands frequently.

In the 1800s, farms tended to be 20–30 acres (8–12 ha) although some were smaller. The 1863 opening of the railway, with a stop at Beaver's Hill as well as Manorbier station, led to a rapid increase in the use of fertiliser and farm machinery and by 1871 many of the smaller farms had been swallowed up by the larger.

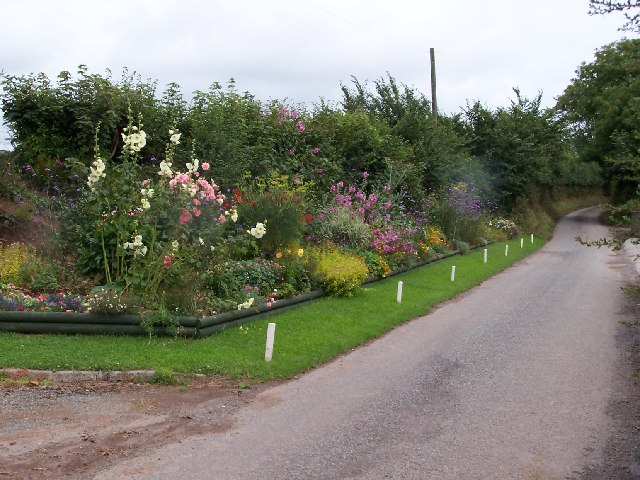
Manorbier Newton roadside border in 2004

Manorbier Newton had 16 holdings in 1485 and 14 in the early 1600s: 6 farms, 7 houses and 1 cottage In addition: 8 barns, 9 corn hay barns and 6 cowhouses. By 1841 there were 13 dwellings and 68 inhabitants. Trades included cordwainers, a mantlemaker and a druggist. By 1871 there were dressmakers, a butcher and the keeper of the railway crossing. By 1901 there were no tradespeople remaining in Manorbier Newton. Today Manorbier Newton has not grown significantly and is still approximately the same size as it was around 1600.

Manorbier Newton gained a congregationalist church in 1802, Newton Congregational Chapel was constructed in 1822. In 1851 at its most popular the chapel had 120 worshipers. The chapel later formed a Sunday School but by 1965 the chapel had closed and it was sold to become a holiday home.

The Ridgeway was the only road in the whole area for many centuries and gave access for drovers from Pembroke to Tenby. The part close to Manorbier Newton was historically moorland - it was only cleared for farming in WWII. The Ridgeway had an isolated beerhouse in this area, possibly called the Traveller's Rest, which later became Jenny Kibble's pub although the pub no longer exists.

== Bibliography ==
- Codd, Gerald (2012). Manorbier Parish: A History. Heliotrope Publishing. ISBN 978-0952343141.
