= Tembek =

History
- Name: Tembek
- Owner: Overseas LNG S1 Corporation
- Operator: Nakilat Shipping (Qatar) Limited (NSQL)
- Port of registry: Marshall Islands
- Builder: Samsung Heavy Industries Co. Ltd. (Korea), Koje Shipyard
- Yard number: 1605
- Laid down: 2006-05-15
- Launched: 2006-09-10
- Completed: 2007-11-19
- Identification: IMO number: 9337731; MMSI number: 538002921; Callsign: V7MX8

General characteristics
- Type: LNG tanker
- Tonnage: 136,410 GT; 40,924 NT; 106,896 DWT
- Length: overall 315.17 m (1,034 ft 0 in)
- Draught: 12 m (39 ft 4 in)
- Depth: 27 m (88 ft 7 in)
- Speed: 20.4 kn (37.8 km/h; 23.5 mph)
- Capacity: 216,200 m^{3} (7,640,000 cu ft) storage (LNG)

Tembek a Q-Flex ship is the first liquefied natural gas (LNG) carrier to berth at Milford Haven at the South Hook LNG terminal.

== Technical dates ==
The auxiliary boilers EB150120 and MB0106DS08 were designed and manufactured by Kangrim. The emergency diesel generator power unit (KTA38-D(M)) was produced by Cummins Inc.

The five main generator engines (7L32/40) were of MAN Diesel SE manufacture.

The two main propulsion engines are diesel (6S70ME-C) and were supplied by MAN B&W.

The two propellers are mono-block and were supplied by MMG (Mecklenburger Metallguss).

Speed recorded (Max / Average) 20.4 / 18.4 knots
