= St Mary's Church, Pembroke =

Church in Pembrokeshire, Wales

St Mary's Church
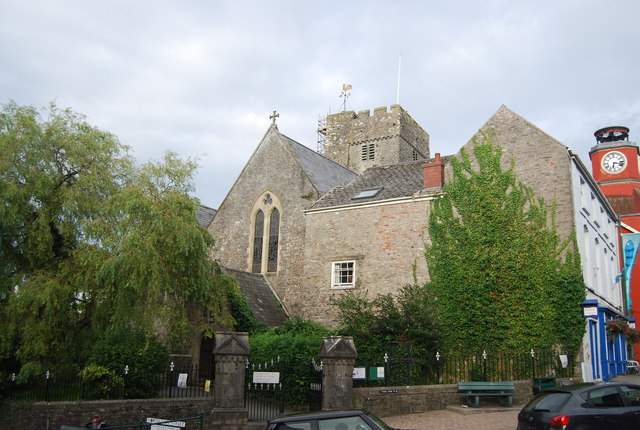

- Location within Pembrokeshire

General information
- Location: Pembroke, Pembrokeshire, Wales
- Coordinates: 51°40′35″N 4°55′04″W

St Mary the Virgin is a church located in the town of Pembroke in Pembrokeshire, west Wales. The church is in the Diocese of St Davids within the Church in Wales, and members of the Anglican Communion. Since 2004, it has been a part of the Monkton Rectorial Benefice.

== History and description ==
The present day church dates back to the 13th century, although it is speculated that there might have existed an earlier church of St Mary. The building is constructed from stone, with a slate roof. Two original windows remain in the south wall of the building, the remainder are 19th century replacements.

The tower located to the north east of the building dates from the middle of the 14th century, and currently contains a ring of eight bells. The original bells were installed in 1763, two were added in 1765 and a further two added in 1897.

The font at the church dates back to late Norman times. King Henry VII, born at nearby Pembroke Castle, was probably baptised at the church, though no evidence of the event exists.

The modern entrance to the church is through a porch on the west side of the building, erected in 1926, accessed from the corner of Northgate Street and Main Street. The historical entrance was through the south side of the church, this doorway now leads to the choir vestry.

The church had fallen into a state of disrepair towards the end of the 19th century and closed in 1875. Four years later, major renovation work was carried out under the supervision of John Loughborough Pearson before the church reopened. The current pulpit was donated to the church a year later. The church was Grade I listed in 1951, being of exceptional architectural and historical interest. In addition, the north, east and west walls of the churchyard and the walls from the north of the churchyard to Barnard's Tower were Grade II listed in 1981, and the gates at the south-west entrance along with the railings to the south and west sides of the churchyard were Grade II listed in 2005.
