= Thornton, Pembrokeshire =

Village in Pembrokeshire, Wales

Coordinates: 51.729818°N 5.036735°W

Thornton
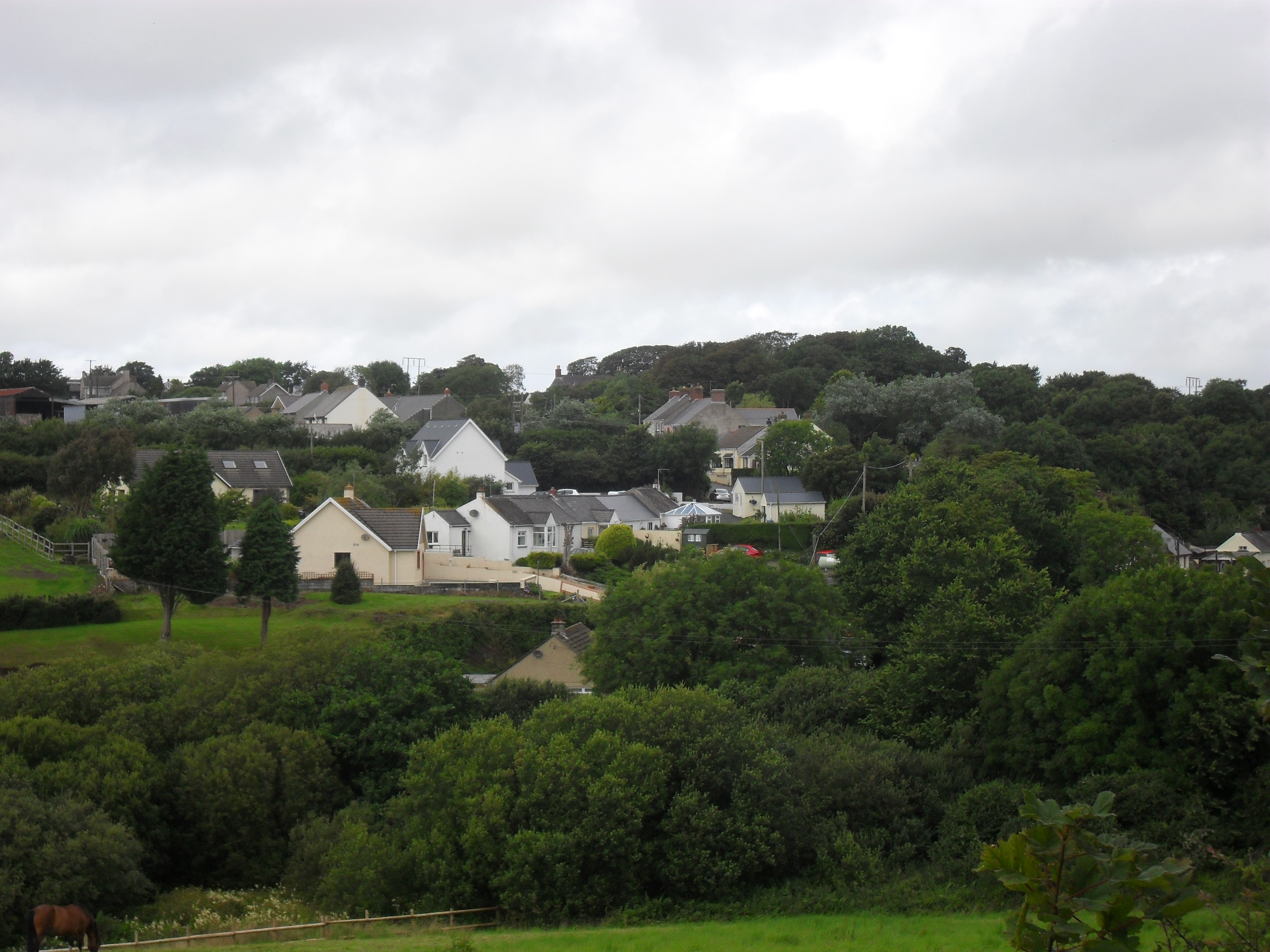
- View of Thornton, located next to a natural valley

- Location within Pembrokeshire
- Population: 1,000
- OS grid reference: SM905075
- Community: Tiers Cross
- Principal area: Pembrokeshire
- Preserved county: Dyfed
- Country: Wales
- Sovereign state: United Kingdom
- Post town: MILFORD HAVEN
- Postcode district: SA73
- Dialling code: 01646
- Police: Dyfed-Powys
- Fire: Mid and West Wales
- Ambulance: Welsh
- UK Parliament: Preseli Pembrokeshire

Thornton is a small village in Pembrokeshire, Wales. It is located approximately 1 mile outside of Milford Haven belonging to the Tiers Cross community. It is mainly residential in nature. Until recently it was contained within the parish of Steynton.

== Features ==
=== Prehistoric fort ===
The Iron Age fort, Thornton Rath, was a defensive enclosure, whose remains can still be seen. It sits on a promontory, above two valleys, and ditches and banks are all that remains. The earthwork measures 88m by 58m.

=== Listed building ===
There is a Grade II listed building in the village, now called Sunnybank, once a part of Thornton House, and possibly the coachman's house, dating from about 1800.

=== Milford Haven Cemetery ===
The cemetery for Milford Haven and Steynton parish is in Thornton. There is a large number of military graves, including those of men who lost their lives in landing craft that foundered off the Welsh coast.

=== Chapel ===
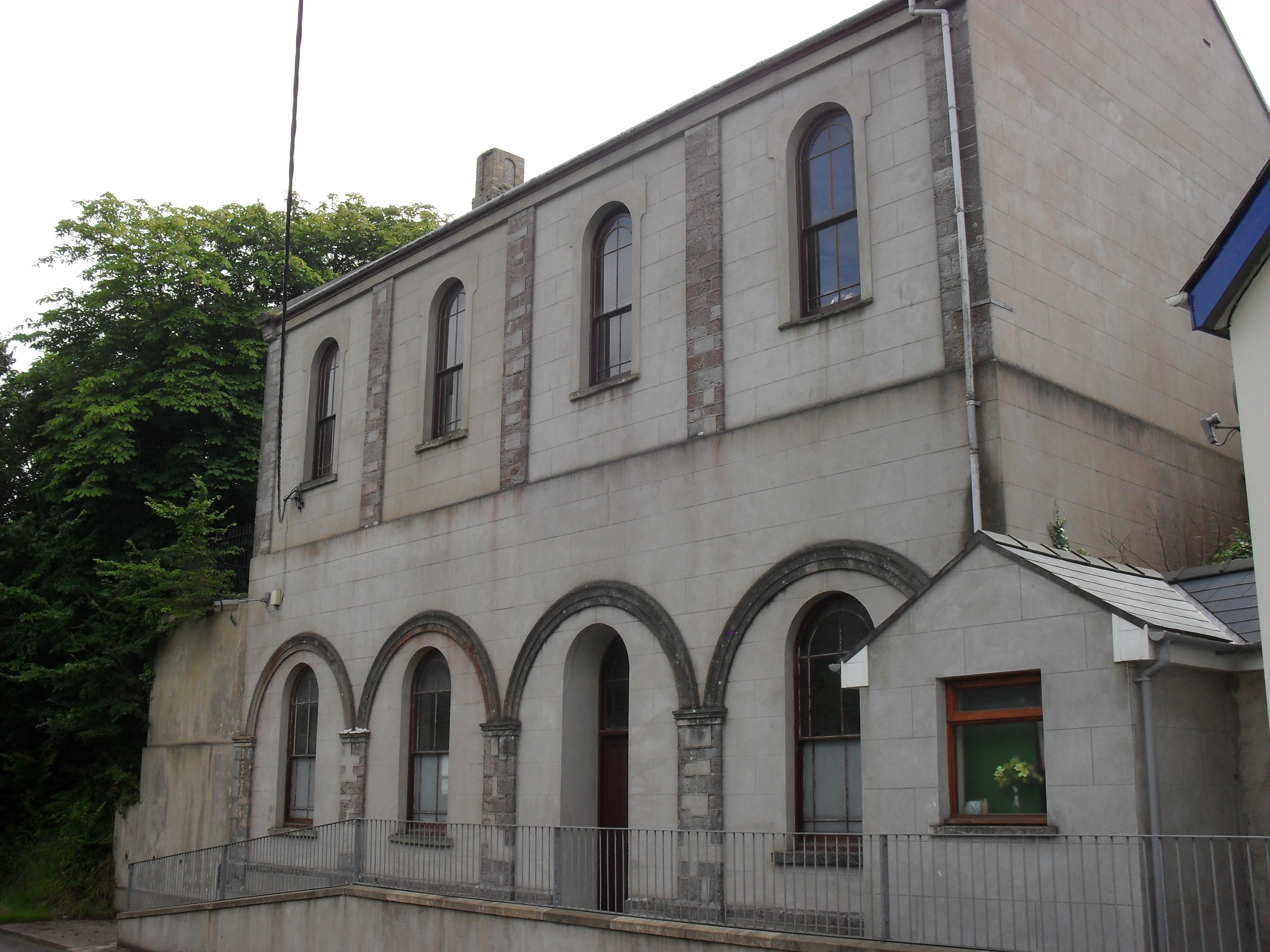
Thornton Baptist Chapel

Thornton Baptist Chapel was built in 1867 in simple round-headed style, and housed a British School in its lower level. Records are held by Pembrokeshire County Council.
