= Milford Haven Waterway =

Natural harbour in south-west Wales

Coordinates: 51.7°N 5.113°W

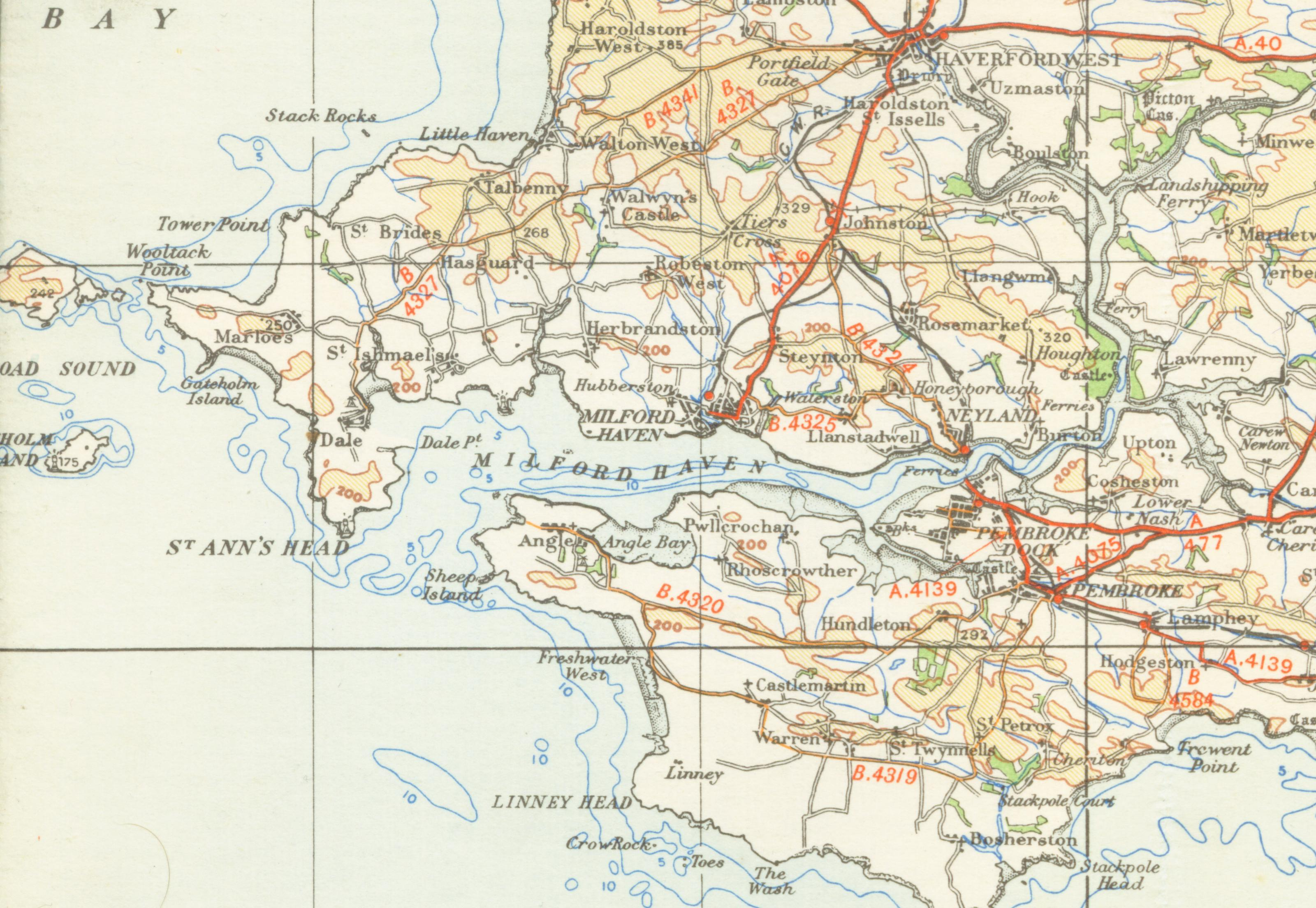
Milford Haven on a 1946 map

Milford Haven Waterway (Welsh: Dyfrffordd Aberdaugleddau), or simply Milford Haven (Welsh: Aberdaugleddau), is a natural harbour in Pembrokeshire, Wales. It is a ria or drowned valley which was flooded at the end of the last ice age. The Daugleddau estuary winds west to the sea. As one of the deepest natural harbours in the world, it is a busy shipping channel, trafficked by ferries from Pembroke Dock to Ireland, oil tankers and pleasure craft. Admiral Horatio Nelson, visiting the haven with the Hamiltons, described it as the next best natural harbour to Trincomalee in Ceylon (today's Sri Lanka) and "the finest port in Christendom". Much of the coastline of the Waterway is designated as a Site of Special Scientific Interest, listed as Milford Haven Waterway SSSI.

== Toponymy ==
The name Milford derives from the Old Norse Melfjǫrðr, meaning "fjord of the sandbank". The English word haven was added to the name in the 14th century. The harbour is known in Welsh as Aberdaugleddau, meaning "mouth of the Daugleddau". The latter name means "both Cleddaus", the Daugleddau being formed by the junction of the Eastern Cleddau River and the Western Cleddau River.

== History ==
=== Early history ===
From the 790s until the Norman Invasion in 1066, the waterway was used occasionally by Vikings looking for shelter. During one visit in 854, the Viking Chieftain Hubba wintered in the Haven with 23 ships, eventually lending his name to the district of Hubberston. Evidence of metal working in the area was recently excavated, suggesting a level of industrialisation in the period 750–1100.

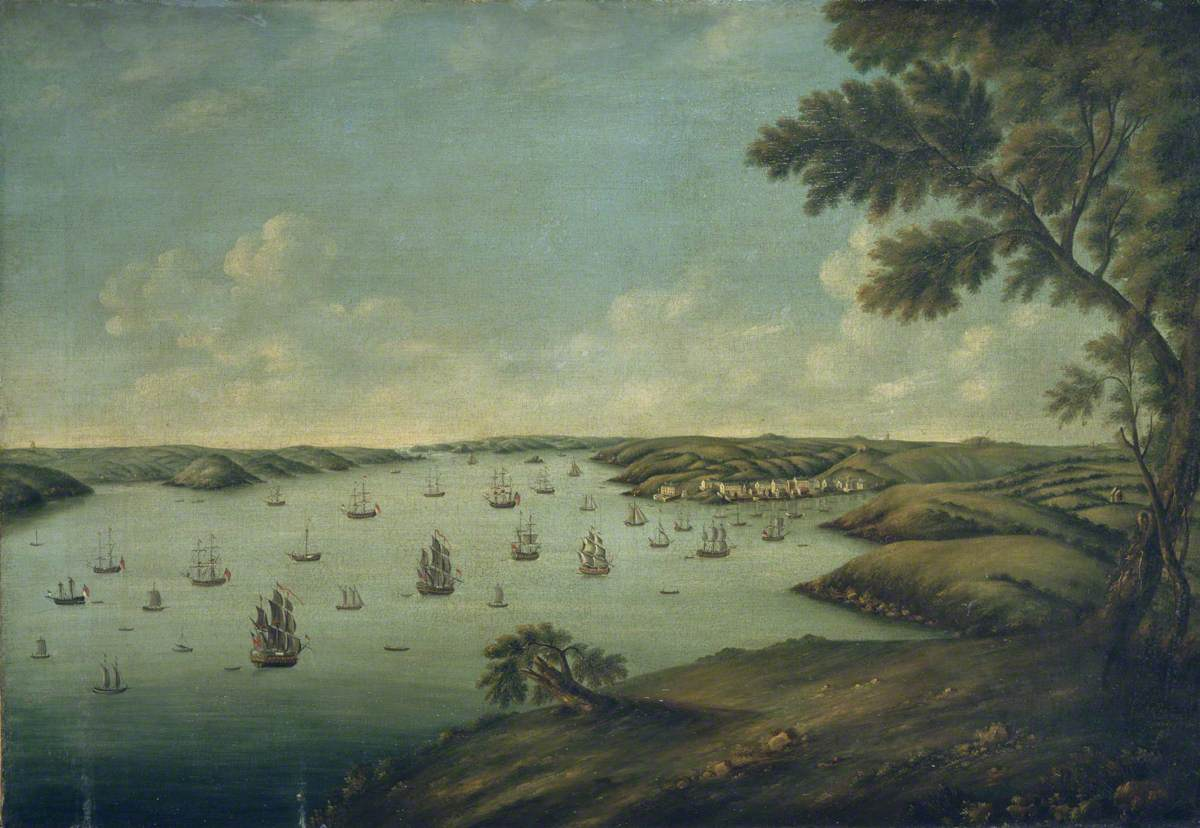
Milford Haven by Attwood, 1776

A Benedictine priory (Pill Priory) was established at the head of Hubberston Pill in 1170, as a daughter house of St Dogmaels Abbey. Built on virgin land, it stood alongside the priory on Caldey Island as part of the Tironian Order in West Wales, and was dedicated to St Budoc. Founded by Adam de Rupe, it stood until the Dissolution under Henry VIII. In 1171 Henry II designated the area the rendezvous for his Irish expedition. An army of 400 warships, 500 knights and 4,000 men-at-arms gathered in the haven before sailing to Waterford, and on to Dublin, which marked the first time an English king had stood on Irish soil, and the beginning of Henry's invasion of Ireland. St Thomas a Becket chapel was dedicated in 1180, a structure which looked out over the Haven from the north shore of the town. In later years it was used as a beacon for sailors in foul weather, and ultimately as a pig sty, until it was reconsecrated in the 20th century.

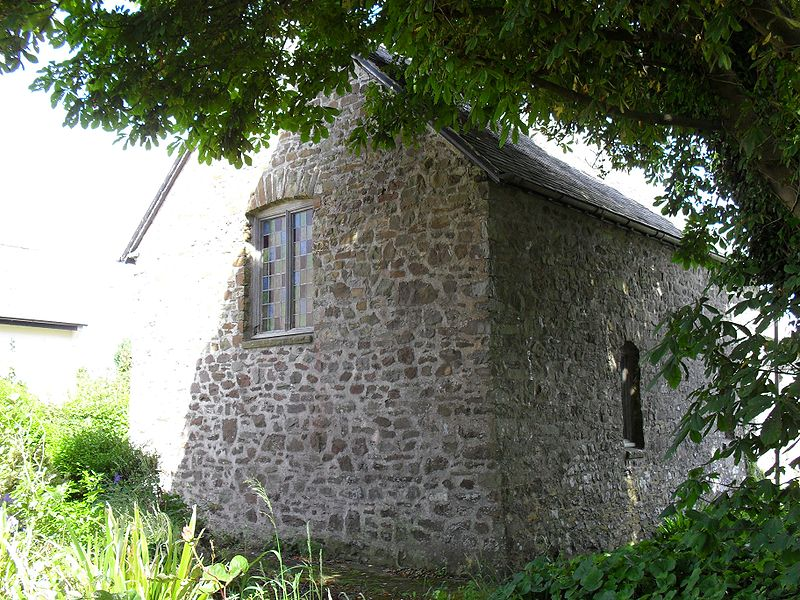
St Thomas a Becket Chapel, dedicated 1180 and used as a beacon church

In his play, Cymbeline Act 3, Scene 2 (1611), Shakespeare remarks:

... how far it is to this same blessed Milford: and by the way tell me how Wales was made so happy as to inherit such a haven ...

By 1590, two forts had been constructed to defend the entrance to the haven. George Owen of Henllys, in his Description of Penbrokshire, claimed in 1603 that Milford Haven was the most famous port of Christendom. The area however was a source of anxiety for the Tudor monarchy. Its location exposed it to attacks from Ireland, potentially leading to an invasion of England via Wales. In 1405, the French landed in force having left Brest in July with more than twenty-eight hundred knights and men-at-arms led by Jean II de Rieux, the Marshal of France, to support Owain Glyndŵr's rebellion.

In April 1603, Martin Pring used the Haven as his departure point for his exploratory voyage to Virginia. The land comprising the site of Milford, the Manor of Hubberston and Pill, was acquired by the Barlow family following the dissolution of the monasteries in the mid-16th century. It acquired an additional strategic importance in the 17th century as a Royalist military base. Charles I ordered a fort to be built at Pill by Royalist forces and completed in 1643 to prevent Parliamentarian forces from landing at Pembroke Castle and to protect Royalist forces landing from Ireland. On 23 February 1644, a Parliamentarian force led by Rowland Laugharne crossed the Haven and landed at Pill. The fort was gunned from both land and water, and a garrison was placed in Steynton church to prevent a Royalist attack from the garrison at Haverfordwest. The fort was eventually surrendered, and quickly taken, along with St Thomas a Becket chapel. Just five years later in 1649 Milford Haven was again the site of Parliamentarian interest when it was chosen as the disembarkation site for Oliver Cromwell's Invasion of Ireland. Cromwell arrived in the Haven on 4 August, meeting George Monck, before Cromwell and over a hundred crafts left for Dublin on 15 August.

By the late 18th century, the two creeks which would delimit the future town of Milford's boundaries to the east and west, namely Hakin and Castle Pill, were being used as ports for ships to load and unload coal, corn and limestone., A ferry service to Ireland operated from Hakin around the start of the 19th century, although this ceased in the early 19th century. Although surrounding settlements at Steynton, Thornton, Priory, Liddeston and Hubberston/Hakin were established, they were little more than hamlets. The only man-made structures on the future site of Milford were the medieval chapel, and Summer Hill Farm, and its accompanying cottages.

=== Landscape and history ===
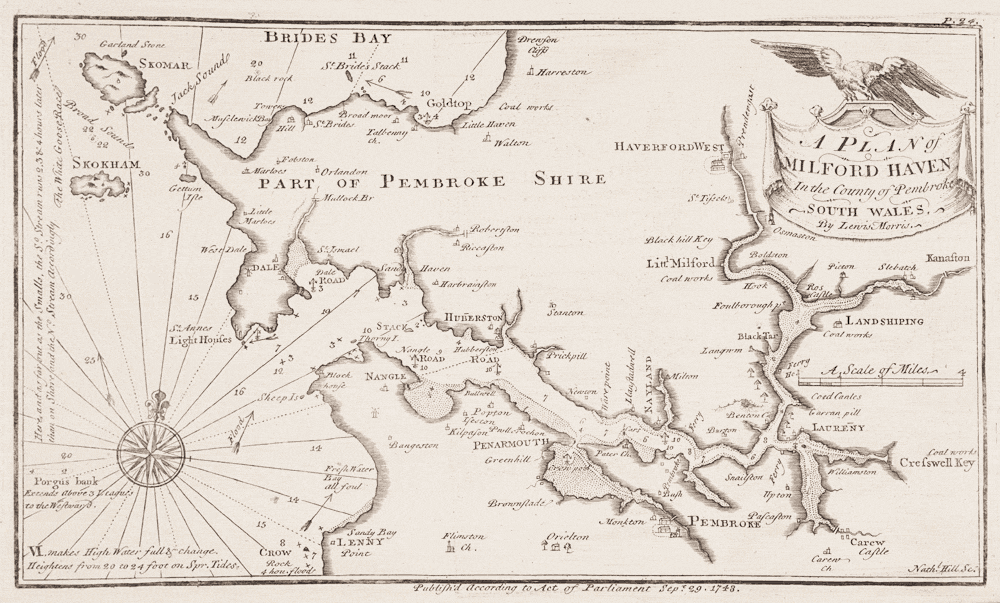
A plan of Milford Haven from a 1748 survey

Parts of the Haven are within the Pembrokeshire Coast National Park. The northern side is within the Preseli Environmentally Sensitive Area. The area includes: Angle Bay, Carew and Cresswell Rivers, Cosheston Pill, Daugleddau, Gann Estuary, Pembroke River, Pwllcrochan Flats and West Williamston Quarries (Sites of Special Scientific Interest); and the towns of Carew, Haverfordwest, Llangwm, Milford Haven, Neyland and Pembroke, and the Pembroke Dock (Royal Dockyard) Conservation Areas.

The littoral landscape of Milford Haven shows evidence of maritime conquest, settlement, commerce, fishing and defence from the 11th century to the 20th century. Iron Age promontory forts are sited on several of the headlands at the entrance and along the course of the Haven and the Daugleddau. Early medieval, Christian and Viking sites are evidenced by place-names, documentary and epigraphic evidence, such as Early Christian Inscribed Stone monuments. The Norman conquest, achieved by coastally sited castle boroughs, is still obvious at Pembroke, at Haverfordwest, and at Carew. Carew did not develop into a borough, but excavations have shown that a Dark Age stronghold and possible Romano-British site preceded the Norman castle.

Around the start of the 19th century, two new towns were constructed: Milford in 1790 by Sir William Hamilton, and Pembroke Dock in 1802 as the site for a new Royal Naval Dockyard. Both towns have regular planned layouts, both have experienced a history of boom and slump in shipbuilding, fishing and as railheads and ocean terminals. These two towns, which could handle the larger vessels then entering service, concentrated trade that had previously been dispersed at quays, jetties and landing places and small settlements such as Pennar, Lawrenny, Landshipping and Cosheston further up river. These small ports served the coal mines of the Pembrokeshire Coalfield located on both shores of the Daugleddau, and also the large limestone quarries at West Williamston. The Daugleddau ports flourished in the 16th, 17th and 18th centuries, but continued to work through the 19th century by changing to using barges to tranship cargoes down river to bigger vessels at the mid-Haven ports.

In the late 19th century, concerns about the potential threat posed by the French Navy prompted the construction of a number of Palmerston Forts at various strategically important coastal sites, including Milford Haven. Most of the forts are now disused. The late 20th century brought the jetties, oil terminals and shore processing facilities of the oil and power industries. This industry reached its zenith in the 1970s when Middle Eastern supply difficulties forced oil transport to use ocean routes and Very Large Crude Carriers for which the Haven, with its deep waters and westerly position, was particularly suited.

== Port ==
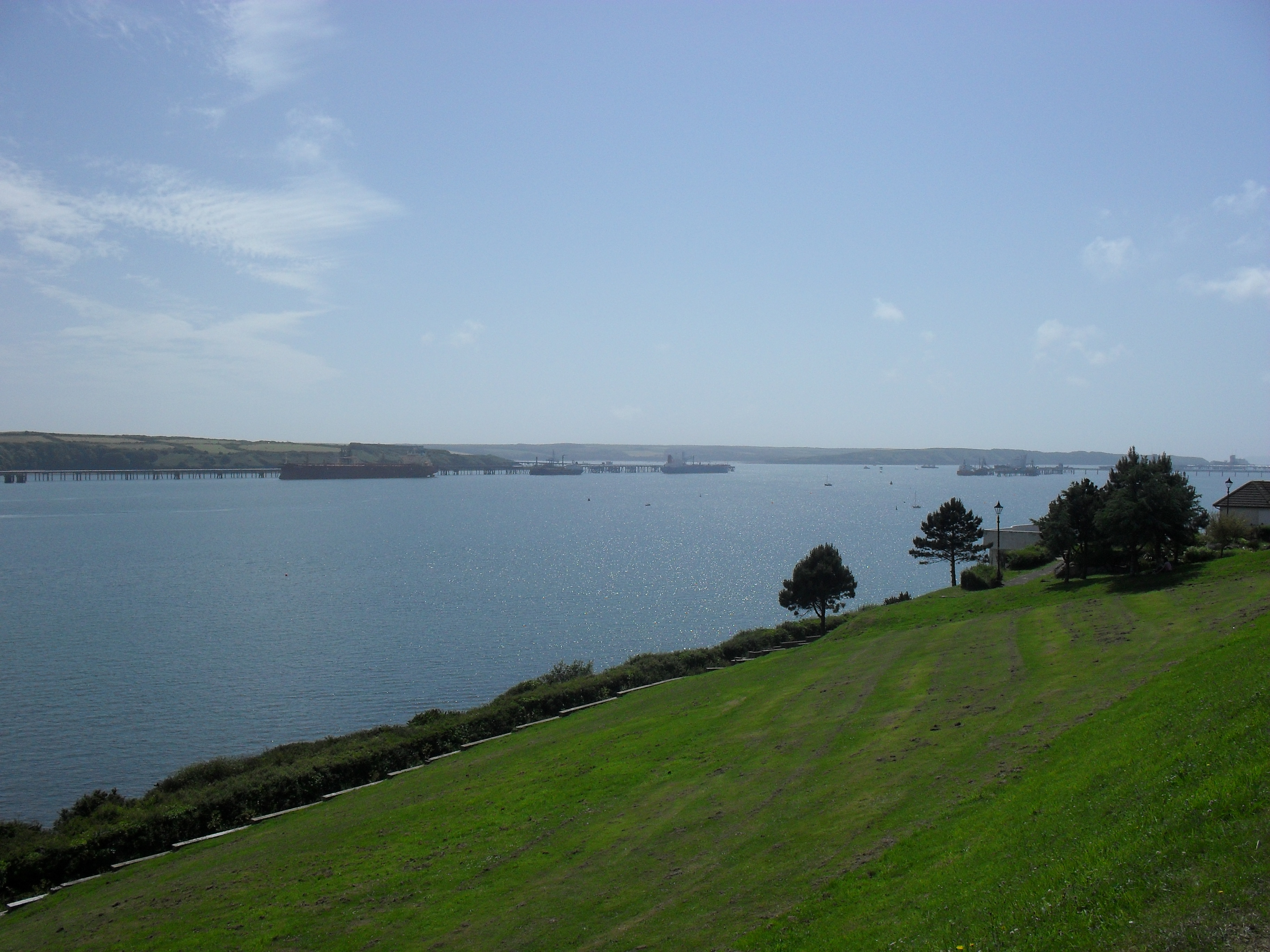
The haven viewed from the town

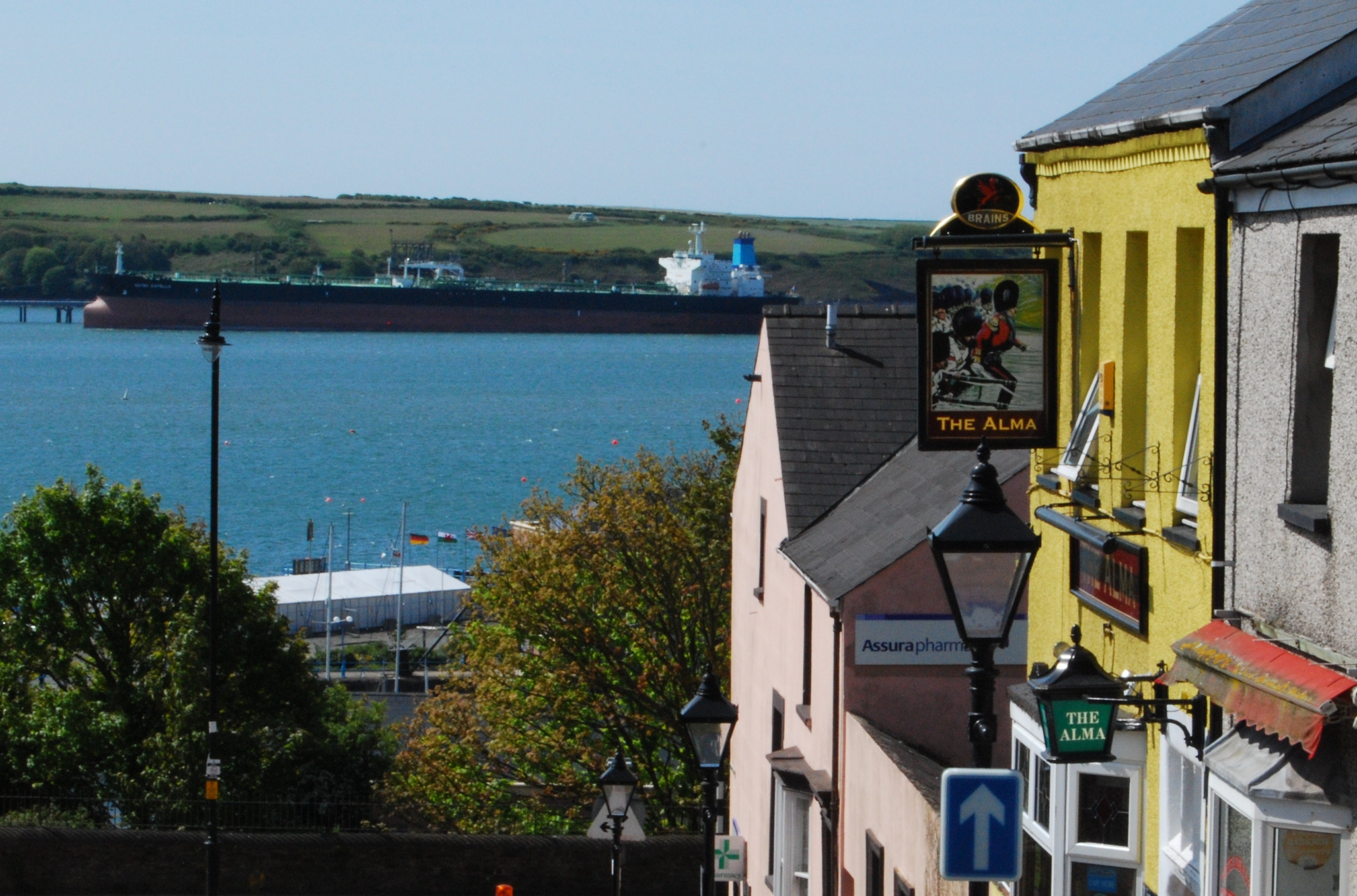
The harbour viewed from the town

Milford Haven is the largest port in Wales, and the third-largest port in the United Kingdom. Shipping operations in Milford Haven are managed by the independent Milford Haven Port Authority as a trust port. The port authority has responsibility for managing Milford Docks, Milford Marina and Pembroke Port and Ferry Terminal. In 2012, it was announced that the Milford waterway was to be declared an Enterprise Zone by the coalition government, due to its importance to the energy sector.

=== Petrochemical industry ===
Milford Haven's association with the petro-chemical industry started with the opening of the first oil terminal and oil refinery in 1960; unfortunately this coincided with a serious oil-spill from Esso Portsmouth, the first oil tanker to unload there. Since then, there have been numerous spills of varying magnitude, providing the port authority with a great deal of experience. Uniquely at the time, the harbourmaster instituted the principle of cleaning up first and allocating the blame (and the responsibility of paying for it) later. There are two large oil refineries nearby which represent one fifth of the United Kingdom's oil refining capacity.

In 1978 the tanker Christos Bitas ran aground off the Haven, spilling a portion of its cargo of oil. In 1984, a serious explosion on a tanker being repaired in the Haven resulted in three fatalities. In 1996, it was the location of the Sea Empress oil spill, initially thought to be one of the most devastating oil tanker disasters the UK has ever seen. In the event, recovery has been surprisingly good, perhaps partly because of the very strong tides. The comparable Torrey Canyon spill in 1968, a ship which had been heading to Milford Haven, affected shores further south around southern Cornwall and northern France, was actually far more damaging.

=== Liquefied natural gas ===
In light of the dwindling supplies of North Sea gas, Milford Haven has become home to two new LNG terminals which eventually could provide 25% of the UK's gas requirement. Under construction from 2006, South Hook is based on the former Esso refinery facility, while the Dragon LNG terminal is based on a brownfield site of the Gulf oil refinery, now also housing SEMLogistics chemicals. The regasified natural gas is fed through National Grid plc's South Wales Gas Pipeline to the distribution point at Tirley, Gloucestershire. The first vessel, the Q-Flex-class Tembek from Qatar, docked at South Hook on 20 March 2009. The first gas to the Dragon facility was delivered 14 July 2009.

=== Cruise ship terminal ===
The port authority started promoting Pembrokeshire as a cruise destination in 2003 and passenger numbers have steadily increased since then. In July 2008, the first transatlantic liner, the Maasdam arrived in Milford Haven.

== Town ==
The town of Milford Haven was founded as a whaling center in the 18th century, and today the town's port is the fourth largest in the United Kingdom in terms of tonnage and plays an important role in the United Kingdom's energy sector with several oil refineries and one of the biggest LNG terminals in the world. Milford Haven is the second largest settlement in Pembrokeshire, with a population of 13,100; though its community boundaries make it the most populous in the county, with 13,096 people. As a community, Milford Haven takes in the town of Milford Haven itself and the villages of Hakin, Hubberston, Liddeston, Steynton and Thornton.

== Power generation ==
As a first stage of a wave power plant, there will be some testing at West Dale Bay.

== Contaminants ==
Organic and heavy metal chemical pollutants accumulating in variety of species including seaweed mussels, bivalves and worms have been measured in Milford Haven Waterway. This together with information on the sediment concentrations have been assessed in order to aid in the evaluation of the environmental quality of the ria estuary.
