= Pembroke River =

River in Wales

Coordinates: 51.683°N 4.967°W

Pembroke River is a short waterway near Pembroke, Pembrokeshire, West Wales.

== Course ==
Rising at Hogeston Hill, near Manorbier Newton, the river meanders through Lamphey and flows past Pembroke Castle to its confluence with Milford Haven Waterway at Pennar Mouth.

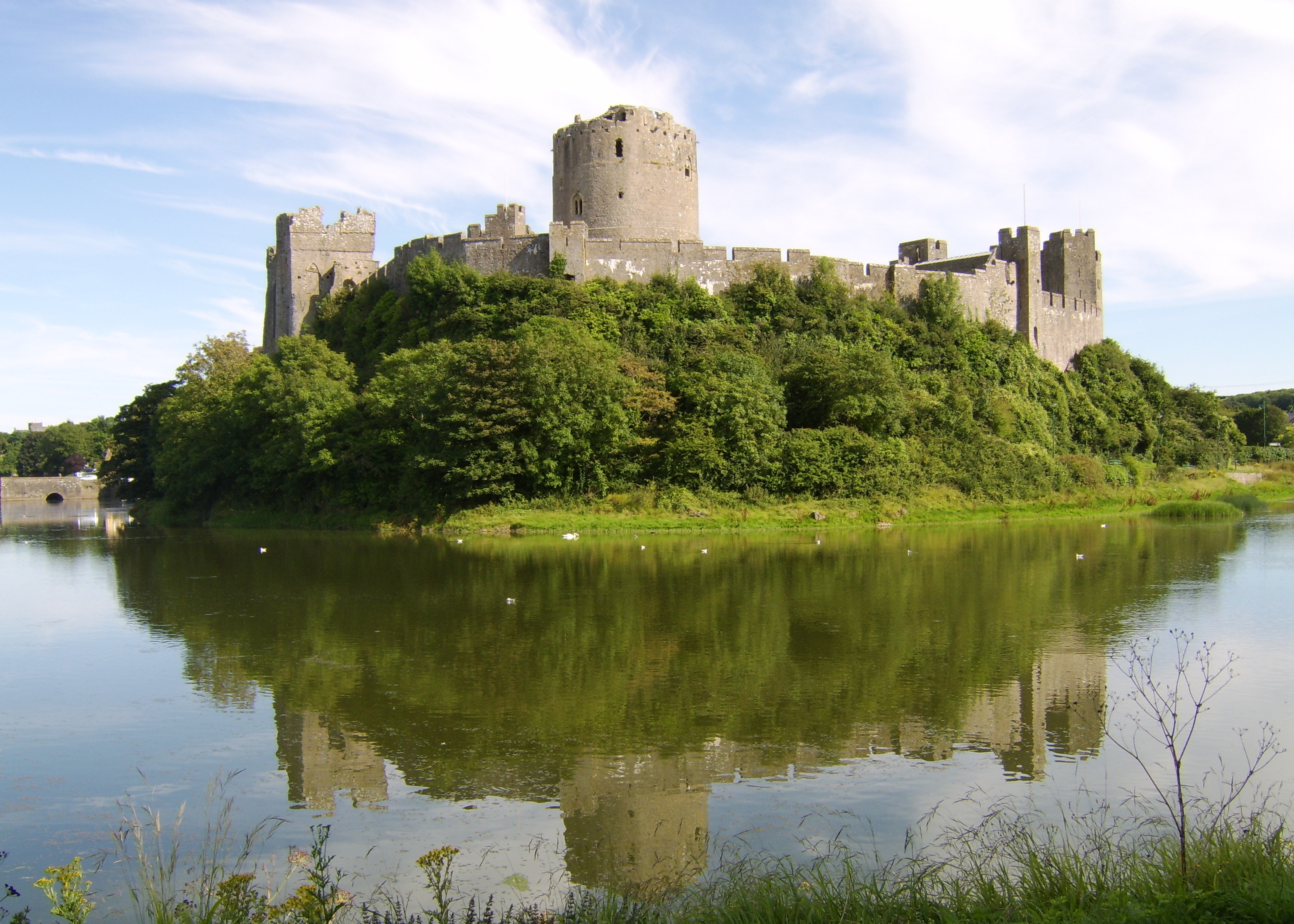
Pembroke Castle and Castle Pond

When the river reaches the town of Pembroke, there are three pools, the first of which is Mill Pond, then downstream is Middle Mill Pond, followed by Castle Pond below the castle. The river is navigable to small craft from Pennar to Mill Pond, but is normally closed at Castle Pond. A rally is held once a year to allow small craft into Castle Pond, and since 1994 an annual canoe race has been held in the river.

== History ==
An Elizabethan map of 1578 does not name the river, but does note Pennar Mouth.

In 1804, The Cambrian reproduced text from Campbell' Political Survey of Britain, quoting

Pennarmouth is the opening of that branch of the Haven upon which Pembroke town lies, where the Custom house of Milford is kept. The entrance or breadth between rock and rock, is but 200 yards at-high water, and 112 yards at low water, and from nine to twelve feet deep. The navigation up this river to Pembroke town is much impeded by the rubbish of the lime-stone quarries being thrown into the river, which ought to be prevented, or the place, in process of time, will be stopped up. Within Pennarmouth a dock might be made which would contain all the vessels in England, and which would be, perhaps, the greatest thing in the world of that kind.

A dockyard was built soon afterwards, not on the Pembroke River, but on the River Cleddau just to the north, which became Pembroke Dockyard, developing into the town of Pembroke Dock. Writing in 1810, Richard Fenton notes that there is a Pembroke Ferry, although he does not name the river, which may have been across the Cleddau. The River Pembroke, though, was clearly still an important waterway, as Lewis's Topographical Dictionary of 1833 describes:

The town is beautifully situated on an elevated ridge projecting into the head of the Pennar Mouth Pill, forming the largest southern creek of Milford Haven, and which it divides into two branches, by which, at high water, it is nearly insulated and over each of which is a neat bridge of stone...the inhabitants consisting of persons of small independent fortune, shop keepers, publicans, and a few whose business is at the dock.

Lewis also refers to the river as "a branch of Milford Harbour (which) terminates at the town". Further, it says:

The entrance from Milford Haven to the creek at the head of which the town of Pembroke is situated, at low water, is little more than a hundred yards wide, and from nine to twelve feet deep; but proceeding upwards it immediately expands into a wide oozy reach, called Crow Pool, containing an abundance of excellent oysters.

In February 1889 the river was the scene of a tragedy when the Bentlass ferry boat capsized and sank, drowning all 16 passengers and crew.

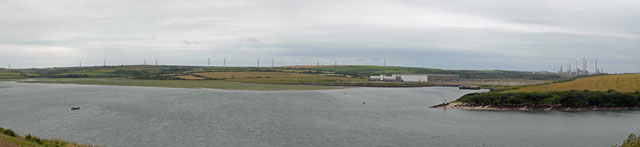
Pembroke River from Pennar Mouth
