= Pembroke Castle =

Medieval castle in Wales

- Pembroke, Pembrokeshire, Wales
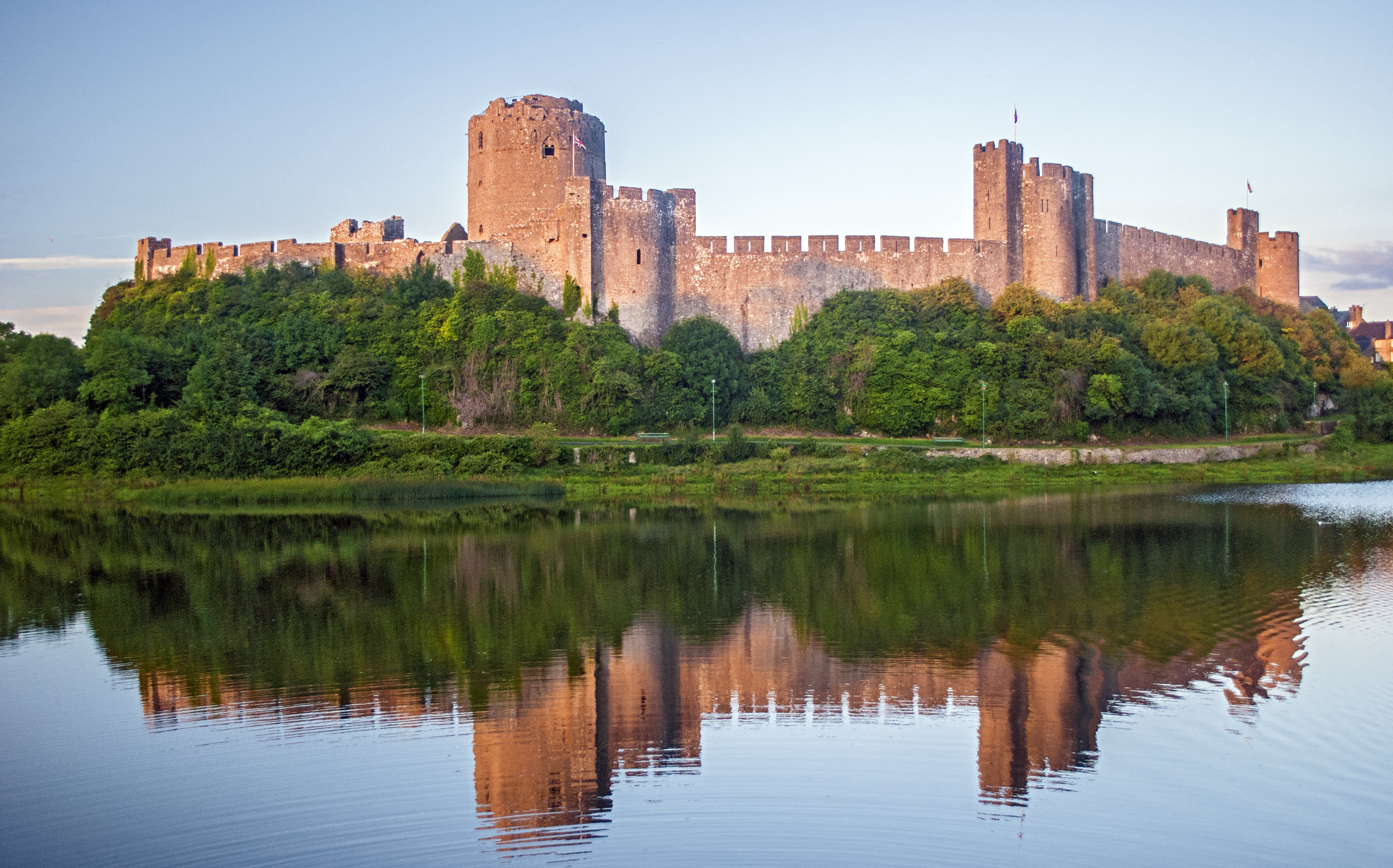

Site information
- Type: Linear castle
- Owner: Philipps family
- Controlled by: Philipps family Pembroke Town Council
- Open to the public: Yes
- Condition: Partially restored

Location
- Coordinates: 51°40′37″N 4°55′14″W
- Height: Up to 75 ft (23 m)

Site history
- Built: 1093; 1189–1218; 1234–1241
- Built by: Arnulf of Montgomery; William Marshal; Gilbert Marshal
- In use: Until mid 17th century
- Materials: Siltstone Ashlar; Mortar; Timber
- Battles/wars: Siege of Pembroke

Listed Building – Grade I

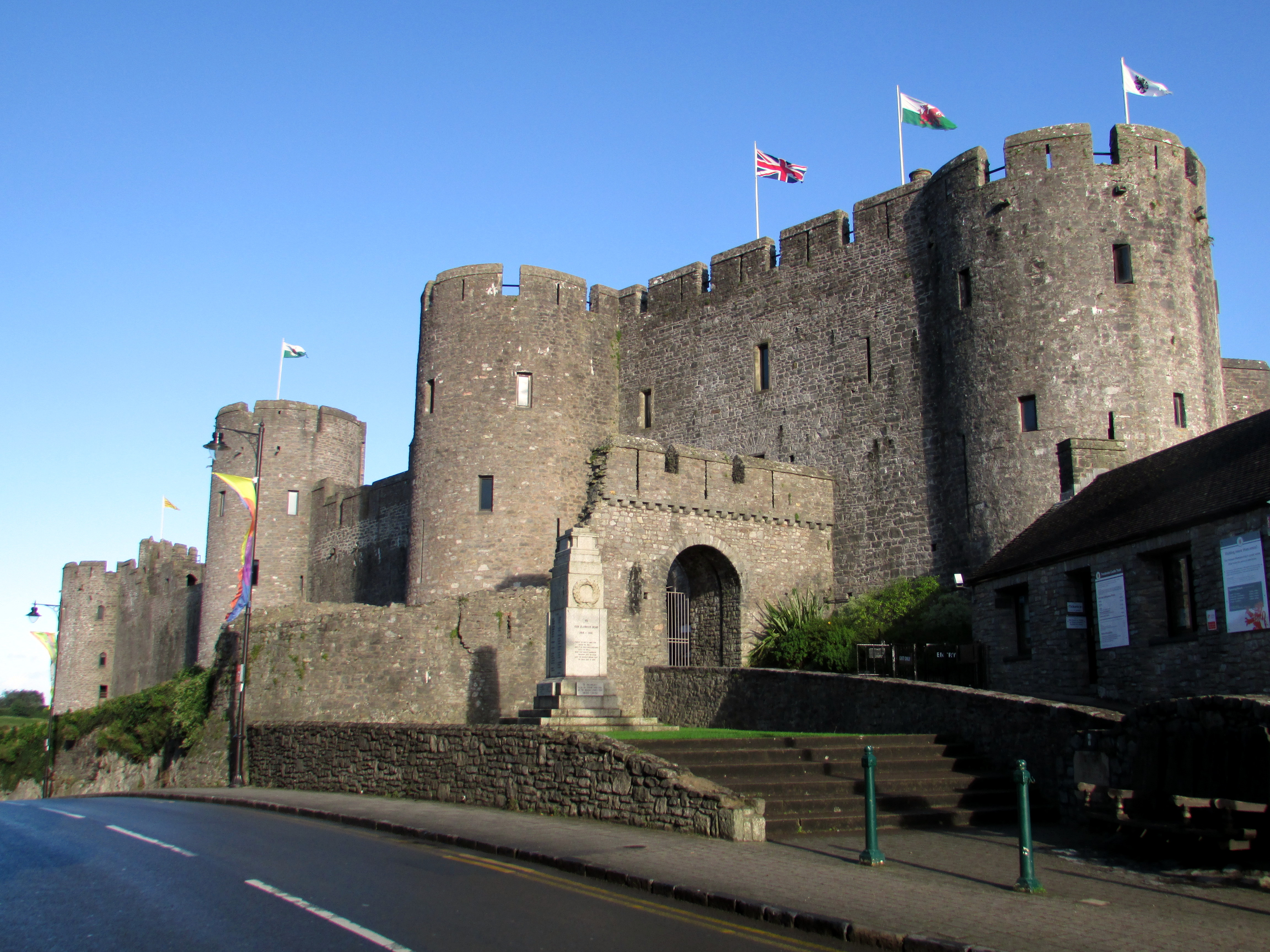
Pembroke Castle, street view

Pembroke Castle (Welsh: Castell Penfro) is a medieval castle in the centre of Pembroke, Pembrokeshire in Wales. The castle was the original family seat of the Earldom of Pembroke. A Grade I listed building since 1951, it underwent major restoration during the early 20th century.

In 1093, Arnulf of Montgomery built the first castle at the site when he fortified the promontory beside the Pembroke River during the Norman invasion of Wales. A century later, the castle was given by Richard I to William Marshal, who became one of the most powerful men in 12th-century Britain. He rebuilt Pembroke Castle in stone, creating most of the structure that remains today. The castle is open to the public and is the largest privately owned castle in Wales, with its ownership held in a trust.

== Construction ==
The castle is sited on a strategic rocky promontory by the Milford Haven Waterway. The first fortification on the site was a Norman motte-and-bailey. It had earthen ramparts and a timber palisade.

The inner ward, which was constructed in 1189, contains the huge round keep with its domed roof. Its original first-floor entrance was through an external stairwell. Inside, a spiral staircase connected its four stories. The keep's domed roof also has several putlog holes that supported a wooden fighting-platform.

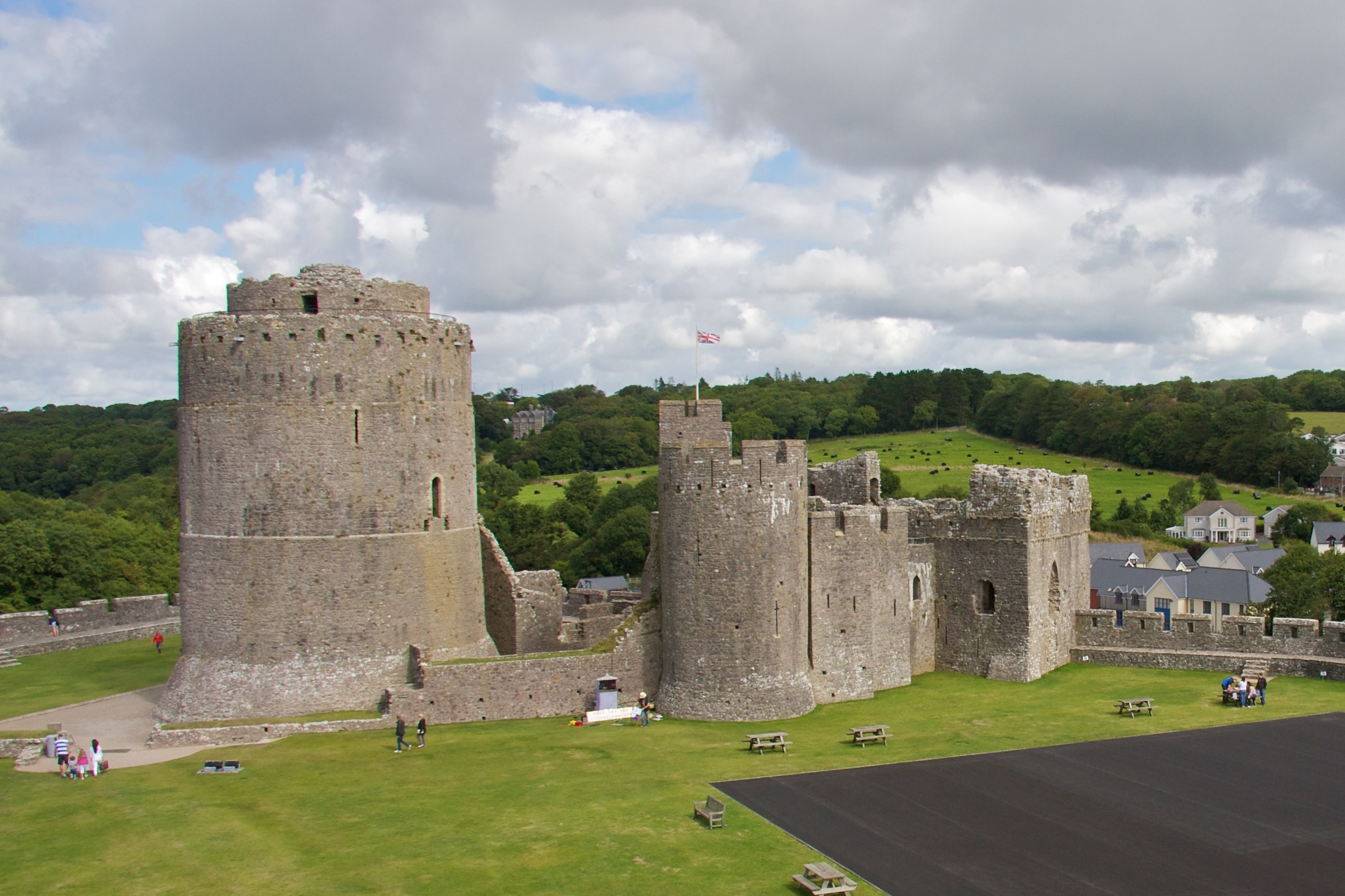
Pembroke's Great Keep viewed from the south with the inner ward behind

The inner ward's curtain wall had a large horseshoe-shaped gateway. But only a thin wall was required along the promontory. This section of the wall has a small observation turret and a square stone platform. Domestic buildings including William Marshal's Great Hall and private apartments were within the inner ward. The 13th century keep is 23 metres (75 ft) tall with walls up to 6 metres (20 ft) thick at its base.

In the late 13th century, additional buildings were added to the inner ward, including a new Great Hall. The outer ward was defended by a large twin-towered gatehouse, a barbican and several round towers.

Although Pembroke Castle is a Norman-style enclosure castle with great keep, because it was built on a rocky promontory surrounded by water, it can be more accurately described as a linear fortification.

== History ==
Pembroke Castle stands on a site that was occupied during the Roman period, and recent discoveries in Wogan Cave underneath the castle show humans occupied the site at the end of the last ice age. Roger of Montgomery founded the first castle here in 1073. The castle was established at the heart of the Norman-controlled lands of southwest Wales.

Roger's son Arnulf strengthened the castle and appointed Gerald de Windsor as his castellan at Pembroke, after which it withstood a major siege in 1092. When William Rufus died, Arnulf de Montgomery joined his elder brother, Robert of Bellême, in rebellion against Henry I, William's brother and successor as king; when the rebellion failed, he was forced to forfeit his lands and titles. Henry appointed his castellan, but when the chosen ally turned out to be incompetent, the King reappointed Gerald in 1102. By 1138 King Stephen had given Pembroke Castle to Gilbert de Clare who used it as an important base in the Norman invasion of Ireland.

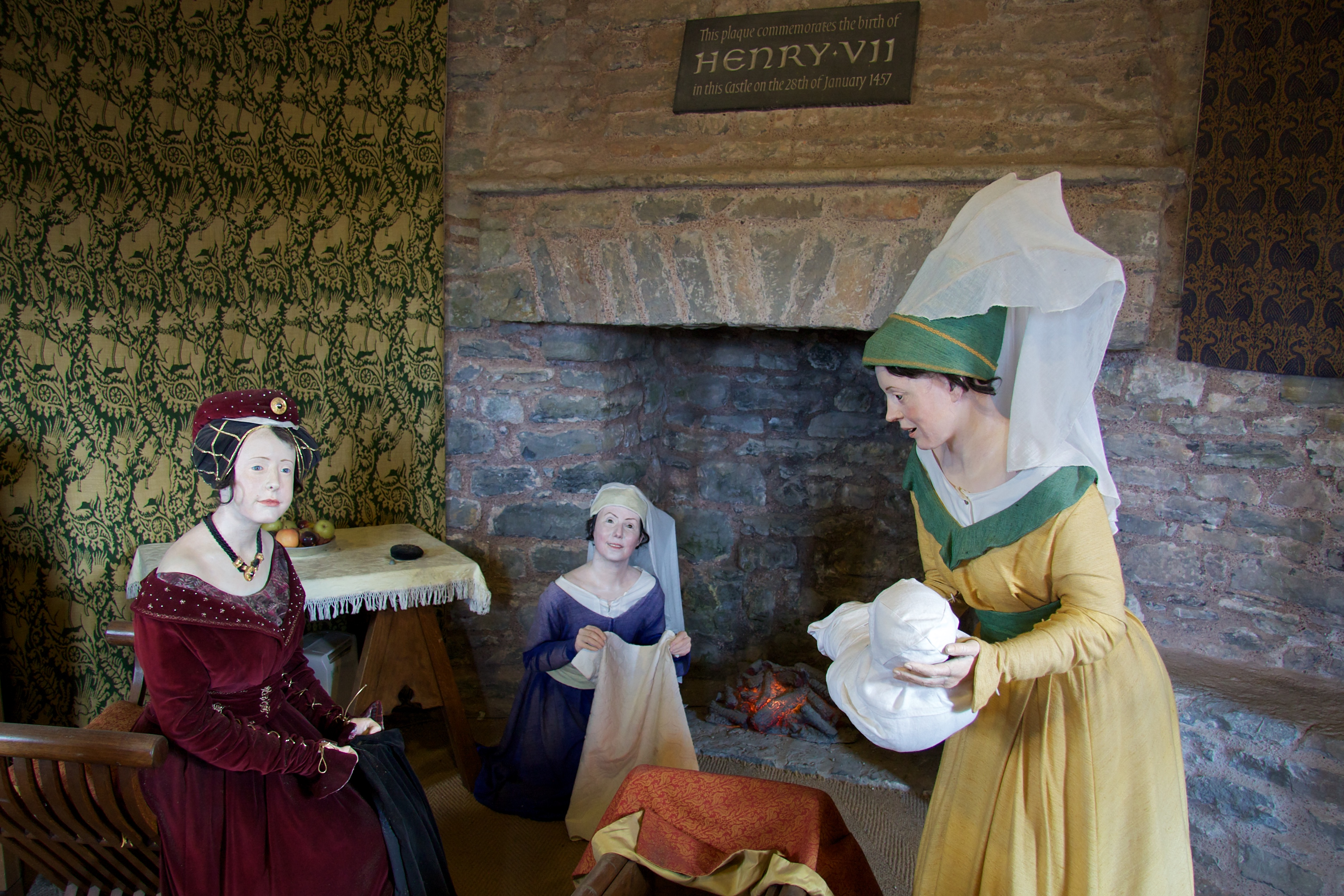
A display depicting the birth of Henry VII of England in the castle

In August 1189 Richard I arranged the marriage of Isabel, de Clare's granddaughter, to William Marshal who received both the castle and the title, Earl of Pembroke. He had the castle rebuilt in stone and established the great keep at the same time. Marshal was succeeded in turn by each of his five sons. His third son, Gilbert Marshal, was responsible for enlarging and further strengthening the castle between 1234 and 1241. All of Marshal's sons died childless. In 1247, the castle was inherited by William de Valence (a half-brother of Henry III), who had become Earl of Pembroke through his marriage to Joan de Munchensi, William Marshal's granddaughter.

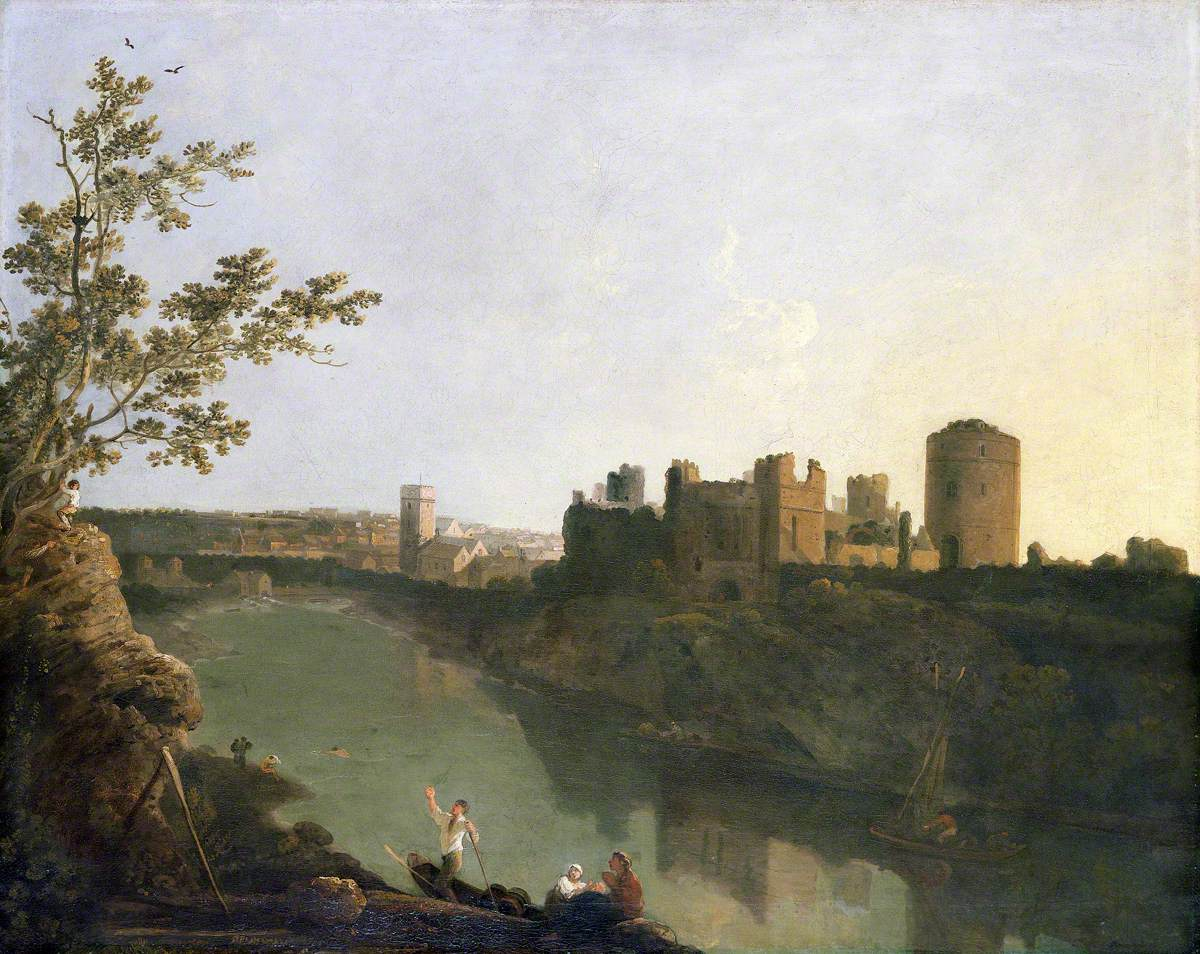
Pembroke Town and Castle by Richard Wilson, 1765

The de Valence family held Pembroke for 70 years. During this time, the town was fortified with defensive walls, three main gates and a postern. Pembroke Castle became de Valence's military base for fighting the Welsh princes during the conquest of North Wales by Edward I between 1277 and 1295. On the death of Aymer de Valence, 2nd Earl of Pembroke, William de Valence's son, the castle passed through marriage to the Hastings family. In 1389, 17-year-old John Hastings died in a jousting accident, ending a line of inheritance stretching back 250 years.

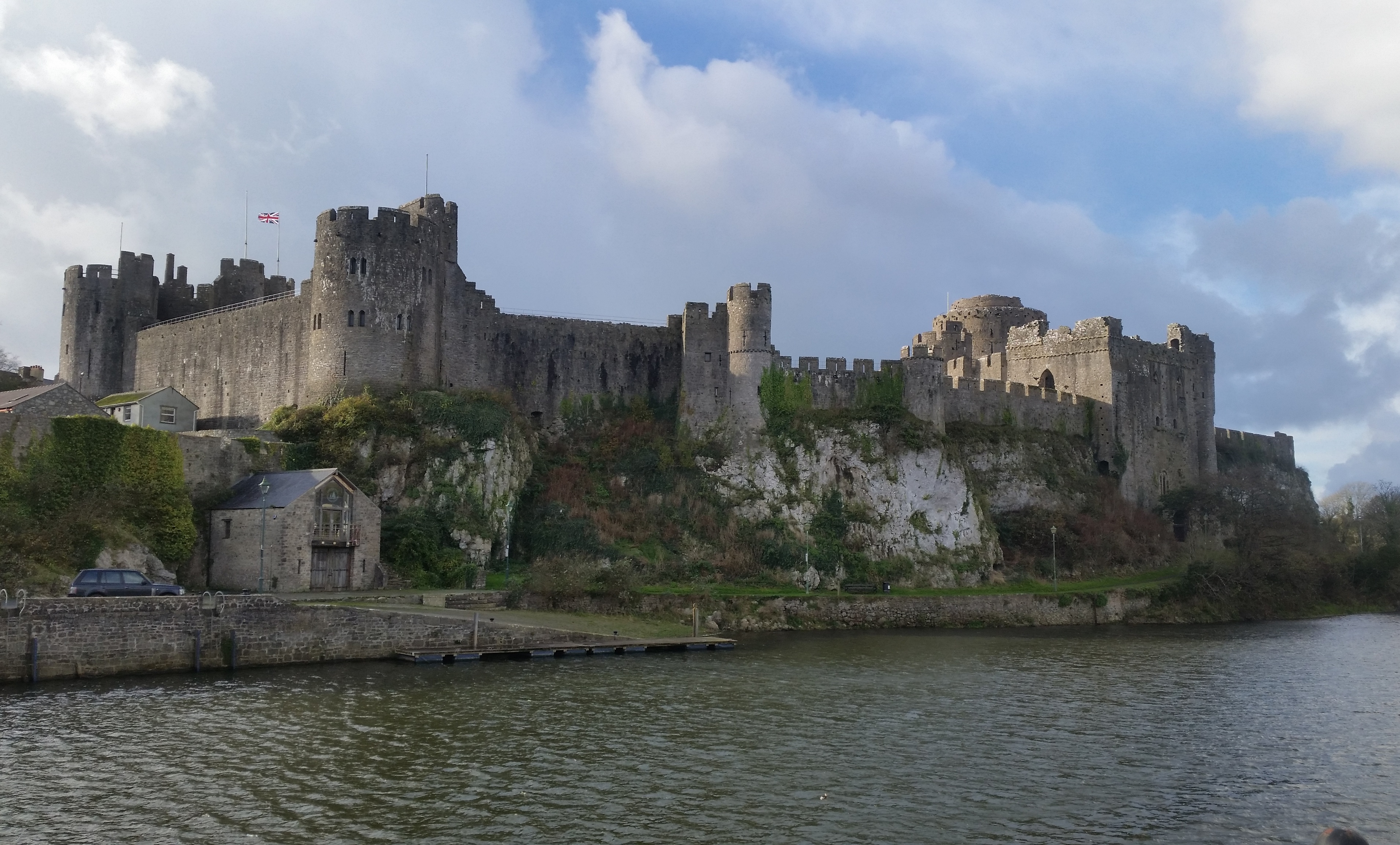
Pembroke Castle, view from the Pembroke River

Pembroke Castle then reverted to Richard II. Short tenancies were then granted by The Crown for its ownership. By 1400 Owain Glyndŵr had begun a rebellion in Wales. However, Pembroke escaped attack because the castle's Constable, Francis a Court, paid off Glyndŵr in gold. Then in 1452, the castle and the earldom were presented to Jasper Tudor by his half-brother Henry VI. Tudor brought his pregnant sister-in-law, Margaret Beaufort, to Pembroke where, in 1457, she gave birth to her only child, who was to become King Henry VII of England.

In the 15th and 16th centuries, the castle was a place of peace until the outbreak of the English Civil War. Although most of South Wales sided with the King, Pembroke declared for Parliament. It was besieged by Royalist troops but was saved after Parliamentary reinforcements arrived by sea from nearby Milford Haven. Parliamentary forces then went on to capture the Royalist castles of Tenby, Haverfordwest and Carew.

In 1648, at the beginning of the Second Civil War, Pembroke's commander Colonel John Poyer led a Royalist uprising alongside Colonel Powell, Tenby Castle, and Sir Nicholas Kemoys, Chepstow Castle. Oliver Cromwell came to Pembroke on 24 May 1648 and took the castle after a seven-week siege. Its three leaders were found guilty of treason and Cromwell ordered the castle to be destroyed. Townspeople were even encouraged to disassemble the fortress and re-use its stone for their purposes.

The castle was then abandoned and allowed to decay. It remained in ruins until 1880, when a three-year restoration project was undertaken. Nothing further was done until 1928, when Major-General Sir Ivor Philipps acquired the castle and began an extensive restoration of the castle's walls, gatehouses, and towers. After his death, a trust was set up for the castle, jointly managed by the Philipps family and Pembroke town council.

== Wogan Cavern ==
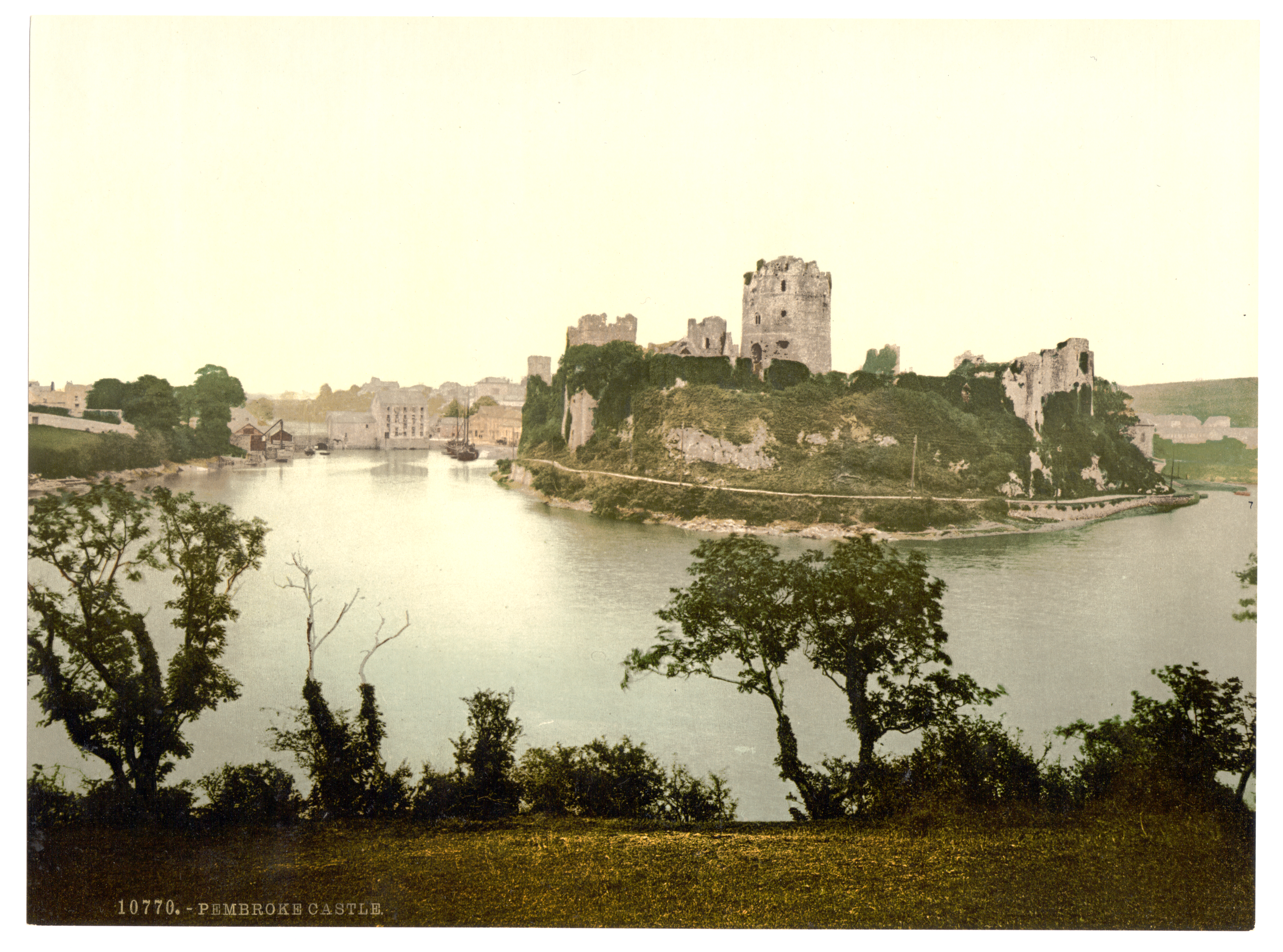
Pembroke Castle, 1890s

Wogan Cavern is a large limestone cavern underneath the castle that was formed naturally by water erosion over hundreds of thousands of years. A 55-step spiral staircase was created in the 13th century that leads beneath the castle to the cave. In the medieval era, it was fortified with a wall, a barred gateway, and arrowslits. It may have served as a boathouse or a sallyport to the river, where cargo or people could have been transferred.

The cave was long thought by archaeologists to have been emptied of historical artifacts by Victorian-era diggers. However, excavations that began in 2021 have revealed intact sediment layers that make it one of the most important prehistoric sites in Britain. In July 2022, an archaeological survey funded by the Natural History Museum and the British Cave Research Society uncovered evidence of prehistoric megafauna, such as reindeer and woolly mammoth bones, in addition to seashells, pigs, and deer. According to the researchers, the cave was occupied by residents as far back as the Paleolithic and Mesolithic periods. In 2026, researchers announced the discovery of bones of a warm-weather hippopotamus that had wallowed in Welsh wetlands 120,000 years ago.

== Film location ==
Pembroke has appeared in numerous feature films. These include the 1968 film The Lion in Winter, the 1976 film Jabberwocky, the BBC adaptation of C.S. Lewis's Prince Caspian, a BBC Two film of Shakespeare's Richard II, and the 2016 Anglo-American romantic film Me Before You. It features as the fictional Penleven Castle in Cornwall in the 2015 comedy film The Bad Education Movie.
