= Linear castle =

Burg Rötteln, Germany, a linear castle with the outer defences extending down the hill.

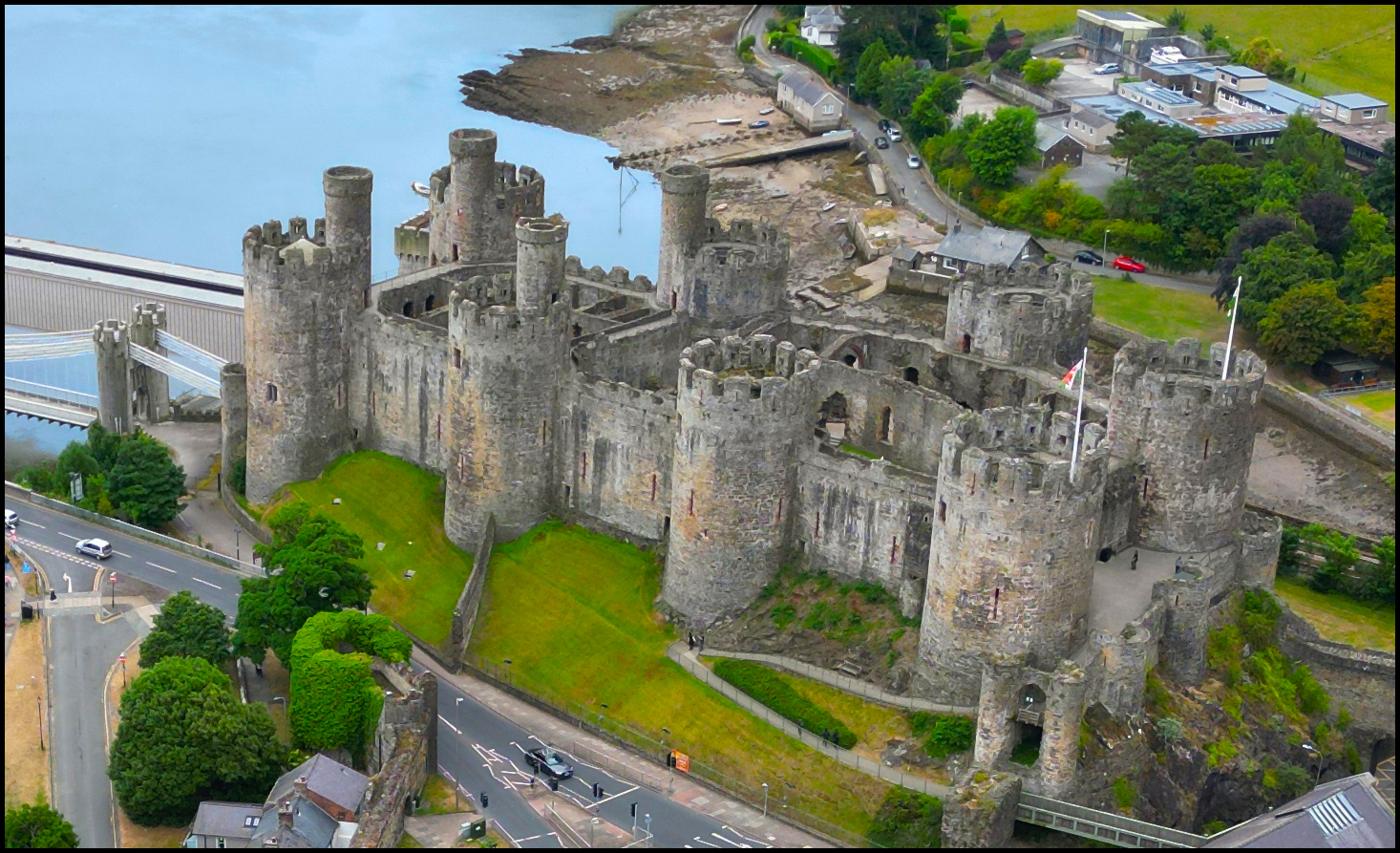
Conwy Castle, Wales. The inner ward is on the left, and the outer ward on the right.

A linear castle is a castle that was designed to confront its attackers with a series of barriers/impediments in a line (hence the name).

The principle was to funnel assaulting forces into attacking a very narrow front and focusing all of the castle's defences in that area. This would mean that both architectural devices and manpower could be concentrated, unlike the concentric castle, for which the entire circumference needed to be defended.

Linear castles tended to be built where geography favoured this approach. The Knights Hospitaller fortress of Margat in Syria is built on a narrow rocky promontory, ideal for preventing successful undermining but inappropriate for the rings of walls needed for a concentric castle. The core of Krak des Chevaliers is located in a narrow gully carved from sheer rock walls severely limiting possibilities for a flank attack.

The theory of linear castles arrived in Britain in the mid thirteenth century, so the concept co-existed with concentric castles. The earliest recognised linear castle in Britain is at Tintagel, having a series of defensive wards in a row. Conwy and Caernarfon Castles were both built in a linear style, defending a peninsula.

== See also ==
- Concentric castle
