= List of standardised Welsh place-names in Pembrokeshire =

Location of Pembrokeshire in Wales.

The list of standardised Welsh place-names, for places in Pembrokeshire, is a list compiled by the Welsh Language Commissioner to recommend the standardisation of the spelling of Welsh place-names, particularly in the Welsh language and when multiple forms are used, although some place-names in English were also recommended to be matched with the Welsh. The list contains 323 entries, as of November 2023.

The list is based on recommendations provided by the Place-names Standardisation Panel, convened by the commissioner, for expert advice on the standardisation of Welsh place-names. The panel bases their decisions on a set of guidelines (currently dating to June 2023), specific to Welsh settlement names (such as those of villages, towns, and cities) and topographic features (such as lakes, mountains and rivers). The panel does not cover house or building names, although similar principles could be applied to them or to names for new developments (for which the commissioner offers their own advice to local authorities and housing developers). The panel may also have used additional guidelines.

The list was first published in 2018, and took years to put together. Upon creation, these lists were published under the Open Government Licence 3.0.

In 2018, some of the recommendations in this list attracted local criticism.

== List ==
Recommended standardised names		Other name/spelling not recommended	Type	Grid reference
Welsh	English	Other name/spelling not recommended	Type	Grid reference
Aber-bach	Little Haven		Settlement	SM8512
Abercastell	Abercastell	Abercastle	Settlement	SM8533
Aber-cuch	Aber-cuch	Abercych	Settlement	SN2440
Aberdaugleddau	Milford Haven		Settlement	SM9005
Abereiddi	Abereiddi	Abereiddy	Settlement	SM7931
Abergwaun	Fishguard		Settlement	SM9537
Aberllydan	Broad Haven		Settlement	SM8613
Albert Town	Albert Town		Settlement	SM9415
Amroth	Amroth		Settlement	SN1607
Angle	Angle		Settlement	SM8602
Arberth	Narberth		Settlement	SN1014
Begeli	Begelly		Settlement	SN1107
Bengal	Bengal		Settlement	SM9532
Bentlass	Bentlass		Settlement	SM9601
Bethesda	Bethesda		Settlement	SN0917
Blaen-ffos	Blaen-ffos	Blaenffos	Settlement	SN1937
Boncath	Boncath		Settlement	SN2038
Bosherston	Bosherston		Settlement	SR9694
Boulston	Boulston		Settlement	SM9712
Breudeth	Brawdy		Settlement	SM8523
Bridell	Bridell		Settlement	SN1742
Broadmoor	Broadmoor		Settlement	SN0905
Broadway	Broadway		Settlement	SM8713
Brynberian	Brynberian		Settlement	SN1035
Brynhenllan	Brynhenllan		Settlement	SN0039
Burton	Burton		Settlement	SM9805
Burton Ferry	Burton Ferry		Settlement	SM9805
Bwlch-y-groes	Bwlch-y-groes	Bwlchygroes	Settlement	SN2336
Caerfarchell	Caerfarchell		Settlement	SM7926
Caeriw	Carew		Settlement	SN0403
Camp Hill	Camp Hill		Settlement	SN1113
Camros	Camros	Camrose	Settlement	SM9220
Capel Newydd	Newchapel		Settlement	SN2239
Carew Cheriton	Carew Cheriton		Settlement	SN0402
Carew Newton	Carew Newton		Settlement	SN0404
Carnhedryn	Carnhedryn		Settlement	SM7927
Carreg-wen	Carreg-wen		Settlement	SN2241
Cas-fuwch	Castlebythe		Settlement	SN0228
Cas-lai	Hayscastle		Settlement	SM8925
Cas-mael	Puncheston		Settlement	SN0029
Casmorys	Castle Morris	Castlemorris	Settlement	SM9031
Casnewydd-bach	Little Newcastle		Settlement	SM9728
Castelldwyran	Castelldwyran		Area	SN1418
Castellmartin	Castlemartin		Settlement	SR9198
Cas-wis	Wiston		Settlement	SN0218
Cei Lawrenni	Lawrenny Quay		Settlement	SN0106
Cilau	Cilau		Settlement	SM9439
Cilgerran	Cilgerran		Settlement	SN1942
Cilgeti	Kilgetty		Settlement	SN1207
Cilgwyn	Cilgwyn		Settlement	SN0736
Cilrhedyn	Cilrhedyn		Area	SN0034
Cilrhedyn	Cilrhedyn		Settlement	SN2734
Cipin	Cipin		Settlement	SN1347
Clarbeston	Clarbeston		Settlement	SN0421
Clarbeston Road	Clarbeston Road		Settlement	SN0120
Clunderwen	Clunderwen	Clynderwen	Settlement	SN1219
Cold Blow	Cold Blow		Settlement	SN1212
Cold Inn	Cold Inn		Settlement	SN1005
Colston	Colston		Settlement	SM9828
Cosheston	Cosheston		Settlement	SN0003
Creseli	Cresselly		Settlement	SN0606
Croes Cas-lai	Haycastle Cross	Hayscastle Cross	Settlement	SM9125
Croes-goch	Croes-goch		Settlement	SM8230
Cross Hands	Cross Hands		Settlement	SN0712
Crundale	Crundale		Settlement	SM9718
Crymych	Crymych		Settlement	SN1833
Crynwedd	Crinow		Settlement	SN1214
Cuffern	Cuffern		Settlement	SM8921
Cuttybridge	Cuttybridge		Settlement	SM9319
Cwmyreglwys	Cwmyreglwys	Cwm-yr-Eglwys	Settlement	SN0139
Dale	Dale		Settlement	SM8005
Deerland	Deerland		Settlement	SM9810
Dinbych-y-pysgod	Tenby		Settlement	SN1300
Doc Penfro	Pembroke Dock		Settlement	SM9603
Dreenhill	Dreenhill		Settlement	SM9214
Druidston	Druidston		Settlement	SM8616
Dŵr Cwmwdig	Cwmwdig Water		Settlement	SM8030
Dyffryn	Dyffryn		Settlement	SM9437
East Williamston	East Williamston		Settlement	SN0904
Yr Eglwys Lwyd	Ludchurch		Settlement	SN1410
Eglwys Wen	Eglwys Wen	Eglwyswen	Settlement	SN1536
Eglwys Wythwr	Monington		Settlement	SN1343
Eglwyswrw	Eglwyswrw		Settlement	SN1438
Fachelich	Fachelich		Settlement	SM7725
Felindre Farchog	Felindre Farchog		Settlement	SN1039
Felinganol	Middle Mill		Settlement	SM8025
Ffynnon-groes	Crosswell		Settlement	SN1236
Freshwater East	Freshwater East		Settlement	SS0198
Freystrop	Freystrop		Settlement	SM9511
Y Garn	Roch		Settlement	SM8721
Gelli	Gelli		Settlement	SN0819
Gignog	Gignog		Settlement	SM8824
Glandŵr	Glandŵr		Settlement	SM9825
Glandŵr	Glandŵr		Settlement	SN1928
Glanpwllafon	Glanpwllafon		Settlement	SN1743
Glan-rhyd	Glan-rhyd	Glanrhyd	Settlement	SN1442
Glenowen	Glenowen		Settlement	SM9505
Y Glog	Y Glog		Area	SN2132
Great Honeyborough	Great Honeyborough		Settlement	SM9605
Guilford	Guilford		Settlement	SM9909
Gumfreston	Gumfreston		Settlement	SN1001
Gwastad	Gwastad		Settlement	SN0424
Hakin	Hakin		Settlement	SM8905
Haysford	Haysford		Settlement	SM9221
Hazelbeach	Hazelbeach		Settlement	SM9404
Henfeddau	Henfeddau		Area	SN2431
Herbrandston	Herbrandston		Settlement	SM8607
Hermon	Hermon		Settlement	SN2031
Hillblock	Hillblock		Settlement	SN0015
Hodgeston	Hodgeston		Settlement	SS0399
Hook	Hook		Settlement	SM9711
Houghton	Houghton		Settlement	SM9807
Hubberston	Hubberston		Settlement	SM8906
Hundleton	Hundleton		Settlement	SM9600
Hwlffordd	Haverfordwest		Settlement	SM9515
Jameston	Jameston		Settlement	SS0598
Jeffreyston	Jeffreyston		Settlement	SN0806
Johnston	Johnston		Settlement	SM9310
Lambston	Lambston		Settlement	SM9016
Landshipping	Landshipping		Settlement	SN0111
Lanesend	Lanesend		Settlement	SN0706
Lawrenni	Lawrenny		Settlement	SN0107
Leonardston	Leonardston		Settlement	SM9405
Leweston	Leweston		Settlement	SM9422
Liddeston	Liddeston		Settlement	SM8906
Little Honeyborough	Little Honeyborough		Settlement	SM9506
Little Milford	Little Milford		Settlement	SM9611
Llanbedr Felffre	Lampeter Velfrey		Settlement	SN1514
Llanddewi Felffre	Llanddewi Velfrey		Settlement	SN1416
Llandeilo	Llandeilo		Settlement	SN0929
Llandridian	Llandridian		Settlement	SM7824
Llandudoch	St Dogmaels		Settlement	SN1645
Llandyfái	Lamphey		Settlement	SN0100
Llandysilio	Llandysilio	Llandissilio	Settlement	SN1221
Llanfair Nant-gwyn	Llanfair Nant-gwyn	Llanfair-Nant-Gwyn	Settlement	SN1637
Llanfihangel Penbedw	Llanfihangel Penbedw		Settlement	SN2039
Llanfyrnach	Llanfyrnach		Settlement	SN2231
Llangloffan	Llangloffan		Settlement	SM9032
Llangolman	Llangolman		Settlement	SN1126
Llangwm	Llangwm		Settlement	SM9909
Llanhuadain	Llawhaden		Settlement	SN0617
Llanhywel	Llanhywel	Llanhowell	Settlement	SM8127
Llanion	Llanion		Settlement	SM9703
Llanisan-yn-Rhos	St Ishmaels		Settlement	SM8307
Llanllawer	Llanllawer		Settlement	SM9836
Llan-lwy	Llandeloy		Settlement	SM8526
Llanmill	Llanmill		Settlement	SN1414
Llanreath	Llanreath		Settlement	SM9503
Llanrhian	Llanrhian		Settlement	SM8131
Llanstadwel	Llanstadwel	Llanstadwell	Settlement	SM9405
Llanwnda	Llanwnda		Settlement	SM9339
Llan-y-cefn	Llan-y-cefn	Llanycefn	Settlement	SN0923
Llanychâr	Llanychâr	Llanychaer	Settlement	SM9835
Llwyncelyn	Llwyncelyn		Settlement	SN2042
Llwyn-drain	Llwyn-drain		Settlement	SN2634
Llwynhelyg	Withybush		Settlement	SM9617
Llwyn-yr-hwrdd	Llwyn-yr-hwrdd		Area	SN2232
Llys-y-frân	Llys-y-frân	Llys y Fran	Settlement	SN0424
Loveston	Loveston		Settlement	SN0808
Lower Freystrop	Lower Freystrop		Settlement	SM9512
Lydstep	Lydstep		Settlement	SS0898
Maddox Moor	Maddox Moor		Settlement	SM9611
Maenclochog	Maenclochog		Settlement	SN0827
Maenorbŷr	Manorbier		Settlement	SS0697
Maiden Wells	Maiden Wells		Settlement	SR9799
Manorbier Newton	Manorbier Newton		Settlement	SS0499
Manorowen	Manorowen		Settlement	SM9336
Marloes	Marloes		Settlement	SM7908
Martletwy	Martletwy		Settlement	SN0310
Mascle Bridge	Mascle Bridge			SM9505
Mathri	Mathri		Settlement	SM8731
Melinau	Melinau		Settlement	SN1613
Merlins Cross	Merlins Cross		Settlement	SM9900
Mesur-y-dorth	Mesur-y-dorth		Settlement	SM8330
Millin Cross	Millin Cross		Settlement	SM9913
Monkton	Monkton		Settlement	SM9701
Y Mot	New Moat		Settlement	SN0625
Musselwick	Musselwick		Settlement	SM8106
Mynachlog-ddu	Mynachlog-ddu		Settlement	SN1430
Mynwar	Mynwear	Minwear	Settlement	SN0313
Nanhyfer	Nevern		Settlement	SN0839
New Hedges	New Hedges		Settlement	SN1302
Neyland	Neyland		Settlement	SM9605
Niwgwl	Newgale		Settlement	SM8422
Nolton	Nolton		Settlement	SM8618
Parrog	Parrog		Settlement	SN0439
Pelcomb	Pelcomb		Settlement	SM9218
Pelcomb Bridge	Pelcomb Bridge		Settlement	SM9317
Pelcomb Cross	Pelcomb Cross		Settlement	SM9117
Penalun	Penally		Settlement	SS1199
Pen-ffordd	Pen-ffordd	Penffordd	Settlement	SN0722
Penfro	Pembroke		Settlement	SM9801
Penlanmabws	Penlanmabws		Settlement	SM8829
Pennar	Pennar		Settlement	SM9502
Pennar Park	Pennar Park		Settlement	SM9402
Penrhyn Castle	Penrhyn Castle		Settlement	SN1449
Pentlepoir	Pentlepoir		Settlement	SN1105
Pentregalar	Pentregalar	Pentre Galar	Settlement	SN1731
Pentrisil	Pentrisil		Settlement	SN0634
Pen-y-cwm	Pen-y-cwm	Penycwm	Settlement	SM8523
Penyfeidr	Penyfeidr		Settlement	SM8726
Pen-y-groes	Pen-y-groes	Penygroes	Settlement	SN1535
Penyraber	Penyraber		Settlement	SM9537
Pill	Pill		Area	SM9105
Pisgah	Pisgah		Settlement	SN0406
Plain Dealings	Plain Dealings		Settlement	SN0518
Pleasant Valley	Pleasant Valley		Settlement	SN1406
Pont Arberth	Narberth Bridge		Settlement	SN1014
Pontfadlen	Merlins Bridge	Merlin's Bridge	Settlement	SM9414
Pont-faen	Pont-faen	Pontfaen	Settlement	SN0234
Pontiago	Pontiago		Settlement	SM9238
Pont-rhyd-y-ceirt	Pont-rhyd-y-ceirt		Settlement	SN2142
Pontyglasier	Pontyglasier		Settlement	SN1436
Pontyrhafod	Pontyrhafod		Settlement	SM9026
Port Lion	Port Lion		Settlement	SM9808
Portfield Gate	Portfield Gate		Area	SM9215
Portheiddi	Portheiddi	Portheiddy	Settlement	SM8031
Porth-gain	Porth-gain	Porthgain	Settlement	SM8132
Poyston	Poyston		Settlement	SM9619
Poyston Cross	Poyston Cross		Settlement	SM9719
Prendergast	Prendergast		Settlement	SM8024
Prendergast	Prendergast		Settlement	SM9516
Princes Gate	Princes Gate		Settlement	SN1312
Priory	Priory		Area	SM9007
Pwllcrochan	Pwllcrochan		Settlement	SM9202
Redberth	Redberth		Settlement	SN0804
Reynalton	Reynalton		Settlement	SN0908
Rhoscrowdder	Rhoscrowdder		Settlement	SM9002
Rhos-fach	Rhos-fach		Settlement	SN1128
Rhos-hyl	Rhos-hyl	Rhoshill	Settlement	SN1940
Rhosycaerau	Rhosycaerau		Settlement	SM9137
Rhyd-y-Brown	Rhyd-y-Brown		Settlement	SN0621
Rhydygele	Rhydygele		Settlement	SM8524
Robeston Back	Robeston Back		Settlement	SN0715
Robeston Wathen	Robeston Wathen		Settlement	SN0815
Robeston West	Robeston West		Settlement	SM8809
Roch Gate	Roch Gate		Settlement	SM8720
Rose Valley	Rose Valley		Settlement	SN0000
Rosebush	Rosebush		Settlement	SN0729
Rosemarket	Rosemarket		Settlement	SM9508
Rudbaxton	Rudbaxton		Settlement	SM9620
Sageston	Sageston		Settlement	SN0503
Sandy Haven	Sandy Haven		Settlement	SM8507
Sardis	Sardis		Settlement	SN1306
Saundersfoot	Saundersfoot		Settlement	SN1304
Scleddau	Scleddau		Settlement	SM9434
Y Sgwâr	Square and Compass		Settlement	SM8531
Shipping	Shipping		Settlement	SN1108
Simpson	Simpson		Settlement	SM8818
Simpson Cross	Simpson Cross		Settlement	SM8919
Skerryford	Skerryford		Settlement	SM9214
Skokholm	Skokholm		Island	SM7305
Skomer	Skomer		Island	SM7209
Slade	Slade		Settlement	SM9416
Slebets	Slebech		Settlement	SN0215
Solfach	Solva		Settlement	SM8024
Solfach Isaf	Lower Solva		Settlement	SM8024
Solfach Uchaf	Upper Solva		Settlement	SM7924
Spittal	Spittal		Settlement	SM9723
St Florence	St Florence		Settlement	SN0801
Star	Star		Settlement	SN2434
Stepaside	Stepaside		Settlement	SN1307
Steynton	Steynton		Settlement	SM9107
Stop-and-Call	Stop-and-Call		Settlement	SM9338
Summerhill	Summerhill		Settlement	SN1507
Sutton	Sutton		Settlement	SM9115
Tafarn-sbeit	Tafarn-sbeit	Tavernspite	Settlement	SN1812
Tafarn-y-bwlch	Tafarn-y-bwlch		Settlement	SN0833
Talbenny	Talbenny		Settlement	SM8311
Tangiers	Tangiers		Settlement	SM9518
Tegryn	Tegryn		Settlement	SN2233
Thomas Chapel	Thomas Chapel		Settlement	SN1008
Thornton	Thornton		Settlement	SM9007
Tiers Cross	Tiers Cross		Settlement	SM9010
Treamlod	Ambleston		Settlement	SN0025
Trecŵn	Trecŵn	Trecwn	Settlement	SM9732
Trecŵn	Trecŵn		Settlement	SN1448
Tredemel	Templeton		Settlement	SN1111
Trefaser	Trefaser	Trefasser	Settlement	SM8937
Trefdraeth	Newport		Settlement	SN0539
Trefelen	Bletherston		Settlement	SN0621
Treffynnon	Treffynnon		Settlement	SM8428
Trefgarn	Trefgarn	Treffgarne	Settlement	SM9523
Trefgarnowen	Trefgarnowen		Settlement	SM8625
Tre-fin	Tre-fin	Trefin	Settlement	SM8332
Trefwrdan	Jordanston		Settlement	SM9132
Tregetin	Keeston		Settlement	SM9019
Treginis	Treginis		Area	SM7224
Treglemais	Treglemais		Settlement	SM8128
Tre-groes	Whitchurch		Settlement	SM8025
Tregyddulan	Tregyddulan		Settlement	SM8936
Treleddyd-fawr	Treleddyd-fawr		Settlement	SM7527
Trelerw	Trelerw		Settlement	SM7724
Treletert	Letterston		Settlement	SM9329
Tremarchog	St Nicholas		Settlement	SM9035
Treopert	Granston		Settlement	SM8934
Treteio	Treteio		Settlement	SM7828
Trewyddel	Moylgrove		Settlement	SN1144
Triffleton	Triffleton		Settlement	SM9724
Trooper's Inn	Trooper's Inn		Settlement	SM9610
Tufton	Tufton		Settlement	SN0428
Tyddewi	St Davids		Settlement	SM7525
Upper Nash	Upper Nash		Settlement	SN0202
Uzmaston	Uzmaston		Settlement	SM9714
The Valley	The Valley		Settlement	SN1205
Wallis	Wallis		Settlement	SN0125
Waltwn, Dwyrain	Walton, East	Walton East	Settlement	SN0223
Waltwn, Gorllewin	Walton, West		Settlement	SM8612
Warren	Warren		Settlement	SR9397
Waterston	Waterston		Settlement	SM9305
Wdig	Goodwick		Settlement	SM9438
Welsh Hook	Welsh Hook		Settlement	SM9327
West Denant	West Denant		Settlement	SM9013
West Williamston	West Williamston		Settlement	SN0305
Wolfsdale	Wolfsdale		Settlement	SM9321
Wood	Wood		Settlement	SM8521
Wooden	Wooden		Settlement	SN1105
Yerbeston	Yerbeston		Settlement	SN0609
Ynys Bŷr	Caldey		Island	SS1396
Ynys Deullyn	Ynys Deullyn		Island	SM8434
Ynys Dewi	Ramsey		Island	SM6923
Ysgeifiog	Ysgeifiog		Settlement	SM8027
Ystagbwll	Stackpole		Settlement	SR9896
