= List of standardised Welsh place-names in Monmouthshire =

Location of Monmouthshire in Wales.

The list of standardised Welsh place-names, for places in Monmouthshire, is a list compiled by the Welsh Language Commissioner to recommend the standardisation of the spelling of Welsh place-names, particularly in the Welsh language and when multiple forms are used, although some place-names in English were also recommended to be matched with the Welsh. The list contains 238 entries, as of November 2023.

The list is based on recommendations provided by the Place-names Standardisation Panel, convened by the Commissioner, for expert advice on the standardisation of Welsh place-names. The panel bases their decisions on a set of guidelines (currently dating to June 2023), specific to Welsh settlement names (such as those of villages, towns, and cities) and topographic features (such as lakes, mountains and rivers). The panel does not cover house or building names, although similar principles could be applied to them or to names for new developments (for which the Commissioner offers their own advice to local authorities and housing developers). The panel may also have used additional guidelines.

The list was first published in 2018, and took years to put together. Upon creation, these lists were published under the Open Government Licence 3.0.

== List ==
| Recommended standardised names | | Other name/spelling not recommended | Type | Grid reference |
| Welsh | English | Other name/spelling not recommended | Type | Grid reference |
|---|---|---|---|---|
| Aber-ffrwd | Aber-ffrwd | Aberffrwd | Area | SO3509 |
| Abergwenffrwd | Whitebrook | | Settlement | SO5306 |
| Ballan | Ballan | | Area | ST4889 |
| Barbadoes Green | Barbadoes Green | | Area | SO5201 |
| Beili-glas | Beili-glas | | Settlement | SO3010 |
| Betws | Betws | | Settlement | SO2919 |
| Betws Newydd | Betws Newydd | Bettws Newydd | Settlement | SO3605 |
| Blackrock | Blackrock | | Settlement | ST5188 |
| Bont | Bont | | Settlement | SO3819 |
| Botany Bay | Botany Bay | | Settlement | SO5102 |
| Broadstone | Broadstone | | Settlement | SO5003 |
| Bryn | Bryn | | Settlement | SO3309 |
| Brynbuga | Usk | | Settlement | SO3700 |
| Bryngwenin | Bryngwenin | | Settlement | SO3316 |
| Bryngwyn | Bryngwyn | | Settlement | SO3909 |
| Buckholt | Buckholt | | Settlement | SO5016 |
| Bullyhole Bottom | Bullyhole Bottom | | Settlement | ST4696 |
| Bulwark | Bulwark | | Settlement | ST5392 |
| Caer-went | Caer-went | Caerwent | Settlement | ST4690 |
| Caggle Street | Caggle Street | | Settlement | SO3617 |
| Cantref | Cantref | | Area | SO2814 |
| Capel-y-ffin | Capel-y-ffin | | Settlement | SO2631 |
| Carrow Hill | Carrow Hill | | Settlement | ST4390 |
| Cas-gwent | Chepstow | | Settlement | ST5393 |
| Castellnewydd | Newcastle | | Settlement | SO4417 |
| Catbrook | Catbrook | | Settlement | SO5002 |
| Cemais Comawndwr | Kemeys Commander | | Settlement | SO3404 |
| Cheltenham | Cheltenham | | Settlement | SO2212 |
| Chippenham | Chippenham | | Area | SO5012 |
| Cicelyford | Cicelyford | | Settlement | SO5003 |
| Cilgwrrwg | Cilgwrrwg | | Settlement | ST4798 |
| Cil-y-coed | Caldicot | | Settlement | ST4788 |
| Cleddon | Cleddon | | Settlement | SO5003 |
| Cleidda | Clytha | | Settlement | SO3609 |
| Clydach | Clydach | | Settlement | SO2213 |
| Cobblers Plain | Cobblers Plain | | Settlement | SO4700 |
| Coed Gwent | Wentwood | | Topographical feature | ST4394 |
| Coedcwnwr | Coedcwnwr | | Settlement | ST4099 |
| Coedmorgan | Coedmorgan | Coed Morgan | Settlement | SO3511 |
| Coedyfedw | Coedyfedw | | Settlement | SO4408 |
| Coed-y-paen | Coed-y-paen | | Settlement | ST3398 |
| Coed-yr-iarll | Earlswood | | Area | ST4495 |
| Coldharbour | Coldharbour | | Area | SO3904 |
| Comin Cefn-llwyn | Comin Cefn-llwyn | | Settlement | ST3394 |
| Comin Llanddinol | Itton Common | | Settlement | ST4896 |
| Comin Llanfihangel Troddi | Mitchel Troy Common | | Settlement | SO4910 |
| Common-y-coed | Common-y-coed | | Area | ST4389 |
| The Cot | The Cot | | Settlement | ST5099 |
| Cotland | Cotland | | Settlement | SO5004 |
| Craig-y-dorth | Craig-y-dorth | | Settlement | SO4808 |
| Creigau | Creigau | | Settlement | ST4899 |
| Croes Llanfair | Croes Llanfair | | Settlement | SO3307 |
| Croes-hywel | Croes-hywel | | Settlement | SO3314 |
| Croesyceiliog | Croesyceiliog | | Settlement | ST3196 |
| Croes-y-pant | Croes-y-pant | | Settlement | SO3104 |
| Cross Ash | Cross Ash | | Settlement | SO4019 |
| Crossway | Crossway | | Settlement | SO4419 |
| Crossway Green | Crossway Green | | Settlement | ST5294 |
| Crossways | Crossways | | Settlement | SO3220 |
| Crug | Crick | | Settlement | ST4890 |
| Crumblands | Crumblands | | Settlement | SO4702 |
| Cuckoos Row | Cuckoos Row | | Settlement | SO4208 |
| Cupids Hill | Cupids Hill | | Settlement | SO4025 |
| The Cwm | The Cwm | | Settlement | ST4592 |
| Cwmcarfan | Cwmcarfan | Cwmcarvan | Settlement | SO4707 |
| Cwm-iou | Cwmyoy | | Settlement | SO2923 |
| Cymin | Cymin | | Settlement | SO5212 |
| Cyncoed | Cyncoed | | Settlement | SO4305 |
| Darrenfelen | Darrenfelen | | Settlement | SO2112 |
| Deepweir | Deepweir | | Settlement | ST4887 |
| Devauden | Devauden | | Settlement | ST4898 |
| Drenewydd Gelli-farch | Shirenewton | | Settlement | ST4793 |
| Yr Eglwys Newydd ar y Cefn | Newchurch | | Settlement | ST4597 |
| Y Fenni | Abergavenny | | Settlement | SO2914 |
| Fforest Coalpit | Fforest Coalpit | | Settlement | SO2820 |
| Five Lanes | Five Lanes | | Settlement | ST4490 |
| Gaer-fawr | Gaer-fawr | | Settlement | ST4498 |
| Gaer-lwyd | Gaer-lwyd | Gaerllwyd | Settlement | ST4496 |
| Gilwern | Gilwern | | Settlement | SO2515 |
| Glasgoed | Glasgoed | Glascoed | Area | SO3301 |
| Goetre | Goetre | Goytre | Settlement | SO3206 |
| Gofilon | Gofilon | Govilon | Settlement | SO2613 |
| Great Oak | Great Oak | | Settlement | SO3809 |
| Groes-lwyd | Groes-lwyd | | Settlement | SO3222 |
| Grofield | Grofield | | Settlement | SO2914 |
| Y Grysmwnt | Grosmont | | Settlement | SO4024 |
| Gwehelog | Gwehelog | | Settlement | SO3804 |
| Gwenffrwd | Whitebrook | | Settlement | SO5206 |
| Gwernesni | Gwernesni | Gwernesney | Settlement | SO4101 |
| Gwndy | Undy | | Settlement | ST4386 |
| Hardwick | Hardwick | | Settlement | ST5393 |
| Hendre | Hendre | The Hendre | Settlement | SO4514 |
| Henllan | Henllan | | Area | SO2925 |
| Highmoor Hill | Highmoor Hill | | Settlement | ST4689 |
| Hoop | Hoop | | Settlement | SO5107 |
| Hywig | Howick | | Settlement | ST5095 |
| Jingle Street | Jingle Street | | Settlement | SO4710 |
| Knollbury | Knollbury | | Settlement | ST4388 |
| Leechpool | Leechpool | | Settlement | ST5089 |
| Little Mill | Little Mill | | Settlement | SO3202 |
| Llam-march | Llam-march | | Settlement | SO2211 |
| Llanarfan | St Arvans | | Settlement | ST5196 |
| Llan-arth | Llan-arth | Llanarth | Settlement | SO3710 |
| Llanbadog | Llanbadog | Llanbadoc | Settlement | SO3700 |
| Llancaeo | Llancaeo | Llancayo | Settlement | SO3603 |
| Llanddewi Fach | Llanddewi Fach | | Man-made feature | ST3395 |
| Llanddewi Nant Hodni | Llanthony | | Settlement | SO2827 |
| Llanddewi Rhydderch | Llanddewi Rhydderch | | Settlement | SO3413 |
| Llanddewi Ysgyryd | Llanddewi Skirrid | | Settlement | SO3417 |
| Llanddingad | Dingestow | | Settlement | SO4510 |
| Llanddinol | Itton | | Settlement | ST4995 |
| Llandegfedd | Llandegfedd | Llandegveth | Settlement | ST3395 |
| Llandeilo Bertholau | Llantilio Pertholey | | Settlement | SO3116 |
| Llandeilo Gresynni | Llantilio Crossenny | | Settlement | SO3914 |
| Llandenni | Llandenni | Llandenny | Settlement | SO4103 |
| Llandenni Walks | Llandenni Walks | | Settlement | SO3904 |
| Llandevenny | Llandevenny | | Settlement | ST4186 |
| Llandogo | Llandogo | | Settlement | SO5204 |
| Llanelen | Llanelen | Llanellen | Settlement | SO3010 |
| Llanelli | Llanelli | Llanelly | Settlement | SO2314 |
| Llanelli Hill | Llanelli Hill | Llanelly Hill | Settlement | SO2211 |
| Llanfable | Llanvapley | | Settlement | SO3614 |
| Llanfaenor | Llanfaenor | | Settlement | SO4316 |
| Llanfair Cilgedin | Llanfair Kilgeddin | | Settlement | SO3407 |
| Llanfair Disgoed | Llanfair Disgoed | Llanvair Discoed | Settlement | ST4492 |
| Llan-ffwyst | Llanfoist | | Settlement | SO2813 |
| Llanfihangel Crucornau | Llanfihangel Crucornau | Llanvihangel Crucorney | Settlement | SO3220 |
| Llanfihangel Gobion | Llanfihangel Gobion | Llanvihangel Gobion | Settlement | SO3409 |
| Llanfihangel Rogiet | Llanfihangel Rogiet | | Settlement | ST4587 |
| Llanfihangel Torymynydd | Llanfihangel Torymynydd | Llanfihangel Tor-y-Mynydd | Settlement | SO4601 |
| Llanfihangel Troddi | Mitchel Troy | | Settlement | SO4910 |
| Llanfihangel Ystum Llewern | Llanfihangel Ystum Llewern | Llanvihangel-Ystern-Llewern | Settlement | SO4313 |
| Llanfocha | St Maughans | | Settlement | SO4617 |
| Llangatwg Dyffryn Wysg | Llangattock nigh Usk | Llangattock Nigh Usk The Bryn | Settlement | SO3310 |
| Llangatwg Feibion Afel | Llangatwg Feibion Afel | Llangattock-Vibon-Avel | Settlement | SO4515 |
| Llangatwg Lingoed | Llangatwg Lingoed | | Settlement | SO3620 |
| Llangiwa | Llangiwa | | Settlement | SO3925 |
| Llangofan | Llangofan | Llangovan | Settlement | SO4505 |
| Llan-gwm | Llan-gwm | Llangwm | Settlement | ST4200 |
| Llangybi | Llangybi | | Settlement | ST3796 |
| Llanhenwg | Llanhenwg | | Settlement | ST3592 |
| Llanisien | Llanisien | Llanishen | Settlement | SO4703 |
| Llanllywel | Llanllywel | Llanllowell | Settlement | ST3998 |
| Llanofer | Llanofer | Llanover | Settlement | SO3108 |
| Llanofer Uchaf | Upper Llanofer | | Area | SO2907 |
| Llan-soe | Llan-soe | Llansoy | Settlement | SO4402 |
| Llanteems | Llanteems | | Settlement | SO3320 |
| Llantrisant | Llantrisant | | Settlement | ST3996 |
| Llanwarw | Wonastow | | Settlement | SO4810 |
| Llanwenarth | Llanwenarth | | Settlement | SO2714 |
| Llanwynell | Wolvesnewton | | Settlement | ST4599 |
| Llanwytherin | Llanvetherine | | Settlement | SO3617 |
| Llwyncelyn | Llwyncelyn | | Settlement | ST3594 |
| Llwyn-du | Llwyn-du | | Settlement | SO2815 |
| Lydart | Lydart | | Settlement | SO5009 |
| Maerdy | Maerdy | | Settlement | SO3015 |
| Maesygwartha | Maesygwartha | | Settlement | SO2314 |
| Magwyr | Magor | | Settlement | ST4287 |
| Mamheilad | Mamheilad | Mamhilad | Settlement | SO3003 |
| Maryland | Maryland | | Settlement | SO5105 |
| Mathern | Mathern | | Settlement | ST5291 |
| May Hill | May Hill | | Area | SO5112 |
| Maypole | Maypole | | Settlement | SO4716 |
| Monmouth Cap | Monmouth Cap | | Settlement | SO3926 |
| Mount Ballan | Mount Ballan | | Settlement | ST4989 |
| Mounton | Mounton | | Settlement | ST5193 |
| Mynydd-bach | Mynydd-bach | | Settlement | ST4894 |
| Nantyderi | Nantyderi | Nant-y-derry | Settlement | SO3306 |
| Narth | Narth | | Settlement | SO5206 |
| New Inn | New Inn | | Settlement | SO4800 |
| Newbridge on Usk | Newbridge on Usk | Newbridge-on-Usk | Settlement | ST3894 |
| Newton Green | Newton Green | | Settlement | ST5191 |
| Norton | Norton | | Settlement | SO4420 |
| Oldcastle | Oldcastle | | Settlement | SO3224 |
| Onnen | Onnen | | Settlement | SO4314 |
| Osbaston | Osbaston | | Settlement | SO5014 |
| Over Monnow | Over Monnow | Overmonnow | Area | SO5012 |
| Pandy | Pandy | | Settlement | SO3322 |
| Pantygelli | Pantygelli | | Settlement | SO3018 |
| Pantygoytre | Pantygoytre | | Area | SO3408 |
| Parkhouse | Parkhouse | | Settlement | SO4902 |
| Pen-allt | Pen-allt | Penallt | Settlement | SO5210 |
| Pengroesoped | Pengroesoped | | Settlement | SO3107 |
| Penpedairheol | Penpedairheol | | Settlement | SO3303 |
| Penpergwm | Penpergwm | | Area | SO3210 |
| Penperllenni | Penperllenni | Penperlleni | Settlement | SO3204 |
| Pen-rhos | Pen-rhos | Penrhos | Settlement | SO4111 |
| Pentopyn | Pentopyn | | Area | ST3393 |
| Pentre-waun | Pentre-waun | | Settlement | ST3399 |
| Pen-twyn | Pen-twyn | Pentwyn | Settlement | SO5209 |
| Pen-y-bont | Pen-y-bont | | Settlement | SO2414 |
| Pen-y-cae-mawr | Pen-y-cae-mawr | | Settlement | ST4195 |
| Pen-y-clawdd | Pen-y-clawdd | | Area | SO4507 |
| Pen-y-fan | Pen-y-fan | | Settlement | SO5305 |
| Pen-y-pound | Pen-y-pound | Pen-y-Pound | Area | SO2914 |
| Penyrheol | Penyrheol | | Settlement | SO4311 |
| Pit | Pit | | Settlement | SO3709 |
| Porthsgiwed | Portskewett | | Settlement | ST4988 |
| Presgoed | Presgoed | Prescoed | Settlement | ST3499 |
| Pwll-du | Pwll-du | Pwll Du | Settlement | SO2411 |
| Pwllmeurig | Pwllmeurig | Pwllmeyric | Settlement | ST5192 |
| Radur | Rhadyr | | Settlement | SO3602 |
| Rhaglan | Rhaglan | Raglan | Settlement | SO4107 |
| Rhyd-y-meirch | Rhyd-y-meirch | | Settlement | SO3107 |
| Rockfield | Rockfield | | Settlement | SO4814 |
| Rogiet | Rogiet | | Settlement | ST4687 |
| Saint-y-brid | St Brides Netherwent | | Settlement | ST4389 |
| Slough | Slough | | Settlement | SO4101 |
| Star Hill | Star Hill | | Area | SO4702 |
| Sudbrook | Sudbrook | | Settlement | ST5087 |
| Summerleaze | Summerleaze | | Settlement | ST4285 |
| Ton | Ton | | Settlement | ST3696 |
| Treadam | Treadam | | Area | SO3815 |
| Tredynog | Tredunnock | | Settlement | ST3794 |
| Trefynwy | Monmouth | | Settlement | SO5012 |
| Trellech Grange | Trellech Grange | Trelleck Grange | Settlement | SO4901 |
| Tre'r-gaer | Tre'r-gaer | | Settlement | SO4110 |
| Trewyn | Trewyn | | Settlement | SO3222 |
| Tryleg | Trellech | | Settlement | SO5005 |
| The Tumble | The Tumble | | Area | SO2511 |
| Twyn Wenallt | Twyn Wenallt | | Settlement | SO2413 |
| Twynallws | Twynallws | | Settlement | SO2513 |
| Twynyrargoed | Twynyrargoed | | Settlement | SO4207 |
| Twynysheriff | Twynysheriff | | Settlement | SO4005 |
| Tŷ-fry | Tŷ-fry | | Settlement | ST4397 |
| Tyla | Tyla | | Settlement | SO2413 |
| Tyndyrn | Tintern | | Settlement | SO5300 |
| Upper Redbrook | Upper Redbrook | | Settlement | SO5310 |
| Walson | Walson | | Settlement | SO4320 |
| Waunllapria | Waunllapria | | Settlement | SO2212 |
| Waun-wen | Waun-wen | | Area | SO2211 |
| Wayne Green | Wayne Green | | Settlement | SO4118 |
| Wernrheolydd | Wernrheolydd | | Settlement | SO3912 |
| Wern-y-cwrt | Wern-y-cwrt | | Settlement | SO3908 |
| Whitelye | Whitelye | | Settlement | SO5101 |
| Whitewall Common | Whitewall Common | | Settlement | ST4286 |
| Wyesham | Wyesham | | Settlement | SO5112 |
| Ynysgynwraidd | Skenfrith | | Settlement | SO4520 |
