= List of standardised Welsh place-names in Denbighshire =

Location of Denbighshire in Wales.

The list of standardised Welsh place-names, for places in Denbighshire, is a list compiled by the Welsh Language Commissioner to recommend the standardisation of the spelling of Welsh place-names, particularly in the Welsh language and when multiple forms are used, although some place-names in English were also recommended to be matched with the Welsh. The list contains 82 entries, as of November 2023.

The list is based on recommendations provided by the Place-names Standardisation Panel, convened by the Commissioner, for expert advice on the standardisation of Welsh place-names. The panel bases their decisions on a set of guidelines (currently dating to June 2023), specific to Welsh settlement names (such as those of villages, towns, and cities) and topographic features (such as lakes, mountains and rivers). The panel does not cover house or building names, although similar principles could be applied to them or to names for new developments (for which the Commissioner offers their own advice to local authorities and housing developers). The panel may also have used additional guidelines.

The list was first published in 2018, and took years to put together. Upon creation, these lists were published under the Open Government Licence 3.0.

== List ==
Recommended standardised names		Other name/spelling not recommended	Type	Grid reference
Welsh	English	Other name/spelling not recommended	Type	Grid reference
Aberchwiler	Aberwheeler		Settlement	SJ0969
Alltmelyd	Meliden		Settlement	SJ0680
Berwyn	Berwyn		Settlement	SJ1943
Betws Gwerful Goch	Betws Gwerful Goch	Betws Gwerfil Goch	Settlement	SJ0346
Bodelwyddan	Bodelwyddan		Settlement	SJ0075
Bodfari	Bodfari		Settlement	SJ0970
Bontuchel	Bontuchel		Settlement	SJ0857
Bryneglwys	Bryneglwys		Settlement	SJ1447
Bryniau	Bryniau		Settlement	SJ0680
Bryn-newydd	Bryn-newydd		Settlement	SJ1841
Brynsaithmarchog	Brynsaithmarchog	Bryn Saith Marchog	Settlement	SJ0750
Carrog	Carrog		Settlement	SJ1043
Clawddnewydd	Clawddnewydd		Settlement	SJ0852
Clawddponcen	Clawddponcen	Clawdd Poncen	Settlement	SJ0744
Clocaenog	Clocaenog		Settlement	SJ0854
Corwen	Corwen		Settlement	SJ0743
Cwm	Cwm		Settlement	SJ0677
Cynwyd	Cynwyd		Settlement	SJ0541
Derwen	Derwen		Settlement	SJ0650
Dinbych	Denbigh		Settlement	SJ0566
Dyserth	Dyserth		Settlement	SJ0579
Efenechdyd	Efenechdyd	Efenechtyd	Settlement	SJ1155
Eglwyseg	Eglwyseg		Area	SJ2147
Eryrys	Eryrys		Settlement	SJ2057
Fronbache	Fronbache		Settlement	SJ2141
Galltegfa	Galltegfa		Settlement	SJ1057
Gellifor	Gellifor		Settlement	SJ1262
Glasgoed	Glasgoed		Settlement	SH9973
Glyndyfrdwy	Glyndyfrdwy		Settlement	SJ1442
Graianrhyd	Graianrhyd		Settlement	SJ2156
Graigfechan	Graigfechan		Settlement	SJ1454
Green	Green		Settlement	SJ0568
Groesffordd Marli	Groesffordd Marli		Settlement	SJ0073
Gwyddelwern	Gwyddelwern		Settlement	SJ0746
Y Gyffylliog	Y Gyffylliog	Cyffylliog	Settlement	SJ0557
Hendre-rwydd	Hendre-rwydd		Settlement	SJ1263
Henllan	Henllan		Settlement	SJ0268
Lawnt	Lawnt		Settlement	SJ0465
Llanarmon-yn-Iâl	Llanarmon-yn-Iâl		Settlement	SJ1956
Llanbedr Dyffryn Clwyd	Llanbedr Dyffryn Clwyd		Settlement	SJ1459
Llandegla	Llandegla		Settlement	SJ1952
Llandynnan	Llandynnan	Llandynan	Settlement	SJ1844
Llandyrnog	Llandyrnog		Settlement	SJ1065
Llanelidan	Llanelidan		Settlement	SJ1050
Llanelwy	St Asaph		Settlement	SJ0374
Llanfair Dyffryn Clwyd	Llanfair Dyffryn Clwyd		Settlement	SJ1355
Llanferres	Llanferres		Settlement	SJ1860
Llanfwrog	Llanfwrog		Settlement	SJ1157
Llangollen	Llangollen		Settlement	SJ2141
Llangwyfan	Llangwyfan		Settlement	SJ1166
Llangynhafal	Llangynhafal		Settlement	SJ1263
Llanrhaeadr-yng-Nghinmeirch	Llanrhaeadr-yng-Nghinmeirch		Settlement	SJ0863
Llanynys	Llanynys		Settlement	SJ1062
Llidiart Annie	Llidiart Annie		Settlement	SJ1844
Llidiart-y-parc	Llidiart-y-parc		Settlement	SJ1143
Loggerheads	Loggerheads		Settlement	SJ1862
Maes-hafn	Maes-hafn	Maeshafn	Settlement	SJ2060
Marian Cwm	Marian Cwm		Settlement	SJ0777
Melin-y-wig	Melin-y-wig	Melin-y-Wig	Settlement	SJ0348
Nantglyn	Nantglyn		Settlement	SJ0062
Pandy’r Capel	Pandy’r Capel		Settlement	SJ0850
Peniel	Peniel		Settlement	SJ0362
Pentre Llanrhaeadr	Pentre Llanrhaeadr		Settlement	SJ0862
Pentrecelyn	Pentrecelyn		Settlement	SJ1453
Pentredŵr	Pentredŵr	Pentredwr	Settlement	SJ1946
Pentrefelin	Pentrefelin		Settlement	SJ2043
Pontystrad	Pontystrad		Settlement	SJ0564
Prestatyn	Prestatyn		Settlement	SJ0682
Prion	Prion		Area	SJ0562
Pwll-glas	Pwll-glas	Pwllglas	Settlement	SJ1154
Rhewl	Rhewl		Settlement	SJ1060
Rhewl	Rhewl		Settlement	SJ1844
Rhuallt	Rhuallt		Settlement	SJ0775
Rhuddlan	Rhuddlan		Settlement	SJ0278
Rhuthun	Ruthin		Settlement	SJ1258
Rhydymeudwy	Rhydymeudwy		Settlement	SJ1251
Y Rhyl	Rhyl		Settlement	SJ0181
Saron	Saron		Settlement	SJ0260
Trefnant	Trefnant		Settlement	SJ0570
Trefor	Trefor		Settlement	SJ2642
Tremeirchion	Tremeirchion		Settlement	SJ0873
Waun	Waun		Settlement	SJ1065
