= List of standardised Welsh place-names in Neath Port Talbot =

Location of the County Borough of Neath Port Talbot in Wales.

The list of standardised Welsh place-names, for places in Neath Port Talbot, is a list compiled by the Welsh Language Commissioner to recommend the standardisation of the spelling of Welsh place-names, particularly in the Welsh language and when multiple forms are used, although some place-names in English were also recommended to be matched with the Welsh. The list contains 89 entries, as of November 2023.

The list is based on recommendations provided by the Place-names Standardisation Panel, convened by the Commissioner, for expert advice on the standardisation of Welsh place-names. The panel bases their decisions on a set of guidelines (currently dating to June 2023), specific to Welsh settlement names (such as those of villages, towns, and cities) and topographic features (such as lakes, mountains and rivers). The panel does not cover house or building names, although similar principles could be applied to them or to names for new developments (for which the Commissioner offers their own advice to local authorities and housing developers). The panel may also have used additional guidelines.

The list was first published in 2018, and took years to put together. Upon creation, these lists were published under the Open Government Licence 3.0.

== List ==
Recommended standardised names		Other name/spelling not recommended	Type	Grid reference
Welsh	English	Other name/spelling not recommended	Type	Grid reference
Aberafan	Aberafan	Aberavon	Settlement	SS7590
Abercregan	Abercregan		Settlement	SS8596
Aberdulais	Aberdulais		Settlement	SS7799
Abergarwed	Abergarwed		Settlement	SN8102
Abergwynfi	Abergwynfi		Settlement	SS8996
Allt-wen	Allt-wen	Alltwen	Settlement	SN7203
Baglan	Baglan		Settlement	SS7592
Banwen	Banwen		Settlement	SN8509
Blaendulais	Seven Sisters		Settlement	SN8208
Blaen-gwrach	Blaen-gwrach	Blaengwrach	Settlement	SN8605
Blaengwynfi	Blaengwynfi		Settlement	SS8996
Blaenhonddan	Blaenhonddan		Community	SN7500
Brombil	Brombil		Settlement	SS7987
Bryn	Bryn		Settlement	SS8192
Brynaman Isaf	Lower Brynaman	Lower Brynamman	Settlement	SN7013
Brynbryddan	Brynbryddan		Settlement	SS7792
Bryn-coch	Bryn-coch	Bryncoch	Settlement	SS7499
Caerhendy	Caerhendy		Settlement	SS7791
Castell-nedd	Neath		Settlement	SS7597
Cerrigllwydion	Cerrigllwydion		Settlement	SS7894
Cil-ffriw	Cil-ffriw		Settlement	SN7700
Cilmaen-gwyn	Cilmaen-gwyn		Settlement	SN7406
Cilybebyll	Cilybebyll		Settlement	SN7404
Cimla	Cimla		Settlement	SS7696
Clun	Clyne		Settlement	SN8000
Corlannau	Corlannau		Settlement	SS7690
Craig-y-duke	Craig-y-duke		Settlement	SN7002
Croeserw	Croeserw		Settlement	SS8695
Cwmafan	Cwmafan		Settlement	SS7892
Cwm-gors	Cwm-gors	Cwmgors	Settlement	SN7010
Cwm-gwrach	Cwm-gwrach	Cwmgwrach	Settlement	SN8605
Cwmllynfell	Cwmllynfell		Settlement	SN7412
Cwrt-sart	Cwrt-sart		Settlement	SS7495
Cymer	Cymer	Cymmer	Settlement	SS8696
Cynonville	Cynonville		Settlement	SS8295
Dyffryn	Dyffryn		Settlement	SS8395
Dyffryn Cellwen	Dyffryn Cellwen		Settlement	SN8510
Dyffryn Clydach	Dyffryn Clydach		Community	SS7299
Efail-fach	Efail-fach		Settlement	SS7895
Eglwys Nynnid	Eglwys Nynnid		Settlement	SS8084
Felindre	Felindre		Settlement	SS7690
Fforest-goch	Fforest-goch		Settlement	SN7401
Gelli-gron	Gelli-gron		Settlement	SN7104
Gelli-nudd	Gelli-nudd		Settlement	SN7304
Glyncorrwg	Glyncorrwg		Settlement	SS8799
Glyn-nedd	Glynneath		Settlement	SN8706
Godre'r-graig	Godre'r-graig	Godre'r Graig	Settlement	SN7506
Goetre	Goetre	Goytre	Settlement	SS7889
Gwauncaegurwen	Gwauncaegurwen	Gwaun-Cae-Gurwen	Settlement	SN7011
Gwaunleision	Gwaunleision		Settlement	SN7012
Jersey Marine	Jersey Marine		Settlement	SS7194
Llandarcy	Llandarcy		Settlement	SS7195
Llan-giwg	Llan-giwg		Settlement	SN7205
Llansawel	Briton Ferry		Settlement	SS7394
Margam	Margam		Settlement	SS7986
Melincryddan	Melincryddan		Settlement	SS7496
Melin-cwrt	Melin-cwrt		Settlement	SN8101
Morfa-glas	Morfa-glas	Morfa Glas	Settlement	SN8706
Mynachlog Nedd	Neath Abbey		Settlement	SS7398
Nant-y-cafn	Nant-y-cafn		Settlement	SN8107
Onllwyn	Onllwyn		Settlement	SN8410
Pant-du	Pant-du		Settlement	SS7791
Pencaerau	Pencaerau		Settlement	SS7495
Penrhiw-fawr	Penrhiw-fawr		Settlement	SN7410
Penrhiwtyn	Penrhiwtyn		Settlement	SS7495
Pen-y-cae	Pen-y-cae		Settlement	SS7789
Pontardawe	Pontardawe		Settlement	SN7204
Pont-rhyd-y-fen	Pont-rhyd-y-fen	Pontrhydyfen	Settlement	SS7994
Pontwalby	Pontwalby		Settlement	SN8906
Port Talbot	Port Talbot		Settlement	SS7589
Pwll-y-glaw	Pwll-y-glaw		Settlement	SS7993
Resolfen	Resolfen	Resolven	Settlement	SN8202
Rhos	Rhos		Settlement	SN7303
Rhyding	Rhyding		Settlement	SS7498
Rhyd-y-fro	Rhyd-y-fro		Settlement	SN7105
Sandfields	Sandfields		Settlement	SS7490
Sgiwen	Skewen		Settlement	SS7297
Tai-bach	Tai-bach	Taibach	Settlement	SS7789
Tai'r-gwaith	Tai'r-gwaith		Settlement	SN7112
Ton-mawr	Ton-mawr	Tonmawr	Settlement	SS8096
Tonna	Tonna		Settlement	SS7799
Trebanos	Trebanos		Settlement	SN7103
Treforgan	Treforgan		Settlement	SN7906
Tynewydd	Tynewydd		Settlement	SN8209
Ynysmeudwy	Ynysmeudwy		Settlement	SN7305
Ynys-y-gwas	Ynys-y-gwas		Settlement	SS7891
Ynysymaerdy	Ynysymaerdy		Settlement	SS7494
Ynysymwn	Ynysymwn		Settlement	SN7102
Ystalyfera	Ystalyfera		Settlement	SN7608
