= List of standardised Welsh place-names in Wrexham County Borough =

Location of Wrexham County Borough in Wales.

The list of standardised Welsh place-names, for places in Wrexham County Borough, is a list compiled by the Welsh Language Commissioner to recommend the standardisation of the spelling of Welsh place-names, particularly in the Welsh language and when multiple forms are used, although some place-names in English were also recommended to be matched with the Welsh. The list contains 149 entries, as of November 2023.

The list is based on recommendations provided by the Place-names Standardisation Panel, convened by the Commissioner, for expert advice on the standardisation of Welsh place-names. The panel bases their decisions on a set of guidelines (currently dating to June 2023), specific to Welsh settlement names (such as those of villages, towns, and cities) and topographic features (such as lakes, mountains and rivers). The panel does not cover house or building names, although similar principles could be applied to them or to names for new developments (for which the Commissioner offers their own advice to local authorities and housing developers). The panel may also have used additional guidelines.

The list was first published in 2018, and took years to put together. Upon creation, these lists were published under the Open Government Licence 3.0.

== List ==
Recommended standardised names		Other name/spelling not recommended	Type	Grid reference
Welsh	English	Other name/spelling not recommended	Type	Grid reference
Aber-oer	Aber-oer	Aberoer	Settlement	SJ2849
Acre-fair	Acre-fair	Acrefair	Settlement	SJ2743
Afoneitha	Afoneitha		Settlement	SJ2945
Bangor Is-coed	Bangor-on-Dee		Settlement	SJ3945
Bedwell	Bedwell		Settlement	SJ3646
Bedw-lwyn	Bedw-lwyn		Settlement	SJ2236
Bers	Bersham		Settlement	SJ3049
Bettisfield	Bettisfield		Settlement	SJ4635
Big Arowry	Big Arowry	Arowry	Settlement	SJ4539
Borras	Borras		Settlement	SJ3452
Bowling Bank	Bowling Bank		Settlement	SJ3948
Bradle	Bradley		Settlement	SJ3253
Broadoak	Broadoak		Settlement	SJ3658
Bronington	Bronington		Settlement	SJ4839
Bronwylfa	Bronwylfa		Area	SJ2848
Brymbo	Brymbo		Settlement	SJ2953
Bryn Offa	Bryn Offa		Settlement	SJ3249
Bryn Pen-y-lan	Bryn Pen-y-lan		Settlement	SJ3342
Brynhovah	Brynhovah		Settlement	SJ3843
Brynhyfryd	Summerhill		Settlement	SJ3153
Bryn-teg	Bryn-teg	Brynteg	Settlement	SJ3052
Brynyreos	Brynyreos		Settlement	SJ2840
Burton	Burton		Settlement	SJ3557
Bwlch-gwyn	Bwlch-gwyn	Bwlchgwyn	Settlement	SJ2653
Cadney Bank	Cadney Bank		Settlement	SJ4634
Cefnbychan	Cefnbychan		Settlement	SJ2741
Cefn-mawr	Cefn-mawr	Cefn Mawr	Settlement	SJ2842
Cock Bank	Cock Bank		Settlement	SJ3545
Coed-poeth	Coed-poeth	Coedpoeth	Settlement	SJ2851
Commonwood	Commonwood		Settlement	SJ3853
Crabtree Green	Crabtree Green		Settlement	SJ3344
Cross Lanes	Cross Lanes		Settlement	SJ3747
Cumber's Bank	Cumber's Bank		Settlement	SJ4439
Darland	Darland		Settlement	SJ3757
Ddôl	Ddôl		Settlement	SJ3149
Dôl-y-wern	Dôl-y-wern		Settlement	SJ2237
Drury Lane	Drury Lane		Settlement	SJ4642
Eglwys Cross	Eglwys Cross		Settlement	SJ4740
Erbistog	Erbistock		Settlement	SJ3541
Erddig	Erddig		Area	SJ3248
Eutun	Eyton		Settlement	SJ3444
Fenns Bank	Fenns Bank		Settlement	SJ5039
Ffos-y-go	Ffos-y-go		Settlement	SJ3054
Four Crosses	Four Crosses		Settlement	SJ2553
Fron	Fron		Settlement	SJ2952
Fron Isaf	Fron Isaf		Settlement	SJ2740
Froncysyllte	Froncysyllte		Settlement	SJ2741
Fron-deg	Fron-deg		Settlement	SJ2749
Garden Village	Garden Village		Settlement	SJ3352
Garth Trefor	Garth Trefor	Garth Trevor	Settlement	SJ2642
Gegin	Gegin		Settlement	SJ2752
Glasgoed	Glasgoed		Settlement	SJ2754
Glynceiriog	Glynceiriog	Glyn Ceiriog	Settlement	SJ2038
Glyntraean	Glyntraean	Glyntraian	Community	SJ2235
Golly	Golly		Settlement	SJ3358
Gresffordd	Gresford		Settlement	SJ3554
Gwaunyterfyn	Acton		Settlement	SJ3451
Gwersyllt	Gwersyllt		Settlement	SJ3253
Gwynfryn	Gwynfryn		Settlement	SJ2552
Gyfelia	Gyfelia		Settlement	SJ3245
Hafod-y-bwch	Hafod-y-bwch		Area	SJ3147
Halchdyn	Halghton		Settlement	SJ4143
Halton	Halton		Settlement	SJ3039
Hanmer	Hanmer		Settlement	SJ4539
Hightown	Hightown		Settlement	SJ3349
Holly Bush	Holly Bush		Settlement	SJ4044
Holt	Holt		Settlement	SJ4053
Honkley	Honkley		Settlement	SJ3459
Horseman's Green	Horseman's Green		Settlement	SJ4441
Is-y-coed	Is-y-coed	Isycoed	Settlement	SJ4050
Johnstown	Johnstown		Settlement	SJ3046
Knolton	Knolton		Settlement	SJ3738
Knolton Bryn	Knolton Bryn		Settlement	SJ3739
Lavister	Lavister		Settlement	SJ3758
Lightwood Green	Lightwood Green		Settlement	SJ3840
Little Acton	Little Acton		Electoral unit	SJ3452
Little Arowry	Little Arowry		Settlement	SJ4540
Little Green	Little Green		Settlement	SJ4840
Little Overton	Little Overton		Settlement	SJ3741
Llai	Llay		Settlement	SJ3355
Llanarmon Dyffryn Ceiriog	Llanarmon Dyffryn Ceiriog		Settlement	SJ1532
Llannerch Banna	Penley		Settlement	SJ4139
Llan-y-pwll	Llan-y-pwll		Settlement	SJ3751
Llwyneinion	Llwyneinion		Settlement	SJ2847
Llwyn-mawr	Llwyn-mawr	Llwynmawr	Settlement	SJ2237
Llwyn-onn	Llwyn-onn		Settlement	SJ3549
Maes-y-dre	Maes-y-dre		Settlement	SJ3451
Marchwiel	Marchwiel		Settlement	SJ3547
Marford	Marford		Settlement	SJ3656
Merehead	Merehead		Settlement	SJ4538
Moss	Moss		Settlement	SJ3053
Mount Sion	Mount Sion		Settlement	SJ2953
Mwynglawdd	Minera		Settlement	SJ2751
New Brighton	New Brighton		Settlement	SJ2750
New Broughton	New Broughton		Settlement	SJ3151
Newbridge	Newbridge		Settlement	SJ2841
Yr Orsedd	Rossett		Settlement	SJ3657
Owrtyn	Overton	Overton-on-Dee	Settlement	SJ3741
Pandy	Pandy		Settlement	SJ1935
Pandy	Pandy		Settlement	SJ4243
Parciau	Parkey		Settlement	SJ3848
Park Lane	Park Lane		Settlement	SJ4239
Parkside	Parkside		Settlement	SJ3855
Pen-rhos	Pen-rhos		Settlement	SJ2853
Pentre	Pentre		Settlement	SJ2840
Pentre	Pentre		Settlement	SJ3141
Pentre Broughton	Pentre Broughton		Settlement	SJ3052
Pentre Maelor	Pentre Maelor		Settlement	SJ3749
Pen-y-bryn	Pen-y-bryn		Settlement	SJ2644
Pen-y-cae	Pen-y-cae		Settlement	SJ2745
Plas Madog	Plas Madog	Plas Madoc	Settlement	SJ2843
Plas-coch	Plas-coch	Plas Coch	Settlement	SJ3251
Ponciau	Ponciau		Settlement	SJ2946
Pontfadog	Pontfadog		Settlement	SJ2338
Pont-y-blew	Pont-y-blew		Settlement	SJ3138
Redbrook	Redbrook		Settlement	SJ5040
Rhewl	Rhewl		Settlement	SJ3639
Rhiwabon	Ruabon		Settlement	SJ3043
Rhos-ddu	Rhos-ddu	Rhosddu	Settlement	SJ3351
Rhosllannerchrugog	Rhosllannerchrugog	Rhosllanerchrugog	Settlement	SJ2946
Rhosnesni	Rhosnesni		Settlement	SJ3450
Rhosrobin	Rhosrobin		Settlement	SJ3252
Rhostyllen	Rhostyllen		Settlement	SJ3148
Rhosymadoc	Rhosymadoc		Settlement	SJ3142
Rhosymedre	Rhosymedre		Settlement	SJ2842
Rhos-y-waun	Rhos-y-waun		Settlement	SJ2938
Ridleywood	Ridleywood		Settlement	SJ4051
Sandy Lane	Sandy Lane		Settlement	SJ4040
Singret	Singret		Settlement	SJ3455
Sonlli	Sontley		Settlement	SJ3346
Southsea	Southsea		Settlement	SJ3051
Strytlydan	Strytlydan		Settlement	SJ4339
Stryt-yr-hwch	Stryt-yr-hwch		Settlement	SJ3346
Sutton Green	Sutton Green		Settlement	SJ4048
Sydallt	Sydallt		Settlement	SJ3155
Tai-nant	Tai-nant		Settlement	SJ2746
Talwrn	Talwrn		Settlement	SJ2947
Talwrn Green	Tallarn Green		Settlement	SJ4444
Tan-y-fron	Tan-y-fron	Tanyfron	Settlement	SJ2952
Three Fingers	Three Fingers		Settlement	SJ4541
Trefalun	Trefalun	Trevalyn	Settlement	SJ3756
Trefechan	Trefechan		Settlement	SJ2645
Tregeiriog	Tregeiriog		Settlement	SJ1733
Wallington	Wallington		Settlement	SJ4145
Y Waun	Chirk		Settlement	SJ2937
Wern	Wern		Settlement	SJ2750
Whitewell	Whitewell		Settlement	SJ4941
Worthenbury	Worthenbury		Settlement	SJ4246
Wrecsam	Wrexham		Settlement	SJ3350
