= List of standardised Welsh place-names in Blaenau Gwent =

Location of Blaenau Gwent in Wales.

The list of standardised Welsh place-names, for places in Blaenau Gwent, is a list compiled by the Welsh Language Commissioner to recommend the standardisation of the spelling of Welsh place-names, particularly in the Welsh language and when multiple forms are used, although some place-names in English were also recommended to be matched with the Welsh. The list contains 68 entries, as of November 2023.

The list is based on recommendations provided by the Place-names Standardisation Panel, convened by the Commissioner, for expert advice on the standardisation of Welsh place-names. The panel bases their decisions on a set of guidelines (currently dating to June 2023), specific to Welsh settlement names (such as those of villages, towns, and cities) and topographic features (such as lakes, mountains and rivers). The panel does not cover house or building names, although similar principles could be applied to them or to names for new developments (for which the Commissioner offers their own advice to local authorities and housing developers). The panel may also have used additional guidelines.

The list was first published in 2018, and took years to put together. Upon creation, these lists were published under the Open Government Licence 3.0.

== List ==
Recommended standardised names		Other name/spelling not recommended	Type	Grid reference
Welsh	English	Other name/spelling not recommended	Type	Grid reference
Aberbîg	Aberbeeg		Settlement	SO2102
Abertyleri	Abertillery		Settlement	SO2104
Beaufort Hill	Beaufort Hill		Settlement	SO1711
Blackrock	Blackrock		Settlement	SO2112
Blaenau	Blaina		Settlement	SO1908
Blaenau Gwent	Blaenau Gwent		Area	SO2104
Blaen-y-cwm	Mountain Air		Settlement	SO1509
Bourneville	Bourneville		Settlement	SO2006
Brynithel	Brynithel		Settlement	SO2101
Bryn-mawr	Bryn-mawr	Brynmawr	Settlement	SO1911
Cefngolau	Cefngolau	Cefn Golau	Settlement	SO1308
Cendl	Beaufort		Settlement	SO1611
Clydach	Clydach		Settlement	SO2312
Clydach Terrace	Clydach Terrace		Settlement	SO1813
Coedcae	Coedcae		Settlement	SO2009
Cwm	Cwm		Settlement	SO1805
Cwmcelyn	Cwmcelyn		Settlement	SO2008
Cwm-nant-gam	Cwm-nant-gam		Settlement	SO2012
Cwmtyleri	Cwmtillery		Settlement	SO2105
East Bank	East Bank		Settlement	SO2206
Eglwys Newydd	Newchurch		Settlement	SO1610
Garden City	Garden City		Settlement	SO1607
Garn-fach	Garn-fach		Settlement	SO1910
Garnlydan	Garnlydan		Settlement	SO1612
Gellifelen	Gellifelen		Settlement	SO2111
Georgetown	Georgetown		Settlement	SO1408
Gilwern	Gilwern		Settlement	SO2414
Glandŵr	Glandŵr		Settlement	SO2001
Glyn Nant-y-glo	Coalbrookvale		Settlement	SO1909
Glyn-coed	Glyn-coed		Settlement	SO1610
Glynebwy	Ebbw Vale		Settlement	SO1609
Hafod-y-coed	Hafod-y-coed		Area	SO2200
Llandafal	Llandafal	Llan-dafel	Area	SO1803
Llanhiledd	Llanhilleth		Settlement	SO2101
Lower Common	Lower Common		Area	SO2415
Nant-y-bwch	Nant-y-bwch		Area	SO1210
Nant-y-glo	Nant-y-glo	Nantyglo	Settlement	SO1910
Newtown	Newtown		Settlement	SO1710
Pantygerdinen	Ashvale		Settlement	SO1310
Pantypwdyn	Pantypwdyn		Settlement	SO2203
Parc-y-rhiw	Parc-y-rhiw		Settlement	SO2204
Penrhiwgarreg	Penrhiwgarreg		Settlement	SO2204
Pen-y-bont	Pen-y-bont		Settlement	SO2105
Pen-y-bryn	Hilltop		Settlement	SO1609
Pont-y-gof	Pont-y-gof		Settlement	SO1610
Pyllau Bedwellte	Bedwellty Pits		Settlement	SO1506
Rhyd-y-blew	Carmeltown		Settlement	SO1611
Sgwrfa	Sgwrfa		Settlement	SO1410
Sirhywi	Sirhowy		Settlement	SO1410
Six Bells	Six Bells		Settlement	SO2203
Swffryd	Swffryd		Settlement	ST2199
Tafarnau-bach	Tafarnau-bach	Tafarnaubach	Settlement	SO1110
Tallistown	Tallistown		Settlement	SO1804
Tredegar	Tredegar		Settlement	SO1409
Trefil	Trefil		Settlement	SO1212
Troedrhiw’r-clawdd	Victoria		Settlement	SO1707
Troedrhiw-gwair	Troedrhiw-gwair		Settlement	SO1506
Y Twyn	Dukestown		Settlement	SO1310
Twyncynhordy	Twyncynhordy		Settlement	SO1811
Twyndrysïog	Briery Hill		Settlement	SO1608
Tŷ-llwyn	Tŷ-llwyn		Settlement	SO1708
Tynewydd	Tynewydd		Settlement	SO1210
Waun-deg	Waun-deg		Settlement	SO1311
Waun-lwyd	Waun-lwyd	Waun-Lwyd	Settlement	SO1706
West Bank	West Bank		Settlement	SO2105
West Side	West Side		Settlement	SO1907
Willowtown	Willowtown		Settlement	SO1610
Winchestown	Winchestown		Settlement	SO1810
