= List of standardised Welsh place-names in Merthyr Tydfil County Borough =

Location of Merthyr Tydfil County Borough in Wales.

The list of standardised Welsh place-names, for places in Merthyr Tydfil County Borough, is a list compiled by the Welsh Language Commissioner to recommend the standardisation of the spelling of Welsh place-names, particularly in the Welsh language and when multiple forms are used, although some place-names in English were also recommended to be matched with the Welsh. The list contains 52 entries, as of November 2023.

The list is based on recommendations provided by the Place-names Standardisation Panel, convened by the Commissioner, for expert advice on the standardisation of Welsh place-names. The panel bases their decisions on a set of guidelines (currently dating to June 2023), specific to Welsh settlement names (such as those of villages, towns, and cities) and topographic features (such as lakes, mountains and rivers). The panel does not cover house or building names, although similar principles could be applied to them or to names for new developments (for which the Commissioner offers their own advice to local authorities and housing developers). The panel may also have used additional guidelines.

The list was first published in 2018, and took years to put together. Upon creation, these lists were published under the Open Government Licence 3.0.

== List ==
Recommended standardised names		Not recommended names		Type	Grid reference
Welsh	English	Welsh	English	Type	Grid reference
Abercannaid	Abercannaid		Abercanaid	Settlement	SO0503
Aberfan	Aberfan			Settlement	SO0700
Bedlinog	Bedlinog			Settlement	SO0901
Bryniau	Bryniau			Area	SO0508
Cae-draw	Cae-draw			Settlement	SO0405
Caeharris	Caeharris			Area	SO0707
Caeraca	Caeraca			Settlement	SO0609
Cefncoedycymer	Cefncoedycymer	Cefn-coed	Cefn-coed-y-cymmer	Settlement	SO0308
Clwydyfagwyr	Clwydyfagwyr			Settlement	SO0206
Craig-berth-lwyd	Craig-berth-lwyd			Area	ST0996
Y Cwar	The Quar			Settlement	SO0406
Cwmfelin	Cwmfelin			Settlement	SO0900
Cyfarthfa	Cyfarthfa			Area	SO0407
Dowlais	Dowlais			Settlement	SO0608
Dowlais Top	Dowlais Top			Settlement	SO0708
Dyffryn	Dyffryn			Area	SO0603
Edwardsville	Edwardsville			Settlement	ST0896
Faenor	Vaynor			Settlement	SO0410
Ffos-y-frân	Ffos-y-frân		Ffos-y-fran	Area	SO0605
Galon Uchaf	Galon Uchaf			Settlement	SO0508
Gelli-deg	Gelli-deg			Settlement	SO0207
Georgetown	Georgetown			Area	SO0406
Glyn Mil	Glyn Mil			Settlement	SO0504
Gurnos	Gurnos			Settlement	SO0407
Heol Abertawe	Swansea Road			Area	SO0306
Heolgerrig	Heolgerrig			Settlement	SO0306
Incline Top	Incline Top			Settlement	SO0506
Llwyn-onn	Llwyn-onn		Llwyn-on	Settlement	SO0111
Melincaeach	Melincaeach			Settlement	ST1096
Merthyr Tudful	Merthyr Tydfil			Settlement	SO0506
Morgantown	Morgantown			Settlement	SO0406
Mount Pleasant	Mount Pleasant			Settlement	ST0798
Mountain Hare	Mountain Hare			Settlement	SO0606
Mynwent y Crynwyr	Quakers Yard			Settlement	ST0996
Pengarn-ddu	Pengarn-ddu			Area	SO0708
Pentre-bach	Pentre-bach		Pentrebach	Settlement	SO0603
Pentwynberth-lwyd	Pentwynberth-lwyd			Settlement	ST1096
Penyard	Penyard			Settlement	SO0506
Penydarren	Penydarren			Settlement	SO0507
Pen-y-wern	Pen-y-wern			Settlement	SO0608
Pontmorlais	Pontmorlais			Settlement	SO0506
Pont-sarn	Pont-sarn			Settlement	SO0409
Pontsticill	Pontsticill			Settlement	SO0511
Rhyd-y-car	Rhyd-y-car			Settlement	SO0405
Thomastown	Thomastown			Settlement	SO0506
Trefechan	Trefechan			Settlement	SO0308
Treharris	Treharris			Settlement	ST0997
Trelewis	Trelewis			Settlement	ST1097
Troed-y-rhiw	Troed-y-rhiw			Settlement	SO0702
Twynyrodyn	Twynyrodyn			Settlement	SO0505
Ynys-fach	Ynys-fach			Settlement	SO0405
Ynysowen	Merthyr Vale			Settlement	ST0799
