= List of standardised Welsh place-names in Cardiff =

Location of the City and County of Cardiff in Wales.

The list of standardised Welsh place-names, for places in Cardiff, is a list compiled by the Welsh Language Commissioner to recommend the standardisation of the spelling of Welsh place-names, particularly in the Welsh language and when multiple forms are used, although some place-names in English were also recommended to be matched with the Welsh. The list contains 53 entries, as of November 2023.

The list is based on recommendations provided by the Place-names Standardisation Panel, convened by the Commissioner, for expert advice on the standardisation of Welsh place-names. The panel bases their decisions on a set of guidelines (currently dating to June 2023), specific to Welsh settlement names (such as those of villages, towns, and cities) and topographic features (such as lakes, mountains and rivers). The panel does not cover house or building names, although similar principles could be applied to them or to names for new developments (for which the Commissioner offers their own advice to local authorities and housing developers). The panel may also have used additional guidelines.

The list was first published in 2018, and took years to put together. Upon creation, these lists were published under the Open Government Licence 3.0.

== List ==
Recommended standardised names		Not recommended names		Type	Grid reference
Welsh	English	Welsh	English	Type	Grid reference
Adamsdown	Adamsdown			Settlement	ST1976
Caerau	Caerau			Settlement	ST1375
Caerdydd	Cardiff			Settlement	ST1876
Cathays	Cathays			Settlement	ST1877
Coryton	Coryton			Settlement	ST1481
Creigiau	Creigiau			Settlement	ST0881
Croes Cwrlwys	Culverhouse Cross			Settlement	ST1275
Cyncoed	Cyncoed			Settlement	ST1880
Cyntwell	Cyntwell			Settlement	ST1275
East Moors	East Moors			Settlement	ST2075
Yr Eglwys Newydd	Whitchurch			Settlement	ST1479
Gabalfa	Gabalfa			Settlement	ST1678
Glanyrafon	Riverside			Settlement	ST1776
Grangetown	Grangetown	Trelluest; Trefynach		Settlement	ST1774
Gwaelod-y-garth	Gwaelod-y-garth		Gwaelod-y-Garth	Settlement	ST1183
Lecwydd	Leckwith			Settlement	ST1574
Llandaf	Llandaf		Llandaff	Settlement	ST1577
Llanedern	Llanedern	Llanedeyrn	Llanedeyrn	Settlement	ST2181
Llaneirwg	St Mellons			Settlement	ST2381
Llanfihangel-ar-Elái	Michaelston-super-Ely			Settlement	ST1176
Llanisien	Llanishen			Settlement	ST1781
Llanrhymni	Llanrumney			Settlement	ST2280
Llwynbedw	Birchgrove			Settlement	ST1680
Llys-faen	Lisvane			Settlement	ST1883
Y Maendy	Maindy			Settlement	ST1778
Mynachdy	Mynachdy			Settlement	ST1678
Y Mynydd Bychan	Heath			Settlement	ST1779
Pant-mawr	Pant-mawr			Settlement	ST1481
Parc Cathays	Cathays Park			Settlement	ST1876
Parc Victoria	Victoria Park			Settlement	ST1576
Parc y Rhath	Roath Park			Settlement	ST1879
Pentre-poeth	Morganstown			Settlement	ST1281
Pentwyn	Pentwyn			Settlement	ST2081
Pentyrch	Pentyrch			Settlement	ST1082
Pen-y-lan	Pen-y-lan		Penylan	Settlement	ST1978
Pontcanna	Pontcanna			Settlement	ST1677
Pontprennau	Pontprennau			Settlement	ST2082
Radur	Radyr			Settlement	ST1280
Y Rhath	Roath			Settlement	ST1977
Rhiwbeina/Rhiwbina	Rhiwbina			Settlement	ST1581
Rhydlafar	Rhydlafar			Settlement	ST1179
Sain Ffagan	St Fagans			Settlement	ST1277
Y Sblot	Splott			Settlement	ST1976
Soar	Soar			Settlement	ST0982
Tongwynlais	Tongwynlais			Settlement	ST1382
Tredelerch	Rumney			Settlement	ST2179
Treganna	Canton			Settlement	ST1676
Trelái	Ely			Settlement	ST1376
Tremorfa	Tremorfa			Settlement	ST2177
Trowbridge	Trowbridge			Settlement	ST2380
Y Tyllgoed	Fairwater			Settlement	ST1377
Y Ddraenen	Thornhill			Settlement	ST1584
Ystum Taf	Llandaf North		Llandaff North	Settlement	ST1578
