= List of standardised Welsh place-names in Bridgend County Borough =

Location of Bridgend County Borough in Wales.

The list of standardised Welsh place-names, for places in Bridgend County Borough, is a list compiled by the Welsh Language Commissioner to recommend the standardisation of the spelling of Welsh place-names, particularly in the Welsh language and when multiple forms are used, although some place-names in English were also recommended to be matched with the Welsh. The list contains 87 entries, as of November 2023.

The list is based on recommendations provided by the Place-names Standardisation Panel, convened by the Commissioner, for expert advice on the standardisation of Welsh place-names. The panel bases their decisions on a set of guidelines (currently dating to June 2023), specific to Welsh settlement names (such as those of villages, towns, and cities) and topographic features (such as lakes, mountains and rivers). The panel does not cover house or building names, although similar principles could be applied to them or to names for new developments (for which the Commissioner offers their own advice to local authorities and housing developers). The panel may also have used additional guidelines.

The list was first published in 2018, and took years to put together. Upon creation, these lists were published under the Open Government Licence 3.0.

== List ==
Recommended standardised names		Other name/spelling not recommended	Type	Grid reference
Welsh	English	Other name/spelling not recommended	Type	Grid reference
Abercynffig	Aberkenfig		Settlement	SS8983
Abergarw	Abergarw		Settlement	SS9184
Betws	Betws	Bettws	Settlement	SS8986
Blaengarw	Blaengarw		Settlement	SS9092
Bracla	Brackla		Settlement	SS9280
Braichycymer	Braichycymer		Settlement	SS9090
Bryncethin	Bryncethin		Settlement	SS9184
Bryn-coch	Bryn-coch		Settlement	SS9083
Brynheulog	Brynheulog		Settlement	SS8594
Brynmenyn	Brynmenyn		Settlement	SS9084
Bryntirion	Bryntirion		Settlement	SS8880
Byeastwood	Byeastwood		Settlement	SS9281
Caerau	Caerau		Settlement	SS8594
Castellnewydd	Newcastle		Settlement	SS9079
Cefncribwr	Cefncribwr	Cefn Cribwr	Settlement	SS8582
Cefn-glas	Cefn-glas	Cefn Glas	Settlement	SS8980
Coety	Coity		Settlement	SS9281
Corneli Waelod	South Cornelly		Settlement	SS8180
Cwmfelin	Cwmfelin		Settlement	SS8689
Cwmogwr	Ogmore Vale		Settlement	SS9390
Cwrtcolman	Cwrtcolman		Settlement	SS8881
Cymdda	Cymdda		Settlement	SS9083
Cynffig	Kenfig		Settlement	SS8081
Derwen	Derwen		Settlement	SS9182
Dyffryn	Dyffryn		Settlement	SS851937
Evanstown	Evanstown		Settlement	SS9789
Y Felin-wyllt	Wild Mill	Wildmill	Settlement	SS9081
Fforddygyfraith	Fforddygyfraith		Settlement	SS8684
Fountain	Fountain		Settlement	SS8883
Garth	Garth		Settlement	SS8690
Gilfach-goch	Gilfach-goch	Gilfach Goch	Settlement	SS9889
Glyn-llan	Glyn-llan		Settlement	SS9487
Glynogwr	Glynogwr		Settlement	SS9587
Goetre-hen	Coytrahen		Settlement	SS8985
Gogledd Corneli	North Cornelly		Settlement	SS8181
Hendre	Hendre		Settlement	SS9381
Hengastell	Oldcastle		Area	SS9179
Heol-laethog	Heol-laethog		Settlement	SS9284
Heol-y-cyw	Heol-y-cyw	Heol-y-Cyw	Settlement	SS9484
Lewistown	Lewistown		Settlement	SS9388
Llandudwg	Tythegston		Settlement	SS8578
Llangeinwyr	Llangeinor		Settlement	SS9187
Llangewydd	Llangewydd		Area	SS8780
Llangrallo	Coychurch		Settlement	SS9379
Llangynwyd	Llangynwyd		Settlement	SS8588
Lletybrongu	Lletybrongu		Settlement	SS8789
Llidiard	Litchard		Settlement	SS9081
Lock's Common	Lock's Common		Area	SS8077
Maesteg	Maesteg		Settlement	SS8591
Mawdlam	Mawdlam		Settlement	SS8081
Melin Ifan Ddu	Blackmill		Settlement	SS9386
Merthyr Mawr	Merthyr Mawr		Settlement	SS8877
Mynyddcynffig	Kenfig Hill		Settlement	SS8383
Nantyffyllon	Nantyffyllon		Settlement	SS8592
Nant-y-moel	Nant-y-moel		Settlement	SS9392
Notais	Nottage		Settlement	SS8178
Pant-y-gog	Pant-y-gog		Settlement	SS9090
Pantypyllau	Pantypyllau		Area	SS9282
Pantyrawel	Pantyrawel		Settlement	SS9287
Pencoed	Pencoed		Settlement	SS9681
Pen-dre	Pen-dre		Settlement	SS9081
Pen-prysg	Pen-prysg	Penprysg	Settlement	SS9682
Pen-y-bont ar Ogwr	Bridgend		Settlement	SS9079
Pen-y-cae	Pen-y-cae		Settlement	SS9082
Pen-y-fai	Pen-y-fai		Settlement	SS8982
Penyrheol	Penyrheol		Settlement	SS9282
Y Pîl	Pyle		Settlement	SS8282
Pont-rhyd-y-cyff	Pont-rhyd-y-cyff		Settlement	SS8688
Pontycymer	Pontycymer		Settlement	SS9091
Pont-y-rhyl	Pont-y-rhyl		Settlement	SS9089
Porthcawl	Porthcawl		Settlement	SS8277
Price Town	Price Town		Settlement	SS9392
Rhiwceiliog	Rhiwceiliog		Settlement	SS9784
Sarn	Sarn		Settlement	SS9083
Shelf	Shelf		Settlement	SS9380
Shwt	Shwt		Settlement	SS8986
Spelter	Spelter		Settlement	SS8593
Ton-du	Ton-du	Tondu	Settlement	SS8984
Traeth Treco	Trecco Bay		Topographical feature	SS8376
Tredŵr	Waterton		Settlement	SS9278
Trelales	Laleston		Settlement	SS8779
Tremains	Tremains		Settlement	SS9179
Twmpath Diwlith	Twmpath Diwlith		Man-made feature	SS8388
Tyla-gwyn	Tyla-gwyn		Settlement	SS9188
Tyn-y-garn	Tyn-y-garn		Settlement	SS8982
Wig-fach	Wig-fach		Settlement	SS8477
Wyndham	Wyndham		Settlement	SS9391
