= List of standardised Welsh place-names in the Vale of Glamorgan =

Location of the County Borough of the Vale of Glamorgan in Wales.

The list of standardised Welsh place-names, for places in the Vale of Glamorgan, is a list compiled by the Welsh Language Commissioner to recommend the standardisation of the spelling of Welsh place-names, particularly in the Welsh language and when multiple forms are used, although some place-names in English were also recommended to be matched with the Welsh. The list contains 122 entries, as of November 2023.

The list is based on recommendations provided by the Place-names Standardisation Panel, convened by the Commissioner, for expert advice on the standardisation of Welsh place-names. The panel bases their decisions on a set of guidelines (currently dating to June 2023), specific to Welsh settlement names (such as those of villages, towns, and cities) and topographic features (such as lakes, mountains and rivers). The panel does not cover house or building names, although similar principles could be applied to them or to names for new developments (for which the Commissioner offers their own advice to local authorities and housing developers). The panel may also have used additional guidelines.

The list was first published in 2018, and took years to put together. Upon creation, these lists were published under the Open Government Licence 3.0.

== List ==
Recommended standardised names		Other name/spelling not recommended	Type	Grid reference
Welsh	English	Other name/spelling not recommended	Type	Grid reference
Aberogwr	Ogmore-by-sea	Ogmore-by-Sea	Settlement	SS8674
Aberthin	Aberthin		Settlement	ST0075
Yr As Fawr	Monknash		Settlement	SS9170
Y Barri	Barry		Settlement	ST1068
Beggars Pound	Beggars Pound		Settlement	ST0168
Y Bont-faen	Cowbridge		Settlement	SS9974
Boys Village	Boys Village		Settlement	ST0267
Brychdwn	Broughton		Settlement	SS9271
Burdonshill	Burdonshill		Settlement	ST1171
Caermead	Caermead		Man-made feature	SS9569
Capel Llanilltern	Capel Llanilltern		Settlement	ST0979
Castle-upon-Alun	Castle-upon-Alun		Settlement	SS9174
City	City		Settlement	SS9978
Clawdd-coch	Clawdd-coch	Clawdd Coch	Settlement	ST0577
Cog	Cog		Settlement	ST1668
Cogan	Cogan		Settlement	ST1772
Colcot	Colcot		Settlement	ST1169
Corntwn	Corntown		Settlement	SS9177
Cosmeston	Cosmeston		Settlement	ST1869
Craig Pen-llin	Craig Pen-llin		Settlement	SS9777
Crosstown	Crosstown		Settlement	ST0469
Dimlands	Dimlands		Settlement	SS9568
Dinas Powys	Dinas Powys		Settlement	ST1571
Doc y Barri	Barry Dock		Settlement	ST1268
Downs	Downs		Settlement	ST1074
Dwyrain Aberddawan	East Aberthaw		Settlement	ST0366
East Village	East Village		Settlement	SS9974
Eastbrook	Eastbrook		Settlement	ST1571
Eglwys Brewys	Eglwys Brewys	Eglwys Brewis	Settlement	ST0069
Eglwys Fair y Mynydd	St Mary Hill		Settlement	SS9678
Ffontygari	Ffontygari		Settlement	ST0566
Ffwl-y-mwn	Fonmon		Settlement	ST0467
Gorllewin Aberddawan	West Aberthaw		Settlement	ST0266
Gwenfô	Wenvoe		Settlement	ST1272
Gwern-y-steeple	Gwern-y-steeple	Gwern-y-Steeple	Settlement	ST0775
Hensol	Hensol		Settlement	ST0479
Heolymynydd	Heolymynydd		Settlement	SS8874
The Herberts	The Herberts		Settlement	SS9971
Heronston	Heronston		Settlement	SS9178
The Knap	The Knap		Area	ST0966
Larnog	Lavernock		Settlement	ST1868
Llanbedr-y-fro	Peterston-super-Ely		Settlement	ST0876
Llanbydderi	Llanbethery		Settlement	ST0369
Llancarfan	Llancarfan		Settlement	ST0570
Llancatal	Llancadle		Settlement	ST0368
Llanddunwyd	Welsh St Donats		Settlement	ST0276
Llandochau	Llandough		Settlement	SS9972
Llandochau	Llandough		Settlement	ST1673
Llandŵ	Llandow		Settlement	SS9473
Llan-faes	Llanmaes		Settlement	SS9869
Llan-fair	St Mary Church		Settlement	ST0071
Llanfeuthin	Llanvithyn		Settlement	ST0471
Llanffa	Llampha		Settlement	SS9275
Llanfihangel y Bont-faen	Llanmihangel		Settlement	SS9871
Llanfihangel-y-pwll	Michaelston-le-Pit		Settlement	ST1572
Llanfleiddan	Llanblethian		Settlement	SS9974
Llanganna	Llangan		Settlement	SS9577
Llanilltud Fawr	Llantwit Major		Settlement	SS9768
Llansanffraid-ar-Elái	St Brides-super-Ely		Settlement	ST0977
Llansanwyr	Llansannor		Settlement	SS9977
Llantriddyd	Llantriddyd	Llantrithyd	Settlement	ST0472
Llwyneliddon	St Lythans		Settlement	ST1072
Llyswyrny	Llysworney		Settlement	SS9674
Maendy	Maendy		Settlement	ST0176
Marcroes	Marcross		Settlement	SS9269
Merthyr Dyfan	Merthyr Dyfan		Settlement	ST1169
Morristown	Morristown		Settlement	ST1771
Moulton	Moulton		Settlement	ST0770
Murch	Murch		Settlement	ST1671
Ogwr	Ogmore		Settlement	SS8876
Palmerstown	Palmerstown		Settlement	ST1369
Pancross	Pancross		Settlement	ST0469
Penarth	Penarth		Settlement	ST1871
Penarth Isaf	Lower Penarth		Settlement	ST1870
Pendeulwyn	Pendoylan		Settlement	ST0676
Pen-llin	Pen-llin	Penllyn	Settlement	SS9776
Pen-marc	Penmark		Settlement	ST0568
Pennon	Pennon		Settlement	ST0569
Pentremeurig	Pentre Meyrick		Settlement	SS9675
Picketston	Picketston		Settlement	ST0069
Pitcot	Pitcot		Settlement	SS8974
Porthceri	Porthkerry		Settlement	ST0866
Porthceri Isaf	Lower Porthkerry		Settlement	ST0766
Prysg	Prisk		Settlement	ST0176
Pwll-y-wrach	Pwll-y-wrach	Pwllywrach	Man-made feature	SS9575
Y Rhws	Rhoose		Settlement	ST0666
Sain Dunwyd	St Donats		Settlement	SS9368
Sain Nicolas	St Nicholas		Settlement	ST0974
Sain Tathan	St Athan		Settlement	ST1067
Saint Andras	St Andrews Major		Settlement	ST1371
Saint Hilari	St Hilary		Settlement	ST0173
Saint-y-brid	St Brides Major		Settlement	SS8974
Saint-y-nyll	Saint-y-nyll		Settlement	ST0978
Sili	Sully		Settlement	ST1568
Silstwn	Gileston		Settlement	ST0167
Southerndown	Southerndown		Settlement	SS8873
Swanbridge	Swanbridge		Settlement	ST1667
Tonbreigam	Tonbreigam		Settlement	SS9979
Tre-Aubrey	Tre-Aubrey		Settlement	ST0372
Trebefered	Boverton		Settlement	SS9868
Tredodridge	Tredodridge		Settlement	ST0577
Tredogan	Tredogan		Settlement	ST0767
Trefflemin	Flemingston		Settlement	ST0170
Tregatwg	Cadoxton		Settlement	ST1269
Tregolwyn	Colwinston		Settlement	SS9475
Tre-hyl	Tre-hill		Settlement	ST0874
Tre-os	Tre-os		Settlement	SS9478
Tre-pit	Tre-pit		Settlement	SS9172
Trerhingyll	Trerhingyll	Trerhyngyll	Settlement	ST0076
Tresigin	Sigingstone		Settlement	SS9771
Tresimwn	Bonvilston		Settlement	ST0674
Trewallter	Walterston		Settlement	ST0671
Trwyn Larnog	Lavernock Point		Topographical feature	ST1868
Twynyrodyn	Twynyrodyn	Twyn-yr-Odyn	Settlement	ST1173
Wallston	Wallston		Settlement	ST1273
West Village	West Village		Settlement	SS9974
Westra	Westra		Settlement	ST1471
Whiterock	Whiterock		Settlement	SS9078
Y Wig	Wick		Settlement	SS9272
Wyndham Park	Wyndham Park		Settlement	ST0876
Ynys y Barri	Barry Island		Settlement	ST1166
Ystradowen	Ystradowen		Settlement	ST0177
