= List of standardised Welsh place-names in Conwy County Borough =

Location of Conwy County Borough in Wales.

The list of standardised Welsh place-names, for places in Conwy County Borough, is a list compiled by the Welsh Language Commissioner to recommend the standardisation of the spelling of Welsh place-names, particularly in the Welsh language and when multiple forms are used, although some place-names in English were also recommended to be matched with the Welsh. The list contains 85 entries, as of November 2023.

The list is based on recommendations provided by the Place-names Standardisation Panel, convened by the Commissioner, for expert advice on the standardisation of Welsh place-names. The panel bases their decisions on a set of guidelines (currently dating to June 2023), specific to Welsh settlement names (such as those of villages, towns, and cities) and topographic features (such as lakes, mountains and rivers). The panel does not cover house or building names, although similar principles could be applied to them or to names for new developments (for which the Commissioner offers their own advice to local authorities and housing developers). The panel may also have used additional guidelines.

The list was first published in 2018, and took years to put together. Upon creation, these lists were published under the Open Government Licence 3.0.

== List ==
Recommended standardised names		Other name/spelling not recommended	Type	Grid reference
Welsh	English	Other name/spelling not recommended	Type	Grid reference
Abergele	Abergele		Settlement	SH9477
Bae Cinmel	Kinmel Bay		Settlement	SH9880
Bae Colwyn	Colwyn Bay		Settlement	SH8678
Belgrano	Belgrano		Settlement	SH9578
Betws-y-coed	Betws-y-coed	Betws-y-Coed	Settlement	SH7956
Betws-yn-Rhos	Betws-yn-Rhos	Betws yn Rhos	Settlement	SH8974
Bontnewydd	Bontnewydd		Settlement	SJ0170
Brymbo	Brymbo		Settlement	SH8071
Bryn-y-maen	Bryn-y-maen		Settlement	SH8376
Bylchau	Bylchau		Settlement	SH9762
Caerhun	Caerhun		Settlement	SH7770
Capel Curig	Capel Curig		Settlement	SH7258
Capel Garmon	Capel Garmon		Settlement	SH8154
Capel Ulo	Capel Ulo		Settlement	SH7476
Cefnberain	Cefnberain		Settlement	SH9969
Cefn-brith	Cefn-brith		Settlement	SH9350
Cerrigydrudion	Cerrigydrudion		Settlement	SH9548
Conwy	Conwy		Settlement	SH7777
Craig-y-don	Craig-y-don	Craig-y-Don	Settlement	SH7981
Cwm Penmachno	Cwm Penmachno		Settlement	SH7547
Cyffordd Llandudno	Llandudno Junction		Settlement	SH7978
Dawn	Dawn		Settlement	SH8672
Deganwy	Deganwy		Settlement	SH7779
Dinmael	Dinmael		Settlement	SJ0044
Dolgarrog	Dolgarrog		Settlement	SH7767
Dolwyddelan	Dolwyddelan		Settlement	SH7352
Dwygyfylchi	Dwygyfylchi		Settlement	SH7377
Eglwys-bach	Eglwys-bach	Eglwysbach	Settlement	SH8070
Esgyryn	Esgyryn		Settlement	SH8078
Gell	Gell		Settlement	SH8469
Glanwydden	Glanwydden		Settlement	SH8180
Glasfryn	Glasfryn		Settlement	SH9150
Graig	Graig		Settlement	SH8071
Groesffordd	Groesffordd		Settlement	SH7775
Gwytherin	Gwytherin		Settlement	SH8761
Hen Golwyn	Old Colwyn		Settlement	SH8678
Henryd	Henryd		Settlement	SH7774
Llanbedrycennin	Llanbedrycennin	Llanbedr-y-Cennin	Settlement	SH7569
Llanddoged	Llanddoged		Settlement	SH8063
Llanddulas	Llanddulas		Settlement	SH9078
Llandrillo-yn-Rhos	Rhos-on-Sea		Settlement	SH8380
Llandudno	Llandudno		Settlement	SH7881
Llanefydd	Llanefydd	Llannefydd	Settlement	SH9870
Llanelian-yn-Rhos	Llanelian-yn-Rhos		Settlement	SH8676
Llanfair Talhaearn	Llanfair Talhaearn	Llanfair Talhaiarn	Settlement	SH9270
Llanfairfechan	Llanfairfechan		Settlement	SH6874
Llanfihangel Glyn Myfyr	Llanfihangel Glyn Myfyr		Settlement	SH9949
Llangernyw	Llangernyw		Settlement	SH8767
Llangwm	Llangwm		Settlement	SH9644
Llangystennin	Llangystennin		Settlement	SH8279
Llan-rhos	Llan-rhos	Llanrhos	Settlement	SH7980
Llanrhychwyn	Llanrhychwyn		Settlement	SH7761
Llanrwst	Llanrwst		Settlement	SH8061
Llansanffraid Glan Conwy	Llansanffraid Glan Conwy	Glan Conwy	Settlement	SH8075
Llansannan	Llansannan		Settlement	SH9365
Llansansiôr	St George		Settlement	SH9775
Llysfaen	Llysfaen		Settlement	SH8877
Maenan	Maenan		Settlement	SH7966
Melin-y-coed	Melin-y-coed	Melin-y-Coed	Settlement	SH8160
Mochdre	Mochdre		Settlement	SH8278
Moelfre	Moelfre		Settlement	SH9574
Nant Bwlchyrhaearn	Nant Bwlchyrhaearn		Area	SH7759
Nantyfelin	Nantyfelin		Settlement	SH6874
Nantypandy	Nantypandy		Settlement	SH6974
Nebo	Nebo		Settlement	SH8356
Pandytudur	Pandytudur	Pandy Tudur	Settlement	SH8564
Penmachno	Penmachno		Settlement	SH7950
Penmaenmawr	Penmaenmawr		Settlement	SH7176
Pen-sarn	Pen-sarn	Pensarn	Settlement	SH9578
Pentre Tafarnyfedw	Pentre Tafarnyfedw		Settlement	SH8162
Pentrefoelas	Pentrefoelas		Settlement	SH8751
Pont-y-pant	Pont-y-pant	Pont-y-Pant	Settlement	SH7553
Rhydlydan	Rhydlydan		Settlement	SH8950
Rhyd-y-foel	Rhyd-y-foel	Rhyd y Foel	Settlement	SH9176
Tal-y-bont	Tal-y-bont		Settlement	SH7668
Tal-y-cafn	Tal-y-cafn	Tal-y-Cafn	Settlement	SH7971
Tan-y-fron	Tan-y-fron		Settlement	SH9564
Towyn	Towyn		Settlement	SH9779
Trefriw	Trefriw		Settlement	SH7863
Trofarth	Trofarth		Settlement	SH8570
Tŷ-nant	Tŷ-nant		Settlement	SH9944
Tyn-y-groes	Tyn-y-groes	Ty'n-y-Groes	Settlement	SH7771
Tywyn	Tywyn		Settlement	SH7878
Ysbyty Ifan	Ysbyty Ifan		Settlement	SH8448
