= List of standardised Welsh place-names in Rhondda Cynon Taf =

Location of the County Borough of Rhondda Cynon Taf in Wales.

The list of standardised Welsh place-names, for places in Rhondda Cynon Taf, is a list compiled by the Welsh Language Commissioner to recommend the standardisation of the spelling of Welsh place-names, particularly in the Welsh language and when multiple forms are used, although some place-names in English were also recommended to be matched with the Welsh. The list contains 124 entries, as of November 2023.

The list is based on recommendations provided by the Place-names Standardisation Panel, convened by the commissioner, for expert advice on the standardisation of Welsh place-names. The panel bases their decisions on a set of guidelines (currently dating to June 2023), specific to Welsh settlement names (such as those of villages, towns, and cities) and topographic features (such as lakes, mountains and rivers). The panel does not cover house or building names, although similar principles could be applied to them or to names for new developments (for which the commissioner offers their own advice to local authorities and housing developers). The panel may also have used additional guidelines.

The list was first published in 2018, and took years to put together. Upon creation, these lists were published under the Open Government Licence 3.0.

== List ==
Recommended standardised names		Other name/spelling not recommended	Type	Grid reference
Welsh	English	Other name/spelling not recommended	Type	Grid reference
Aberaman	Aberaman		Settlement	SO0101
Abercwmboi	Abercwmboi		Settlement	ST0299
Abercynon	Abercynon		Settlement	ST0895
Aberdâr	Aberdare		Settlement	SO0002
Abergorci	Abergorci		Area	SS9597
Aber-nant	Aber-nant	Abernant	Settlement	SO0103
Aberpennar	Mountain Ash		Settlement	ST0499
Beddau	Beddau		Settlement	ST0585
Blaenaman	Blaenaman		Area	SS9899
Blaenclydach	Blaenclydach		Settlement	SS9893
Blaen-cwm	Blaen-cwm	Blaencwm	Settlement	SS9298
Blaencwmboi	Blaencwmboi		Area	ST0299
Blaen-gwawr	Blaen-gwawr	Blaengwawr	Area	SO0001
Blaenllechau	Blaenllechau		Settlement	SS9997
Blaenrhondda	Blaenrhondda		Settlement	SS9299
Bodringallt	Bodringallt		Area	SS9895
Bryn-cae	Bryn-cae		Settlement	SS9882
Brynna	Brynna		Settlement	SS9883
Brynnaugwynion	Brynnaugwynion		Settlement	SS9782
Brynsadler	Brynsadler		Settlement	ST0280
Carnetown	Carnetown		Settlement	ST0794
Castellau	Castellau		Settlement	ST0586
Cefn Rhigos	Cefn Rhigos		Settlement	SN9106
Cefnpennar	Cefnpennar		Settlement	SO0300
Cilfynydd	Cilfynydd		Settlement	ST0892
Coedelái	Coed-ely	Coed-Ely	Settlement	ST0185
Cross Inn	Cross Inn		Settlement	ST0583
Cwmaman	Cwmaman		Settlement	ST0099
Cwm-bach	Cwm-bach	Cwmbach	Settlement	SO0201
Cwmclydach	Clydach Vale		Settlement	SS9793
Cwmdâr	Cwmdare		Settlement	SN9803
Cwm-hwnt	Cwm-hwnt	Cwm-Hwnt	Settlement	SN9105
Cwm-parc	Cwm-parc	Cwmparc	Settlement	SS9596
Cwmpennar	Cwmpennar		Settlement	SO0300
Y Cymer	Y Cymer	Cymmer	Settlement	ST0290
Darran-las	Darran-las	Darranlas	Area	ST0498
Y Ddraenen-wen	Hawthorn		Settlement	ST0988
Dinas	Dinas		Settlement	ST0191
Edmondstown	Edmondstown		Settlement	ST0090
Efail-fach	Efail-fach		Settlement	ST0884
Efailisaf	Efailisaf	Efail Isaf	Settlement	ST0884
Ffynnon Taf	Taff's Well		Settlement	ST1283
Y Gadlys	Y Gadlys	Gadlys	Settlement	SN9902
Glan-bad	Upper Boat		Settlement	ST1087
Glan-llyn	Glan-llyn		Settlement	ST1284
Glyn-coch	Glyn-coch	Glyncoch	Settlement	ST0792
Glynrhedynog	Ferndale		Settlement	SS9996
Glyn-taf	Glyn-taf	Glyntaff	Settlement	ST0889
Godreaman	Godreaman		Area	SO0100
Graig	Graig		Settlement	ST0689
Graig-wen	Graig-wen		Settlement	ST0690
Y Groes-faen	Y Groes-faen	Groes-faen	Settlement	ST0681
Gyfeillion	Gyfeillion	Gyfeillon	Area	ST0590
Hendreforgan	Hendreforgan		Settlement	SS9888
Hirwaun	Hirwaun		Settlement	SN9605
Llanharan	Llanharan		Settlement	ST0083
Llanhari	Llanharry		Settlement	ST0080
Llanilid	Llanilid		Settlement	SS9781
Llanilltud Faerdref	Llantwit Fardre		Settlement	ST0784
Llantrisant	Llantrisant		Settlement	ST0483
Llanwynno	Llanwynno	Llanwonno	Settlement	ST0395
Llwydcoed	Llwydcoed		Settlement	SN9904
Llwyncelyn	Llwyncelyn		Area	ST0391
Llwynypia	Llwynypia		Settlement	SS9993
Maerdy	Maerdy		Area	SS9798
Maes-y-coed	Maes-y-coed	Maesycoed	Settlement	ST0689
Meisgyn	Miskin		Settlement	ST0498
Mwyndy	Mwyndy		Settlement	ST0581
Nantgarw	Nantgarw		Settlement	ST1285
Pant-y-graig-wen	Pant-y-graig-wen		Area	ST0690
Penderyn	Penderyn		Settlement	SN9408
Penrhiw-ceibr	Penrhiw-ceibr	Penrhiwceiber	Settlement	ST0597
Penrhiw-fer	Penrhiw-fer	Penrhiwfer	Settlement	ST0090
Penrhiw-llech	Penrhiw-llech		Area	SN9702
Pen-rhys	Pen-rhys	Penrhys	Settlement	ST0095
Pentre	Pentre		Settlement	SS9796
Pentre-bach	Pentre-bach	Pentrebach	Settlement	ST0889
Pentre'r Eglwys	Church Village		Settlement	ST0886
Penycoedcae	Penycoedcae	Pen-y-coedcae	Settlement	ST0687
Pen-y-graig	Pen-y-graig	Penygraig	Settlement	SS9991
Pen-y-groes	Pen-y-groes		Area	ST1187
Penyrenglyn	Penyrenglyn		Settlement	SS9497
Pen-y-waun	Pen-y-waun	Penywaun	Settlement	SN9704
Perthcelyn	Perthcelyn		Settlement	ST0597
Pont Siôn Norton	Pont Siôn Norton	Pontsionnorton	Area	ST0891
Pont-y-clun	Pont-y-clun	Pontyclun	Settlement	ST0381
Pont-y-gwaith	Pont-y-gwaith	Pontygwaith	Settlement	ST0094
Pontypridd	Pontypridd		Settlement	ST0789
Porth	Porth		Settlement	ST0291
Pwll-gwaun	Pwll-gwaun	Pwllgwaun	Settlement	ST0690
Y Rhigos	Y Rhigos	Rhigos	Settlement	SN9205
Rhiwinder	Rhiwinder		Area	ST0287
Rhiwsaeson	Rhiwsaeson		Settlement	ST0782
Rhydfelen	Rhydfelen	Rhydyfelin	Settlement	ST0988
Stanleytown	Stanleytown		Settlement	ST0194
Tonpentre	Tonpentre	Ton Pentre	Settlement	SS9695
Ton-teg	Ton-teg	Tonteg	Settlement	ST0986
Tonypandy	Tonypandy		Settlement	SS9992
Tonyrefail	Tonyrefail		Settlement	ST0188
Tonysguboriau	Talbot Green		Settlement	ST0382
Trealaw	Trealaw		Settlement	SS9992
Trebannog	Trebannog	Trebanog	Settlement	ST0190
Trecynon	Trecynon		Settlement	SN9903
Trefforest	Trefforest	Treforest	Settlement	ST0888
Trehafod	Trehafod		Settlement	ST0491
Treherbert	Treherbert		Settlement	SS9498
Trehopcyn	Hopkinstown		Settlement	ST0690
Tresalem	Robertstown		Settlement	SO0003
Tretomas	Thomastown		Settlement	ST0087
Trewiliam	Williamstown		Settlement	ST0090
Tylegarw	Tylegarw	Tyla Garw	Settlement	ST0281
Tylorstown	Tylorstown		Settlement	ST0095
Tŷ-nant	Tŷ-nant		Settlement	ST0685
Tynewydd	Tynewydd		Settlement	SS9398
Tyntetown	Tyntetown		Settlement	ST0696
Tyn-y-bryn	Tyn-y-bryn		Settlement	ST0087
Tŷ-rhiw	Tŷ-rhiw		Settlement	ST1283
Wattstown	Wattstown		Settlement	ST0193
Ynys-boeth	Ynys-boeth	Ynysboeth	Settlement	ST0796
Ynys-hir	Ynys-hir	Ynyshir	Settlement	ST0292
Ynysmaerdy	Ynysmaerdy		Settlement	ST0384
Ynys-wen	Ynys-wen	Ynyswen	Settlement	SS9597
Ynys-y-bwl	Ynys-y-bwl	Ynysybwl	Settlement	ST0594
Ystrad	Ystrad		Settlement	SS9895
