= List of standardised Welsh place-names =

The list of standardised Welsh place-names is a list compiled by the Welsh Language Commissioner to recommend the standardisation of the spelling of Welsh place-names, particularly in the Welsh language and when multiple forms are used, although some place-names in English were also recommended to be matched with the Welsh. The list contains almost 3,500 entries, as of November 2023.

The list is based on recommendations provided by the Place-names Standardisation Panel, convened by the Commissioner, for expert advice on the standardisation of Welsh place-names. The panel bases their decisions on a set of guidelines (currently dating to June 2023), specific to Welsh settlement names (such as those of villages, towns, and cities) and topographic features (such as lakes, mountains and rivers). The panel does not cover house or building names, although similar principles could be applied to them or on names for new developments (for which the Commissioner offers their own advice to local authorities and housing developers). The panel may also have used additional guidelines.

The list was first published in 2018, and took years to put together. Upon creation, these lists were published under the Open Government Licence 3.0.

The list is merely a recommendation towards local authorities, which they retain the power whether to implement the recommendations. The commissioner is not tasked with enforcing the recommendations.

In 2021, Ceredigion County Council announced it would consider implementing the list recommendations of the Commissioner in Ceredigion.

== Panel guidelines ==
The following is based on the panel's guideline as of June 2023.

The panel tries to follow Welsh language orthography, and recognises the authority of Geiriadur Prifysgol Cymru (The University of Wales Dictionary of the Welsh Language) on the matter, following the form the dictionary provides as much as possible. However, the panel decided to recommend the use of a circumflex (long sign) for some names, even if not a Welsh orthographical standard, to "avoid ambiguity and ensure correct pronunciation".

The panel also considered closely following the "Rhestr o Enwau Lleoedd/A Gazetteer of Welsh Place-Names" by Elwyn Davies, as well as previous recommendations of the Welsh Language Board's place-names standardisation team. However, the panel recognised that some entries, since 1967, in the Gazetteer may now be out of date or not representative of the modern "linguistic climate", therefore some place-names may not have to be the same as in the Gazetteer.

The guidance also explained when the panel is to recommend the use of hyphens, an apostrophe or diaeresis, one vs. two words, the use of the Welsh definite article (y/yr/'r), and its relation to emphasis, place-names named after persons, creating new names, recognising local dialects, and dual forms (closely related English and Welsh versions). For English place-names in Wales referring to saints, the guideline also recommends standardisation, for example, St Davids. The panel recommends the omission of the full stop (St.) and the apostrophe (David's), creating the standard form as "St Davids" rather than "St. David's".

The guidelines recommend the standardisation of topographical names that are tautologous, where a name repeats an element. For example, "Llyn" (meaning 'lake') may appear within names, such as Glaslyn, (Note: In this case, a mutated form) so recommends avoiding Llyn Glaslyn. However, if the tautologous name is commonly used or used to distinguish between other features (for example, between a river and a lake, Llyn Hiraethlyn and Afon Hiraethlyn), then the panel is to respect its use and maintain the name.

The guideline also recommended use of a single form in both Welsh and English, in place of any existing dual forms (where the names in either language are very similar), if there is only a minor difference of one or two letters, with preference being given to the Welsh form of the name. The guidance was based on the recommendations of the Ordnance Survey and highway authorities. However. the guideline states that established variations should be recognised: for example, Caeriw/Carew, Biwmares/Beaumaris, Y Fflint/Flint, and Wrecsam/Wrexham.

In 2023, Jeremy Miles, Minister for Education and Welsh Language, stated there is "a strong argument" for using only the Welsh spelling of place-names rather than two versions in English and Welsh, if there is only a minor difference of a "few letters" between them. The protection of Welsh place names forms part of the Welsh Government's 2021 agreement with the Welsh nationalist party, Plaid Cymru. The panel has six members.

The Commissioner also advises local authorities or housing developers to avoid mutating place names and integrating the Welsh definite article (y/yr/'r), on road signs in Wales, and to maintain the unmutated form of the name in both languages on signage. For example, using "Croeso, Caernarfon" rather than "Croeso i Gaernarfon", and "Croeso, Y Bala" rather than "Croeso i’r Bala", so one form of the place-name is only needed on the sign. The Commissioner also suggested expanding the welcome phrasing from "Croeso i" (Welcome to) to something longer like "Croeso i bentref" (Welcome to the village of) as another alternative, that would also ensure only "Caernarfon" or "Y Bala" is needed, rather than "Gaernarfon/Caernarfon" and "... i'r Bala" and "Y Bala".

== Notable entries ==
A selection of entry changes were selected by BBC News in 2018, and they were:

- Use Abermo in Welsh for Barmouth, over the two Welsh names Abermaw and Y Bermo.
- Use Aber-porth over Aberporth in both Welsh and English.
- Use Dyfnant over Dynfant, in Welsh.
- Use Penlle'r-gaer over Penllergaer in both Welsh and English.
- Use Pont-Lliw over Pontlliw in both Welsh and English.
- Use Llandaf over Llandaff in English.
- Use Merthyr Tudful over Merthyr Tydfil in Welsh.

"in Welsh" or "in English" means the names in the other language is unaffected, unless under "in both Welsh and English".

The list may have since been altered since 2018 for the entries above.

== Lists ==
- List of standardised Welsh place-names in Anglesey
- List of standardised Welsh place-names in Blaenau Gwent
- List of standardised Welsh place-names in Bridgend County Borough
- List of standardised Welsh place-names in Caerphilly County Borough
- List of standardised Welsh place-names in Cardiff
- List of standardised Welsh place-names in Carmarthenshire
- List of standardised Welsh place-names in Ceredigion
- List of standardised Welsh place-names in Conwy County Borough
- List of standardised Welsh place-names in Denbighshire
- List of standardised Welsh place-names in Flintshire
- List of standardised Welsh place-names in Gwynedd
- List of standardised Welsh place-names in Merthyr Tydfil County Borough
- List of standardised Welsh place-names in Monmouthshire
- List of standardised Welsh place-names in Neath Port Talbot
- List of standardised Welsh place-names in Newport
- List of standardised Welsh place-names in Pembrokeshire
- List of standardised Welsh place-names in Powys
- List of standardised Welsh place-names in Rhondda Cynon Taf
- List of standardised Welsh place-names in Swansea
- List of standardised Welsh place-names in Torfaen
- List of standardised Welsh place-names in the Vale of Glamorgan
- List of standardised Welsh place-names in Wrexham County Borough

== Applications ==
The Commissioner only recommends what place-names can be standardised, local authorities hold the responsibility to update signage.

- 2021 – Ceredigion County Council considered the recommendations.
- 2023 – Following the complaint over the lack of a Welsh name for Devauden, Monmouthshire County Council stated they had followed the Commissioner's list which recommended Devauden in both Welsh and English.

In 2018, the recommendations for Pembrokeshire attracted local criticism, while the Welsh name change of Barmouth, from Abermaw / Y Bermo to Abermo was criticised by a local historian.

In 2023, a similar list was complied for lakes in Snowdonia (Eryri), and approved by Eryri National Park Authority.

== See also ==
- List of standardised Welsh lake names in Snowdonia
