= Copyright status of government works =

The copyright status of government works varies around the world. Here are some examples:

== Australia ==
In Australia, government works are subject to Crown copyright, which expires after 50 years.

== Canada ==
In Canada, government works are subject to Crown copyright, which expires after 50 years.

== India ==
In India, government works are copyrighted, but many data and datasets are released under the Government Open Data License – India (GODL-India) for reuse.

== Indonesia ==
In Indonesia, government works are public domain.

== Philippines ==
In the Philippines, government works of any level are public domain.

== United Kingdom ==
In the United Kingdom, government works are subject to Crown copyright, which expires after 50 years. However, the UK government applies the Open Government Licence to many, but not all works.

== United States ==
In the United States, works of the federal government are public domain. However, the status of the works of state, local, DC, or territorial governments is varied.
