= Pandy Tudur =

Village in Conwy County Borough, Wales

Coordinates: 53.163°N 3.709°W

Pandy Tudur: Welsh: Pandytudur
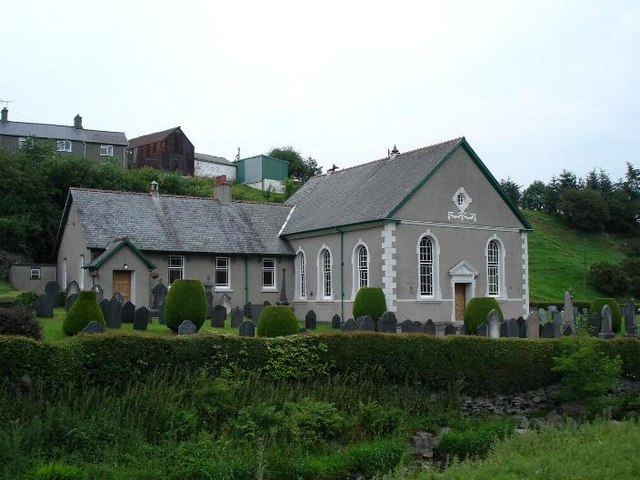
- Pandy Tudur church

- Location within Conwy
- OS grid reference: SH857642
- Community: Llangernyw
- Principal area: Conwy
- Country: Wales
- Sovereign state: United Kingdom
- Post town: ABERGELE
- Postcode district: LL22
- Dialling code: 01745
- Police: North Wales
- Fire: North Wales
- Ambulance: Welsh
- UK Parliament: Bangor Aberconwy
- Senedd Cymru – Welsh Parliament: Clwyd West

Pandy Tudur (Standardised Welsh: Pandytudur) is a village in Conwy county borough, in the north-west of Wales. It lies 5 miles northeast of Llanrwst.

== Origins of the name ==
The name was originally Pandybudr, from the Welsh pandy ('fulling mill') and budr ('dirty'). The meaning 'dirty fulling-mill' was considered unattractive and the adjective budr was replaced in Victorian times by the personal name Tudur, thus giving Pandytudur (supposedly 'Tudur's fulling mill').

In its list of standardised Welsh place-names in Conwy County Borough, the Welsh Language Commissioner recommends the use of Pandytudur in both English and Welsh. While Conwy County Borough Council has used "Pandy Tudur".

== Language ==
At the time of the 2001 UK Census, 55.5% of the population spoke the Welsh language. The highest percentage of speakers was within the 5-9 age group, where 71.1% could speak the language. Children in the village mostly attend a small Welsh-medium primary school in the nearby village of Llangernyw.

== Facilities ==
The village has a chapel of the Presbyterian Church of Wales.

Nearby lie the turbines of Moel Maelogan wind farm.
