= List of places in Rhondda Cynon Taf (categorised) =

This is a categorised list of places in Rhondda Cynon Taf County Borough, south Wales.

== Administrative divisions ==
=== Electoral wards ===
A list of electoral wards in Rhondda Cynon Taf since 1995 (2022 where indicated):

- Aberaman ^{22}
- Abercynon
- Aberdare East
- Aberdare West and Llwydcoed ^{n22}
- Beddau and Tyn-y-nant ^{22}
- Brynna and Llanharan ^{22}
- Church Village
- Cilfynydd
- Cwm Clydach
- Cwmbach
- Cymer ^{n22}
- Ferndale and Maerdy
- Gilfach Goch
- Glyn-coch ^{n22}
- Graig and Pontypridd West ^{22}
- Hawthorn and Lower Rhydfelen ^{22}
- Hirwaun, Penderyn and Rhigos ^{22}
- Llanharry
- Llantrisant and Talbot Green ^{22}
- Llantwit Fardre
- Llwyn-y-pia ^{n22}
- Mountain Ash ^{22}
- Penrhiw-ceibr ^{n22}
- Pentre
- Pen-y-graig
- Pen-y-waun
- Pontyclun Central ^{22}
- Pontyclun East ^{22}
- Pontyclun West ^{22}
- Pontypridd Town
- Porth
- Rhydfelen Central ^{22}
- Taffs Well
- Ton-teg ^{n22}
- Tonypandy
- Tonyrefail East
- Tonyrefail West
- Trallwng
- Trealaw
- Treforest
- Treherbert
- Treorchy
- Tylorstown and Ynyshir ^{22}
- Upper Rhydfelen and Glyn-Taf ^{22}
- Ynysybwl
- Ystrad

^{22} = new ward as of May 2022
^{n22} = new ward name as of May 2022

=== Communities ===
This is a list of local government communities (since the creation of Rhondda Cynon Taf unless otherwise indicated):

- Aberaman (to 30 November 2016)
- Aberaman North (from 1 December 2016)
- Aberaman South (from 1 December 2016)
- Abercynon
- Aberdare (till 30 November 2016)
- Aberdare East (from 1 December 2016)
- Aberdare West (from 1 December 2016)
- Cwm Clydach
- Cwmbach
- Cymmer
- Ferndale
- Gilfach Goch
- Hirwaun
- Llanharan
- Llanharry
- Llantrisant
- Llantwit Fardre
- Llwydcoed
- Llwynypïa
- Maerdy
- Mountain Ash (to 30 November 2016)
- Mountain Ash East (from 1 December 2016)
- Mountain Ash West (from 1 December 2016)
- Pen-y-graig
- Penrhiwceiber
- Pentre
- Penywaun
- Pont-y-clun
- Pontypridd
- Porth
- Rhigos
- Taff's Well
- Tonypandy
- Tonyrefail
- Trealaw
- Trehafod
- Treherbert
- Treorchy
- Tylorstown
- Ynyshir
- Ynysybwl and Coed-y-Cwm
- Ystrad

== See also ==
- Lists of places in Wales
