= Road signs in Wales =

Signage in a country of the United Kingdom

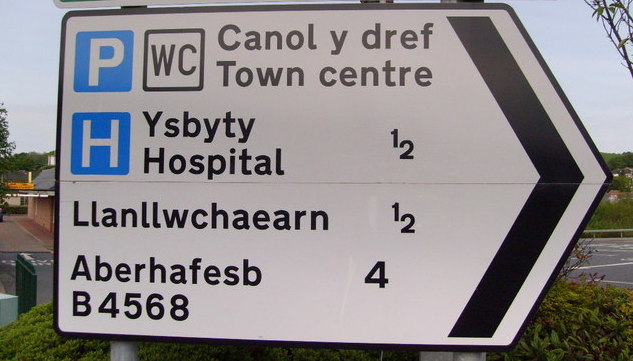
A Welsh-English bilingual sign in Newtown, Powys. Distances in miles.

Road signs in Wales follow the same design principles as those in other parts of the United Kingdom. All modern signs feature both Welsh- and English-language wording, with Welsh-first signage present in most areas of Wales and mandated for all new signs from 31 March 2016, though some English-first signage remains in some areas from when it was legally allowed before 2016.

== Current policy ==
The Welsh Language (Wales) Measure 2011 set out regulations that came into force on 31 March 2016 that now mandates that all signs be in Welsh first, with the existing "English-priority" signage (in those areas where the local authority previously had such a policy) being replaced whenever they otherwise would (life expiry or altered road conditions). The Welsh Government states in its Welsh Language Standards, Article 119, page 17, that; 'Where a sign contains the Welsh language as well as the English language, the Welsh language text must be positioned so as to be read first.' and; 'Replacement signage on Welsh Government trunk roads will be taken forward as part of general rolling programme of renewals with priority given to main routes.' The previous Welsh Language Scheme stated that English-only signs would be made bilingual when they were replaced, and that the order in which the languages appear would follow the practice adopted by the local authority where the sign is located.

== Bilingual signing ==
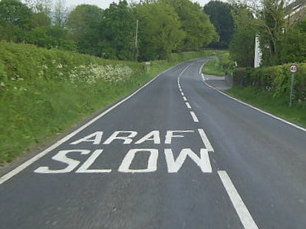
Bilingual markings on the B4302 near Manordeilo and Salem.

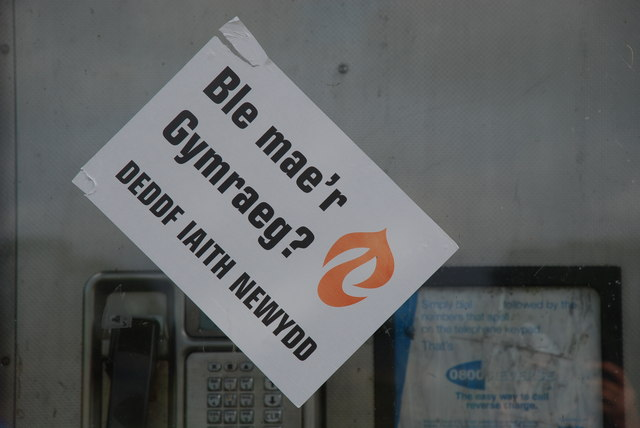
An example of a "Ble mae'r Gymraeg?" campaign sticker on a telephone box at Llangybi, Gwynedd, which translates as Where's the Welsh? New Language Act

Bilingual signs in Wales were permitted by special authorisation after 1965. In 1972 the Bowen Committee recommended that they should be provided systematically throughout Wales. Throughout Wales, instructions for drivers appear on the road itself. One of the most common painted instructions is araf – slow.

=== Controversies and campaigns ===
The Welsh-language pressure group Cymdeithas yr Iaith Gymraeg have been campaigning for a number of years with the Ble mae'r Gymraeg? (Where's the Welsh?) scheme, which campaigns both Welsh and English information on public information signs. The campaign is most noted for its placement of stickers with the group's logo, a dragon's tongue, on signposts that are written only in English.

In an overwhelmingly English-speaking area of Monmouthshire, bilingual village name signs at Rockfield and Cross Ash were removed in 2011 after complaints from local residents, as the given Welsh names are neither in common usage by Welsh speakers nor close derivatives of the English names.

=== Errors ===
The requirement for bilingual signs has sometimes led to errors, such as the two languages presenting differing information. In 2006, a bilingual pedestrian sign in Cardiff told pedestrians to "look right" in English, but "edrychwch i'r chwith" ("look left") in Welsh. In 2008, a sign erected near the entrance to a supermarket in Swansea was mistakenly printed with an automatic e-mail response which read "Nid wyf yn y swyddfa ar hyn o bryd. Anfonwch unrhyw waith i'w gyfieithu" which translates as "I am not in the office at the moment. Send any work to be translated."

== See also ==
- Welsh Government
- List of Welsh principal areas by percentage Welsh language
- List of standardised Welsh place-names – Includes guidance on what name local authorities should use.
