= Pentlepoir =

Village in Pembrokeshire, Wales

Coordinates: 51.7213°N 4.7295°W

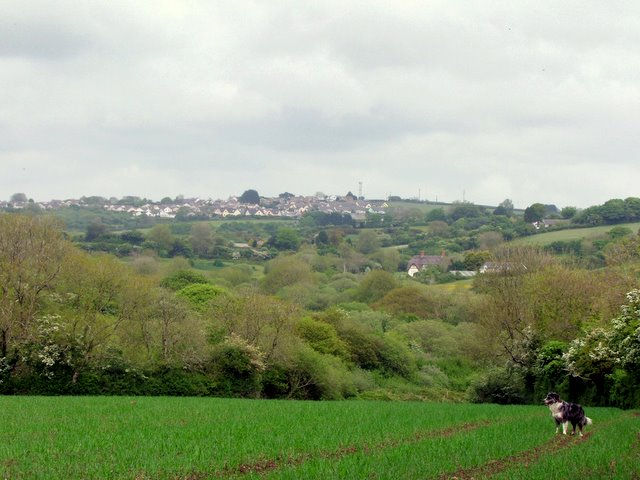

- Location within Pembrokeshire
- Population: 1,540 (2001)
- Community: East Williamston
- Principal area: Pembrokeshire
- Preserved county: Dyfed
- Country: Wales
- Sovereign state: United Kingdom
- Post town: SAUNDERSFOOT
- Postcode district: SA69
- Dialling code: 01834
- Police: Dyfed-Powys
- Fire: Mid and West Wales
- Ambulance: Welsh

Pentlepoir is a village in Pembrokeshire, Wales, approximately 3/4 mile (1.2 km) south of Kilgetty and 1 mile (1.6 km) west of Saundersfoot. The A478 passes through the village.

== Governance ==
The village is part of the East Williamston community. A 2007 review recommended dividing the community into two wards, one of which is designated as the Pentlepoir ward. The review noted that over 180 new residential buildings were built between 1987 and 2007 in Pentlepoir and Wooden, comprising 3 out of every 4 new residential building in the community over the period.

== Demographics ==
At the 2001 census, the population of Pentlepoir along with the adjacent hamlet of Wooden was 1540. In 2011 it was at least 1,200.

== Education ==
A school was present in the village from 1877 until August 2007. Following the closure of the school, primary school pupils instead attend the primary school in nearby Stepaside.
