= East Williamston =

Village and community in Pembrokeshire, Wales

- Location within Pembrokeshire
- Population: 1,844 (2011)
- OS grid reference: SN097050
- Principal area: Pembrokeshire
- Country: Wales
- Sovereign state: United Kingdom
- Post town: KILGETTY
- Postcode district: SA68
- Post town: SAUNDERSFOOT
- Postcode district: SA69
- Post town: TENBY
- Postcode district: SA70
- Police: Dyfed-Powys
- Fire: Mid and West Wales
- Ambulance: Welsh
- UK Parliament: Mid and South Pembrokeshire
- Senedd Cymru – Welsh Parliament: Ceredigion Penfro
- List of places UK Wales Pembrokeshire 51.71°N 4.75°W Map of the community

East Williamston (Welsh: Tregwilym Ddwyrain) is a village and community in Pembrokeshire, Wales. The community includes the villages of Pentlepoir, Cold Inn and Broadmoor, Wooden and Moreton. The community had a population of 1,787 in 2001, increasing to 1,844 at the 2011 Census.

== Governance ==
With the community of Jeffreyston, it makes up the Pembrokeshire electoral ward of East Williamston, which had a population of 2,327 in 2001, with 11 per cent Welsh speakers. The ward population had increased to 2,418 at the 2011 Census.

== Worship ==
It was originally a chapelry of the parish of Begelly.

== Demography ==
Its census populations were: 341 (1801), 551 (1851), 397 (1901), 387 (1951), 473 (1981).

The percentage of Welsh speakers was 5% cent (1891), 12% (1931), 3% (1971), 11% (2011).

== Education ==
The nearest schools are S t Oswalds VC School, Sageston CP School, Ysgol Greenhill School, Ysgol Glan y Môr, Ysgol y Preseli and Ysgol Gyfun Gymraeg Bro Myrddin.
