= Cold Inn =

Village in Pembrokeshire, Wales

Coordinates: 51.72°N 4.75°W

- Location within Pembrokeshire
- OS grid reference: SN100054
- Community: East Williamston
- Principal area: Pembrokeshire
- Country: Wales
- Sovereign state: United Kingdom
- Police: Dyfed-Powys
- Fire: Mid and West Wales
- Ambulance: Welsh

Cold Inn is a small village in the Welsh county of Pembrokeshire and community of East Williamston, close to the A477 road which runs between St Clears and Johnston.

== History ==
Tradition has it that the name came from a public house which may have been situated near the modern day Lovespoon Cottage. Other variables on the name are Gould Inn or Gold End/Cold End, one source states it may have been known as "Call Inn"; however, an early map by Thomas Kitchin in 1755 shows it was known as New Inn. This former coach road would have been busy with passing travellers, being the main route to Pembroke Dock before the construction of Thomas Telford's turnpike road around 1839. Around 1700 land in the village was owned by the Picton Castle and Lawrenny Park estates who leased it to the tenants, not only for agriculture but for the exploitation of the anthracite coal seams.

A pre-1850 parish map shows the name Cold Inn.

A local legend refers to the HANGING FIELD at the Cold Inn/Clayford road junction where some people who were searching for a location to sink a shaft for coal, came upon some buried bones, traditionally murderers were hung at a crossroads nearest to their home and presumably this is the root of the story. The death and burial provided the inspiration for the fictional work Cold Inn: A Novel, written by Mark Fox and published by Spirit and Sage in October 2020. Based around the village and chapel, the book explores themes at the interface of folklore, mythology, spirituality and religion.

In 1908 most of the Picton Estate land in this area was sold at an auction at Narberth. This was followed in 1910 by a further sale at the same venue of the remnants of the East Wiliamston estate.

Cold Inn lies a mile outside the Pembrokeshire Coast National Park and is around 60 metres (200 ft) above sea level. It is situated between the villages of Broadmoor and East Williamston near to Saundersfoot. Although there are now ten or so houses, until the 1950s there were only Cold Inn Farm, and Cold Inn Cottage. There are more houses on Clayford Road and Ebenezer Baptist Chapel (1861) lies to the east on the Cold Inn Cross to Templebar road. A former small stone building which was also a butcher's/slaughter house was part of the original heart of the hamlet. it was situated next to Cold Inn Cottage on the East Williamston road. This old slaughterhouse was demolished around 2006 to construct a new dwelling. The two old cottages were home to several colliers families who worked at nearby anthracite mines, and locally they burnt on the domestic fire 'culm' - a mixture of anthracite coal dust and clay formed into balls.

The coal mining industry has long since gone from the area. Coal seams used to outcrop in this area and many old sites to extract this, used to pepper the area but were of small scale. It is now an area with its fair share of holiday caravan sites nearby.

== Chapel ==
Ebenezer English Baptist Chapel was built in 1861.
