= Lists of places in Wales =

Flag of Wales.

These are lists of places in Wales.

== National lists ==
- List of built-up areas in Wales by population
- List of cities in Wales
- List of towns in Wales
- Welsh placenames

=== Political ===
- List of communities in Wales
- List of electoral wards in Wales

== Lists of places within principal areas ==
- List of places in Anglesey
- List of places in Anglesey (categorised)
- List of places in Blaenau Gwent
- List of places in Bridgend County Borough
- List of places in Caerphilly County Borough
- List of places in Cardiff - for villages and districts see Category:Populated places in Cardiff.
- List of places in Carmarthenshire
- List of places in Carmarthenshire (categorised)
- List of places in Ceredigion
- List of places in Conwy County Borough
- List of places in Conwy County Borough (categorised)
- List of places in Denbighshire
- List of places in Denbighshire (categorised)
- List of places in Flintshire
- List of places in Flintshire (categorised)
- List of places in Gwynedd
- List of places in Gwynedd (categorised)
- List of places in Merthyr Tydfil County Borough
- List of places in Monmouthshire
- List of places in Neath Port Talbot
- List of places in Neath Port Talbot (categorised)
- List of places in Newport
- List of places in Pembrokeshire
- List of places in Pembrokeshire (categorised)
- List of places in Powys
- List of places in Powys (categorised)
- List of places in Rhondda Cynon Taf
- List of places in Rhondda Cynon Taf (categorised)
- List of places in Swansea
- List of places in Swansea (categorised)
- List of places in Torfaen
- List of places in the Vale of Glamorgan
- List of places in Wrexham County Borough

== See also ==
- British toponymy
- List of generic forms in British place names
- Subdivisions of the United Kingdom
- List of cities in the United Kingdom
- List of United Kingdom locations
