= List of towns in Wales =

Map of some cities and towns in Wales.

In Wales, as in England and Northern Ireland, a town is any settlement which has received a charter of incorporation, more commonly known as a town charter, approved by the monarch. Fifty-five boroughs in Wales were given parliamentary representation in 1536, but the Municipal Corporations Act 1835 recognised only 20 Welsh boroughs. Subsequent urban growth led to the designation of other places as boroughs, including Wrexham, Rhondda, Barry and Merthyr Tydfil, but many other settlements were only granted the status of urban district. The Local Government Act 1972 allows civil parishes in England and Wales to resolve themselves to be town councils.

Cities listed are annotated as "(city)". Until the 16th century, a town was recognised as a city if it had a diocesan cathedral within its limits. The city of St Davids, with a population of about 2,000, received its city status in this way. St Asaph acquired city status in 2012 as part of the Diamond Jubilee of Queen Elizabeth II.

== A ==
- Aberaeron
- Aberavon
- Aberbargoed
- Abercarn
- Aberdare
- Abergavenny
- Abergele
- Abersychan
- Abertillery
- Aberystwyth
- Amlwch
- Ammanford

== B ==
- Bala
- Bangor (city)
- Bargoed
- Barmouth
- Barry
- Beaumaris
- Bedwas
- Bethesda
- Blaenau Ffestiniog
- Blaenavon
- Blackwood
- Blaina
- Brecon
- Bridgend
- Briton Ferry
- Brynmawr
- Buckley
- Builth Wells
- Burry Port

== C ==
- Caerleon
- Caernarfon
- Caerphilly
- Caerwys
- Caldicot
- Cardiff (city)
- Cardigan
- Carmarthen
- Chepstow
- Chirk
- Colwyn Bay
- Connah's Quay
- Conwy
- Corwen
- Cowbridge
- Criccieth
- Crickhowell
- Crumlin
- Cwmbran

== D ==
- Deganwy
- Denbigh
- Dolgellau

== E ==
- Ebbw Vale

== F ==
- Ferndale
- Fishguard
- Flint

== G ==
- Gelligaer
- Glynneath
- Goodwick
- Gorseinon

== H ==
- Harlech
- Haverfordwest
- Hay-on-Wye
- Holyhead
- Holywell

== K ==
- Kidwelly
- Knighton

== L ==
- Lampeter
- Laugharne
- Llandeilo
- Llandovery
- Llandrindod Wells
- Llandudno
- Llandudno Junction
- Llandysul
- Llanelli
- Llanfair Caereinion
- Llanfairfechan
- Llanfyllin
- Llangefni
- Llangollen
- Llanidloes
- Llanrwst
- Llantrisant
- Llantwit Major
- Llanwrtyd Wells
- Llanybydder
- Loughor

== M ==
- Machynlleth
- Maesteg
- Menai Bridge
- Merthyr Tydfil
- Milford Haven
- Mold
- Monmouth
- Montgomery
- Mountain Ash

== N ==
- Narberth
- Neath
- Nefyn
- Newbridge
- Newcastle Emlyn
- Newport (city)
- Newport, Pembrokeshire
- New Quay
- Newtown
- New Tredegar
- Neyland

== O ==
- Overton-on-Dee

== P ==
- Pembroke
- Pembroke Dock
- Penarth
- Pencoed
- Penmaenmawr
- Penrhyn Bay
- Penrhyndeudraeth
- Pontardawe
- Pontarddulais
- Pontyclun
- Pontypool
- Pontypridd
- Port Talbot
- Porth
- Porthcawl
- Porthmadog
- Prestatyn
- Presteigne
- Pwllheli

== Q ==
- Queensferry

== R ==
- Rhayader
- Rhuddlan
- Rhyl
- Rhymney
- Risca
- Ruthin

== S ==
- St Asaph (city)
- St Clears
- St David's (city)
- Saltney
- Shotton
- Swansea (city)

== T ==
- Talbot Green
- Talgarth
- Tenby
- Tonypandy
- Tredegar
- Tregaron
- Treharris
- Treorchy
- Tywyn

== U ==
- Usk

== W ==
- Welshpool
- Whitland
- Wrexham (city)

== Y ==
- Ystradgynlais
- Ystrad Mynach

== See also ==
- List of cities in Wales
- List of built-up areas in Wales by population
- Welsh place names in other countries
- List of standardised Welsh place-names
