= Welsh Language Commissioner =

Welsh Government body for the Welsh language

- Comisiynydd y Gymraeg
- Formation: 2012
- Headquarters: Caernarfon
- Official language: Welsh
- Welsh Language Commissioner: Lowri Williams (acting)
- Parent organisation: Welsh Government
- Staff: 39.2 FTEs (2024-25)
- Website: https://www.welshlanguagecommissioner.wales

The Welsh Language Commissioner (Welsh: Comisiynydd y Gymraeg) is a Welsh Government officer, overseeing an independent advisory body of the same name. The position was created following the passing of the Welsh Language (Wales) Measure 2011, effective on 1 April 2012, replacing the Welsh Language Board, with the aim of promoting and facilitating the use of the Welsh language. This entails raising awareness of the official status of the Welsh language in Wales and by imposing standards on organisations. This, in turn, will lead to the establishment of rights for Welsh speakers.

According to the commissioner's website, there are two principles that underpin the work of the commissioner, namely:

- Welsh should not be treated less favourably than the English language in Wales
- People should be able to live their lives in Wales through the medium of Welsh if they so wish.

The commissioner's work is politically independent, and the position of a commissioner lasts seven years.

== The commissioner's role ==
The commissioner may do anything they consider appropriate to:

- Promote the use of Welsh
- Facilitate the use of Welsh
- Work towards ensuring that Welsh is treated no less favourably than English.

This includes promoting opportunities to use Welsh and encourage best practice in the use of Welsh by people dealing with other persons, or providing services to other persons. Areas of their work also include legal issues, preparing and publishing reports, research, educational activities and written recommendations to ministers of the Government of Wales. The commissioner can also give advice to people.

== Commissioners ==
- Meri Huws (2012–2019)
- Aled Roberts (2019–2022)
- cy:Efa Gruffudd Jones (2023–2026)

=== Deputy commissioner ===
- Osian Llywelyn (–2026)
- Lowri Williams (2026–present)

== Criticism ==
In 2025 Cymdeithas yr Iaith criticised the Welsh Language Commission for adopting a Strategic Plan which placed less emphasis on language rights. They pointed out that the number of complaints investigated had halved, from 63% in 2021-22 to only 26% in 2024-25.

== See also ==
- National Assembly for Wales (Official Languages) Act 2012
- List of standardised Welsh place-names
- Bòrd na Gàidhlig
- The North/South Language Body
  - An Coimisinéir Teanga
  - Ulster-Scots Agency
