= Housing and construction in Wales =

House prices increased in Wales during the Housing market crisis in the United Kingdom (2008). There has been political debate that this has contributed to a decline in the number of speakers of the Welsh language.

== Building ==
Redrow plc is one of the largest Welsh housebuilders with a network of 14 operational divisions across the UK.

JCB has a factory and shop in Wrexham which recently recruited 20 new workers.

== Property market ==
Much of the rural Welsh property market was driven by buyers looking for second homes for use as holiday homes, or for retirement. Many buyers were drawn to Wales from England because of relatively inexpensive house prices in Wales as compared to house prices in England. The rise in home prices outpaced the average earnings income in Wales and meant that many local people could not afford to purchase their first home.

In 2001 nearly a third of all properties in Gwynedd were bought by buyers from out of the county, and with some communities reporting as many as a third of local homes used as holiday homes. Holiday home owners spend less than six months of the year in the local community.

=== Influence of the property market on Welsh language ===
The issue of locals being priced out of the local housing market is common to many rural communities throughout Britain, but in Wales the added dimension of language further complicated the issue, as many new residents did not learn the Welsh language, and in 1996 there had been large protests, backed by Cymdeithas yr Iaith Gymraeg, against the construction of 800 houses at Morfa Bychan near Porthmadog.

=== Political action against second-home ownership ===
Concerned for the Welsh language under these pressures, Glyn said "Once you have more than 50% of anybody living in a community that speaks a foreign language, then you lose your indigenous tongue almost immediately".

Plaid Cymru had long advocated controls on second homes, and a 2001 task force headed by Dafydd Wigley recommended land should be allocated for affordable local housing, and called for grants for locals to buy houses, and recommended council tax on holiday homes should double, following similar measures in the Scottish Highlands.

However the Welsh Labour-Liberal Democrat Assembly coalition rebuffed these proposals, with Assembly housing spokesman Peter Black stating that "we [can not] frame our planning laws around the Welsh language", adding "Nor can we take punitive measures against second home owners in the way that they propose as these will have an impact on the value of the homes of local people".

By autumn 2001 the Exmoor National Park authority in England began consideration to limit second home ownership there which was also driving up local housing prices by as much as 31%. Elfyn Llwyd, Plaid Cymru's Parliamentary Group Leader, said that the issues in Exmoor National Park were the same as in Wales, however in Wales there is the added dimension of language and culture.

Reflecting on the controversy Glyn's comments caused earlier in the year, Llwyd observed "What is interesting is of course it is fine for Exmoor to defend their community but in Wales when you try to say these things it is called racist..."

Llwyd called on other parties to join in a debate to bring the Exmoor experience to Wales when he said "... I really do ask them and I plead with them to come around the table and talk about the Exmoor suggestion and see if we can now bring it into Wales".

By spring 2002 both the Snowdonia National Park (Welsh: Parc Cenedlaethol Eryri) and Pembrokeshire Coast National Park (Welsh: Parc Cenedlaethol Arfordir Penfro) authorities began limiting second home ownership within the parks, following the example set by Exmoor. According to planners in Snowdonia and Pembroke applicants for new homes must demonstrate a proven local need or the applicant had strong links with the area.

== See also ==
- Affordability of housing in the United Kingdom
