= List of cities in Wales =

Map of the seven cities in Wales.

Wales has seven cities as of September 2022. Bangor is Wales' oldest cathedral city, whereas St Davids is the smallest city in the United Kingdom. Cardiff is the capital city of Wales and its most-populous, followed by Swansea the second most-populous. Since 2000, Welsh towns have submitted bids to be awarded city status as part of jubilees of the reigning British monarch or for other events, such as the millennium celebrations, with Newport, St Asaph and Wrexham awarded city status through these contests. Wrexham is the newest to hold the status, being awarded it in September 2022 as part of the Platinum Jubilee Civic Honours of Queen Elizabeth II.

== List of Welsh cities ==
Name in English	Name in Welsh	Principal area (Welsh name)	Year granted or confirmed	Image	Administrative population	Urban population (2021)
Cardiff	Caerdydd	City and County of Cardiff (Dinas a Sir Caerdydd)	1905	Cardiff Castle	359,512 (county)	348,535 (built-up area)
Swansea	Abertawe	City and County of Swansea (Dinas a Sir Abertawe)	1969	Swansea Beach and The Tower, Meridian Quay	237,834 (county)	170,085 (built-up area)
Newport	Casnewydd	Newport (Casnewydd)	2002	Celtic Manor Resort	159,658 (county borough)	130,890 (built-up area)
Wrexham	Wrecsam	Wrexham County Borough (Bwrdeistref Sirol Wrecsam)	2022	Wrexham city centre (Hope Street)	135,132 (county borough)	44,785 (built-up area)
Bangor	Bangor	Gwynedd	Cathedral city since 6th century. Officially conferred in 1974	Bangor from Port Penrhyn	15,060	16,990
St Asaph	Llanelwy	Denbighshire (Sir Ddinbych)	2012	Kentigern Arms	3,485	
St Davids	Tyddewi	Pembrokeshire (Sir Benfro)	Cathedral city, officially conferred in 1994	Porth Brâg	1,348	

== City bids ==
Since 2000, Welsh towns have competed in a contest to be awarded city status, as part of civic honours in notable celebrations, like the millennium celebrations or the Jubilee of the reigning monarch. The 2000 contest was criticised for having no Welsh bid be successful.

=== Successful ===
- Newport — 2000 (lost); 2002 (won)
- St Asaph — 2000 (lost); 2002 (lost); 2012 (won)
- Wrexham — 2000 (lost); 2002 (lost); 2012 (lost); 2022 (won)

=== Unsuccessful ===
- Aberystwyth — 2000 (lost); 2002 (lost)
- Machynlleth — 2000 (lost); 2002 (lost)
- Newtown — 2000 (lost); 2002 (lost)

Merthyr Tydfil councillors voted against a proposal to bid for city status for 2022 which followed feedback.

=== Future ===
In January 2024, Llanelli Town Council announced that they would submit a bid later that year, for Llanelli to potentially get city status. In March 2024, the Llanelli Chamber of Trade and Commerce launched the campaign and bid for city status.

== Unrecognised cities ==
- Llandaff – now within the city of Cardiff since 1922, it has been described and signposted locally as the "City of Llandaff" and "a city within a city". It is informally referred to as a "city" because it was the seat of the Bishop of Llandaff, however the status is not formally recognised, nor was official city status awarded to it.

== See also ==
- List of built-up areas in Wales by population
- List of towns in Wales
- List of cathedrals in Wales
