= Open Government Licence =

UK government copyright licence

The OGL symbol

The Open Government Licence (OGL) is a copyright licence for crown copyright works published by the UK government. Other UK public sector bodies may apply it to their publications. It was developed and is maintained by The National Archives. It is compatible with the Creative Commons Attribution (CC-BY) licence.

The OGL is the default licence for crown copyright works. Local councils are also expected to license their work under the OGL under the Re-use of Public Sector Information Regulations 2015. However, many councils have not yet done so.

== History ==
Since 2001, some works of the UK government had been made available under the Click-Use Licence. This was replaced by the first version of the OGL when it was released on 30 September 2010. The OGL was developed by The National Archives.

The OGL was developed as part of the UK Government Licensing Framework, which also includes a non-commercial Government licence that restricts the commercial use of licensed content, as well as a charged licence for situations where charging for the re-use of content is deemed appropriate.

The first version was designed to work in parallel with other licences such as those released by Creative Commons, mirroring the Creative Commons Attribution (CC-BY) licence and the Open Data Commons Attribution Licence.

Version 2.0, released on 28 June 2013, is directly compatible with the Creative Commons Attribution License 4.0 and the Open Data Commons Attribution License. The OGL symbol (shown above) was also released along with this version, which "at a glance, shows that information can be used and re-used under open licensing".

Version 3.0, current as of 2025, was released on 31 October 2014. It is interoperable with Creative Commons' Attribution 4.0 licence, and an OGL-licensed work could be used in a CC-licensed work; however it should be clear that the material used is being used under the OGL and it should still be linked to the OGL.

== Licence ==
The OGL permits anyone to copy, publish, distribute, transmit and adapt the licensed work, and to exploit it both commercially and non-commercially. In return, the re-user of the licensed work has to acknowledge the source of the work and (if possible) provide a link to the OGL.

Version 3.0 of the licence carries the SPDX identifier OGL-UK-3.0. The licence is also available in machine-readable format.

== Applicability ==
The OGL applies to many but not all Crown copyright works. The works must have been expressly released under the OGL terms by the relevant rights owner or authorised information provider. The licence may also be used by other public sector bodies, such as local government, the National Health Service or the police. It may be applied to texts, media, databases and source code.

The OGL includes a list of types of information that it cannot cover. The licence states that it does not apply to:

- personal data in the Information,
- Information that has not been accessed by way of publication or disclosure under information access legislation (including the Freedom of Information Acts for the UK and Scotland) by or with the consent of the Information Provider;
- departmental or public sector organisation logos, crests and the Royal Arms except where they form an integral part of a document or dataset;
- military insignia;
- third party rights the Information Provider is not authorised to license;
- other intellectual property rights, including patents, trade marks, and design rights; and
- identity documents such as the British passport

The Ministry of Defence interpret the "personal data" restriction to mean that photographs where "at least one individual is recognisable" cannot be OGL.

=== Use ===
Use of the OGL is encouraged by the Re-use of Public Sector Information Regulations 2015, regulation 12 of which requires licences to be as non-restrictive as possible.

The OGL is used by organisations at various levels within the UK Government, including:

- Ministerial departments such as:
  - The Ministry of Defence
- Non-ministerial departments such as:
  - The National Archives
  - HM Land Registry, who make their public data available through the OGL, although as of 2013 it is reviewing the release of its "price paid data" (the records of the prices of properties that have been sold in the UK for their full market value) under the OGL and reserves the right to withdraw that data from the dataset it makes available under the OGL.
- Executive agencies such as:
  - The former Highways Agency
  - Historic England
- Local councils including:
  - Barrow-in-Furness
  - Edinburgh
  - Wyre
  - Runnymede
- Governmental projects such as:
  - Data.gov.uk
- Heritage organisations such as
  - Cadw.

The OGL is also used by the devolved governments of Wales and Scotland. The Welsh Government has made its works available under the OGL since 2016, while the Scottish Government has done so since 2015.

=== Software ===
National and local government organisations which create software are encouraged to publish the source code under the OGL. A key purpose of this is to enable civil servants and other government employees to engage more effectively with the open-source software community.

== Open Parliament Licence ==
The Parliament of the United Kingdom uses a similar "Open Parliament Licence" (OPL).

== See also ==
- Wikipedia template

{{OGL-3.0}} and the Wikimedia template
