= List of United Kingdom locations: Ff-Fn =

The United Kingdom

This is part of the list of United Kingdom locations: a gazetteer of place names in the United Kingdom showing each place's locality and geographical coordinates.

== Ff ==
Location	Locality	Coordinates (links to map & photo sources)	OS grid reference
Ffairfach	Carmarthenshire	51.87°N 04.00°W	SN6221
Ffair-Rhos	Ceredigion	52.29°N 03.84°W	SN7468
Ffaldybrenin	Carmarthenshire	52.07°N 04.00°W	SN6344
Ffarmers	Carmarthenshire	52.07°N 03.97°W	SN6544
Ffawyddog	Powys	51.85°N 03.16°W	SO2018
Ffestiniog	Gwynedd	52.95°N 03.93°W	SH7041
Fforddlas	Powys	52.03°N 03.16°W	SO2038
Ffordd-las	Denbighshire	53.16°N 03.31°W	SJ1264
Ffordd-y-Gyfraith	Bridgend	51.54°N 03.64°W	SS8684
Fforest	Carmarthenshire	51.71°N 04.05°W	SN5804
Fforest-fach	Swansea	51.63°N 03.99°W	SS6295
Fforest-Gôch	Neath Port Talbot	51.69°N 03.82°W	SN7401
Ffostrasol	Ceredigion	52.09°N 04.38°W	SN3747
Ffos-y-ffin	Ceredigion	52.21°N 04.28°W	SN4460
Ffos-y-fran	Merthyr Tydfil	51.73°N 03.36°W	SO0605
Ffos-y-go	Wrexham	53.07°N 03.04°W	SJ3054
Ffridd	Powys	52.54°N 03.25°W	SO1595
Ffrith	Wrexham	53.08°N 03.07°W	SJ2855
Ffynnon	Carmarthenshire	51.81°N 04.39°W	SN3516
Ffynnon-ddrain	Carmarthenshire	51.86°N 04.32°W	SN4021
Ffynnon Gron	Pembrokeshire	51.89°N 05.05°W	SM9026
Ffynnongroyw	Flintshire	53.32°N 03.30°W	SJ1382
Ffynnon Gynydd	Powys	52.06°N 03.22°W	SO1641

== Fi ==
=== Fia-Fio ===
Location	Locality	Coordinates (links to map & photo sources)	OS grid reference
Fiaraidh / Fiaray	Western Isles	57.06°N 07.45°W	NF697105
Fickleshole	Surrey	51.32°N 00.02°W	TQ3860
Fiddington	Somerset	51.15°N 03.13°W	ST2140
Fiddington	Gloucestershire	51.96°N 02.11°W	SO9230
Fiddington Sands	Wiltshire	51.28°N 01.98°W	SU0154
Fiddleford	Dorset	50.91°N 02.28°W	ST8013
Fiddlers' Green	Norfolk	52.52°N 01.00°E	TM0496
Fiddler's Ferry	Sefton	53.67°N 02.95°W	SD3720
Fiddler's Ferry	Cheshire	53.36°N 02.67°W	SJ5586
Fiddler's Green	Herefordshire	52.01°N 02.62°W	SO5735
Fiddler's Green	Gloucestershire	51.89°N 02.13°W	SO9122
Fiddler's Green	Aberdeenshire	57.62°N 01.93°W	NK0459
Fiddlers Hamlet	Essex	51.68°N 00.12°E	TL4701
Field	Herefordshire	52.14°N 03.02°W	SO3050
Field	Somerset	51.17°N 02.55°W	ST6142
Field	Staffordshire	52.89°N 01.97°W	SK0233
Field Assarts	Oxfordshire	51.81°N 01.55°W	SP3113
Field Broughton	Cumbria	54.22°N 02.95°W	SD3881
Field Common	Surrey	51.38°N 00.39°W	TQ1266
Field Dalling	Norfolk	52.90°N 00.97°E	TG0038
Field Green	Kent	51.03°N 00.53°E	TQ7829
Field Head	Leicestershire	52.67°N 01.27°W	SK4909
Fields End	Hertfordshire	51.75°N 00.52°W	TL0207
Field's Place	Herefordshire	52.17°N 02.86°W	SO4153
Fifehead Magdalen	Dorset	50.98°N 02.31°W	ST7821
Fifehead Neville	Dorset	50.88°N 02.34°W	ST7610
Fifehead St Quintin	Dorset	50.88°N 02.32°W	ST7710
Fife Keith	Moray	57.53°N 02.97°W	NJ4250
Fife Ness	Fife	56.27°N 02.59°W	NO632096
Fifield	Wiltshire	51.24°N 01.80°W	SU1450
Fifield	Oxfordshire	51.86°N 01.65°W	SP2418
Fifield	Berkshire	51.47°N 00.70°W	SU9076
Fifield Bavant	Wiltshire	51.02°N 01.98°W	SU0125
Figheldean	Wiltshire	51.22°N 01.78°W	SU1547
Filands	Wiltshire	51.59°N 02.10°W	ST9388
Filby	Norfolk	52.65°N 01.63°E	TG4613
Filby Heath	Norfolk	52.65°N 01.68°E	TG4913
Filchampstead	Oxfordshire	51.74°N 01.34°W	SP4505
Filey	North Yorkshire	54.20°N 00.29°W	TA1180
Filford	Dorset	50.77°N 02.79°W	SY4497
Filgrave	Milton Keynes	52.12°N 00.73°W	SP8748
Filham	Devon	50.37°N 03.91°W	SX6455
Filkins	Oxfordshire	51.73°N 01.66°W	SP2304
Filla	Shetland Islands	60.39°N 00.80°W	HU660685
Filleigh (North Devon)	Devon	51.02°N 03.91°W	SS6627
Filleigh (Mid Devon)	Devon	50.87°N 03.79°W	SS7410
Fillingham	Lincolnshire	53.35°N 00.58°W	SK9485
Fillongley	Warwickshire	52.48°N 01.58°W	SP2887
Filmore Hill	Hampshire	51.03°N 01.05°W	SU6627
Filton	City of Bristol	51.49°N 02.57°W	ST6078
Filwood Park	City of Bristol	51.41°N 02.59°W	ST5969
Fimber	East Riding of Yorkshire	54.02°N 00.64°W	SE8960
Finavon	Angus	56.70°N 02.83°W	NO4957
Fincham	Liverpool	53.42°N 02.87°W	SJ4292
Fincham	Norfolk	52.62°N 00.48°E	TF6806
Finchampstead	Berkshire	51.36°N 00.86°W	SU7963
Finchdean	Hampshire	50.90°N 00.96°W	SU7312
Finchingfield	Essex	51.96°N 00.44°E	TL6832
Finchley	Barnet	51.59°N 00.19°W	TQ2590
Fincraigs	Fife	56.38°N 03.03°W	NO3622
Findern	Derbyshire	52.86°N 01.55°W	SK3030
Findhorn	Moray	57.65°N 03.61°W	NJ0464
Findochty	Moray	57.69°N 02.90°W	NJ4668
Findo Gask	Perth and Kinross	56.36°N 03.62°W	NO0020
Findon	West Sussex	50.86°N 00.40°W	TQ1208
Findon	Aberdeenshire	57.06°N 02.11°W	NO9397
Findon Valley	West Sussex	50.84°N 00.39°W	TQ1306
Finedon	Northamptonshire	52.33°N 00.66°W	SP9172
Fine Street	Herefordshire	52.04°N 02.97°W	SO3339
Fingal Street	Suffolk	52.27°N 01.23°E	TM2169
Fingerpost	Worcestershire	52.36°N 02.39°W	SO7374
Fingest	Buckinghamshire	51.61°N 00.88°W	SU7791
Finghall	North Yorkshire	54.29°N 01.72°W	SE1889
Fingland	Cumbria	54.90°N 03.17°W	NY2557
Finglesham	Kent	51.22°N 01.33°E	TR3353
Fingringhoe	Essex	51.84°N 00.94°E	TM0320
Finham	Coventry	52.37°N 01.51°W	SP3375
Finkle Street	Sheffield	53.47°N 01.54°W	SK3098
Finmere	Oxfordshire	51.98°N 01.08°W	SP6332
Finney Green	Cheshire	53.33°N 02.22°W	SJ8582
Finney Green	Staffordshire	53.01°N 02.31°W	SJ7946
Finningham	Suffolk	52.28°N 01.01°E	TM0669
Finnygaud	Aberdeenshire	57.57°N 02.67°W	NJ6054
Finsbury	Camden	51.52°N 00.11°W	TQ3182
Finsbury Park	Islington	51.55°N 00.12°W	TQ3086
Finstall	Worcestershire	52.32°N 02.03°W	SO9870
Finsthwaite	Cumbria	54.27°N 02.98°W	SD3687
Finstock	Oxfordshire	51.84°N 01.47°W	SP3616
Finstown	Orkney Islands	59.00°N 03.13°W	HY3513
Fintry	Aberdeenshire	57.57°N 02.41°W	NJ7554
Fintry	Stirling	56.04°N 04.23°W	NS6186
Fintry	City of Dundee	56.48°N 02.95°W	NO4133
Finwood	Warwickshire	52.31°N 01.72°W	SP1968
Finzean	Aberdeenshire	57.01°N 02.66°W	NO6092
Fionnphort	Argyll and Bute	56.32°N 06.36°W	NM3023
Fionnsabhag	Western Isles	57.76°N 06.92°W	NG0786

=== Fir-Fix ===
Location	Locality	Coordinates (links to map & photo sources)	OS grid reference
Firbank	Cumbria	54.34°N 02.58°W	SD6294
Firbeck	Rotherham	53.38°N 01.15°W	SK5688
Firby (near Bedale)	North Yorkshire	54.26°N 01.60°W	SE2686
Firby (Westow)	North Yorkshire	54.08°N 00.87°W	SE7466
Fire Beacon Point	Cornwall	50.70°N 04.67°W	SX112925
Firgrove	Rochdale	53.61°N 02.12°W	SD9213
Firhill	Highland	57.69°N 04.28°W	NH6469
Firsby	Lincolnshire	53.14°N 00.16°E	TF4563
Firsdown	Wiltshire	51.09°N 01.70°W	SU2133
Firs Lane	Wigan	53.49°N 02.54°W	SD6400
First Coast	Highland	57.86°N 05.50°W	NG9291
Firswood	Trafford	53.45°N 02.28°W	SJ8195
Firth	Scottish Borders	55.49°N 02.72°W	NT5423
Firth Moor	Darlington	54.51°N 01.53°W	NZ3013
Firth Muir of Boysack	Angus	56.58°N 02.66°W	NO5944
Firth Park	Sheffield	53.41°N 01.45°W	SK3691
Fir Toll	Kent	51.16°N 00.74°E	TQ9244
Fir Tree	Durham	54.70°N 01.78°W	NZ1434
Fir Vale	Sheffield	53.40°N 01.45°W	SK3690
Firwood Fold	Bolton	53.59°N 02.40°W	SD7311
Fishbourne	Isle of Wight	50.72°N 01.22°W	SZ5592
Fishbourne	West Sussex	50.82°N 00.82°W	SU8304
Fishburn	Durham	54.68°N 01.44°W	NZ3632
Fishcross	Clackmannan	56.13°N 03.77°W	NS9095
Fisherford	Aberdeenshire	57.40°N 02.56°W	NJ6635
Fishermead	Milton Keynes	52.03°N 00.74°W	SP8638
Fisherrow	East Lothian	55.94°N 03.05°W	NT3473
Fishersgate	West Sussex	50.83°N 00.22°W	TQ2505
Fishers Green	Hertfordshire	51.91°N 00.22°W	TL2226
Fisher's Pond	Hampshire	50.97°N 01.31°W	SU4820
Fisherstreet	West Sussex	51.07°N 00.65°W	SU9431
Fisherton	Highland	57.53°N 04.10°W	NH7451
Fisherton	South Ayrshire	55.40°N 04.75°W	NS2616
Fisherton de la Mere / Fisherton Delamere	Wiltshire	51.14°N 02.00°W	SU0038
Fisherwick	Staffordshire	52.66°N 01.73°W	SK1808
Fishery	Berkshire	51.51°N 00.71°W	SU8980
Fishguard / Abergwaun	Pembrokeshire	51.99°N 04.98°W	SM9537
Fish Holm	Shetland Islands	60.44°N 01.13°W	HU476740
Fishlake	Doncaster	53.60°N 01.01°W	SE6513
Fishleigh	Devon	50.82°N 04.07°W	SS5405
Fishleigh Castle	Devon	50.82°N 04.07°W	SS5405
Fishley	Norfolk	52.64°N 01.54°E	TG4011
Fishley	Walsall	52.62°N 02.00°W	SK0003
Fishmere End	Lincolnshire	52.91°N 00.11°W	TF2737
Fishpond Bottom	Dorset	50.77°N 02.90°W	SY3698
Fishponds	City of Bristol	51.47°N 02.53°W	ST6375
Fishpool	Herefordshire	51.95°N 02.49°W	SO6629
Fishpool	North Yorkshire	53.91°N 01.65°W	SE2347
Fishpool	Bury	53.57°N 02.30°W	SD8009
Fishpools	Powys	52.30°N 03.18°W	SO1968
Fishtoft	Lincolnshire	52.95°N 00.02°E	TF3642
Fishtoft Drove	Lincolnshire	53.02°N 00.04°W	TF3149
Fishwick	Lancashire	53.75°N 02.66°W	SD5629
Fiskavaig	Highland	57.31°N 06.45°W	NG3234
Fiskerton	Nottinghamshire	53.05°N 00.91°W	SK7351
Fiskerton	Lincolnshire	53.23°N 00.44°W	TF0472
Fistard	Isle of Man	54.06°N 04.75°W	SC2067
Fitful Head	Shetland Islands	59.89°N 01.37°W	HU350124
Fitling	East Riding of Yorkshire	53.78°N 00.10°W	TA2534
Fittleton	Wiltshire	51.24°N 01.80°W	SU1449
Fittleworth	West Sussex	50.96°N 00.56°W	TQ0119
Fitton End	Cambridgeshire	52.68°N 00.09°E	TF4212
Fitton Hill	Oldham	53.51°N 02.10°W	SD9302
Fitz	Shropshire	52.74°N 02.83°W	SJ4417
Fitzhead	Somerset	51.04°N 03.27°W	ST1128
Fitzwilliam	Wakefield	53.63°N 01.38°W	SE4115
Fiunary	Highland	56.54°N 05.89°W	NM6146
Five Acres	Gloucestershire	51.80°N 02.62°W	SO5712
Five Ash Down	East Sussex	50.99°N 00.09°E	TQ4724
Five Ashes	East Sussex	51.00°N 00.20°E	TQ5525
Five Bells	Somerset	51.16°N 03.34°W	ST0642
Five Bridges	Herefordshire	52.11°N 02.51°W	SO6546
Fivecrosses	Cheshire	53.27°N 02.70°W	SJ5376
Fivehead	Somerset	50.99°N 02.92°W	ST3522
Five Houses	Isle of Wight	50.68°N 01.40°W	SZ4287
Five Lane Ends	Lancashire	53.97°N 02.76°W	SD5053
Fivelanes	Cornwall	50.59°N 04.51°W	SX2280
Five Lanes	Monmouthshire	51.60°N 02.81°W	ST4490
Five Oak Green	Kent	51.18°N 00.34°E	TQ6445
Five Oaks	West Sussex	51.04°N 00.44°W	TQ0928
Five Roads	Carmarthenshire	51.72°N 04.20°W	SN4805
Five Ways	Warwickshire	52.31°N 01.67°W	SP2269
Five Wents	Kent	51.22°N 00.59°E	TQ8150
Fixby	Kirklees	53.67°N 01.78°W	SE1420

== Fl ==
Location	Locality	Coordinates (links to map & photo sources)	OS grid reference
Flackley Ash	East Sussex	50.97°N 00.66°E	TQ8723
Flacks Green	Essex	51.79°N 00.55°E	TL7614
Flackwell Heath	Buckinghamshire	51.59°N 00.71°W	SU8989
Fladbury	Worcestershire	52.11°N 02.01°W	SO9946
Fladbury Cross	Worcestershire	52.12°N 02.01°W	SO9947
Fladdabister	Shetland Islands	60.07°N 01.22°W	HU4332
Fladday	Western Isles	58.02°N 07.09°W	NA993151
Flagg	Derbyshire	53.20°N 01.80°W	SK1368
Flaggoner's Green	Herefordshire	52.18°N 02.52°W	SO6454
Flamborough	East Riding of Yorkshire	54.11°N 00.13°W	TA2270
Flamborough Head	East Riding of Yorkshire	54.11°N 00.08°W	TA254703
Flamstead	Hertfordshire	51.81°N 00.44°W	TL0714
Flamstead End	Hertfordshire	51.70°N 00.06°W	TL3403
Flannan Isles	Western Isles	58.28°N 07.59°W	NA724467
Flansham	West Sussex	50.80°N 00.63°W	SU9601
Flanshaw	Wakefield	53.67°N 01.53°W	SE3120
Flappit Spring	Bradford	53.82°N 01.92°W	SE0536
Flasby	North Yorkshire	54.00°N 02.09°W	SD9456
Flash	Staffordshire	53.20°N 01.97°W	SK0267
Flashader	Highland	57.48°N 06.43°W	NG3452
Flatford	Suffolk	51.96°N 01.02°E	TM075333
Flat Holm	Cardiff	51.37°N 03.11°W	ST223644
Flathurst	West Sussex	50.98°N 00.60°W	SU9822
Flaunden	Hertfordshire	51.68°N 00.54°W	TL0100
Flawborough	Nottinghamshire	52.97°N 00.83°W	SK7842
Flawith	North Yorkshire	54.07°N 01.26°W	SE4865
Flax Bourton	North Somerset	51.41°N 02.72°W	ST5069
Flaxby	North Yorkshire	54.00°N 01.40°W	SE3957
Flaxholme	Derbyshire	52.97°N 01.49°W	SK3442
Flaxlands	Norfolk	52.49°N 01.09°E	TM1093
Flaxley	Gloucestershire	51.83°N 02.45°W	SO6915
Flax Moss	Lancashire	53.69°N 02.33°W	SD7822
Flaxpool	Somerset	51.10°N 03.22°W	ST1435
Flaxton	North Yorkshire	54.04°N 00.96°W	SE6862
Fleckney	Leicestershire	52.53°N 01.05°W	SP6493
Flecknoe	Warwickshire	52.26°N 01.25°W	SP5163
Fledborough	Nottinghamshire	53.23°N 00.78°W	SK8172
Fleet	Dorset	50.61°N 02.52°W	SY6380
Fleet (Hayling Island)	Hampshire	50.80°N 00.97°W	SU7201
Fleet (Hart)	Hampshire	51.27°N 00.85°W	SU8054
Fleet	Lincolnshire	52.78°N 00.04°E	TF3823
Fleet-Downs	Kent	51.43°N 00.24°E	TQ5673
Fleetend	Hampshire	50.85°N 01.29°W	SU5006
Fleet Hargate	Lincolnshire	52.79°N 00.06°E	TF3924
Fleetlands	Hampshire	50.83°N 01.17°W	SU5804
Fleets	North Yorkshire	54.03°N 02.06°W	SD9660
Fleetville	Hertfordshire	51.74°N 00.32°W	TL1607
Fleetwood	Lancashire	53.91°N 03.03°W	SD3247
Fleggburgh / Burgh St Margaret	Norfolk	52.66°N 01.60°E	TG4414
Fleming Field	Durham	54.76°N 01.41°W	NZ3841
Flemings	Kent	51.25°N 01.26°E	TR2856
Flemingston	The Vale Of Glamorgan	51.42°N 03.42°W	ST0170
Flemington (Strathaven)	South Lanarkshire	55.67°N 04.06°W	NS7044
Flemington (Cambuslang)	South Lanarkshire	55.80°N 04.15°W	NS6559
Flempton	Suffolk	52.28°N 00.65°E	TL8169
Fleoideabhagh	Western Isles	57.78°N 06.89°W	NG0988
Flesherin	Western Isles	58.24°N 06.17°W	NB5536
Fletchersbridge	Cornwall	50.45°N 04.67°W	SX1065
Fletcher's Green	Kent	51.22°N 00.19°E	TQ5350
Fletchertown	Cumbria	54.76°N 03.24°W	NY2042
Fletching	East Sussex	50.98°N 00.02°E	TQ4223
Fletching Common	East Sussex	50.98°N 00.01°E	TQ4122
Fleuchary	Highland	57.89°N 04.11°W	NH7591
Fleur-de-lis	Caerphilly	51.65°N 03.23°W	ST1596
Flexbury	Cornwall	50.83°N 04.54°W	SS2107
Flexford	Hampshire	50.98°N 01.40°W	SU4221
Flexford	Surrey	51.24°N 00.68°W	SU9250
Flimby	Cumbria	54.68°N 03.52°W	NY0233
Flimwell	East Sussex	51.05°N 00.43°E	TQ7131
Flint / Y Fflint	Flintshire	53.23°N 03.14°W	SJ2472
Flint Cross	Cambridgeshire	52.05°N 00.04°E	TL4042
Flintham	Nottinghamshire	53.00°N 00.89°W	SK7446
Flint Hill	Durham	54.88°N 01.75°W	NZ1654
Flint Mountain	Flintshire	53.22°N 03.13°W	SJ2470
Flinton	East Riding of Yorkshire	53.81°N 00.14°W	TA2236
Flint's Green	Solihull	52.41°N 01.61°W	SP2680
Flintsham	Herefordshire	52.21°N 03.01°W	SO3158
Flishinghurst	Kent	51.10°N 00.49°E	TQ7537
Flitcham	Norfolk	52.80°N 00.55°E	TF7226
Flitholme	Cumbria	54.53°N 02.37°W	NY7615
Flitton	Bedfordshire	52.00°N 00.47°W	TL0535
Flitwick	Bedfordshire	51.99°N 00.50°W	TL0334
Flixborough	North Lincolnshire	53.62°N 00.68°W	SE8715
Flixborough Stather	North Lincolnshire	53.61°N 00.70°W	SE8614
Flixton	North Yorkshire	54.19°N 00.42°W	TA0379
Flixton	Suffolk	52.42°N 01.39°E	TM3186
Flixton	Trafford	53.44°N 02.39°W	SJ7494
Flockton	Kirklees	53.63°N 01.63°W	SE2415
Flockton Green	Kirklees	53.63°N 01.63°W	SE2415
Flockton Moor	Kirklees	53.62°N 01.66°W	SE2214
Flodaigh (inner Loch Ròg, Lewis)	Western Isles	58.19°N 06.93°W	NB104334
Flodaigh (outer Loch Ròg, Lewis)	Western Isles	58.26°N 06.91°W	NB122414
Flodda (Benbecula)	Western Isles	57.47°N 07.26°W	NF843551
Flodday (near Vatersay, Barra)	Western Isles	56.89°N 07.57°W	NL610923
Flodday (Loch Maddy, North Uist)	Western Isles	57.60°N 07.12°W	NF940692
Flodday (Sound of Barra)	Western Isles	56.99°N 07.34°W	NF754022
Floddaybeg (North Uist)	Western Isles	57.50°N 07.14°W	NF918577
Flodaigh Mòr (North Uist)	Western Isles	57.49°N 07.15°W	NF914568
Flodigarry	Highland	57.65°N 06.26°W	NG4671
Floodgates	Herefordshire	52.20°N 03.05°W	SO2857
Flood's Ferry	Cambridgeshire	52.51°N 00.01°W	TL3593
Flood Street	Hampshire	50.95°N 01.80°W	SU1417
Flookburgh	Cumbria	54.16°N 02.98°W	SD3675
Flordon	Norfolk	52.52°N 01.21°E	TM1897
Flore	Northamptonshire	52.23°N 01.06°W	SP6460
Florence	City of Stoke-on-Trent	52.97°N 02.13°W	SJ9142
Flotta	Shetland Islands	60.19°N 01.32°W	HU374462
Flotta	Orkney Islands	58.82°N 03.11°W	ND355936
Flowers Bottom	Buckinghamshire	51.68°N 00.80°W	SU8399
Flowers Green	East Sussex	50.87°N 00.31°E	TQ6311
Flowery Field	Tameside	53.45°N 02.09°W	SJ9495
Flowton	Suffolk	52.07°N 01.03°E	TM0846
Fluchter	East Dunbartonshire	55.93°N 04.27°W	NS5874
Flugarth	Shetland Islands	60.34°N 01.16°W	HU4663
Flukes Hole	Shetland Islands	60.49°N 01.16°W	HU4679
Flushdyke	Wakefield	53.68°N 01.57°W	SE2821
Flush House	Kirklees	53.55°N 01.83°W	SE1107
Flushing (St Anthony-in-Meneage)	Cornwall	50.08°N 05.10°W	SW7825
Flushing (near Falmouth)	Cornwall	50.15°N 05.08°W	SW8033
Flushing	Aberdeenshire	57.50°N 01.91°W	NK0546
Fluxton	Devon	50.72°N 03.30°W	SY0892
Flyford Flavell	Worcestershire	52.18°N 02.03°W	SO9854
