= Fisherton =

Fisherton may refer to:

- Fisherton, Highland, a coastal hamlet near Inverness, Scotland.
- Fisherton, South Ayrshire, a location in Scotland
- Fisherton Anger, Wiltshire, England, now part of Salisbury
- Fisherton Street in Wiltshire, England
- Fisherton Delamere, Wiltshire, England
- Barrio Fisherton, an Argentine neighbourhood in Rosario, Santa Fe

== See also ==
- Fisherton Station (disambiguation)
- Fishertown, Pennsylvania
- Fiskerton (disambiguation)
