= Ben Parcell =

English singer-songwriter

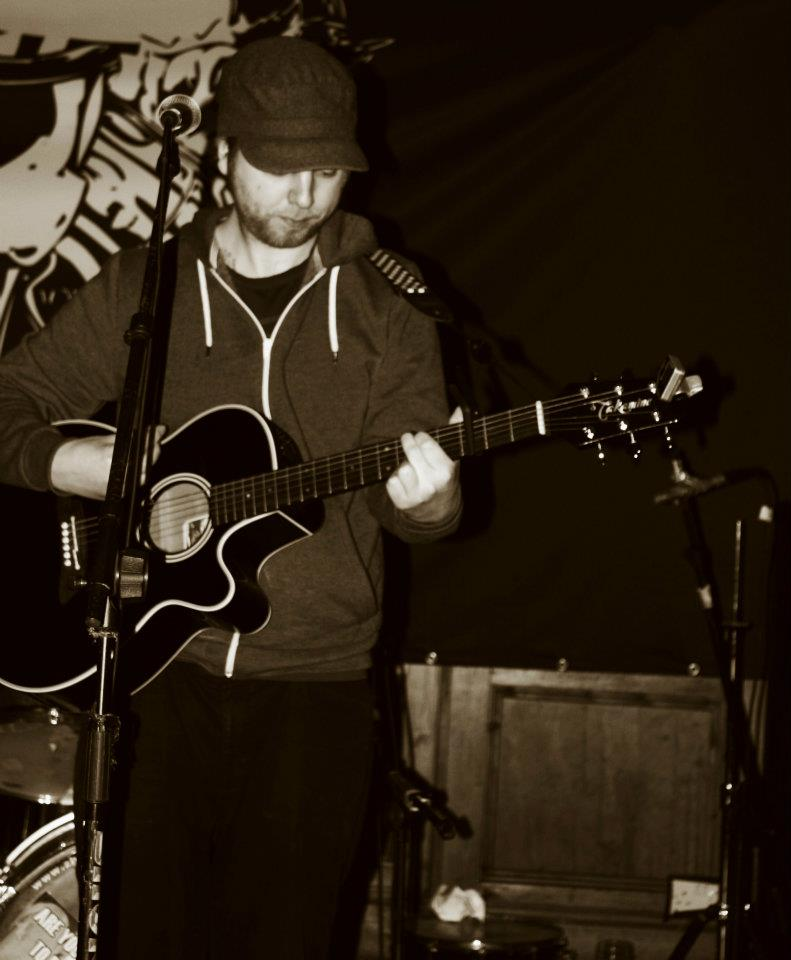

Background information
- Born: 28 November 1982 (age 43)
- Origin: Bridlington, East Riding of Yorkshire, England
- Genres: Folk, pop, pop folk, acoustic music
- Occupations: Singer-songwriter, producer
- Instruments: Guitar, vocals, bass, mandolin, drums, keyboard
- Years active: 2002–present
- Labels: In at the Eye Records, By The Sea
- Website: www.benparcell.com

Ben Parcell is an English singer songwriter, born and residing in Bridlington, East Riding of Yorkshire. Since going solo in 2010 he has played over 300 shows around the UK supporting several established acts including Chris Helme, Alice Gold and Ben Marwood including appearing on BBC Introducing and having a music video placed on rotation on UK Digital TV.

== Musical career ==
Parcell is a multi-instrumentalist proficient in vocals, electric and acoustic guitar, mandolin, bass, keyboards and drums, and has performed in bands since 2002. He was the lead singer and guitarist of pop punk band 'The Trailers' from between 2002–2005.

Parcell currently performs as a solo performer with acoustic guitar and vocals. He has supported several established artists on tour dates: Chris Helme of The Seahorses, Mark Morriss of The Bluetones, Ben Marwood, Alice Gold, Ryan Spendlove, Blair Dunlop, Edwina Hayes, Jon Windle, as well as performing at several notable music festivals including Beverley Folk Festival Staxtonbury Music Festival and Musicport World Music Festival at Bridlington Spa in 2011.

In 2010 his debut, solo 10 track album "Humble Beginnings" was released. Parcell performed all the instruments on the limited edition pressing of 1000 CDs which has had several critically acclaimed reviews from respected publications. 2011 saw Parcell's music take a slightly different direction, bringing more traditional folk influences into his repertoire. His latest EP Painted By Numbers, which is an acoustic affair, features four tracks of stripped down organic sound featuring special guest Edwina Hayes on backing vocals. The EP reached number 40 in the iTunes daily singer songwriter chart.

His debut music video "Close Your Eyes" was on regular rotation on UK TV when it was accepted for the playlist on Greatest Hits TV on Sky Digital as part of the Lava TV showcase. His song "The Only One" is featured on the benefit compilation, Unity, for the Japan Tsunami Charity by Engineer Records which features mainstream acts such as The Gaslight Anthem, Fightstar and Funeral For a Friend. Parcell was invited by Alan Raw to play a live acoustic session on BBC Introducing as well as having his album and EP tracks played regularly on BBC Humberside and recently made it onto the featured undiscovered artist of the week on Yorkshire Coast Radio. He has also been a guest on Vixen 101 performing alongside Jake Morley. The track 'Close Your Eyes' was aired on national radio station Amazing Radio

== Musical influences ==
Parcell is influenced from a wide range of music from whom he has grown up with, spanning different genres including 1960s Pop music: The Beatles, The Kinks. American Pop Punk bands such as: Green Day, The Ataris, No Use For a Name. Singer songwriters Frank Turner, Elvis Costello, Marit Larsen, Edwina Hayes and Britpop bands such as Oasis and Blur. He combines these influences to create music which he describes as pop folk.

== Discography ==
=== Albums ===
- Humble Beginnings (2010)
- Expectations (2013)
- Cover Stories vol 1(2014)

=== EPs ===
- Painted By Numbers (2011)

=== Singles ===
- I Don't Need You (2013) In at the Eye Records

=== Compilation appearances ===
- Unity – a benefit for the children of the Japanese tsunami disaster – "The Only One" (2011) Engineer Records

== Music videos ==
- Close Your Eyes (2010)
- Stay in Touch (2011)
- Expectations (2013)
- I Don't Need You (2013)

== Musical endorsements ==
Parcell is a featured artist on the Turner Guitars website, and uses the Turner 60CE Dreadnought for unplugged performances and recording sessions.
