= List of shipwrecks in August 1844 =

The list of shipwrecks in August 1844 includes ships sunk, foundered, wrecked, grounded, or otherwise lost during August 1844.

== 1 August ==
List of shipwrecks: 1 August 1844
Ship	State	Description
Convoy	United States	The ship was wrecked on "Tuconia Island".
Isidore	United States	The ship was wrecked on Trundy's Reef, off Cape Elizabeth, Maine. She was on a voyage from Matanzas, Cuba to Saint Petersburg, Russia.
Laurel	United Kingdom	The fishing smack was wrecked on the Couchèe Rocks, off the coast of Jersey, Channel Islands with the loss of fourteen of her twenty crew.
Levenlass	United Kingdom	The ship was driven ashore at Garrock Point, Renfrewshire. She was on a voyage from Glasgow, Renfrewshire to Montreal, Province of Canada, British North America. She was later refloated and taken in to Greenock, Renfrewshire.
Wilberforce	United Kingdom	The ship ran aground on the Middenplat, in the North Sea off the Dutch coast. She was on a voyage from Dundee, Forfarshire to Exeter, Devon. She was refloated the next day.

== 2 August ==
List of shipwrecks: 2 August 1844
Ship	State	Description
Anne	United Kingdom	The ship foundered n the Bristol Channel off The Mumbles, Glamorgan.
Friends	United Kingdom	The sloop foundered in the Bristol Channel off Lundy Island, Devon with the loss of all on board.
Integrity	United Kingdom	The brig foundered off the coast of Cornwall with the loss of all six crew. The wreck subsequently came ashore at Northcott.
Julia	United Kingdom	The sloop was driven ashore at Worms Head, Glamorgan with the loss of a crew member. She was on a voyage from Bridgwater, Somerset to Dublin.
Maria	United Kingdom	The brig was wrecked off Tenby, Pembrokeshire with the loss of all but three of her crew.
Maria	United Kingdom	The ship departed from St. Jago de Cuba, Cuba for Llanelly, Glamorgan. No further trace, presumed foundered with the loss of all hands.
Mary	United Kingdom	The schooner was wrecked near Rhosilli, Glamorgan with the loss of a passenger.
Rose	United Kingdom	The ship departed from Penzance, Cornwall for a Welsh port. No further trace, presumed foundered with the loss of all hands.
Thetis	United Kingdom	The schooner foundered in Oxwich Bay Her four crew were rescued by Affo (United Kingdom).
Triton	United Kingdom	The smack was driven ashore and wrecked at Port Eynon Point, Glamorgan with the loss of five of her six crew. She was on a voyage from Par, Cornwall to Swansea, Glamorgan.
Valiant	United Kingdom	The ship ran aground on the West Barrows, in the North Sea off the coast of Essex. She was on a voyage from Limerick to London. She was refloated and taken in to the River Colne.
Whim	United Kingdom	The schooner was wrecked in Kynance Cove, Cornwall with the loss of all five of her crew.

== 3 August ==
List of shipwrecks: 3 August 1844
Ship	State	Description
Active	United Kingdom	The ship was driven ashore and severely damaged at Porthcawl, Glamorgan. Her crew were rescued. She was on a voyage from Newport, Monmouthshire to Plymouth, Devon. She was refloated on 6 August.
Alliance	United Kingdom	The ship was driven ashore and scuttled at Caldy Island, Pembrokeshire. She had been refloated by 6 August.
Ann	United Kingdom	The ship sank at The Mumbles, Glamorgan. Her crew were rescued. She was on a voyage from Cardiff, Glamorgan to London. She was refloated on 18 August.
Arama	Netherlands	The ship was driven ashore and wrecked between "Zeeburg" and Brielle, South Holland. She was on a voyage from Ventava, Courland Governorate to Rotterdam, South Holland.
Breeze	United Kingdom	The ship foundered in Carmarthen Bay.
Briton	United Kingdom	The steam tug sank at Bristol, Gloucestershire.
Brothers	United Kingdom	The ship was driven ashore at Wicklow.
Catherine and Mary	United Kingdom	The brig was run down and sunk in the English Channel off Dungeness, Kent with the loss of two of her four crew. Survivors were rescued by the coaster Despatch (United Kingdom). Catherine and Mary was on a voyage from Portmadoc, Caernarfonshire to Ipswich, Suffolk.
Commerce	United Kingdom	The ship was lost near St. David's Head, Pembrokeshire. Her crew were rescued.
Estafette	France	The schooner was driven ashore and wrecked at Le Havre, Seine-Inférieure.
Friends	United Kingdom	The ship was wrecked on the Cefn Sands, in Carmarthen Bay with the loss of all on board.
Friends	United Kingdom	The ship was driven ashore and scuttled at Caldy Island She had been refloated by 6 August.
Four Brothers	United Kingdom	The fishing smack was driven ashore and wrecked at Tenby, Pembrokeshire with the loss of two of her crew.
Harmony	United Kingdom	The ship was driven ashore and scuttled at Caldy Islands. She had been refloated by 6 August.
Hope	United Kingdom	The ship was driven ashore in Saint Tudwal's Islands, Caernarfonshire.
Jane	United Kingdom	The fishing smack was driven ashore and wrecked at Pendine, Carmarthenshire.
Jane and Elizabeth	United Kingdom	The ship was driven ashore in Saint Tudwal's Islands.
Margaret	United Kingdom	The schooner was driven ashore and wrecked in Broughton Bay. Her crew were rescued. She was on a voyage from Rotterdam, South Holland, Netherland to Bristol, Gloucestershire. She was refloated on 7 September and taken in to Whiteford, Glamorgan in a severely damaged condition.
Medina	United Kingdom	The smack was driven ashore and wrecked on the Cefn Sands with the loss of all hands.
Pilot	United Kingdom	The ship was driven ashore and wrecked near Pwllheli, Caernarfonshire. Her crew were rescued. She was on a voyage from Liverpool, Lancashire to Aberystwyth, Cardiganshire.
Pheasant	United Kingdom	The ship was driven ashore at The Mumbles. She was refloated on 17 August.
Prince of Wales	United Kingdom	The collier was wrecked on the Mouse Sand, in the North Sea off the coast of Essex. Her crew were rescued by Hope (United Kingdom).
Priscilla	United Kingdom	The ship was driven ashore in Saint Tudwal's Islands. She was on a voyage from Pwllheli, Caernarfonshire to Swansea, Glamorgan.
Richard	United Kingdom	The brig was driven ashore and wrecked at Tenby with the loss of four of her seven crew. She was on a voyage from Cardiff, Glamorgan to London.
Rose	United Kingdom	The yacht was driven ashore and wrecked at Pendine. Her crew were rescued.
Speculator	United Kingdom	The ship was driven ashore at Pembrey, Carmarthenshire.
Superb	United Kingdom	The ship was driven ashore at Barnstaple, Devon. She was on a voyage from Gloucester to Barnstaple. She was refloated on 13 August.
Terrier	United Kingdom	The ship was driven ashore and scuttled at Caldy Island. She had been refloated by 6 August.
Thomas Gelston	United Kingdom	The ship was abandoned in the Atlantic Ocean. She was on a voyage from Belfast, County Antrim to Quebec City, Province of Canada, British North America.
Union	United Kingdom	The ship was driven ashore on the Pendine Sands. Her crew were rescued.
Unique	France	The lugger was driven ashore and wrecked at Le Havre.
Vulcan	United Kingdom	The ship was driven ashore in Saint Tudwal's Islands.
Wave	United Kingdom	The ship was driven ashore at Porthcawl. Her crew were rescued. She was refloated on 15 August.
Xenia	United Kingdom	The ship was lost off St. Davids Head. Her crew were rescued. She was on a voyage from Charleston, South Carolina, United States to Liverpool.
X. L.	United Kingdom	The ship was run aground on the Newcombe Sand, in the English Channel off the coast of Kent and foundered. Her crew were rescued by Alert (United Kingdom). X. L. was on a voyage from Hartlepool, County Durham to Portsmouth, Hampshire.

== 4 August ==
List of shipwrecks: 4 August 1844
Ship	State	Description
Brama	Kingdom of Hanover	The ship capsized off Brielle, South Holland, Netherlands. All five people on board were rescued by Columbine (United Kingdom). Brama was on a voyage from Windau, Prussia to Rotterdam, South Holland.
Dart	United Kingdom	The ship was driven ashore at Tenby, Pembrokeshire. She was on a voyage from Sydney, New South Wales to Liverpool, Lancashire.
Prince of Wales	United Kingdom	The schooner was wrecked on the Mouse Sand, in the North Sea off the coast of Essex. Her crew were rescued. She was on a voyage from South Shields, County Durham to London.
Sarah	United Kingdom	The ship sank in the English Channel west of Dungeness, Kent.

== 5 August ==
List of shipwrecks: 5 August 1844
Ship	State	Description
Alfred	United Kingdom	The sailing barge sprang a leak and was run aground on the Maplin Sands, in the North Sea off the coast of Essex. She was on a voyage from Harwich, Essex to London. She was later refloated and resumed her voyage.
Harebell	United Kingdom	The ship was driven ashore at St. Just, Cornwall. She was on a voyage from Kertch, Russia to London. She was refloated and resumed her voyage.
Sharon	United Kingdom	The ship ran aground on the Goodwin Sands, Kent. She was on a voyage from Kronstadt, Russia to St. Ubes. Portugal. She was refloated and taken in to Ramsgate, Kent in a leaky condition.

== 6 August ==
List of shipwrecks: 6 August 1844
Ship	State	Description
Adelaide	United Kingdom	The ship was driven ashore near Nefyn, Caernarfonshire.
Behering	United Kingdom	The ship was wrecked at "Jeyerit Fatmi", on the Red Sea coast of Africa and opposite Mokha. Her crew were rescued.
Bolina	(United Kingdom of Great Britain and Ireland) Jersey	The ship was driven ashore west of Almería, Spain. She was on a voyage from Marseille, Bouches-du-Rhône], France to Penzance, Cornwall. She was refloated and put in to Almería before proceeding on her voyage.
Desire	United Kingdom	The ship was driven ashore near Barmouth, Caernarfonshire.
Fateh Salem	(Ottoman Empire) Habesh Eyalet	The ship was wrecked at "Khore Reamus", in the Strait of Hormuz. Her crew were rescued.
Highlander	United Kingdom	The ship ran aground on the Annot Bank, in the North Sea off the coast of Forfarshire. Her crew were rescued by the Montrose Lifeboat. She was on a voyage from Arkhangelsk, Russian Empire to Montrose, Forfarshire. She was refloated on 15 August and taken in to Montrose in a severely damaged condition.
Neptune	United Kingdom	The ship foundered in Carnarvon Bay. Her crew were rescued. She was on a voyage from Barrow-in-Furness, Lancashire to Swansea, Glamorgan.
New Milford	United Kingdom	The ship was driven ashore 8 nautical miles (15 km) west of Porthdinllaen, Caernarfonshire. She was on a voyage from Cardigan to Bristol, Gloucestershire.
Providence Goodwill	United Kingdom	The ship was driven ashore and severely damaged at Great Yarmouth, Norfolk. She was on a voyage from Goole, East Riding of Yorkshire to Maldon, Essex. She was refloated on 8 August and taken in to Great Yarmouth.
Union	United Kingdom	The ship was driven ashore and wrecked at Arbroath, Forfarshire. She was on a voyage from Saint Petersburg, Russia to Arbroath.
William and Friends	United Kingdom	The ship was abandoned in the Irish Sea off Lambay Island, County Dublin. Her crew were rescued by Kitty (United Kingdom). William and Friends was on a voyage from the Clyde to Dublin.

== 7 August ==
List of shipwrecks: 7 August 1844
Ship	State	Description
Arvonia	United Kingdom	The ship was driven ashore at Caernarfon. Her crew were rescued.
Falcon	United Kingdom	The ship ran aground on the Shoebury Knock Sand, in the North Sea off the coast of Essex. She was on a voyage from Montrose, Forfarshire to London.
Henricus Everhardees	Kingdom of Hanover	The ship was lost off the mouth of the Ems. Her crew were rescued.
Juan	United Kingdom	The ship was beached at Broad Haven, Pembrokeshire.
Le Figaro	France	The ship was driven ashore at Filey Bridge, Yorkshire, United Kingdom.
King William IV	United Kingdom	The ship was driven ashore at Caernarvon. Her crew were rescued.
Margaret	United Kingdom	The ship was driven ashore on Ynys Llanddwyn, Anglesey.
HMS Stromboli	Royal Navy	The paddle steamer ran aground on Horse Island, County Cork. She was refloated with assistance from HMS Hecate and HMS Tartarus (both Royal Navy) and taken in to Cork.
Union	United Kingdom	The ship was driven ashore and wrecked at Arbroath, Forfarshire. Her crew survived. She was on a voyage from Saint Petersburg, Russia to Arbroath.

== 8 August ==
List of shipwrecks: 8 August 1844
Ship	State	Description
Canarie	France	The ship was wrecked off Arendsburg, Norway. She was on a voyage from Saint-Malo, Ille-et-Vilaine to Saint Petersburg, Russia.
Delight	United Kingdom	The sloop was wrecked on Flodday, Loch Maddy.
Malta	United Kingdom	The ship was abandoned in the North Sea off Texel, North Holland, Netherlands. Her crew were rescued by William Tell (United Kingdom). Malta was on a voyage from Grangemouth, Stirlingshire to Rotterdam, South Holland, Netherlands.
Minerva	United Kingdom	The ship ran aground on the Herd Sand, in the North Sea off the coast of County Durham. She was on a voyage from Inverness to South Shields, County Durham. Minerva was refloated.
Miranda	United Kingdom	The ship was driven ashore and severely damaged in Silloth Bay.

== 9 August ==
List of shipwrecks: 9 August 1844
Ship	State	Description
Anna Sophia	Russia	The ship was driven ashore on "Worms Island". She was on a voyage from Reval to Riga. She was refloated on 15 September and taken in to Hiiumaa for repairs.
Brandon	United Kingdom	The ship ran aground on Nickman's Ground, in the Baltic Sea. She was on a voyage from Seaham, County Durham to Saint Petersburg, Russia. She was later refloated and resumed her voyage, arriving at Saint Petersburg on 16 August.
Celia Large	United Kingdom	The ship was wrecked on the West Maraguanna Reef. All on board were rescued. She was on a voyage from Jamaica to London.
Emelie	Prussia	The schooner was driven ashore at Königsberg.
Flanquer	Prussia	The ship capsized off Hela with the loss of three of her crew.
Hercules	Stettin	The ship was driven ashore and wrecked at Pillau, Prussia. Her crew were rescued. She was on a voyage from Königsberg to Newcastle upon Tyne, Northumberland, United Kingdom.
Neptune	United Kingdom	The ship ran aground on the Lapsand, in the Baltic Sea. She was on a voyage from Saint Petersburg, Russia to Hull. She was refloated and resumed her voyage.

== 10 August ==
List of shipwrecks: 10 Aug 1844
Ship	State	Description
Elba	Spain	The ship ran aground on the Vogelsand, in the North Sea. She was on a voyage from Bilbao to Hamburg. She was refloated and taken in to Cuxhaven.
Emilie	Prussia	The ship was driven ashore at Pillau. She was on a voyage from Liverpool, Lancashire, United Kingdom to Pillau. She was refloated on 21 August and taken in to Pillau.
Elizabeth and Mary	United Kingdom	The ship ran aground off Morup, Sweden and was wrecked. Her crew were rescued. She was on a voyage from Liverpool, Lancashire to a Baltic port. She was refloated and taken in to Varberg.
Hoop op Welvaart	Netherlands	The ship was driven ashore on Baltrum, Kingdom of Hanover. Her crew were rescued. She was on a voyage from Østerisør, Norway to Groningen. Hoop op Welvaart floated off the next day and was taken in to "Dornmersiel".
Lady Champness	United Kingdom	The ship was driven ashore at Great Orme Head, Caernarfonshire. She was refloated and taken in to Conwy for repairs.
Lark	United Kingdom	The sloop was driven ashore and wrecked near Grimsby, Lincolnshire; her crew were rescued.
Panama	United States	The whaler Panama under Captain Cummings dragged ashore and was wrecked in a heavy swell on the Island of Dominica, the wind having suddenly fallen away. She was broken up on the 14th Nov.
Vigilancen	Hamburg	The ship was driven ashore and wrecked near Grundsunda, Sweden.

== 11 August ==
List of shipwrecks: 11 August 1844
Ship	State	Description
Aurora	Bremen	The ship ran aground off "Roas", Denmark. She was refloated and resumed her voyage.
Drie Gebroeders	Netherlands	The ship was sighted off Helsingør, Denmark whilst on a voyage from Wismar to Amsterdam, North Holland. No further trace, presumed foundered with the loss of all hands.
Neptunus	Hamburg	The ship sprang a leak and foundered in the North Sea 40 nautical miles (74 km) north north east of the mouth of the Humber. Her crew were rescued by the fishing smack Sovereign (United Kingdom) although both captains and two crew of Sovereign were lost. Neptunus was on a voyage from Hull, Yorkshire, United Kingdom to Altona.
Two Friends	United Kingdom	The ship was driven ashore at Teignmouth, Devon. She was on a voyage from Stockton-on-Tees, County Durham to Teignmouth. She was refloated and put in to Teignmouth.
Vrouw Annegiena	Netherlands	The ship was sighted off Helsingør whilst of a voyage from Wismar to Amsterdam. No further trace, presumed foundered with the loss of all hands.

== 12 August ==
List of shipwrecks: 12 August 1844
Ship	State	Description
Alla Elizabeth	Stralsund	The ship was driven ashore near "Strundhoff". She was on a voyage from Riga, Russia to a Norwegian port.
Ardent	United Kingdom	The ship ran aground and sank on the Kentish Knock with the loss of her captain. She was on a voyage from Limerick to Boston, Lincolnshire.
Catherine	United Kingdom	The ship foundered in the English Channel 30 nautical miles (56 km) south of Portland Bill, Dorset. Her crew were rescued.
Charlotte and Louisa	Netherlands	The ship was sighted off Helsingør, Denmark whilst on a voyage from Danzig to Amsterdam, North Holland. No further trace, presumed foundered with the loss of all hands.
Henry	United Kingdom	The ship was wrecked in Ramsey Sound. She was on a voyage from Caernarfon to London.
Morgan	United Kingdom	The ship was driven ashore at Liebau, Kingdom of Prussia. Her crew were rescued.

== 13 August ==
List of shipwrecks: 13 August 1844
Ship	State	Description
Princess Josephine	Sweden	The ship capsized at Calais, France. She was later refloated.
Sir William Chaytor	United Kingdom	The ship was driven ashore at Ramsgate, Kent. She was refloated
Sovereign	(United Kingdom of Great Britain and Ireland) British North America	The schooner was driven ashore on Governors Island, Prince Edward Island. She was on a voyage from Halifax, Nova Scotia to Prince Edward Island. She was refloated and taken into port.

== 14 August ==
List of shipwrecks: 14 August 1844
Ship	State	Description
Agamemnon	Rostock	The ship ran aground in Seine Bay and capsized. She was on a voyage from Rostock to Cherbourg, Seine-Inférieure.
Caroline	Prussia	The brig ran aground on the Lemon and Ore Sand, in the North Sea off the coast of Norfolk, United Kingdom. She was on a voyage from Danzig to London, United Kingdom. Caroline refloated and assisted into Harwich, Essex by four smacks after 18 August.
Claudina Catharina	Netherlands	The ship was sighted off Helsingør, Denmark whilst on a voyage from Malmö, Sweden to Amsterdam, North Holland. No further trace, presumed foundered with the loss of all hands.
Pearl	United Kingdom	The schooner was in collision with Sophia (United Kingdom) and sank in Liverpool Bay. Her crew were rescued by Sophia. Pearl was on a voyage from Liverpool, Lancashire to Glasgow, Renfrewshire. The wreck of Pearl drove ashore at Southport, Lancashire.

== 15 August ==
List of shipwrecks: 15 August 1844
Ship	State	Description
Agamemnon	France	The ship ran aground, capsized and sank off Rouen, Seine-Inférieure. Her crew were rescued. She was on a voyage from Rostock to Cherbourg, Seine-Inférieure.
George and Jane	United Kingdom	The ship was driven ashore at Le Havre, Seine-Inférieure, France. She was on a voyage from Warkworth, Northumberland to Le Havre.
Sockragen	Flag unknown	The ship was driven ashore and wrecked on the coast of Spain. Her crew were rescued. She was on a voyage from Marseille, Bouches-du-Rhône, France to Plymouth, Devon, United Kingdom.
Spray	United Kingdom	The ship was driven ashore and sank at Le Havre. Her crew were rescued. She was on a voyage from Newcastle upon Tyne, Northumberland to Le Havre.
Warrior	United Kingdom	The barque was wrecked in the Magdalen Islands, Nova Scotia, British North America. Her crew were rescued. She was on a voyage from Richibucto, New Brunswick, British North America to Bideford, Devon.

== 16 August ==
List of shipwrecks: 16 August 1844
Ship	State	Description
Active	United Kingdom	The barque departed from Hull, Yorkshire for Hamburgh. Subsequently foundered in the North Sea.
Alexandrine	United Kingdom	The ship was driven ashore on Skagen, Denmark. She was on a voyage form Arbroath, Forfarshire to a Baltic port. She was refloated on 19 August and resumed her voyage on 29 August.
Farmer's Increase	United Kingdom	The ship was driven ashore and sank at Lavernock Point, Glamorgan. Her crew were rescued. She was on a voyage from Gloucester to London.
Favourite	United Kingdom	The brig ran aground on the Robin Rigg Bank, in the Solway Firth and foundered. Her crew survived. She was on a voyage from Lndonderry to Workington, Cumberland.
Fawcett	United Kingdom	The ship an aground on the Robin Rigg Bank. She was refloated.

== 17 August ==
List of shipwrecks: 17 August 1844
Ship	State	Description
Brothers	United Kingdom	The ship foundered off Rhyl, Denbighshire. Her crew were rescued. She was on a voyage from Wicklow to Chester, Cheshire. Brothers subsequently came ashore near Rhyl and was wrecked.
Lord Mulgrave	United Kingdom	The ship ran aground on the West Rocks, in the North Sea off the coast of Essex. She was on a voyage from Sunderland, County Durham to London. She was refloated and resumed her voyage.

== 18 August ==
List of shipwrecks: 18 August 1844
Ship	State	Description
Caroline	Netherlands	The ship struck the Lemon Sandbank, in the North Sea and capsized. Her crew were rescued. She was on a voyage from Memel, Prussia to Rotterdam, South Holland. She was taken in to Harwich, Essex, United Kingdom in a waterlogged condition on 25 August.
Christine	United Kingdom	The ship was driven ashore and wrecked in the Jahde. She was on a voyage from Newcastle upon Tyne, Northumberland to Hooksiel, Kingdom of Hanover.
Forth	United Kingdom	The ship ran aground and was damaged at Plymouth, Devon. She was refloated the next day.
Jane and Helen	United Kingdom	The smack was driven ashore and wrecked at Porthdinllaen, Caernarfonshire. She was on a voyage from Caernarvon to Southampton, Hampshire.

== 19 August ==
List of shipwrecks: 19 August 1844
Ship	State	Description
Amity	United Kingdom	The ship ran aground off Ameland, Friesland, Netherlands. She was on a voyage from Liverpool, Lancashire to Hamburg.
Devotion	United Kingdom	The ship was driven ashore and wrecked at Merlimont, Pas-de-Calais, France. She was on a voyage from Newport, Monmouthshire to Altona.
Fortuna	Norway	The ship was abandoned in the North Sea (54°36′N 4°29′E). Five of her ten crew were rescued by Hudson (United States), the rest were left on board. Survivors brought to Frederikshavn. Fortuna was on a voyage from Narva, Russia to Amsterdam, North Holland, Netherlands.
Hoffnung	Hamburg	The ship was driven ashore on "Langerry Island". Her crew were rescued. She was on a voyage from a Scottish port to Hamburg.
Hoffnung	Flag unknown	The ship was wrecked on Norderney, Kingdom of Hanover. She was on a voyage from "Steinharsersiel" to Hull, Yorkshire, United Kingdom.
Pilotage	Belgium	The sloop was driven ashore at Wijk aan Zee, North Holland.
Rosalie Sarzena	Flag unknown	The ship was driven ashore and wrecked on Juist, Kingdom of Hanover.
Trois Montes Ranges	Bremen	The ship was driven ashore near the mouth of the Geeste. She was refloated on 26 August.
Zephyr	Norway	The ship was wrecked on Grønningen Island. Her crew were rescued. She was on a voyage from Figueira da Foz, Portugal to Bergen.

== 20 August ==
List of shipwrecks: 20 August 1844
Ship	State	Description
Batavier	Netherlands	The steamship ran aground off Hellevoetsluis, Zeeland. Her passengers were evacuated. She was on a voyage from Rotterdam, South Holland to London, United Kingdom. Batavier was later refloated and resumed her voyage. She arrived at Gravesend, Kent, United Kingdom on 28 August.
Gerbrand	Hamburg	The ship was driven ashore and wrecked on Ameland, Friesland, Netherlands with the loss of all but one of her crew. She was on a voyage from Hamburg to Rouen, Seine-Inférieure, France.
Jane and Eliza	United Kingdom	The ship was driven ashore at Petten, South Holland. She was on a voyage from Newport, Monmouthshire to Dordrecht, South Holland.
Methesis	United Kingdom	The barque ran aground on the Elbow End Bank, at the mouth of the River Tay and was severely damaged. She was on a voyage from Ichaboe Island, Portuguese West Africa to Aberdeen. She was refloated and towed in to Ferry-Port on Craig, Fife.
Thomas Perkins	United States	The ship was driven ashore at New York. She was later refloated.

== 21 August ==
List of shipwrecks: 21 August 1844
Ship	State	Description
Ann and Mary	United Kingdom	The brig foundered in the Irish Sea west of the Isle of Man with the loss of all hands.
Emma Maria	France	The schooner was driven ashore and wrecked near Fécamp, Seine-Inférieure with the loss of three of her crew. She was on a voyage from Pontrieux, Côtes du Nord to Rouen, Seine-Inférieure.
Isabel	Spain	The barque, a prize of HMS Cleopatra (Royal Navy)) was driven ashore and wrecked in Algoa Bay. Her crew were rescued.
Larkins	United Kingdom	The East Indiaman was damaged by fire at Madras, India.
Maria Anna	Kingdom of Hanover	The ship ran aground off Haurvig, Denmark. Her crew were rescued.
Seaforth	United Kingdom	The ship foundered at the mouth of the Kowie River, Cape Colony.
Telemachus	United Kingdom	The schooner was driven ashore and wrecked on Terschelling, Friesland, Netherlands. Her crew were rescued. She was on a voyage from Newport, Monmouthshire to Altona.
Trekboer Cobern	(United Kingdom of Great Britain and Ireland) Cape Colony	The ship was driven ashore and wrecked in Algoa Bay with the loss of a crew member.
Trois Enfans	France	The ship was wrecked on the Sherweather Sands, in the Bristol Channel. She was on a voyage from Newport to Brest, Finistère.
Union	United Kingdom	The ship was driven ashore on Eierland, North Holland, Netherlands. She was on a voyage from Stettin to Hull, Yorkshire. She was refloated ad taken in to a port on Texel, North Holland.
Vrow Antina	Hamburg	The ship was wrecked on the Movinsand. Her crew were rescued. She was on a voyage from a Scottish port to Hamburg.
574	United Kingdom	The ship ran aground at Gloucester. She was on a voyage from Gloucester to Quebec City Province of Canada, British North America. She was refloated the next day and taken in to Gloucester.

== 22 August ==
List of shipwrecks: 22 August 1844
Ship	State	Description
Æolus	(United Kingdom of Great Britain and Ireland) Van Diemen's Land	The sloop was wrecked opposite the coast of Huon Island.
Glasgow	United Kingdom	The ship ran aground at Peterhead, Aberdeenshire. She was on a voyage from London to Inverness. She was later refloated and resumed her voyage.
Isabella	(United Kingdom of Great Britain and Ireland) Van Diemen's Land	The ship was wrecked at Cape Buffon, South Australia. Her crew were rescued.
Johanna	Flag unknown	The ship was sighted off Helsingør, Denmark whilst on a voyage from "Elburg" to Hull, Yorkshire, United Kingdom. No further trace, presumed foundered with the loss of all hands.
Maggie	United Kingdom	The ship was driven ashore in a capsized state on Rottumeroog, Kingdom of Hanover.
Providence	United Kingdom	The ship, which had collided with a brig on 16 August and sprang a leak four days later, was abandoned in the Dogger Bank. Her crew were rescued by the barque Minerva (Kingdom of Hanover).
Spencer Wynne	United Kingdom	The ship was driven ashore and wrecked at Aberystwyth, Cardiganshire. Her crew were rescued.
Twende Brodre	Norway	The ship was abandoned in the North Sea. Her crew were rescued by Johanna (Kingdom of Hanover). Twende Brodre was on a voyage from Gothenburg to Jersey, Channel Islands. She was taken in to Bremen on 24 August.

== 23 August ==
List of shipwrecks: 23 August 1844
Ship	State	Description
Helen	United Kingdom	The ship ran aground on the Long Sand, in the North Sea off the coast of Essex. She was on a voyage from Inverkeithing, Fife to Shoreham-by-Sea, Sussex. She was refloated and put in to Ramsgate, Kent in a leaky condition.
Mary Ann	(United Kingdom of Great Britain and Ireland) British North America	The ship was wrecked on the coast of Labrador.

== 24 August ==
List of shipwrecks: 24 August 1844
Ship	State	Description
Energy	United Kingdom	The ship ran aground in the River Shannon. She was on a voyage from Limerick to Quebec City, Province of Canada, British North America.
Lady Mount Stewart	United Kingdom	The ship ran aground in the Swin and was damaged. She was on a voyage form London to Dublin.

== 25 August ==
List of shipwrecks: 25 August 1844
Ship	State	Description
Eva	Bremen	The ship was driven ashore at Tønning, Duchy of Holstein. She was on a voyage from Bremen to Wolgast, Prussia.
Friendship	United Kingdom	The ship sprang a leak and was beached in St Brides Bay. She was on a voyage from Aberdyfi, Merionethshire to Newport, Monmouthshire. She was refloated the next day and taken in to Milford Haven, Pembrokeshire.
Iduna	Bremen	The ship was driven ashore and severely damaged at Tønning. She was on a voyage from Bremen to Stettin.
Triton	Hamburg	The ship ran aground at Helsingør, Denmark. She was refloated on 27 August and taken in to Helsingør.

== 26 August ==
List of shipwrecks: 26 August 1844
Ship	State	Description
Cecilie Maria	Norway	The ship was wrecked at Kærgård near Varde, Denmark. Her crew were rescued. She was on a voyage from Lillesund to Ribe.
Effort	United Kingdom	The brig was driven ashore and wrecked at Thorsminde, Denmark. Her crew were rescued. She was on a voyage from Riga, Russia to Bristol, Gloucestershire.
Groenland	French Navy	The paddle frigate was wrecked 3 leagues (9 nautical miles (17 km)) from Larache, Morocco and was abandoned by her crew. The wreck was set afire and burnt.
John and Mary	United Kingdom	The ship ran aground on a reef off Skagen, Denmark. She was on a voyage from Newcastle upon Tyne, Northumberland to Saint Petersburg, Russia. John and Mary was refloated and put in to Helsingør, Denmark in a sinking condition.
Rambler	United Kingdom	The ship was abandoned with the loss of her captain. She was on a voyage from Königsberg, Prussia to London.

== 27 August ==
List of shipwrecks: 27 August 1844
Ship	State	Description
Britannia	United Kingdom	The ship ran aground and was wrecked off Wangeroog, Kingdom of Hanover. Her crew were rescued. She was on a voyage from Berwick upon Tweed, Northumberland to a Baltic port.
Express	United Kingdom	The ship was wrecked off Thorsminde, Denmark. Her crew were rescued. She was on a voyage from Hartlepool, County Durham to Saint Petersburg, Russia.
Hoffnung	Kingdom of Hanover	The ship was wrecked off "Rawenburg", Denmark. Her crew were rescued. She was on a voyage from Memel, Prussia to Leer.
Jupiter	Brazil	The brig was burnt in the Corimba River, Portuguese West Africa by the Portuguese Navy as she was engaged in the African slave trade.
Lena	United Kingdom	The ship ran aground at Aberdeen. She was on a voyage from Danzig to Aberdeen.
Nostra Senora de Belvedera	Kingdom of Sardinia	The brig was driven ashore north of Pernambuco, Brazil.
Robert and George	United Kingdom	The ship ran aground off Skagen, Denmark. She was on a voyage from Newcastle upon Tyne, Northumberland to Saint Petersburg, Russia. She was refloated and put in to "Skula", Sweden.
Skylark	United Kingdom	The ship ran aground in the Elbe. She was on a voyage from Hamburg to Stockton-on-Tees, County Durham. She was refloated and put back to Hamburg in a leaky condition.
St. Antonie	Hamburg	The ship was driven ashore on Langeoog, Kingdom of Hanover. Her crew were rescued. She was on a voyage from a Norwegian port to Hamburg.
Wilhelmina	Stralsund	The ship was driven ashore near "Aubery", Denmark. Her crew were rescued. She was on a voyage from Hull, Yorkshire, United Kingdom to Danzig.

== 28 August ==
List of shipwrecks: 28 August 1844
Ship	State	Description
Cumbrian	United Kingdom	The ship was driven ashore. She was refloated seventeen day later and resumed her voyage to Sierra Leone. She arrived on 2 October and was condemned.
Dorothy	United Kingdom	The ship was driven ashore at Peterhead, Aberdeenshire. She was on a voyage from Sunderland, County Durham to Nairn. She was refloated and taken in to Peterhead.

== 29 August ==
List of shipwrecks: 29 August 1844
Ship	State	Description
Clifton	United Kingdom	The ship ran aground and was damaged at New Orleans, Louisiana, United States.
Henry	France	The ship ran aground and was damaged at New Orleans. She was on a voyage from New Orleans to Marseille, Bouches-du-Rhône.
Houghton-le-Spring	United Kingdom	The brig was wrecked on the Refshorn, off the coast of Denmark with the loss of all eleven crew.
Johanna Catherina	Hamburg	The ship sprang a leak and sank in the North Sea 8 nautical miles (15 km) off Whitby, Yorkshire, United Kingdom. Her crew were rescued by a fishing yawl. She was on a voyage from King's Lynn, Norfolk to Seaham, County Durham, United Kingdom.
Neptune	Danzig	The ship was driven ashore on Amrum, Duchy of Holstein. She became a wreck on 21 October.
Rasmus	Flag unknown	The ship was driven ashore at "Marschonak". Her crew were rescued.
Sally	United Kingdom	The ship ran aground and capsized at Skinburness, Cumberland. She was on a voyage from Saint John, New Brunswick, British North America to Carlisle, Cumberland. She was righted and towed in to Port Carlisle.

== 30 August ==
List of shipwrecks: 30 August 1844
Ship	State	Description
Anna Sophia	Netherlands	The ship capsized off Langeoog, Kingdom of Hanover. She was on a voyage from Bergen, Norway to Amsterdam, North Holland.
Arene	Sweden	The ship was lost at "Sikhjelma".
Camoens	United Kingdom	The ship was wrecked at the mouth of the New Calabar River.
Catharina; Ellen	Denmark; United Kingdom	The ships were in collision and were both driven ashore at Hamburg. Both were refloated. Ellen proceeded on her voyage from Hamburg to Kingston upon Hull, Yorkshire on 3 September. The yacht Catharina put back to Hamburg in a leaky condition.
Henry Winch	United Kingdom	The ship was wrecked at the mouth of the New Calabar River with the loss of three of her crew.
Michel	Portugal	The ship was wrecked in Buenos Bay and was abandoned by her crew. She was on a voyage from Figueira da Foz to a Norwegian port.
Panope	United Kingdom	The ship ran aground at the mouth of the New Calabar River. She was refloated on 1 September and taken in to Bonny.

== 31 August ==
List of shipwrecks: 31 August 1844
Ship	State	Description
Thetis	United Kingdom	The ship ran aground in Colwell Bay, Isle of Wight. She was on a voyage from Liverpool, Lancashire to Southampton, Hampshire. She was refloated the next day and resumed her voyage.

== Unknown date ==
List of shipwrecks: Unknown date in August 1844
Ship	State	Description
Amethyst	United Kingdom	The ship was wrecked on the coast of Jutland. She was on a voyage from Greifswald to London.
Artemis	United Kingdom	The ship was wrecked in the Chiloé Archipelago before 15 August. Her crew were rescued. She was on a voyage from Valparaíso, Chile to Liverpool, Lancashire.
Baldur	Sweden	The ship was abandoned in the North Sea before 28 August. Her crew were rescued. She was on a voyage from Gothenburg or Stockholm to Hull, Yorkshire, United Kingdom.
Brothers	United Kingdom	The lugger was wrecked on the Shearwater Sands, in the Bristol Channel. She was on a voyage from Newport, Monmouthshire to Brest, Finistère, France.
Bourbonnais	France	The ship was wrecked at Papéiti, Tahiti before 19 August.
Caroline	Norway	The brig was abandoned in the North Sea before 21 August.
Eliza and Mary	United Kingdom	The ship was driven ashore on Newfoundland, British North America.
Express	United States	The ship was wrecked in the Straits of Magellan before 15 August Her crew were rescued. she was on a voyage from New York to Valparaíso, Chile.
Faith or Forth	United Kingdom	The ship was driven ashore and damaged in Batten Sound before 19 August. She was later refloated.
George	(United Kingdom of Great Britain and Ireland) British North America	The steamship stuck rocks and sank in the Saint Lawrence River. She had been refloated and taken in to Quebec City, Province of Canada by 23 August.
George and Jane	United Kingdom	The ship was driven ashore at Le Havre, Seine-Inférieure, France. She was on a voyage from Warkworth, Northumberland to Le Havre. She was refloated.
Good Intent	United Kingdom	The smack was driven ashore and wrecked on Drakes Island, Devon before 9 August.
Isabella	United Kingdom	The ship departed from Cape Town, Cape Colony for Ichaboe Island, Portuguese West Africa. No further trace, presumed foundered with the loss of all hands.
Loyal Packet	United Kingdom	The ship struck a rock off Hammerfest, Norway and was wrecked before 7 August.
Neptun	Danzig	The ship was abandoned in the North Sea before 22 August.
Norham Castle	United Kingdom	The ship ran aground in the Sea of Marmora. She was on a voyage from Odesa to London. She was refloated but consequently put in to Malta in a leaky condition, arriving on 2 September.
Pandora	United Kingdom	The ship caught fire in the Atlantic Ocean before 21 August.
Providence	United Kingdom	The ship was wrecked on "Langlais Island". Her crew were rescued. She was on a voyage from Richibucto, New Brunswick, British North America to Cork.
Spray	United Kingdom	The ship was driven ashore and sank at Le Havre. She was on a voyage from Newcastle upon Tyne, Northumberland to Le Havre. Spray was refloated and taken in to port but sank again due to damage sustained.
Syrinx	United Kingdom	The ship sank off Boon Island, Maine, United States before 5 August. She was on a voyage from the Clyde to Boston, Massachusetts, United States. She was refloated and taken in to Saco, Maine.
Three Sostre	Norway	The ship was abandoned in the North Sea. Her crew were rescued by Rosa ( Kolberg). Three Sostre was on a voyage from Greifswald to Guernsey, Channel Islands.
