= Staxton =

Village in North Yorkshire, England

Coordinates: 54.1981°N 0.4459°W

- Location within North Yorkshire
- OS grid reference: TA015795
- Civil parish: Willerby
- Unitary authority: North Yorkshire
- Ceremonial county: North Yorkshire
- Region: Yorkshire and the Humber
- Country: England
- Sovereign state: United Kingdom
- Post town: SCARBOROUGH
- Postcode district: YO12
- Dialling code: 01944
- Police: North Yorkshire
- Fire: North Yorkshire
- Ambulance: Yorkshire
- UK Parliament: Thirsk and Malton

Staxton is a village in North Yorkshire, England, part of the civil parish of Willerby, and situated approximately 8.2 miles from Scarborough town centre.

Until 1974 the village lay in the historic county boundaries of the East Riding of Yorkshire. From 1974 to 2023 it was part of the district of Ryedale, it is now administered by the unitary North Yorkshire Council.

== Geography ==
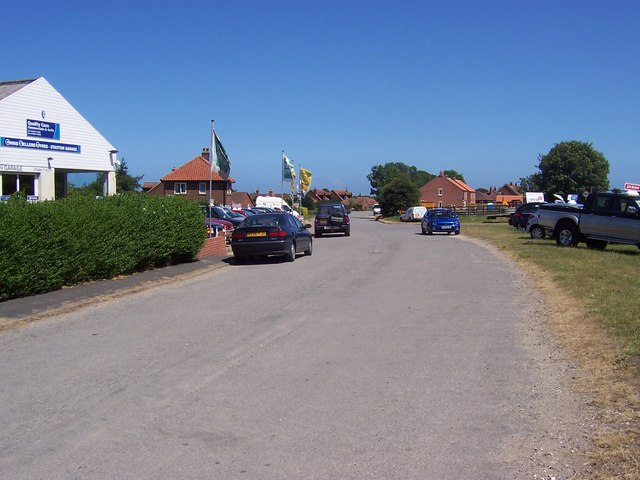
Staxton

The village is a linear settlement situated in the south easterly edge of the Vale of Pickering. The village is one of several which follow what would have been the shoreline of the lake that filled the valley in the last ice age.

Approximately 1 mile (1.6 km) north of the village is the River Hertford, a tributary to the River Derwent, which has been straightened to allow increased farming of the valley. Staxton Hill is south of the village and is the northerly edge of the Yorkshire Wolds, with its highest point at 150 metres (490 ft) above sea level.

Land use in the area is mainly for settlements or farming, with a small wood and disused quarry on top of Staxton Hill.

Adjoining Staxton is the smaller village of Willerby. To the north is the village of Seamer, to the east is the village of Flixton, to the south is the village of Foxholes and to the west are the villages of Ganton and Sherburn. Nearby are the towns of Scarborough and Filey, the nearest city is York.

== History ==
The name of Staxton comes from Old Scandinavian meaning a village owned by a man by the name of Stakkr, and is found as Stacstone in the Domesday Book of 1086. There have been several archaeological digs around the Staxton area finding human bodies and other items.

In 1937 RAF Staxton Wold, a Royal Air Force radar station, was set up at the top of Staxton Hill and is currently the oldest serving radar station.

== Transport ==
=== Road ===
The A64 closely bypasses the village which is joined by the A1039, leading to Filey, at Staxton roundabout, and the B1249 leading to Driffield, at Staxton traffic lights. Traffic accidents are common on the B1249 due to the steep incline of the hill and various blind corners. In an effort to reduce traffic accidents, a new set of traffic lights were installed in early 2008 which also incorporated improved footpaths and bus stops.

=== Bus ===
Staxton is served by regular Yorkshire Coastliner buses, operated by Transdev Blazefield, which offer connections to Scarborough, Filey, Malton, York, Leeds and other destinations in-between.

=== Rail ===
Staxton is not served by a railway station but a branch of the North TransPennine line passes by the village connecting Scarborough and York. The nearest railway station is at Seamer.

== Economy ==
Staxton's main economic activity is agriculture. Both arable farming and livestock farming, commonly sheep, pigs and cattle.

There are also several camp-sites near the village, serving tourists visiting the Yorkshire Coast.

Other businesses in the village consist of the Hare and Hounds pub, which is over 200 years old built to serve passing horse-drawn coaches and still receives trade from passing motorists on the A64, a butchers, a garage, a Fish and Chip Restaurant and Takeaway and Shell petrol station situated just outside the village as Staxton Services.
The village post office and general shop was closed due to increased competition from super markets and increased accessibility to Scarborough.

== Education ==
Hertford Vale Voluntary Controlled Church of England Primary School is situated in the centre of the village and serves primary school and pre-school children from the village as well as the nearby villages of Flixton, Foxholes, Ganton and Folkton. The school opened in September 1989, replacing Willerby School which had opened in 1878.

== Other important places ==
- The village hall opened on 1 March 1938 is frequently used for village events and other private functions.
- The war memorial was originally erected in 1920 and honours those who lost their lives in the First World War and Second World War. Every Remembrance Day wreaths of poppies are placed on the memorial. The memorial used to be at the east end of the village but was then moved to a more central place in the village.
- Staxton Cricket Club was formed in 1849, and regularly play during the summer. They field two teams in the Scarborough Beckett Cricket League.
- In 2009 the first Staxtonbury Music Festival began.

== See also ==
- Listed buildings in Willerby, North Yorkshire
