= Listed buildings in Willerby, North Yorkshire =

Willerby is a civil parish in the county of North Yorkshire, England. It contains twelve listed buildings that are recorded in the National Heritage List for England. Of these, one is listed at Grade II*, the middle of the three grades, and the others are at Grade II, the lowest grade. The parish contains the villages of Willerby and Staxton and the surrounding area. The listed buildings consist of houses and associated structures, farmhouses and farm buildings, a church and associated structures, a chapel, a milestone and a war memorial.

== Key ==
Grade	Criteria
II*	Particularly important buildings of more than special interest
II	Buildings of national importance and special interest

== Buildings ==
Name and location	Photograph	Date	Notes	Grade
St Peter's Church; 54.19846°N 0.45596°W		13th century	The church has been altered and extended through the centuries, including a restoration in 1881–82. It is built in sandstone with a slate roof, and consists of a nave continuous with the chancel, a south porch, a north aisle and a west tower. The tower has buttresses, a three-light west window, a stair turret on the north, and louvred bell openings, above which is a string course and an embattled parapet. The porch is gabled, and contains an arched opening, a hood mould and a keystone carved with a head, and a sundial.	II*
Wall and gateposts, St Peter's Church; 54.19826°N 0.45598°W		Late medieval (possible)	The walls and gateposts are in sandstone. The walls are about 1.7 metres (5 ft 7 in) in height, with sloped coping and a moulded ridge. The gateposts are dated 1822, they are about 1.4 metres (4 ft 7 in) in height, and have round heads.	II
Spital House Farmhouse; 54.20119°N 0.43256°W		Early 18th century	The farmhouse, which was later extended, is in whitewashed sandstone and chalk, with extensions in red brick, a parapet and a pantile roof. There is one storey and an attic, two bays, a single-bay extension on the left, and a single-storey outbuilding on each end. The windows are horizontally sliding sashes, those in the attics in raking dormers. The ground floor openings have painted wedge lintels.	II
Outbuildings north of Spital House Farmhouse; 54.20143°N 0.43259°W	—	18th century	The outbuildings consist of a cart shed and loft, and a range of byres. They are in chalkstone and variegated brick and have pantile roofs. The cart shed and loft have two storeys and two bays, and contain a loft door. The range has a single storey and seven bays, and contains stable doors and double doors.	II
Outbuildings northeast of Spital House Farmhouse; 54.20131°N 0.43232°W	—	18th century	A range of cow byres in whitewashed chalkstone with a pantile roof. There is one storey and six bays, and they contain two stable doors, and a variety of windows.	II
White Cottage and wall 54.19812°N 0.44162°W	—	18th century	The house is in whitewashed chalkstone on a sandstone plinth, with a pantile roof. There are two storeys, two bays and an outshut. On the front is a doorway, the ground floor windows are casements, and on the upper floor are horizontally sliding sashes. To the right is a garden wall with sloped coping, about 1.6 metres (5 ft 3 in) in height.	II
Buildings attached to Hertford Cottage; 54.19764°N 0.44303°W	—	Late 18th century	The farm building, partly used as a shop, is on a corner site, and is in whitewashed chalkstone on a sandstone plinth, with brick arches, quoins, a raised eaves band, and a pantile roof, hipped on the right. On the front is an elliptical arch, to its right are a doorway and a window, both with segmental arches, and a reset datestone.	II
Wall and building at rear of Staxton Farmhouse; 54.19756°N 0.44329°W	—	Late 18th century	The wall and farm building are in chalkstone. The building has limestone quoins, a raised eaves band, and a hipped pantile roof. There are no openings to the street. The wall is about 3 metres (9.8 ft) in height, and has sandstone coping.	II
Milestone; 54.19623°N 0.45466°W		Early 19th century (probable)	The milestone is on the north side of the A64 road. It is in sandstone, about 0.5 metres (1 ft 8 in) in height, and without an inscription.	II
Pear Tree Farmhouse; 54.19720°N 0.44258°W	—	Early 19th century	The farmhouse is in variegated brick, with boxed eaves, and a pantile roof with coped gables and shaped kneelers. There are two storeys, three bays, and a rear wing. The central doorway has a semicircular fanlight with Gothic tracery, the windows are sashes, and all the openings have painted flat arches of gauged brick.	II
Methodist Church; 54.19859°N 0.44009°W	—	1847	The chapel is in red brick with a slate roof. There is one storey and three bays. On the front is a doorway with a radial fanlight and three sash windows, all round-headed with brick voussoirs. Above the doorway is an inscribed and dated panel.	II
Staxton and Willerby War Memorial; 54.19724°N 0.44617°W		1920	The war memorial stands in a garden by a road junction. It is in gritstone, and consists of a Latin cross, the limbs ending in pyramidal caps, on a hexagonal shaft. This is on a square pedestal with chamfered corners and a hexagonal upper surface, on a two-step podium. On the pedestal are inset panels in polished granite, one with an inscription, and the others with the names of those lost in the First World War.	II
