= St John's Church, Folkton =

Church in Folkton, North Yorkshire, England

Coordinates: 54°12′08″N 0°23′10″W

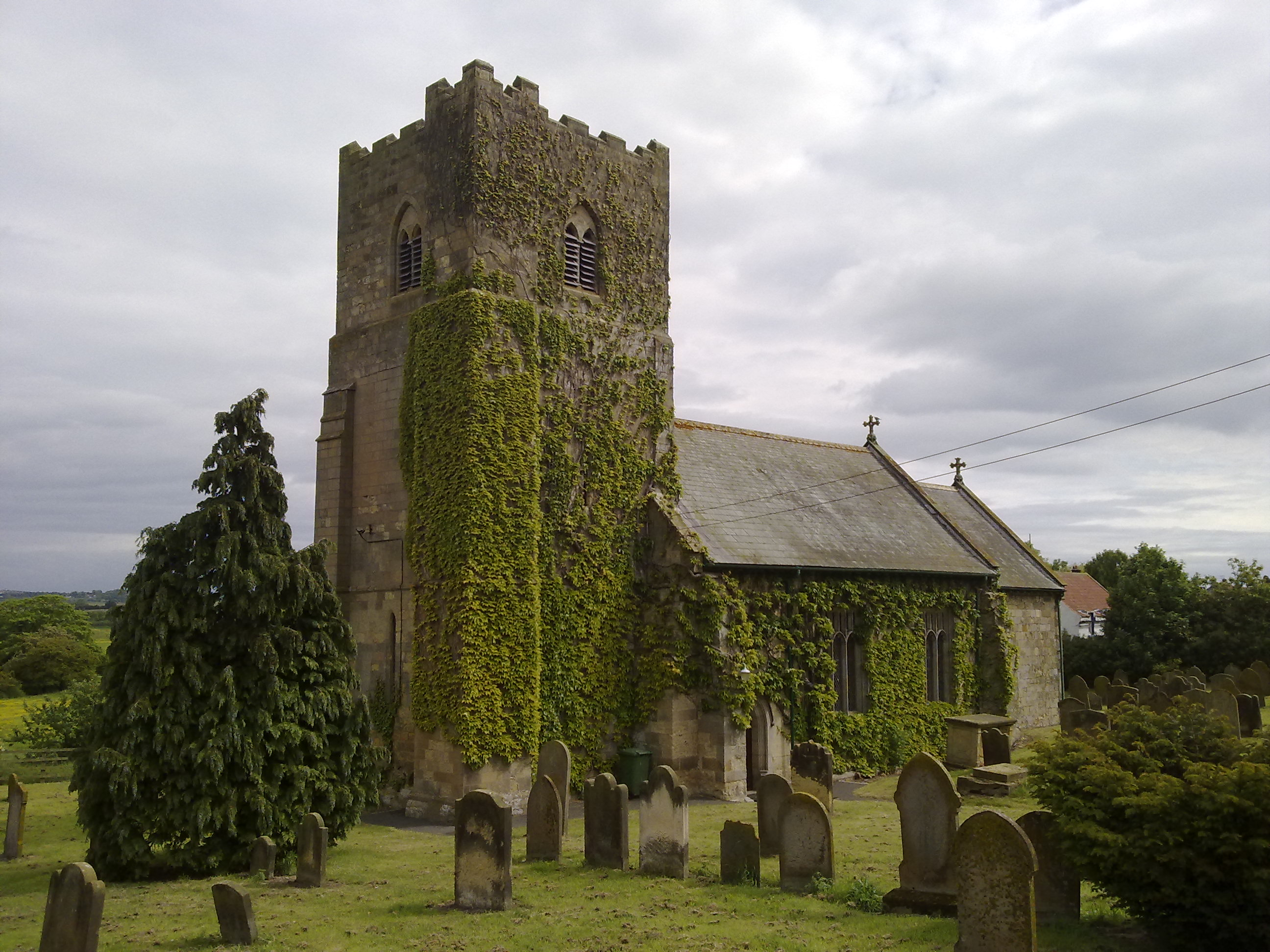
The church, in 2009

St John's Church is the parish church of Folkton, a village in North Yorkshire, in England.

The church was built in the mid 12th century, from which time the north doorway and part of the chancel arch survive. It was largely rebuilt in the 13th century, with work from this period including the lower parts of the tower. The chancel was shortened in 1772, and the nave was reduced in width by 10 feet (3.0 m). The east window was replaced in 1854, the top section of the tower was rebuilt between 1877 and 1881, and there was a heavy restoration between 1893 and 1895, when the windows in the south wall were altered. The roof was replaced in 1906, and in 1964 a small brick shed was added to house a new heating system. The church was grade II* listed in 1966.

The church is built in sandstone with a slate roof, and consists of a nave, a chancel and a west tower. The tower has three stages, angle buttresses, a stair turret with slits, two-light bell openings under pointed arches, and an embattled parapet. The south doorway has a pointed arch, a quoined surround, and a hood mould on corbels. There are some fragments of mediaeval stained glass in the north window, and there is a Norman tub font.

== See also ==
- Grade II* listed churches in North Yorkshire (district)
- Listed buildings in Folkton
