= Listed buildings in Folkton =

Folkton is a civil parish in the county of North Yorkshire, England. It contains 14 listed buildings that are recorded in the National Heritage List for England. Of these, one is listed at Grade II*, the middle of the three grades, and the others are at Grade II, the lowest grade. The parish contains the villages of Folkton and Flixton and the surrounding countryside, and the listed buildings consist of houses, farmhouses, farm buildings and a church.

== Key ==
Grade	Criteria
II*	Particularly important buildings of more than special interest
II	Buildings of national importance and special interest

== Buildings ==
Name and location	Photograph	Date	Notes	Grade
St John's Church; 54.20212°N 0.38624°W		13th century	The church has been altered and extended through the centuries, including alterations and a restoration in 1893–95. It is built in sandstone with a slate roof, and consists of a nave, a chancel and a west tower. The tower has three stages, angle buttresses, a stair turret with slits, two-light bell openings under pointed arches, and an embattled parapet. The south doorway has a pointed arch, a quoined surround, and a hood mould on corbels.	II*
Chapel Farm; 54.20192°N 0.40474°W	—	18th century	A farmhouse in chalk on a brick plinth, with painted brick dressings, quoins and a slate roof. There are two storeys and two bays. In the centre is a doorway with a fanlight, the windows are sashes, and all the openings have quoined brick surrounds and wedge lintels.	II
Barn east of Grange Farmhouse; 54.20160°N 0.38689°W		18th century	The barn and hayloft are in whitewashed chalk on a brick plinth, with a stepped brick eaves course and a pantile roof. There is a single storey and a loft. In the centre is a thin timber lintel, with a slit vent to the right, and pitching holes under the eaves. In the left gable end is a blocked pitching window.	II
Little Bella Farmhouse; 54.20331°N 0.40672°W	—	18th century	A farmhouse, later a private house, in chalk, whitewashed and painted at the rear and sides, with brick quoins, a brick eaves course, and a pantile roof. There is one storey and attics, three bays and a rear extension. The doorway has a fanlight, and the windows are pivoting sashes. Inside the upper floor rooms is a single pair of crossed-apex upper crucks.	II
Dovecote east of West Flotmanby Farmhouse; 54.20127°N 0.35434°W	—	18th century	The dovecote is in red brick, with sandstone quoins, coved eaves and a pantile roof. There is a rectangular plan and two storeys. The doorway has a timber lintel, on the ridge is a timber glover, and inside there are resting boxes and landing platforms on two sides.	II
Church Farmhouse; 54.20226°N 0.38560°W	—	Late 18th century	The farmhouse is rendered and whitewashed, with an eaves cornice and a pantile roof. There is one storey and attics, a double depth plan, and three bays. The doorway is recessed with a gabled porch, there is one casement window, and the others are sashes, those in the upper floor breaking through the eaves.	II
High Bella Farmhouse; 54.20259°N 0.40624°W	—	Late 18th century	The farmhouse is in stone, painted and partly rendered, with a pantile roof. There are two storeys, and on the front are two doorways. Most of the windows are horizontally-sliding sashes, and there is one three-light casement window at the rear. All the openings have painted timber lintels.	II
Old Inn Farmhouse; 54.20218°N 0.38516°W		Late 18th century	The Bluebell Inn, later a farmhouse, is in whitewashed chalk with brick dressings, a stepped brick modillion eaves course, and a pantile roof. There are two storeys and two bays. The doorway is in the centre, the windows are horizontally-sliding sashes, and the ground floor openings have brick segmental arches.	II
Barn southeast of Grange Farmhouse; 54.20179°N 0.38676°W	—	Late 18th to early 19th century	A cartshed and stable in whitewashed chalk on a brick plinth, with brick dressings, a stepped brick eaves course, and a pantile roof with tumbled brick gables. There is a single storey and a loft, a three-bay cart shed and stable to the left. It contains two segmental-arched openings, and three upper openings with quoined surrounds, and at the rear are brick piers to cart arches. On the right gable are external steps to a pitching door.	II
Manor Farmhouse and outbuilding 54.20107°N 0.38673°W	—	Late 18th to early 19th century	The building is in chalk on a brick plinth, with brick dressings, quoins, and a pantile roof with tumbled brick gables. It consists of a house with two storeys and three bays, a cottage to the left and an outbuilding to the right, both with a single storey and an attic. The house has a central doorway with a patterned fanlight and sash windows. In the cottage is a round-headed stair window, and the outbuilding has two square pitching holes. All the openings have quoined brick surrounds.	II
Barn southwest of Manor Farmhouse; 54.20088°N 0.38726°W		Late 18th to early 19th century	A threshing barn and a cartshed in whitewashed chalk on a brick plinth, with brick dressings, quoins and a pantile roof. On the left is a threshing barn and hayloft with one storey and a loft, and to the right is a single-storey three-bay cartshed. In the barn is a sliding door and a pitching door, both with quoined surrounds, and slit vents. At the rear are brick piers to the cartshed.	II
Holmlea; 54.20198°N 0.40699°W	—	1819	The house is in variegated brick, and has a pantile roof with coped gables and shaped kneelers. There are two storeys and three bays. The central doorway has a fanlight, the windows are sashes, and all the openings have painted wedge lintels. The date is in tie-plates on the right gable.	II
Welbourn House; 54.20189°N 0.40784°W	—	Early 19th century	A farmhouse and an outbuilding combined into a house, it is in whitewashed chalk with a pantile roof. There are two storeys and three bays. The doorway has pilasters, a fanlight, and a cornice on corbels. The windows are sashes, and the ground floor windows have thin timber lintels.	II
West Flotmanby Farmhouse; 54.20076°N 0.35626°W	—	Early 19th century	The farmhouse is in chalk, faced in brick and stuccoed, with a stepped and dentilled eaves course, and a pantile roof. There are two storeys, two bays, and a double rear range. In the centre is a porch and a recessed doorway with panelled reveals, and a bordered fanlight. The windows are sashes with stone sills and keystones.	II
