= Willerby, North Yorkshire =

Village and civil parish in North Yorkshire, England

Coordinates: 54.1981°N 0.4459°W

Willerby
- Location within North Yorkshire
- Population: 737 (2011 census)
- OS grid reference: TA015795
- Civil parish: Willerby
- Unitary authority: North Yorkshire
- Ceremonial county: North Yorkshire
- Region: Yorkshire and the Humber
- Country: England
- Sovereign state: United Kingdom
- Post town: SCARBOROUGH
- Postcode district: YO12
- Dialling code: 01944
- Police: North Yorkshire
- Fire: North Yorkshire
- Ambulance: Yorkshire
- UK Parliament: Thirsk and Malton

Willerby is a small village and civil parish in North Yorkshire, England. It is contiguous with neighbouring Staxton. The villages of Staxton, Willerby and Binnington make up the civil parish of Willerby.

Until 1974 the village lay in the historic county boundaries of the East Riding of Yorkshire. Between 1974 and 2023 the parish was part of the district of Ryedale. It is now administered by North Yorkshire Council.

According to the 2001 UK census, Willerby parish had a population of 708, increasing to 737 at the 2011 census.

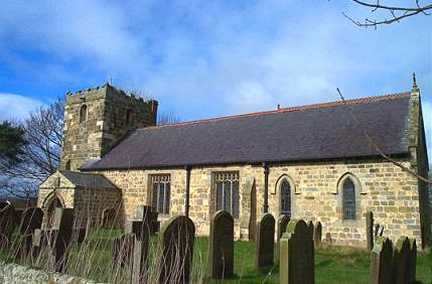
St Peter's Church, Willerby

== See also ==
- Listed buildings in Willerby, North Yorkshire
