= St Peter's Church, Willerby =

Church in North Yorkshire, England

Coordinates: 54.1984°N 0.4558°W

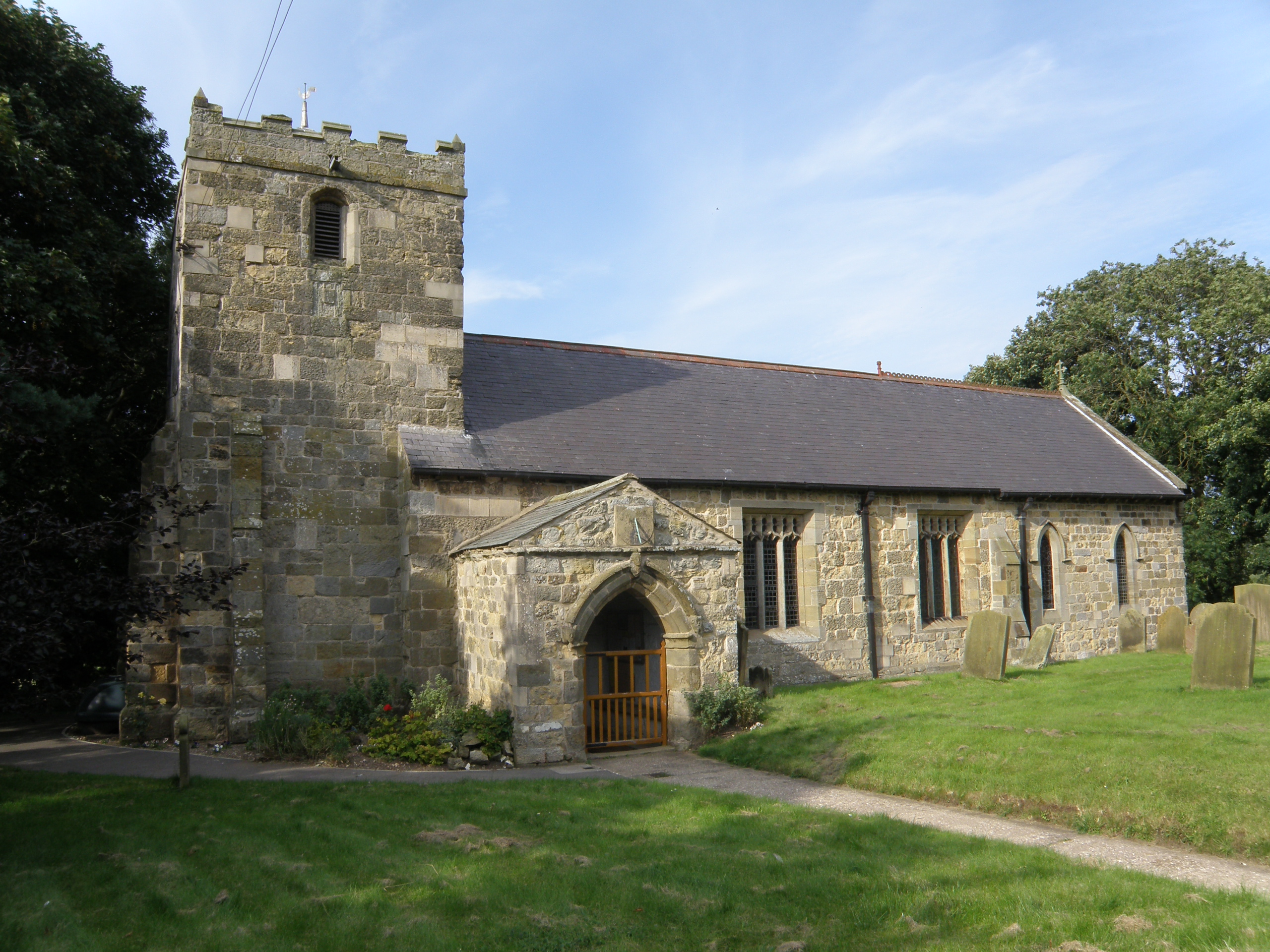
The church, in 2012

St Peter's Church is the parish church of Willerby, North Yorkshire, a village in England.

The church was built in the 13th century, from which period the nave survives. The tower and porch were added in the 14th century. In the 18th century, the north aisle was narrowed, then in the between 1881 and 1882 the church was restored, the work including the rebuilding of the chancel. The church was grade II* listed in 1966.

The church is built of sandstone with a slate roof, and consists of a nave continuous with the chancel, a south porch, a north aisle and a west tower. The tower has buttresses, a three-light west window, a stair turret on the north, and louvred bell openings, above which is a string course and an embattled parapet. The porch is gabled, and contains an arched opening, a hood mould and a keystone carved with a head, and a sundial. Inside, there are 19th-century oil lamps, and stained glass in the east window dating from around 1879.

== See also ==
- Grade II* listed churches in North Yorkshire (district)
- Listed buildings in Willerby, North Yorkshire
