= Fiskerton =

Fiskerton may refer to:

- Fiskerton, Lincolnshire
  - RAF Fiskerton, a Royal Air Force station near the village
- Fiskerton, Nottinghamshire

== See also ==
- Fisherton (disambiguation)
