= Flood's Ferry =

Coordinates: 52.524°N 0.001°W

- Hamlet
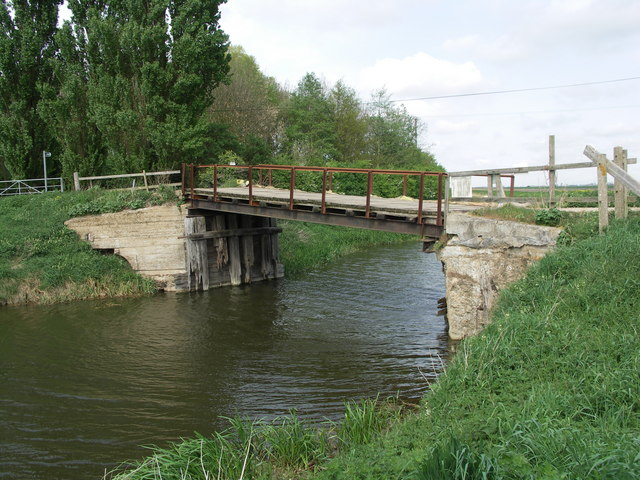
- Bridge at Flood's Ferry.
- Interactive map of Flood's Ferry
- Country: UK
- County: Cambridgeshire

Flood's Ferry and Knight's End are hamlets between Benwick and March, Cambridgeshire, England. Flood's Ferry is the site of a large marina on the old course of the River Nene.
