= Fforddygyfraith =

Coordinates: 51.54°N 03.64°W

- Village
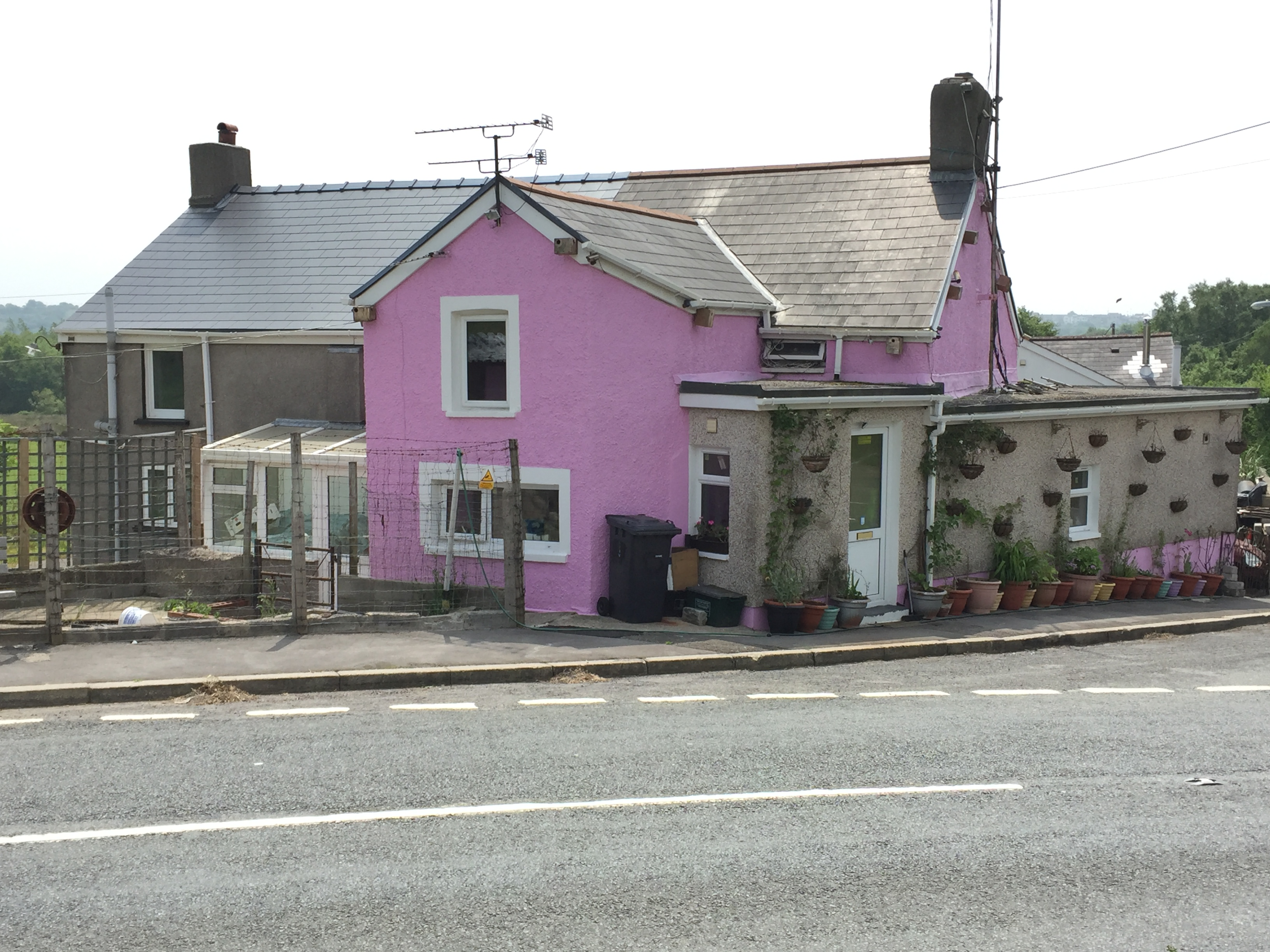
- House in Fforddygyfraith

- Location within Bridgend
- OS grid reference: SS8684
- Principal area: Bridgend
- Preserved county: Mid Glamorgan
- Country: Wales
- Sovereign state: United Kingdom
- Post town: Bridgend
- Postcode district: CF32 0
- Dialling code: 01656
- Police: South Wales
- Fire: South Wales
- Ambulance: Welsh
- UK Parliament: Bridgend
- Senedd Cymru – Welsh Parliament: Ogmore

Fforddygyfraith (also spelt Ffordd-y-gyfraith;) is a village in the community of Cefn Cribwr, in the County Borough of Bridgend. The name translates as Law Street, or The Road of the Law, a reference to the road around which the village was built.

It has a historic chapel, Caersalem Independent Chapel, which has now been converted into housing. Since 2008, one of the farms in Fforddygyfraith has been a family attraction with farm animals and play areas, known as Wiggleys Fun Farm.

National Cycle Route 4 travels through Fforddygyfraith.

== History ==
Historically an area used for farming, the settlement of Fforddygyfraith was established by the 19th century, with a row of five houses at the southern end of the road. The village had a Sunday school, connected with Siloam Chapel in Cefn Cribwr, which later arranged for the construction of a schoolroom in Fforddygyfraith. In 1907, the schoolroom became the site for a new congregational church, Caersalem Independent Chapel, which had 39 founding members, 14 of which were from Ebenezer Church in Aberkenfig. The following year, Edward Davies, pastor of Ebenezer, was inducted as the first pastor, alongside his Aberkenfig ministry.

In the 20th century, the village was extended, with further houses built on the northern section of the road. The village was popular with mining families, due to its proximity to several collieries. The village in this period did not have its own school; children in the village attended school in Cefn Cribwr. It did, though have its own cricket team and a football team, the Foes Bank Rovers. The village also hosted horse races a few times each year, known as the Park Farm Races.

Much of the village was demolished in the 1970s, when the National Coal Board planned to establish an open-cast mine on the site of the village, as part of an extension of their mining operations at Parc Slip. In 1976, the residents of 21 houses received offers from the National Coal Board for the purchase of their properties. One of the houses was owned by Ogwr Borough Council, which opposed the expansion, as did many residents, who formed an Action Committee to protest the proposals. Approval was finally given to the NCB for the extension in April 1979. The houses at the northern end of Fforddygyfraith, known as Upper Law Street, were not demolished. Law Street itself was completely closed from May 1979, but was reopened in November 1990.
