= Edwina Hayes =

Irish singer-songwriter (born 1973)

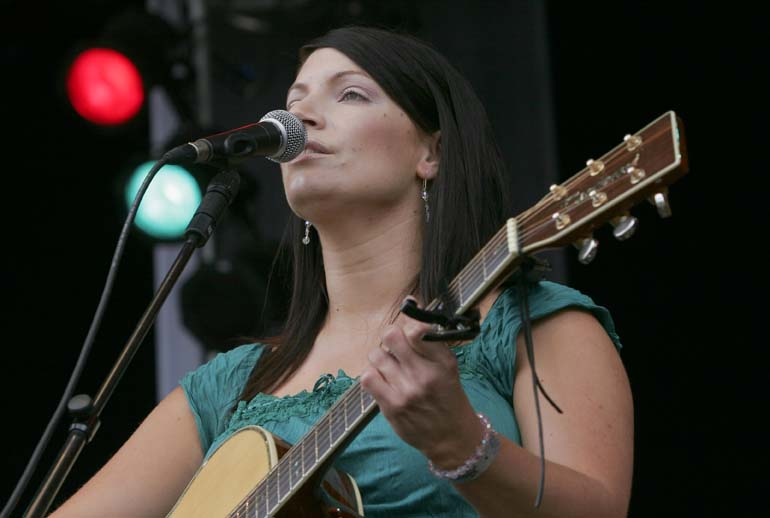
Edwina Hayes at Fairport's Cropredy Convention, 2005

Edwina Hayes (born 6 June 1973, in Dublin, Ireland) is an Irish born English singer-songwriter. She grew up in Preston, Lancashire before moving to the East Riding of Yorkshire where she gained her first musical experiences playing at local folk clubs.

== Solo career ==
Since 1999, she has played regularly in London and Nashville, establishing herself as an accomplished songwriter in the process.

She released her debut album Out on My Own in 2005. The album was co-produced by singer-songwriter Clive Gregson and featured Dr. Hook singer Dennis Locorriere on two tracks. Her single Eyes of a Stranger received regular plays on BBC Radio 2 courtesy of broadcaster Michael Parkinson.

In 2005, she toured extensively as support act to such notable performers as Jools Holland, Nanci Griffith, Ricky Ross and Loudon Wainwright III. In 2006 and 2007 she again supported Nanci Griffith.

Hayes released her second solo album, Pour Me a Drink in February 2008. Released on a small independent label it was a much simpler recording than her debut, most tracks just featuring her voice and guitar. The title track was later recorded by Nanci Griffith.

In 2009, her version of Randy Newman's "Feels Like Home" was featured in the movie My Sister's Keeper. During June 2009 Hayes supported ex-Byrd Roger McGuinn on his British tour.

Her third solo album, Good Things Happen Over Coffee, was released in 2011.

She was a finalist in the Yorkshire Gig Guide Grassroots Awards in the category of "Outstanding Band/Artist" in 2017.

She appeared at the 2021 Shrewsbury Folk Festival.

== Hummingbird ==
In late 2006, she teamed up with fellow singer-songwriters Amy Wadge and Rosalie Deighton under the name of Hummingbird. They toured together and recorded an album, They Don’t Make Mirrors Like They Used To for release in early 2007. Before the album's release Deighton left to concentrate on her solo career and was replaced by Cathy Burton. This change in line up delayed the album's release, now to be called Tougher Than Love release was put back until August. The new line up's touring schedule included an appearance at the 2007 Glastonbury Festival, playing the Acoustic Stage on the final day of the festival.

== The Mile Roses ==
From 2015 to mid 2018, she was a member of The Mile Roses, along with Kate Bramley and Simon Haworth. The Mile Roses toured the United Kingdom extensively and recorded a self-titled album whilst she was a member. Edwina was replaced by Kari Macleod, although she continued to tour with The Mile Roses, performing as a solo artist.

== Personal life ==
Hayes lives in Driffield, East Riding of Yorkshire.

== Discography ==
=== Studio albums ===
- Out on My Own (2004-Feb-28), Radar, RADAR005CD
- Pour Me A Drink (2008-Feb-22) - Twirly Music, TWIRL01CD
- Good Things Happen Over Coffee (2011-Feb-11) - Twirly Music, TWIRL02CD
- Ruby Rose (2021) - Twirly Music, TWIRL03CD

=== With Hummingbird ===
- Tougher Than Love (2007-Jun-25) - Flying Sparks Records, TDBCDA70

=== With The Mile Roses ===
- The Mile Roses (2017-Jul-16) - Tantobie Records, TTRCD116

=== Live album ===
- Moonbeams Presents Edwina Hayes Abbey Road Live Here Now (2014-May-23) – Album recorded live at Driffield Town Hall, then pressed and issued to members of the audience that evening free of charge. A very limited number were available via EdwinaHayes.com.

=== Other appearances ===
- "Froggie Went A Courtin'" (2007) - The School Building – A Cool Compilation of Songs For Kids From Donating Artists Round The World, Lympsham Pre-School, TSB1
- "Feels Like Home" (2009) - Randy Newman cover from My Sister's Keeper Soundtrack, Decca Records, 271 0651
- "This Be The Verse" (2010-Jun-10) - All Night North – Songs To Words By Philip Larkin, ANN-CD1
