= Staxtonbury Music Festival =

Music festival in Staxton, Scarborough

- Genre: World, Folk
- Dates: First weekend of July
- Locations: Staxton, Scarborough, UK
- Years active: 2009–present
- Website: www.staxtonbury.co.uk

The Staxtonbury Family Music Festival, commonly abbreviated to Staxtonbury, is a local British music festival, held every year at Staxton, near Scarborough, North Yorkshire, best known for its break through local music acts.

The festival has run since 2009, and has been very successful, not just with local people but a wider audience.

The size and nature of the festival, held over three or four days in the open air, with performers, crew and paying festival goers staying in tents, caravans and motorhomes, has meant that the weather is significant. It is now attended by around 5,000 annually.

== Lineups ==
=== Artists ===
2011

- My Forever
- Stray Scene
- Shamrockers
- Attic Noise
- Blue Alibi
- The Shamrockers
- Big Me
- Amber Carey
- Stairwell 17
- The Grand Urge
- Rebecca Arundale

=== 2012 ===
Staxtonbury IV 2012 was held on Friday 6, Saturday 7, and Sunday 8 July 2012.

=== 2013 ===
The fifth festival saw 77 acts perform over three days - between the 5 and 7 July 2013.

=== 2015 ===
Staxtonbury VII (2015) was held from 3–5 July 2015.

=== Artists ===
- The Sherlocks
- Shamrockers
- Snatch
- Huge
- Friday Street
- Qwikshift
- Kast Off Kinks
- Bogus Beatles
- Soul Rida
- Aftermath
- Another Manhattan
- Trilogy
- TFI
- Dustin the Blues

=== 2016 ===
The 8th festival was held from 2–4 July 2016.

=== 2017 ===
Staxtonbury IX was held from 7–9 July 2017.

=== 2018 ===
The festival was held between 6 and 8 July, over 40 acts appeared. Including local celebrity and presenter Ryan Swain.

=== 2019 ===
The 11th festival was held from 4–6 July in 2019. It had four stages and featured performances on the main stage from Soul Rida, Boomin, Huge, Friday Street and DJ's Callum Russell and Ryan Swain. The festival had completely sold out of online ticket sales for the Saturday.

== See also ==
- Staxton
- Glastonbury
- List of music festivals in the United Kingdom
