= Folkton =

Village in England

Coordinates: 54°12′09″N 0°23′03″W

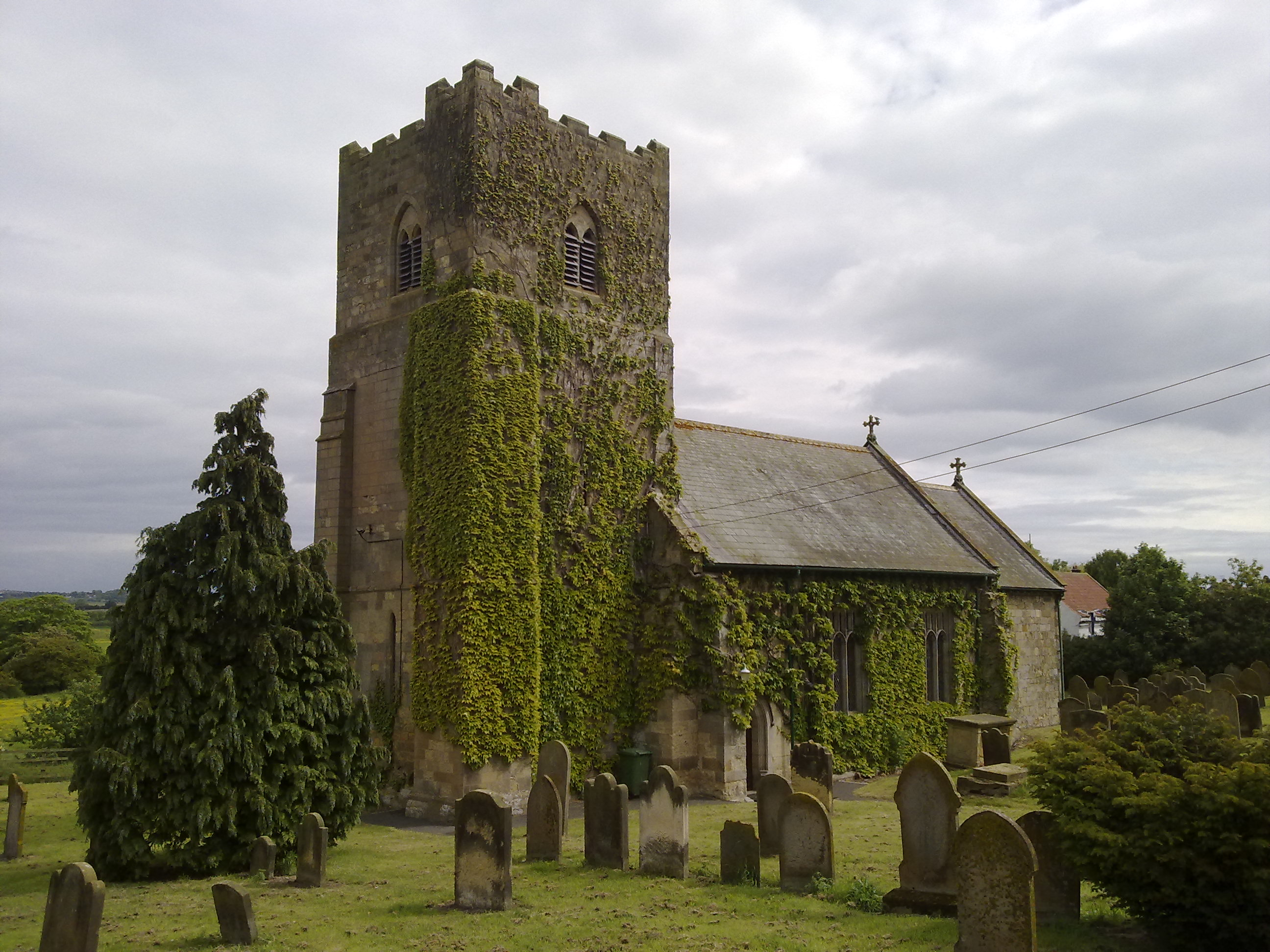
- Church of St John the Evangelist, Folkton

- Location within North Yorkshire
- Population: 535 (2011 census)
- OS grid reference: TA054797
  - London: 185 mi (298 km) S
- Civil parish: Folkton
- Unitary authority: North Yorkshire
- Ceremonial county: North Yorkshire
- Region: Yorkshire and the Humber
- Country: England
- Sovereign state: United Kingdom
- Post town: SCARBOROUGH
- Postcode district: YO11
- Police: North Yorkshire
- Fire: North Yorkshire
- Ambulance: Yorkshire
- UK Parliament: Thirsk and Malton

Folkton is a small village and civil parish at the foot of the Yorkshire Wolds and on the edge of the Vale of Pickering on an area known as Folkton Carr (carr meaning low lands) in North Yorkshire, England.

Until 1974 the village lay in the historic county boundaries of the East Riding of Yorkshire. From 1974 to 2023 it was part of the Borough of Scarborough, it is now administered by the unitary North Yorkshire Council.

St John's Church, Folkton was built in the 12th century. Folkton House, the former rectory is located on Filey Road. Towards Flixton is the former village school which is now closed, built in 1832.

According to the 2011 UK Census, Folkton parish had a population of 535, an increase on the 2001 UK Census figure of 461.

== Geography ==
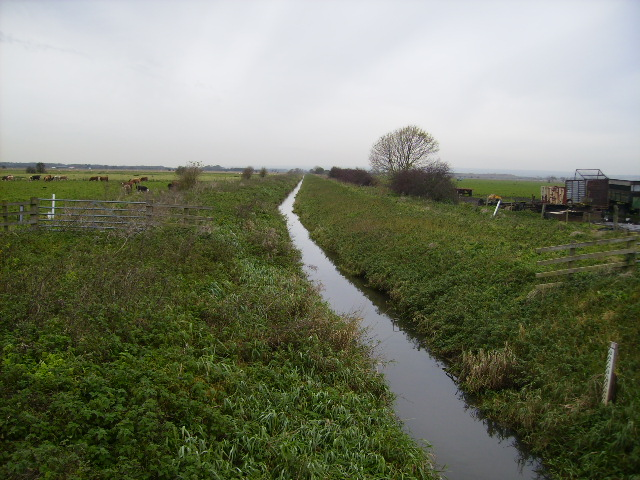
Folkton Carr, north of Folkton; as with neighbouring Flixton Carr, once this was fenland and earlier still lay below Lake Pickering

To the south are the Wolds and further north, across the Carrs and up the hills at the other side of the Vale is Scarborough, beyond which to the north-west are the Yorkshire Moors.

== History ==
=== Prehistoric features ===
The area has been settled for many thousands of years. Above the village, at the top of Folkton Hill, was where the Folkton Drums were discovered. They are a set of chalk (the predominant stone in the area) carvings from the Stone Age. Bowl-shaped, they have been called drums as the carvings would be upside down were they to be used as bowls. They were discovered by William Greenwell in 1889. They were buried in a tumulus that sits at the intersection of several natural pathways through the Dales. This tumulus has now been identified as one of a network that acted as a guide through the maze of hills and valleys that make up the Dales which would have been heavily forested at the time. They can now be seen on display at the British Museum.

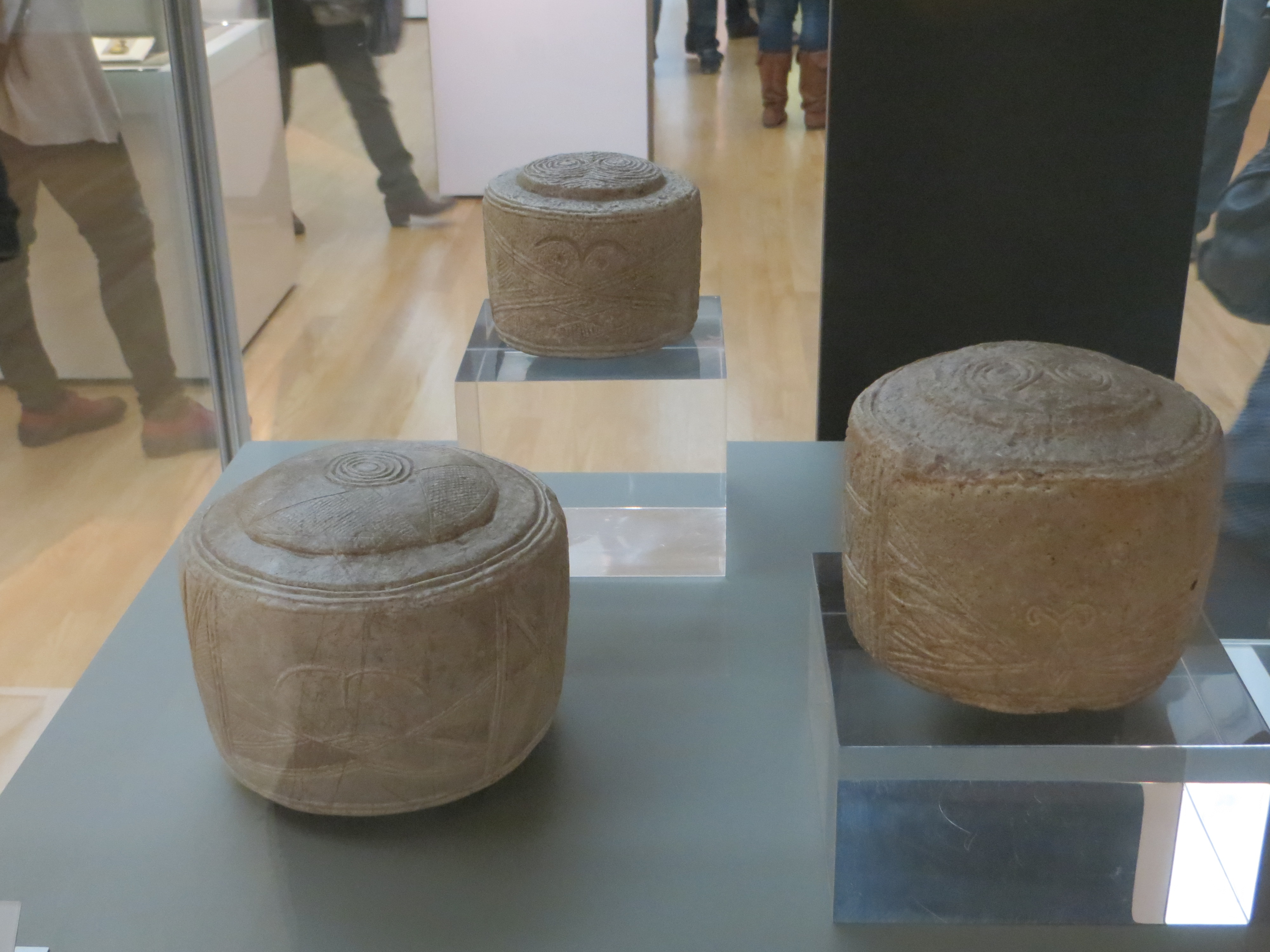
Prehistoric Folkton Drums displayed in the British Museum

=== Modern history ===
The Carr would have historically been lake or marsh depending on which climatic era is being discussed. Its natural state today would be as marsh land but it was drained in the 19th century to make room for agriculture.

The village was also the site of a Roman military base. Not much is known of this stage as subsequent building works have destroyed any archaeology; however, the regular finds of Roman artefacts such as coins and arrow heads indicate a substantial presence.

The village as it stands today was established with a small number of farm houses around 400 years ago. Later building added to and expanded these existing structures into larger houses and farms with attached barns. Many barns were then demolished during the 1800s to avoid the 'Roof Tax'.

In 1823 the Folkton parish was in the Wapentake of Dickering. Population at the time was 144. Occupations included three farmers, and the landlady of The Bell public house. Two miles to the west of the village, in the Folkton parish, and separated by one mile, were the settlements of East and West Flotmanby, each listed with a gentleman.

== See also ==
- Listed buildings in Folkton
