= Flixton, North Yorkshire =

Village in North Yorkshire, England

Coordinates: 54.202°N 0.405°W

Flixton
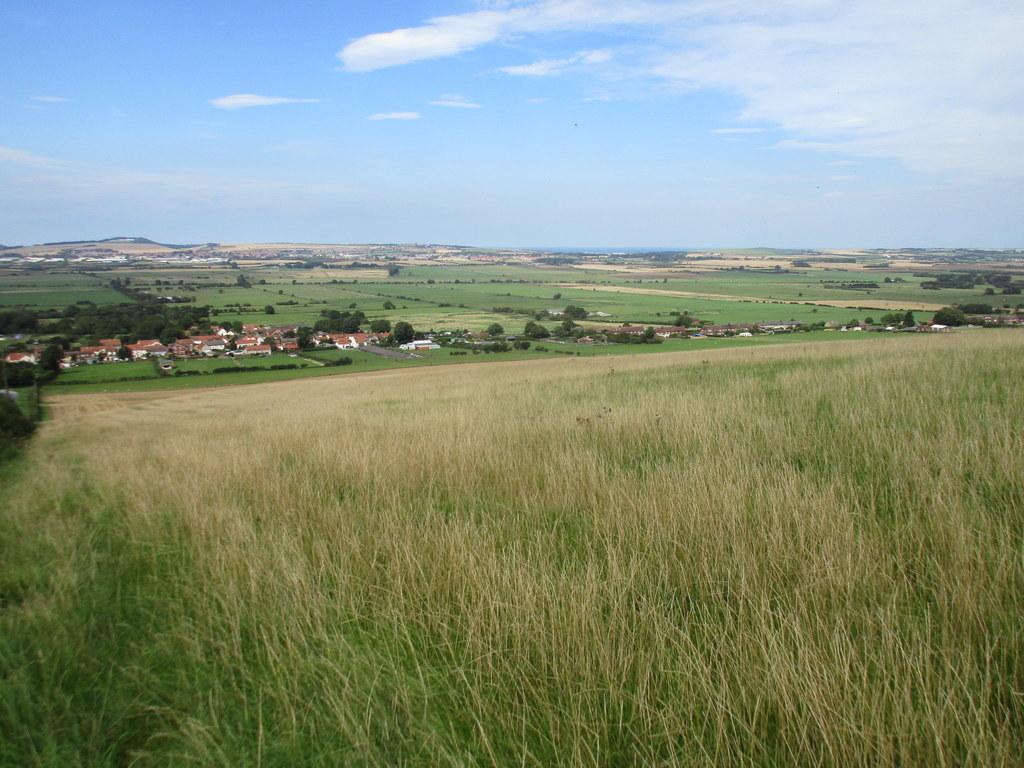
- View of the village from Flixton Brow

- Location within North Yorkshire
- OS grid reference: TA041796
- Civil parish: Folkton
- Unitary authority: North Yorkshire
- Ceremonial county: North Yorkshire
- Region: Yorkshire and the Humber
- Country: England
- Sovereign state: United Kingdom
- Post town: SCARBOROUGH
- Postcode district: YO11
- Police: North Yorkshire
- Fire: North Yorkshire
- Ambulance: Yorkshire
- UK Parliament: Thirsk and Malton

Flixton is a village in North Yorkshire, England, on the edge of the Yorkshire Wolds.

Until 1974 the village lay in the East Riding of Yorkshire. From 1974 to 2023 it was part of the Borough of Scarborough; it is now administered by the unitary North Yorkshire Council.

At the 2011 Census, the population of the village was recorded in that of the entire Folkton Parish, which had 535 residents.

The village is on the A1039 road, which runs between the A64 (at Staxton) and the A165 (at Filey). It is 4 miles (6.4 km) north-west of Hunmanby, and 1.5 miles (2.4 km) west of Folkton. Historically, its nearest railway station was at Ganton on the York to Scarborough line, but this closed in 1930. The nearest railway station now is at Seamer, 4.3 miles (7 km) to the north.

== History ==
The area is known to have been settled by humans in the Mesolithic era, roughly 15,000 to 5,000 BP. Evidence of Mesolithic settlers exists at nearby Star Carr, and the post-glacial watercourse of Lake Flixton, which was north of the village. Archaeological excavations in the area have discovered ceremonial mace-heads made from pebble, flints, and ochre crayons believed to be 10,000 years old.

During the reign of Æthelstan (924-939), a hospital was built in the settlement "for the preservation of persons travelling that way, that they might not be destroyed by wolves and other wild beasts then abounding in that neighbourhood..." The hospital possessed a chapel and was rebuilt in 1447, though by 1535 it had been abandoned and farmland now occupies the site.

Flixton is mentioned in the Domesday Book as Fleustone, having three villagers, 37 ploughlands, and one church. The name derives from Old English Flikstūn ("Flik's settlement or estate"), incorporating an Old Norse personal name.

== Amenities ==
Most amenities, post office, shop and bus service, have been lost in the 2010s. The local pub also serves as a fish and chip shop.

Folkton & Flixton C.C., the local cricket club, for the villages of Flixton and Folkton, won the national Village Cup at Lord's in 2018.

== See also ==
- Listed buildings in Folkton
- Star Carr
