= Jake Morley =

British singer-songwriter (born 1983)

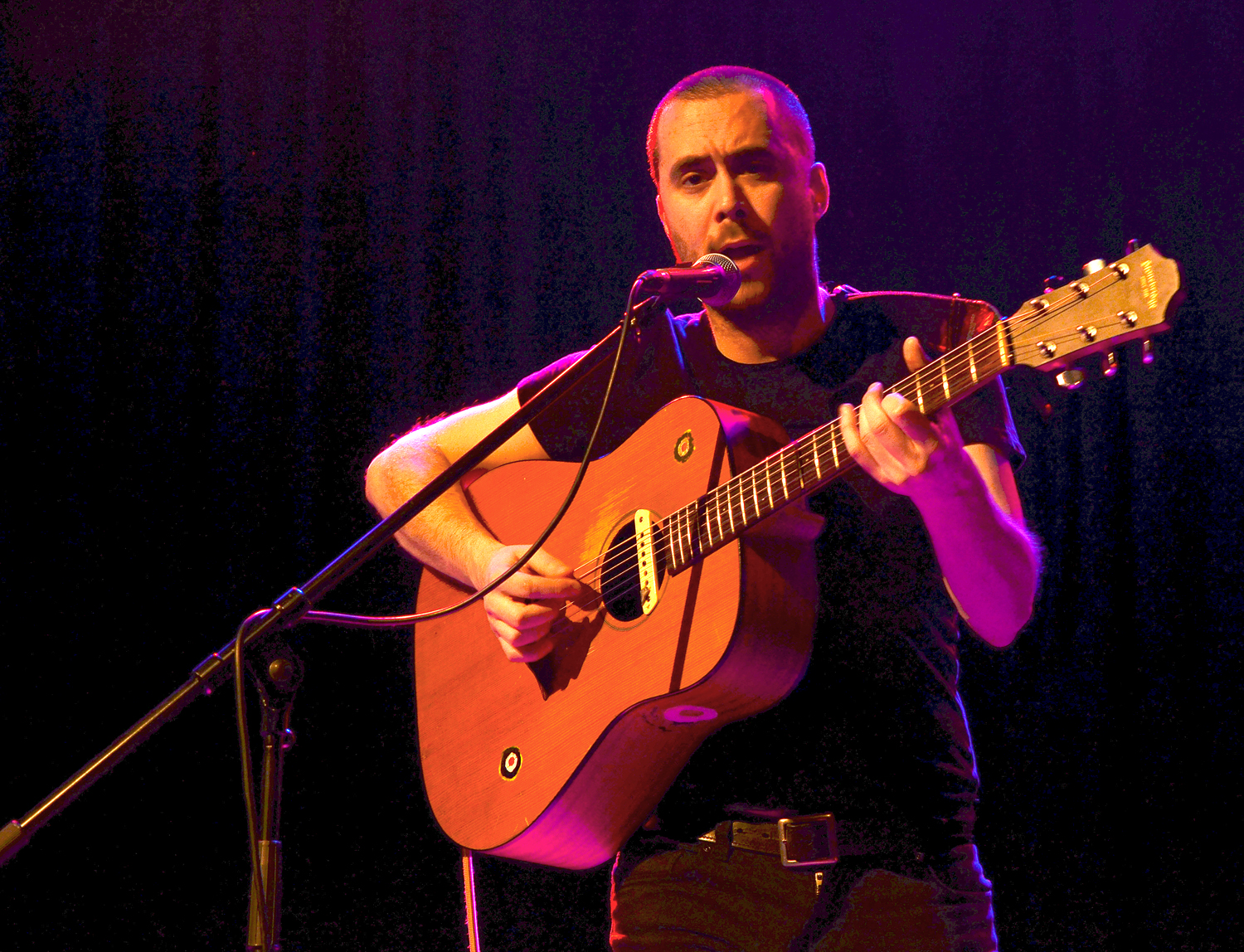
- Jake Morley performing at The Citadel, St Helens in April 2015. Photograph by Andrew D. Hurley

Background information
- Origin: London, England
- Genres: Folk, acoustic, indie
- Occupations: Singer, songwriter
- Instruments: Vocals, guitar
- Years active: 2008–present
- Label: Sandwich Emporium Records (2011–present)
- Website: jakemorley.com

Jake Morley (born 1 August 1983) is a British singer-songwriter, based in north London.

== Early life ==
Morley grew up in Mill Hill, London. He learned guitar at an early age and began writing songs whilst at Mill Hill County High School in north west London. After studying law at the University of Nottingham for three years, Morley returned to London and started performing on the London open mic scene.

=== 2008–2009 ===
Morley began recording in 2008, and released of his first EP, This City later the same year. A popular artist on the London circuit, Morley played the MS Calling charity gig at the 100 Club where he met double bassist John Parker (formerly of Nizlopi), drummer Harry Mead and sound engineer Phill Brown (Bob Marley / Talk Talk / Faithless) who recorded and co-produced Morley's debut album. Also in attendance was Calum MacColl (Rokia Traore / Ronan Keating / Eddi Reader) who played guitar on and also co-produced the album.

=== 2010 – Many Fish To Fry ===
In January 2010 Morley, along with Phill Brown and Calum MacColl, started recording Many Fish To Fry. With recording, mixing and over dubs continuing for a few months. Morley returned to live performances in March.

In April 2010 secured a residency at Ronnie Scott's playing once a month all the way through to December.

Towards the end of 2010, Morley joined forces with Kerry Harvey-Piper, of Red Grape Records who took on the role of being his manager.

=== 2011 ===
Morley's debut album Many Fish To Fry was released in February 2011 on his own independent label. After a short UK tour, Morley held his album launch party at London's Bush Hall, where his performance received much critical acclaim.

In March 2011, Morley's debut single 'Feet Don't Fail Me Now' was played on Dermot O'Leary's Saturday afternoon BBC Radio 2 show. On 5 May Morley headlined the City Showcase after party at the 100 Club and later performed a live set on Janice Long's show. Janice Long recommended 'Feet Don't Fail Me Now' as the featured live track of the week on Jo Whiley's Radio 2 Live in Concert.

=== YouTube ===
Morley's video for 'This City' was included in a Best Guitarist on the Web video created by ITN.

=== 2013–2015 ===
Morley spent more than two years writing and recording his second album, The Manual, which was funded in part by a Pledge Music Campaign. It was produced by Calum MacColl (son of Peggy Seeger and Ewan MacColl and half brother to Kirsty MacColl) and released in September 2015.

=== Later career and new releases (2016–present) ===
Following his second album "The Manual" (2016), Morley continued to release music independently. His third studio album, "Some Things Are Like Other Things" was released on 28 October 2022. Between these major releases, he issued several singles and EPs, including the digital EP "Tell It To Me Straight" (2020) and singles such as "No Drama (Live at Lovebird Studios)" (2020) and "I Hope That I Can Make It Before We Have a Baby" (2018).

=== Reviews ===
He is certainly something else! Very Charismatic, warm and a fantastic singer and guitar player.

— Janice Long, Radio 2

Jake Morley and his impressive band more than have what it takes… an ambitious pop sound that is every bit as bright and sparkly as the main player himself – 4 stars

— The Independent

A sound that can't be ignored. Morley can do no wrong, and a wealth of fans can't get enough. 9/10

— Virgin.com

Great real life lyrics and superb virtuoso playing. That's extraordinary!

— Tom Robinson, 6 music

Jake Morley is not just your average bloke with guitar, he stuns crowds with his unique style and is always a show stealer.

— BBC Introducing

It's phenomenal to watch him but it's still more daunting to consider that he also sings up a storm and writes cracking songs. Morley is a true original

— Acoustic Magazine

This is a man to follow, not just on social media sites, but in real life whenever he plays a gig. This is music to cherish.

— Music Riot

=== Luke Haines Power Trio ===
Morley plays bass guitar in the live band of Luke Haines when the former leader of The Auteurs performs as "The Luke Haines Power Trio".

== Discography ==
=== Extended plays ===
Year	Title
2008	This City E.P

=== Albums ===
Year	Title
2011	Many Fish To Fry
2016	The Manual
2022	Some Things Are Like Other Things

=== Singles ===
Year	Single	Peak positions		Album
2011	"Feet Don't Fail Me Now"	–	–	Many Fish To Fry
2014	"Falter"	–	–	The Manual
2015	"Ghostess"	–	–	The Manual
