= Ffynnon-ddrain =

Hamlet in Carmarthenshire, Wales

Coordinates: 51°52′13″N 004°03′28″W

Ffynnon-ddrain is a settlement in Carmarthenshire, Wales, one mile north-west of the town of Carmarthen, 24 miles north-west of the major city of Swansea, 56 miles north-west of Cardiff, and 182 miles west of London.

Ffynnon-ddrain was historically in the county of Carmarthenshire. It is situated nearby to Cwmoernant and Quarry Cottage.

The village is home to Elim Welsh Independent Chapel.

== See also ==
- Carmel, Gwynedd
- Llandeilo
- Llangathen
