= Fisherton Station =

Fisherton Station could refer to

- Antártida Argentina railway station in Rosario, Santa Fe, Argentina, which was known as Fisherton Station until 1948
- Salisbury railway station in Wiltshire, England, located on Fisherton Street.
