= Fluxton =

Hamlet in Devon, England

Coordinates: 50.728°N 3.295°W

- Hamlet
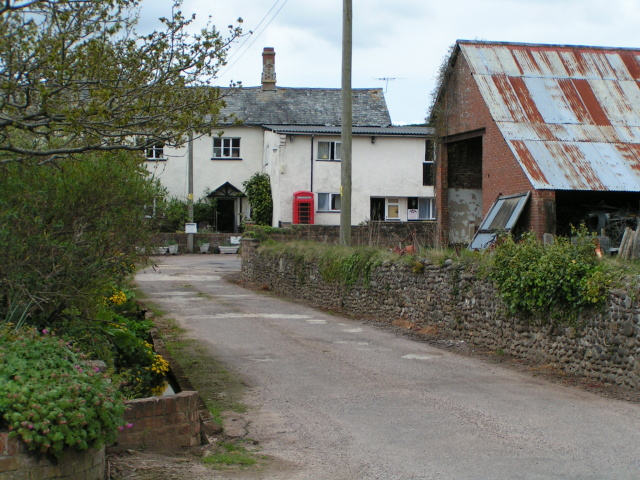
- A small lane in Fluxton
- Interactive map of Fluxton
- Sovereign state: United Kingdom
- Constituent country: England
- Region: South West England
- Non-metropolitan county: Devon
- Non-metropolitan district: East Devon

Population (2017)
  - Total: 99
- Time zone: UTC0 (GMT)
  - Summer (DST): UTC+1 (BST)

Fluxton is a hamlet situated in the Otter Valley, East Devon. It is made up predominantly of old farmhouses and new barn conversions and has a population of approximately 99.

== Fluxton Football Club ==
Fluxton Football Club was founded in 2012 by brothers Alex and Oliver Paget. FFC play their home games at Tipton St John in the Devon and Exeter Football League. The club won its first match 5–1 against the Tipton St John Reserves.

Fluxton FC were promoted in their first season from Division 7 to 6 after finishing 2nd in the league and were promoted again the following year and will start the 2014/15 season in Division 5.

During the season, player-manager Chris Sercombe adopted a 3-5-2 formation, with the team employing a high-pressing, possession-based style of play. A late run of results resulted in the club's promotion. The club's founders, the Paget brothers, have also emphasised fair play as part of the club's approach.

Fluxton FC were crowned Devon and Exeter Football League 2014/15 Division 5 Champions on Saturday 25 April after beating Sandford FC 0–6 away taking the title by one point from Honiton Town 2nd who finished their season prior to the final weekend. In a club statement, the Fluxton official said a big thanks to all the fans, players and everyone involved at the club as the champagne was sprayed in the background. "Fluxton are only one of a few teams that since their creation in 2012 have had promotion after promotion and this league title is only fitting to the Fluxton way".

=== Honours ===
- Devon & Exeter League Division 7 - Runners Up 2012/13
- Devon & Exeter League Division 6 - 8th place Promotion 2013/14
- Devon & Exeter League Division 5 - Winners 2014/15
- Devon & Exeter League Division 4 - 7th place

=== Players ===
- GK Matt Sercombe
- DF Lee Chapman
- DF Chris Sercombe
- DF Tristan Long
- DF John Ashley
- DF Andrew Butcher
- DF Rob Ashman
- DF Theo Burgess
- DF/MF Andi Davies
- MF Alex Paget
- MF Graham Hughes
- MF Simon Durrant
- MF Olly Paget
- MF Rob Hart
- MF James Godfrey
- MF Rich Rapps
- FW Matt Clothier-Smith
- FW Nathan Devereux
- FW Tom Rapps
- ST Hayden Figures
- ST James Santer
