= Fisherton, Highland =

Coordinates: 57.53416°N 4.08468°W

Fisherton
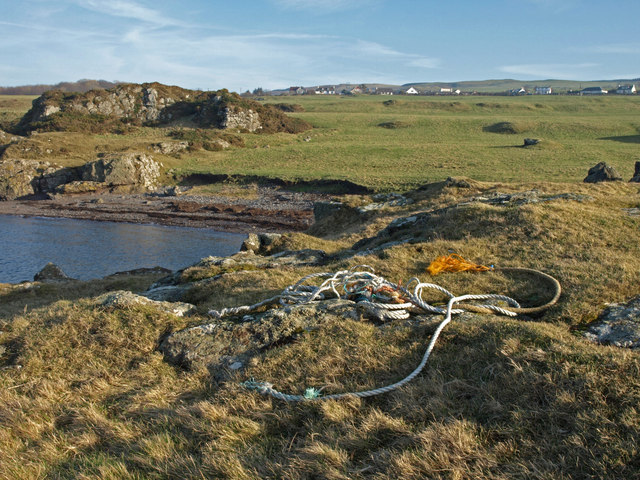
- The former fishing village of Fisherton in the distance.

- Location within the Inverness area
- OS grid reference: NH752512
- Council area: Highland
- Country: Scotland
- Sovereign state: United Kingdom
- Post town: Dalcross
- Postcode district: IV2 7
- Police: Scotland
- Fire: Scottish
- Ambulance: Scottish

Fisherton is a small coastal hamlet, overlooking the Moray Firth, and situated 3 miles northeast of Inverness in Inverness-shire, Scottish Highlands and is in the Scottish council area of Highland.
