= Flodday, Loch Maddy =

Island in the Outer Hebrides, Scotland

Flodday
Flodaigh (Gaelic)
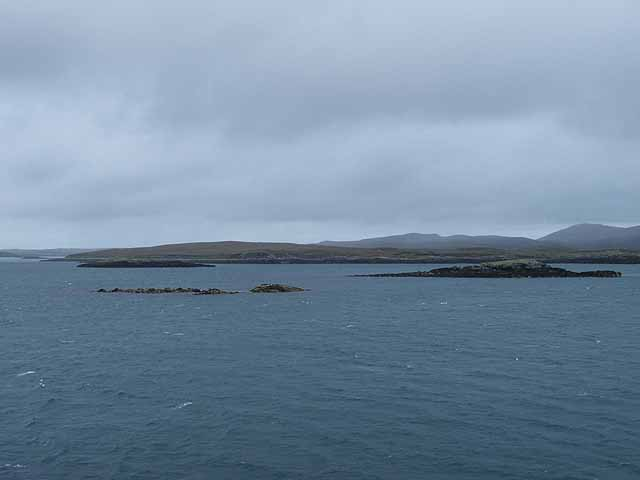
- Flodday from the south with the hills east of Loch Portain, North Uist beyond

Location
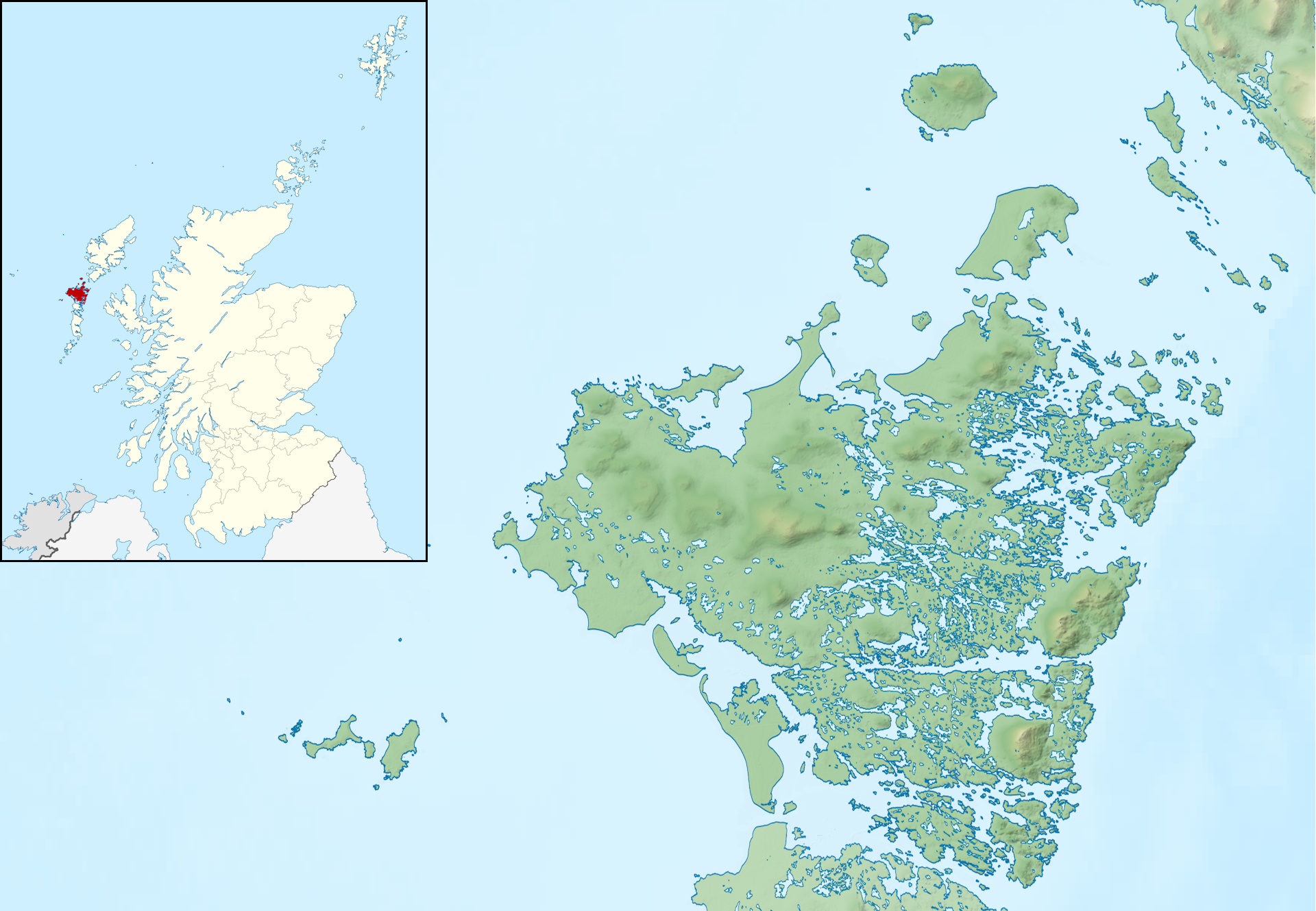
- Flodday shown next to North Uist Flodday shown within the Outer Hebrides
- OS grid reference: NF941696
- Coordinates: 57.613°N 7.126°W

Name
- Name meaning: 'raft' or 'float' island, from Old Norse
- Old Norse name: Flot-øy

Physical geography
- Island group: Uists and Barra
- Area: 50 hectares (0.19 sq mi)
- Area rank: 199=
- Highest elevation: 25 m (82 ft)

Administration
- Council area: Na h-Eileanan Siar
- Country: Scotland
- Sovereign state: United Kingdom

Demographics
- Population: 0

Flodday (Scottish Gaelic: Flodaigh) is an uninhabited island in Loch Maddy, North Uist in the Outer Hebrides of Scotland.

The area of the island is recorded as 50 hectares (124 acres) in Rick Livingstone's tables, although it is not listed by Hamish Haswell-Smith in his tabulation of Scottish islands greater in size than 40 hectares (99 acres). No reason for this is given and his area calculation presumably provided a figure smaller than this total.

Loch Maddy contains a bewildering profusion of islands and islets. To the north west lie the smaller island of Fearamas and the complex island of Cliasaigh Mor/Cliasaigh Beag. The entrance to the sea loch is to the south east where lie the waters of The Minch. The village of Lochmaddy is to the west on the far side of the loch. Flodday is separated from North Uist by the narrows of Caolas Loch Portain.

The coastline is described as "lag boulders and gravel intertidal areas" to the north, east and west and rock or rock platform in the south and south east.

== Folklore and stories ==
The Carmichael Watson Project records a brief story concerning a great northern diver. Kenneth MacLean, a local merchant, describes his sighting of this bird, at Flodday in 1884. Although he was familiar with the species it was the sole occasion on which he had seen it in flight. He recorded that "the wings went rapidly and the bird seemed to exert himself greatly". The island is also referred to in the Notebook of Alexander Carmichael, which contains material collected between October 1867 and December 1885.

The freshwater Loch na Beiste lies just beyond Caolas Loch Portain not far from the shore of North Uist. It was reputedly the haunt of a sea-cow.
