= Mount Pleasant, Peterhead =

Historic building in Lancashire, England

Mount Pleasant
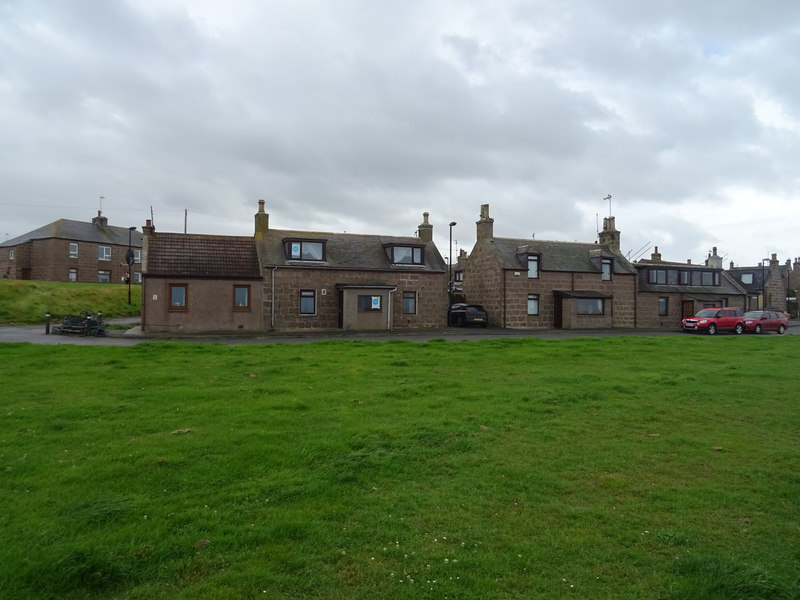
- Mount Pleasant is the house on the right in this 2020 view

- Location within the United Kingdom Location within Scotland
- 57.515123°N 1.7875300°W
- Location: Peterhead, Aberdeenshire, Scotland

Mount Pleasant is a building in Buchanhaven, Aberdeenshire, Scotland. Standing at 5 Harbour Street, the building is named for a fort which formerly stood nearby. It is the former home of local fisherman and poet Peter Buchan (1917–1991).
