= Itchycoo =

Itchycoo may refer to:

- "Itchycoo Park", 1967 song by the Small Faces
- Itchy Coo, an imprint of Scottish publisher Black & White Publishing
- Itchycoo (duo), a Swedish pop duo consisting of Tobias Gustavsson and Mia Bergström
