= Colin Mark =

British teacher, lexicographer and writer in Scottish Gaelic

Colin Mark (1936–2020) was a British teacher, lexicographer and writer on the linguistics of Scottish Gaelic. He was the author of three books, a number of articles as well as short stories published in the Gaelic language quarterly Gairm.

After study at Peterhead Academy Colin Mark achieved an undergraduate degree in classics from the University of Aberdeen. He taught for nearly 40 years in a number of schools in the south-east and north-east of Scotland.

His Gaelic Verbs Systemised and Simplified (2006) received widespread praise including from Ruairidh MacIlleathain, BBC Alba journalist and writer, who praised the book's attention to idiom.

An updated and expanded third edition of 'Gaelic Verbs' will be published in late 2024 by Waterfront Books.

His Gaelic to English Dictionary (2002) is one of a small number of Scottish Gaelic dictionaries in the modern era and has received praise for its practical and user friendly nature. David Stifter, who reviewed the dictionary in Language the journal of the Linguistic Society of America praised the dictionary's comprehensiveness, including over 90,000 entries gathered from twenty years of study, in his opinion unparalleled except by older dictionaries by Edward Dwelly and Malcolm MacLennan. The dictionary was also recommended by Victor Price.

== Works ==
=== Books ===
- Gaelic Verbs. Glasgow University Press (Roinn nan Cànan Ceilteach Oilthigh Ghlaschu) 1986. ISBN 0903204169
- The Gaelic-English Dictionary. Routledge 2002 ISBN 9780415297608 (hardback) ISBN 9780415297615 (paperback)
- Gaelic Verbs Systemised and Simplified. Steve Savage Publishers 2006 ISBN 9781904246138
- Mark, Colin (2013). Scottish Gaelic: An Essential Grammar. Taylor & Francis Group. ISBN 978-0-415-53465-9.

=== Short stories ===
Short stories (in Gaelic) by Colin Mark include:

- "Smuaintean ann an Taigh-seinnse" (Thoughts in a Pub) Gairm 127 (1984)
- "Liombo" (Limbo) Gairm 133 (1985)
- "Ath-thilleadh Fhearghuis" (Fergus Returns) Gairm 136 (1986)
- "An Ioma-shlighe" (The Labyrinth) Gairm 143 (1988)
- "Craobh an t-Saoghail" (Tree of the World) Gairm 152 (1990)
