= Scottish Gaelic dictionaries =

The history of Scottish Gaelic dictionaries goes back to the early 17th century. The high-point of Gaelic dictionary production was in the first half of the 19th century, as yet unrivalled even by modern developments in the late 20th and early 21st century. The majority of dictionaries published to date have been Gaelic to English dictionaries.

== Vocabularies ==
The first precursors of true Gaelic dictionaries were the vocabularies, often little less than wordlists, which made their first appearance in 1702 with Rev. Robert Kirk's wordlist, an appendix to William Nicolson's Scottish Historical Library. Edward Lhuyd's Scottish field work between 1699–1700 contained substantial wordlists for Argyll and Inverness-shire dialects which, however, were not published until much later.

Some 40 years later, the Society in Scotland for Propagating Christian Knowledge published a title called Leabhar a Theagasc Ainminnin ("A book for the teaching of names") in 1741, compiled by Alasdair mac Mhaighstir Alasdair.

Timeline

- 1702 The Scottish Historical Library by W. Nicolson, containing on p. 334–346 A Vocabulary of the Irish Dialect, spoken by the Highlanders of Scotland; collected by Mr. Kirk
- 1699–1700 Fieldwork by Edward Lhuyd
- 1741 Leabhar a Theagasc Ainminnin / A Galick an English vocabulary

== Dictionaries ==
=== 18th and 19th centuries ===
The first dictionary in the modern sense was published in 1780 by the Rev. William Shaw, the Galic and English Dictionary, which contained a large percentage of Irish terms. This was quickly followed by Robert MacFarlane's small-scale dictionary, Nuadh Fhoclair Gaidhlig agus Beurla ("New Gaelic and English dictionary") in 1795. Exactly 10 years later Peter MacFarlane, a translator of religious publications published the first bidirectional dictionary in 1815, the New English and Gaelic Vocabulary - Focalair Gaelig agus Beurla.

Although the Highland Society of Scotland had set up a committee in 1806 to produce a full-scale dictionary, but was beaten by Robert Armstrong who published his Gaelic Dictionary in 1825, followed three years later by the Highland Society's dictionary in 1828 entitled Dictionarium Scoto-Celticum - A Dictionary of the Gaelic Language I & II.

Various other dictionaries followed, most notably Alexander Macbain's Etymological Dictionary of the Gaelic Language in 1896, to date the only such publication in Gaelic.

A number of dictionaries from this period exist which have not been published to date, such as the Highland Gentleman's Dictionary from c. 1776 which is currently in the Countess of Sutherland's library.

Timeline

- 1780 Galic and English Dictionary by Rev. William Shaw
- 1795 Nuadh Fhoclair Gaidhlig agus Beurla = A New Alphabetical Vocabulary, Gailic and English by Robert MacFarlane - (digitised version at National Library of Scotland)
- 1815 New English and Gaelic Vocabulary - Focalair Gaelig agus Beurla by Peter MacFarlane
- 1825 Gaelic Dictionary by Robert Archibald Armstrong - (digitised version at National Library of Scotland)
- 1828 Dictionarium Scoto-Celticum - A Dictionary of the Gaelic Language I & II - (digitised version at National Library of Scotland)
- 1831 A Dictionary of the Gaelic Language by Dr Norman MacLeod and Dr Daniel Dewar - (Glasgow, 1833: digitised version at National Library of Scotland)
- 1832 Pronouncing Gaelic Dictionary by Neil MacAlpine
- 1842 Gaelic-English Dictionary by Father Ewen MacEachan (based on MacLeod & Dewar); 4th edition in 1922
- 1845 Pronouncing Gaelic Dictionary with additions by John MacKenzie
- 1896 An Etymological Dictionary of the Gaelic Language by Alexander Macbain; a later edition in 1911

=== 20th century ===
The 20th century in Gaelic lexicography was ushered in by the publication of Edward Dwelly's Illustrated Gaelic English Dictionary, which was partly based on a previous dictionary but supplemented by extensive material from other sources and Dwelly's own fieldwork. It remains the dictionary seen as the most authoritative to this day. Various other small to medium dictionaries followed.

Timeline

- 1901 Illustrated Gaelic English Dictionary by Edward Dwelly (based partly on MacLeod & Dewar)
- 1912 Am Briathrachan Beag by Malcolm MacFarlane
- 1925 Gaelic Dictionary by Malcolm MacLennan
- 1932 Pronouncing Dictionary of Scottish Gaelic by Henry Cyril Dieckhoff
- 1958 Gaelic Words and Expressions from South Uist and Eriskay by Rev. Allan MacDonald
- 1979 Abair Facail, a pocket-dictionary by John MacDonald and Ronald Renton
- 1981 The New English-Gaelic Dictionary by Derick Thomson
- 1991 Appendix to Dwelly's Gaelic-English Dictionary by Douglas Clyne (ed.)
- 1991 Brìgh nam Facal, a dictionary for schools by Prof Richard Cox
- 1993 The Modern Gaelic-English Dictionary by Robert C. Owen
- 1998 Gaelic-English English-Gaelic Dictionary, a pocket dictionary by Dougal Buchanan

=== 21st century ===
Following Dwelly's dictionary, essentially no new large-scale dictionaries were published until the 21st century with the appearance of Colin B.D. Mark 's substantial Gaelic English Dictionary in 2003.

The first substantial English to Gaelic dictionary of the 21st century was the Faclair Beag ("Little Dictionary") by Michael Bauer and Will Robertson. The Faclair Beag is an online dictionary which appeared in two stages, first with a digital version of Edward Dwelly's dictionary early in 2009 and soon thereafter with a modern dictionary later that year, by now containing more than 85,000 entries.

Timeline

- 2001 The Essential Gaelic-English Dictionary by Angus Watson
- 2001 The Essential English-Gaelic Dictionary by Angus Watson
- 2003 The Gaelic-English Dictionary by Colin Mark
- 2004 Gaelic Dictionary (Teach Yourself) by Ian MacDonald and Boyd Robertson
- 2009 Dwelly-d and Am Faclair Beag, online dictionaries by Michael Bauer and Will Robertson

Faclair na Gàidhlig

A partnership of the universities of Aberdeen, Edinburgh, Glasgow, Strathclyde and Sabhal Mòr Ostaig UHI is working to develop an authoritative, historical Gaelic dictionary comparable to the resources available for Scots and English through the Dictionary of the Older Scottish Tongue, the Scottish National Dictionary and the Oxford English Dictionary.

The dictionary will document fully the history of the Scottish Gaelic language and culture from the earliest manuscript material onwards, placing Scottish Gaelic in context with Irish and Lowland Scots, and it will show the relationship between Scottish Gaelic and Irish.

The project draws on the Corpas na Gàidhlig, part of the Digital Archive of Scottish Gaelic based at the University of Glasgow.

== Specialist dictionaries ==
Except for place-name publications, specialist dictionaries remain rare and focus almost exclusively on the natural world or government terminology. The most notable exception is An Stòr-dàta Briathrachais, a dictionary of general technical terminology published by the Gaelic college Sabhal Mòr Ostaig.

Timeline

- 1883 The Gaelic Names of Plants John Cameron - (digitised version at National Library of Scotland)
- 1890 The Gaelic Names of Diseases and Diseased States by Cameron Gillies
- 1905 Gaelic Names of Beasts, Birds, Fishes, Insects, Reptiles etc. by Alexander Forbes - (digitised version at National Library of Scotland)
- 1989 Gaelic Names for Flowers and Plants Douglas Clyne
- 1993 An Stòr-dàta Briathrachais
- 1999 Ainmean Gàidhlig Lusan - Gaelic Names of Plants Joan Clark and Ian MacDonald
- 2001 Faclair na Pàrlamaid, a dictionary of governmental terminology
- 2011 Dictionary for Local Government - Scottish Gaelic and English, an online dictionary by Comhairle nan Eilean Siar

== See also ==
- Irish lexicography
- Geiriadur Prifysgol Cymru
