= Isabella Leitch =

Nutritional physiologist (1890–1980)

Isabella Leitch OBE
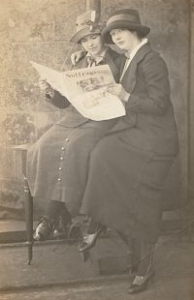
- Isabella on the right holding a 1913 copy of "The Suffragette"
- Born: 13 February 1890; Grantown-on-Spey
- Died: 21 July 1980 (aged 90); Warwick, Queensland
- Occupation: researcher
- Known for: leading the Imperial Bureau of Animal Nutrition

Isabella Leitch OBE (13 February 1890 – 21 July 1980) was a suffragette and a British nutritional physiologist. She led the Imperial Bureau of Animal Nutrition. She published work on human pregnancy and a wide variety of subjects. Her work on systematic reviews has been particularly noted.

== Life ==
Leitch was born in Grantown-on-Spey in 1890 and she later felt that might have been poorly fed. Her father, John Leitch, was religious and he had resigned his job as a postmaster when he was asked to work on a Sunday. He went on to work as a marine engineer. Her mother was another Isabella Leitch, she had been born a McLennan. Her parents had six children who were all daughters. She was educated at Peterhead Academy and then at Aberdeen University where she joined numerous courses. In 1911 she was awarded a master's degree in mathematics and natural philosophy and three years later she gained a degree in zoology, but she had also studied moral philosophy, Latin, political economy, the physiology of plant and animals and embryology.

She was an enthusiastic supporter of the Women's Social and Political Union and she would go to London to hear the leaders talk. She was used to confuse the police at meetings as she was similar in appearance to Christabel Pankhurst.

In 1914 with the suffragette's cause on hold, she went to Denmark to work with August Krogh at Copenhagen University. She was supported by the Carnegie Trust and there she researched the blood of invertebrates, the genetics of beans, the metabolism of peas. Her alma mater awarded her a DSc in 1919. She was highly qualified but could not find work. She had a gift for languages, being fluent in French, German, Danish, Swedish and Norwegian, and competent in Dutch and Italian, and she earned some money by doing translations.

She had been employed as a temporary librarian in 1923 at the Rowett Research Institute, but she was soon the director John Boyd Orr's assistant where she spread "the gospel according to Sir John". Her boss moved to lead the United Nations' Food and Agriculture Organization in 1945. Leitch said that when she first met him, he believed that the poor were poor because that was what they "deserved", and it was Leitch that changed his ideas and this in part led to his ideas on nutrition and his 1936 report, Food, Health and Income.

In 1949 her ex-boss, John Boyd Orr, was awarded the Nobel Peace Prize for his work on nutrition and she was awarded an OBE.

In 1959 she was invited to talk in Washington to the International Conference on Scientific Information. She created a paper titled "The place of analytical and critical reviews in any growing biological science and the service they may render to research", which looked at systematic reviews. This is identified as a key paper on the subject.

In 1964 she and Frank E. Hytten published The Physiology of Human Pregnancy. The book had emerged after Hytten had approached Leitch for assistance with publishing his work on human breast milk. She looked at his work and although she only saw three she recommended that ten be published. Hytten and Leitch would meet one evening each week over several years to collate their work together. One of the breakthroughs of their work was to show that the weight of mammal young is proportional to the weight of the mother and this is true for blue whales and the smallest of bats. Hytten credits Leitch with having the methodology, the contacts and the knowledge to quickly gather the required data.

Leitch was awarded an honorary doctor of laws degree by her alma mater, the University of Aberdeen in 1965.

== Bureau of Animal Nutrition ==
In 1929 the Imperial Bureau of Animal Nutrition was created. She held various positions at the Bureau including being its Director from 1945 to 1960. However both before and after being the director she was a major influence and it was said that she "was" the bureau. Her work at the bureau included writing advice such as "Sprouted fodder and germinated grain in stock feeding" published in 1939.

== Death and legacy ==
Leitch died in Warwick in Queensland in 1980. A review of her work concluded "In some ways, her approach echoed the remarkable flowering of science in the 8th and 9th centuries, when scientific scholars in the Islamic world brought together ideas and information from many cultures and translated documents and books from many languages to form a synthesis, thus giving a huge push to scientific understanding."
