= Welsh Place-Name Society =

Welsh toponymy advocacy society

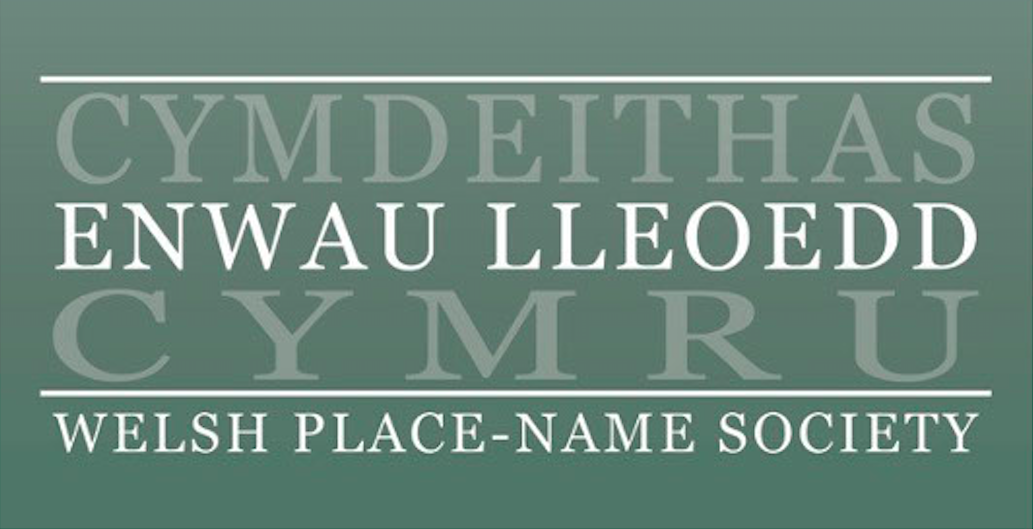
- WSPN Logo
- Abbreviation: WPNS
- Formation: 2011
- Purpose: Welsh toponymy
- Region served: Wales
- Website: Welsh Place-Name Society

The Welsh Place-Name Society was founded in 2011 with the aim of promoting an awareness and understanding of the study of place-names and their relationship to the languages, environment, history and culture of Wales.

== History ==
On 20 November 2010 Cymdeithas Edward Llwyd held a conference on the subject of Welsh toponymy at Plas Tan y Bwlch. In that meeting it was agreed to form the Welsh Place-Name Society. The Society was officially formed at a conference held on 1 October 2011 at the National Library of Wales in co-operation with the University of Wales Centre for Advanced Welsh and Celtic Studies.

== Activity ==
The Society holds an annual conference and publishes a bulletin twice a year. It also runs various projects and holds event in various part of Wales.
