= Estelle Maskame =

Scottish writer of young adult fiction (born 1997)

- Born: June 1997 (age 29); Aberdeen, United Kingdom
- Writing career
- Genre: Young adult fiction
- Website: estellemaskame.com

Estelle Maskame (born June 1997) is a Scottish writer of young adult fiction and new adult fiction.

== Early life ==
Maskame grew up in Peterhead, Scotland and attended Peterhead Academy.

She was writing full-length novels by the age of 11, and when she was 13 started posting her work online. She published Did I Mention I Love You? (DIMILY) on Wattpad and promoted it on Twitter; it had over 4 million hits.

== Writing career ==
Maskame's first novel, Did I Mention I Love You? (DIMILY), was published by Black & White Publishing in 2015 when she was aged 17. It was followed by Did I Mention I Need You? (2015), Did I Mention I Miss You? (2016), and Just Don't Mention It (2018), then Did I Mention it's 10 Years Later? (2019) on the tenth anniversary of the first (online) publication. She wrote two stand-alone novels, Dare to Fall (2017) and The Wrong Side of Kai (2019), before her Mila Trilogy of Becoming Mila, Trusting Blake, and The Making of Mila and Blake.

The DIMILY series has sold over 1.5 million copies and rights to its translations have been sold to 19 territories.

Maskame's first new adult novel, Somewhere in the Sunset, was published in April 2024, and Forever & Always You has been announced for publication in September 2025.

== Awards ==
Maskame won the 2016 Arts award of the Young Scot Awards and was shortlisted for the Romantic Young Adult Novel of the Year Award.

The Young Women's Movement named her as one of its "30 under 30" in 2016: this annual list comprises "30 women & non-binary people in Scotland, making changes in their community or wider society".

== Publications ==
=== Standalone novels ===
- Dare to Fall. Black & White Publishing. 2017. ISBN 9781785301087.
- The Wrong Side of Kai. Black & White Publishing. 2019. ISBN 9781785302480.
- Somewhere in the Sun. Black & White Publishing. 2024. ISBN 978-1785304934.
- Forever & Always You. Black & White Publishing. 4 September 2025. ISBN 978-1785308109.

=== DIMILY series ===
1. Did I Mention I Love You?. Black & White Publishing. 2015.
2. Did I Mention I Need You?. Black & White Publishing. 2015.
3. Did I Mention I Miss You?. Black & White Publishing. 2016.
4. Just Don't Mention It. Ink Road. 2018.
5. Did I Mention it's 10 Years Later?. Black & White Publishing. 2019.

=== The Mila trilogy ===
1. Becoming Mila. Black & White Publishing. 2021. ISBN 9781785303326.
2. Trusting Blake. Ink Road. 2021. ISBN 9781785303630.
3. The Making of Mila and Blake. Ink Road. 2022. ISBN 9781785303777.
