= Centre for Advanced Welsh and Celtic Studies =

Welsh research institute

University of Wales Centre for Advanced Welsh and Celtic Studies
- Canolfan Uwchefrydiau Cymreig a Cheltaidd Prifysgol Cymru (Welsh)

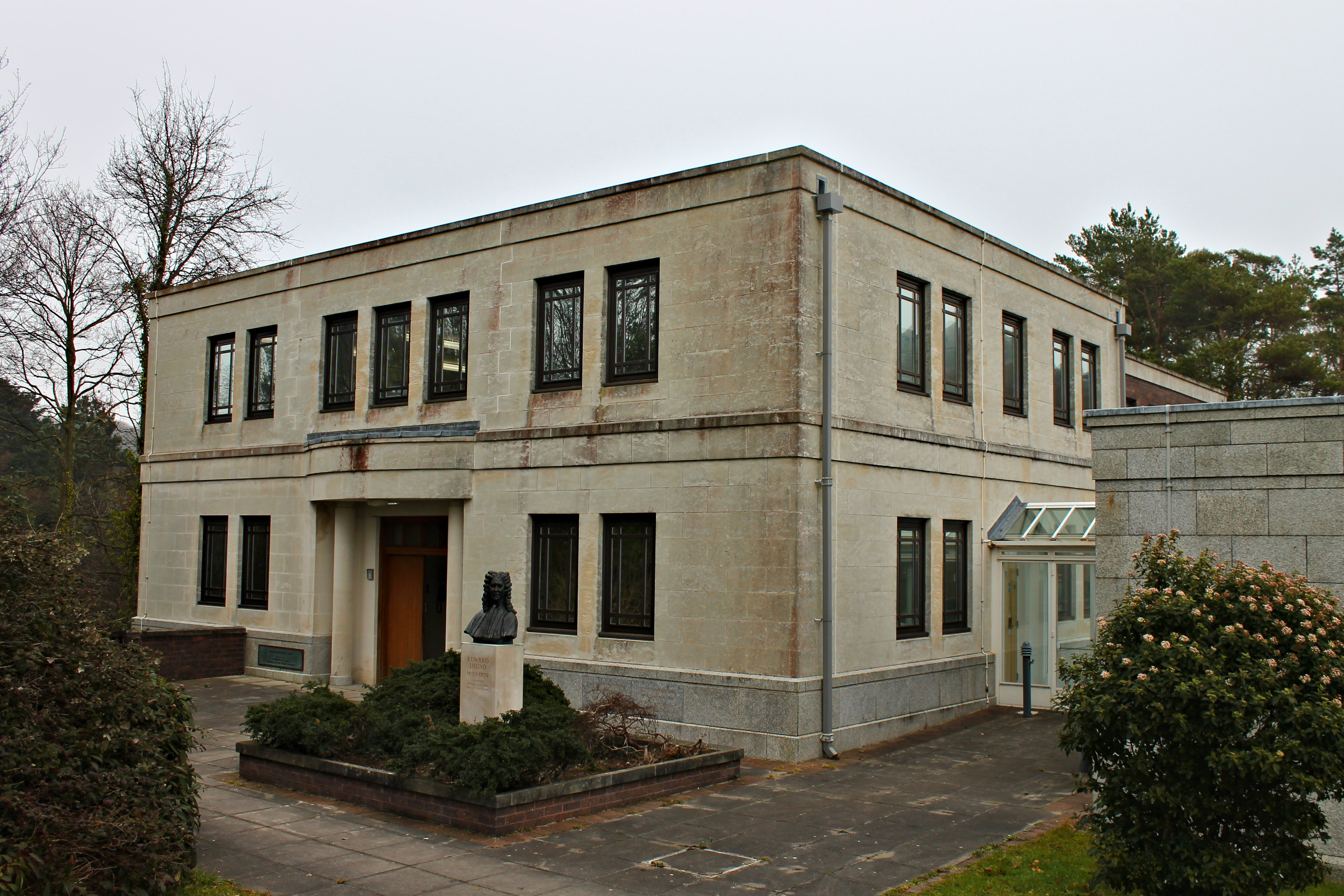
- Type: Research institute
- Headquarters: Aberystwyth, Ceredigion, Wales
- Coordinates: 52.41517°N 4.06885°W
- Director: Elin Haf Gruffydd Jones
- Parent organization: University of Wales Trinity Saint David (formerly University of Wales)
- Website: Wales.ac.uk

The Centre for Advanced Welsh and Celtic Studies (CAWCS; Welsh: Canolfan Uwchefrydiau Cymreig a Cheltaidd) is a research institute located in Aberystwyth, Wales. The centre was established by the University of Wales in 1985, and works under the University of Wales Trinity Saint David.

The centre holds responsibility on managing the University of Wales Dictionary, one of the main dictionaries of the Welsh language. It also manages the Dictionary of Welsh Biography with the National Library of Wales, as well as various projects, such as those relating to the poets or manuscripts of Wales, and collaborating with institutions in other Celtic nations.

== History and background ==
The centre was established in 1985 by the University of Wales, and focuses on the studies of languages, literatures, the culture and history of Wales, and of the other Celtic nations. It has been based in Aberystwyth, next to the National Library of Wales since 1993. The centre's first director was R. Geraint Gruffydd, and it has 30 staff as of 2023.

The University of Wales and the Higher Education Funding Council for Wales are the main sources of funding for the centre. Although additional project funding has been provided by UK Research Councils and charities, the British Academy, as well as public and private donors. The centre received funding from the Arts and Humanities Research Council by 2023.

In 2007, the centre was awarded a £879,383 grant, from the Arts and Humanities Research Council to look into the work of 15th century poet Guto'r Glyn. The grant was believed to be the largest of its kind awarded to a university in Wales, at the time.

Between the academic years of 2008/2009 to 2009/2010, the centre's funding was increased by 47.5%, although other institutions in Wales received a cut in funding.

In June 2011, the centre and the Welsh School of Architectural Glass at Swansea Metropolitan University launched on online catalogue of 5,000 images of stained glass windows in Wales. In the same year, during discussions over the state of the University of Wales (UoW) and its eventual merger into UoW Trinity St Davids, the centre's future, as one of four UoW institutions, was questioned prior to the merger.

In October 2011, the centre, with Cymdeithas Edward Llwyd, assisted in the establishment of the Welsh Place-Name Society.

In 2012, the centre, with Aberystwyth University and the Met Office's International Atmospheric Circulation Reconstructions over the Earth (ACRE), collected experiences of unusual weather events in Wales as part of "Snows of Yesteryear".

In March 2013, the centre was awarded a grant of £750,000 to edit medieval manuscripts, and to resources online that can be accessed by the public. Later in the same month, the centre was awarded £689,167 to investigate the "archaeological background of the emergence of the Celtic languages in western Europe", in collaboration with Bangor University, Oxford University, King's College London, and the National Library of Wales.

In October 2013, the centre, alongside the universities of Aberdeen, Bangor, Cambridge, Edinburgh, Glasgow, Oxford, Swansea, Queen's University Belfast, Ulster, the University of the Highlands and Islands, and the University of Wales, Trinity Saint David, and organised by the University of Glasgow, established the Doctoral Training Centre in the Celtic Languages, with Arts and Humanities Research Council funding. The training centre provided doctoral studentships and support to the training of students in the Celtic languages, over the course of five years.

In 2020, the centre announced it would be integrated with the Institute of Education and Humanities at the University of Wales Trinity Saint David.

In June 2022, the centre and the National Library published A Repertory of Welsh Manuscripts and Scribes, c.800–c.1800, described as the "most thorough and scholarly study of Welsh manuscripts". The publication was launched by First Minister of Wales, Mark Drakeford.

In December 2022, the centre announced a partnership with Brest-based Centre de Recherche Bretonne et Celtique on researching the historical links between Wales and Brittany.

== Projects ==
One of the main projects of the centre is maintaining the University of Wales Dictionary, which is acknowledged as the authority on Welsh spelling, meaning and derivation, comparable to the Oxford English Dictionary. The centre adds and updates the dictionary's entries. The centre also shares responsibility for the Dictionary of Welsh Biography with the National Library of Wales. The centre also conducts work on the Poets of the Princes and Poets of the Nobility.

Some notable past projects of the centre include the following:

- 2007 Guto'r Glyn
- 2011 Stained glass online catalogue
- 2012 "Snows of Yesteryear"
- 2013 Celtic language emergence in western Europe
- 2013 Doctoral Training Centre in the Celtic Languages
- 2022 A Repertory of Welsh Manuscripts and Scribes, c.800–c.1800
- 2022 Historic links with Brittany
