= Peter Buchan (poet) =

Scottish poet and writer (1917–1991)

- Born: 1917
- Died: 12 December 1991 (aged 73–74)
- Occupation: Poet

Peter Buchan (1917 – 12 December 1991) was a Scottish poet and writer from Peterhead, Aberdeenshire. He was most active from the mid-1940s until his death.

== Early life ==
Buchan was born in 1917 in Jamaica Street, Peterhead, the son of a local fisherman. His mother was from Denny, Stirlingshire. He was educated at Peterhead Academy. After finishing school, aged 16, he served aboard the family's fishing boat, the Sparkling Star.

== Career ==
After World War II, Buchan began writing, in the Doric dialect, poems and short stories, publishing three collections.

He later worked for Peterhead Harbour Board.

== Personal life ==
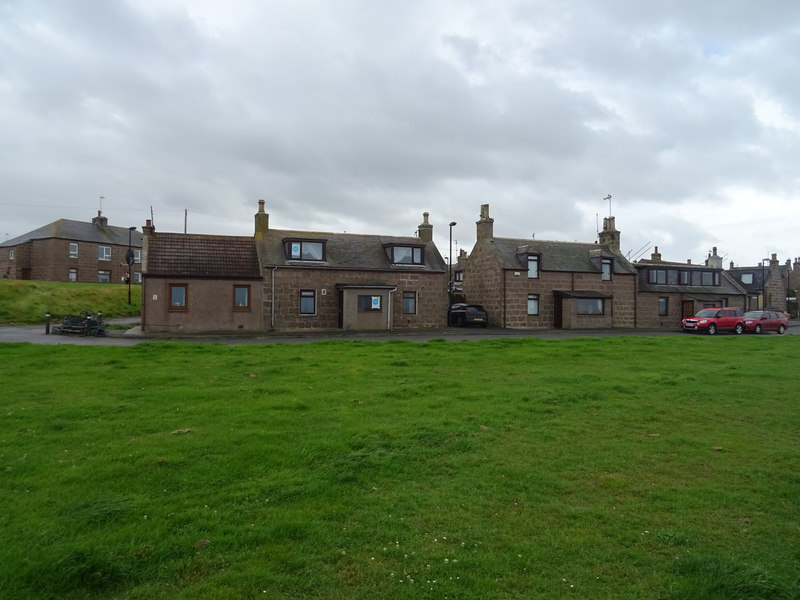
Buchan lived at Mount Pleasant, 5 Harbour Street, Buchanhaven (last house on the right in this 2020 image)

In 1940, Buchan married Agnes Crowe. They lived at Mount Pleasant on Harbour Street in Buchanhaven.

A portrait of Buchan was commissioned in 1991 by North East Scotland Museum Service (later Aberdeen Heritage). Painted by Michael Knowles, it is in the possession of Peterhead's Arbuthnot Museum.

He was vice-president of the Buchan Heritage Society from 1988 to 1990. He was also a lifelong member of Peterhead Congregational Church.

== Death ==
Buchan died in 1991, aged 73 or 74. He was buried in his hometown of Peterhead.

== Bibliography ==
- Mount Pleasant (1961)
- Buchan Claik: The Saut an the Glaur O't (with David Toulmin)
- Fit Like, Skipper?
- Fisher Blue
- Collected Poems and Short Stories (1992)
