= Edward Lhuyd =

British scientist, geographer, historian and antiquary (1660–1709)

Edward Lhuyd FRS
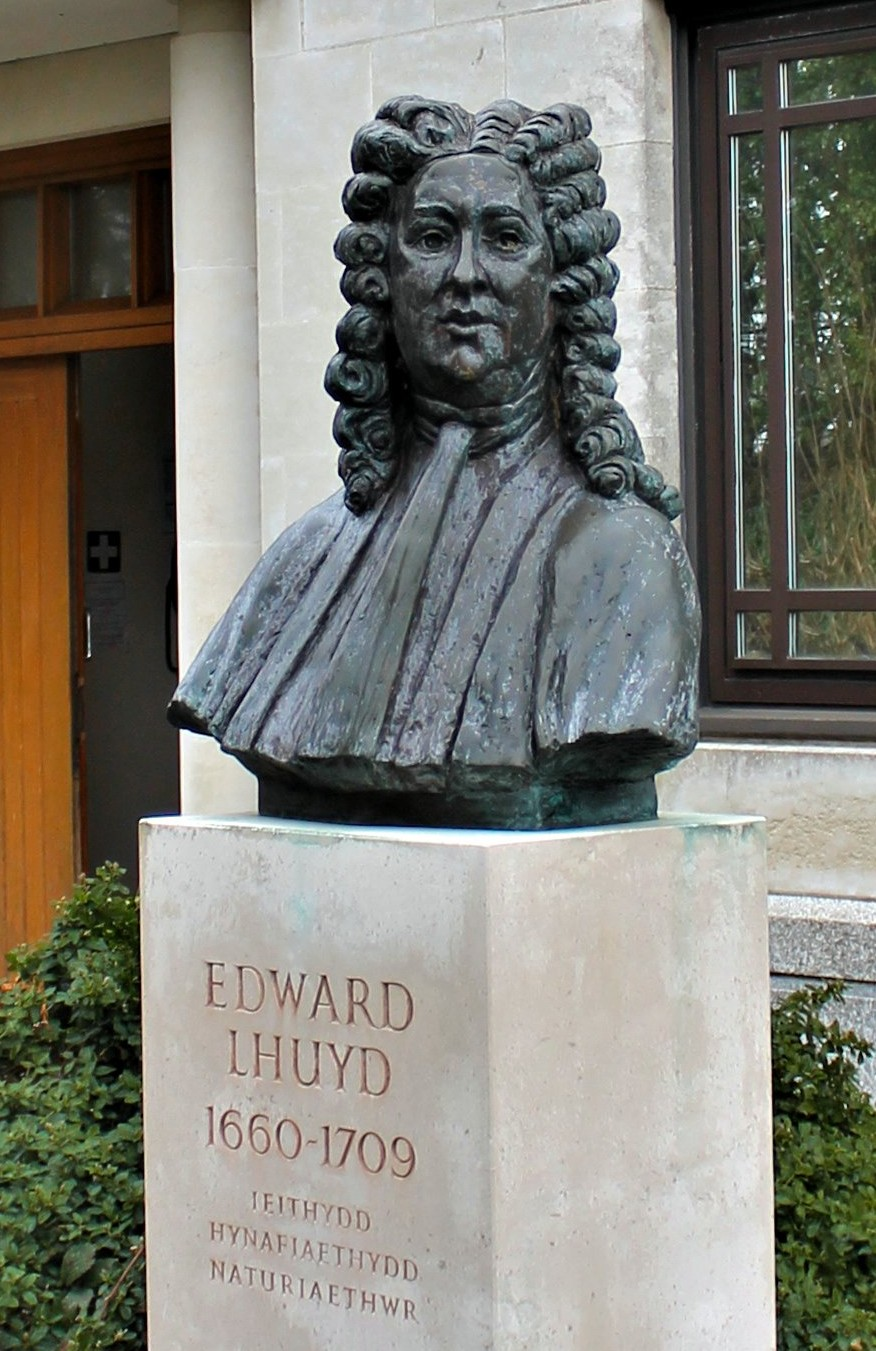
- Lhuyd's bust outside the University of Wales Centre for Advanced Welsh and Celtic Studies in Aberystwyth
- Born: 1660; Loppington, Kingdom of England
- Died: 30 June 1709 (aged 48–49); Oxford, Kingdom of England
- Education: University of Oxford

Edward Lhuyd (/lɔɪd/ LOYD; Welsh: [ˈɬʊid]; 1660 – 30 June 1709), also known as Edward Lhwyd and by other spellings, was a British scientist, geographer, historian and antiquary. He was the second Keeper of the University of Oxford's Ashmolean Museum, and published the first catalogue of fossils, the Lithophylacii Britannici Ichnographia.

== Name ==
Lhuyd is an archaic spelling of the same Welsh surname now usually rendered as Lloyd or Llwyd, from llwyd ('grey'). It also appears frequently as Lhwyd; less often as Lhwydd, Llhwyd, Llwid and Floyd; and latinized as (Eduardus or Edvardus) Luidius, frequently abbreviated Luid., and as Lhuydus and Lloydia in some scientific names. The English and Latin forms are also sometimes combined as Edward Luidius.

== Life ==
Lhuyd was born in 1660, in Loppington, Shropshire, England, the illegitimate son of Edward Llwyd or Lloyd of Llanforda, Oswestry, and Bridget Pryse of Llansantffraid, near Talybont, Cardiganshire, in 1660. His family belonged to the gentry of southwest Wales. Though well established, the family was not wealthy. His father experimented with agriculture and industry in a manner that impinged on the new science of the day. The son attended and later taught at Oswestry Grammar School, and in 1682 went up to Jesus College, Oxford, but dropped out before graduation. In 1684, he was appointed to assist Robert Plot, Keeper of the Ashmolean Museum (which at that time was in Broad Street), and became the second Keeper himself in 1690, holding the post until his death in 1709.

While working at the Ashmolean Museum, Lhuyd travelled extensively. A visit to Snowdonia in 1688 allowed him to compile for John Ray's Synopsis Methodica Stirpium Britannicarum a list of flora local to that region. After 1697, Lhuyd visited every county in Wales, then travelled to Scotland, Ireland, Cornwall, Brittany and the Isle of Man. In 1699, it became possible through funding from his friend Isaac Newton for him to publish the first catalogue ever of fossils, his Lithophylacii Britannici Ichnographia. These had been collected in England, mostly in Oxford, and are now held in the Ashmolean.

Lhuyd received a MA honoris causa from the University of Oxford in 1701 and a fellowship of the Royal Society in 1708.

In 1696, Lluyd transcribed much of the Latin inscription on the 9th-century Pillar of Eliseg near Valle Crucis Abbey, Denbighshire. The inscription subsequently became almost illegible due to weathering, but Lhuyd's transcript seems to have been remarkably accurate.

Lhuyd was also responsible for the first scientific description and naming of what we would now recognize as a dinosaur: the sauropod tooth Rutellum impicatum.

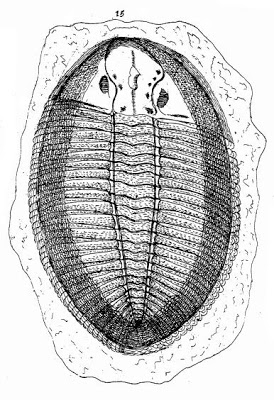
Lhuyd's "flat fish", drawn by him in 1698 and now identified as the Ordovician trilobite O. debuchii

The first written record of a trilobite was by Lhuyd in a letter to Martin Lister in 1688 and published (1689) in his Lithophylacii Britannici Ichnographia. It is a fleeting mention and he simply identifies his find as a "skeleton of some flat fish". The trilobite is nowadays identified as Ogygiocarella debuchii Brongniart, 1822.

== Pioneering linguist ==
In the late 17th century, Lhuyd was contacted by a group of scholars led by John Keigwin of Mousehole, who sought to preserve and further the Cornish language. He accepted their invitation to travel there and study the language. Early Modern Cornish was the subject of a paper published by Lhuyd in 1702; it differs from the medieval language in having a considerably simpler structure and grammar.

In 1707, having been assisted in his research by a fellow scholar, Moses Williams, Lhuyd published the first volume of Archæologia Britannica. This has an important linguistic description of Cornish, which is noted all the more for the understanding of historical linguistics it shows. Some of the ideas commonly attributed to linguists of the 19th century have their roots in this work by Lhuyd, who was "considerably more sophisticated in his methods and perceptions than [William] Jones".

Lhuyd noted a similarity between two language families: Brythonic or P–Celtic (Breton, Cornish and Welsh) and Goidelic or Q–Celtic (Irish, Manx and Scottish Gaelic). He argued that both families were derived from the Continental Celtic languages; the Brythonic languages originated in the Gaulish language once spoken and written by the Gauls of Pre-Roman France and the Goidelic languages are derived from the Celtiberian language once spoken in the Pre-Roman Iberian Peninsula, which includes modern Spain and Portugal. He concluded that as these languages were of Celtic origin, those who spoke them were Celts. From the 18th century, peoples of Brittany, Cornwall, Ireland, the Isle of Man, Scotland and Wales were known increasingly as Celts. They are seen to this day as modern Celtic nations.

== Death and legacy ==
On his travels, Lhuyd developed asthma, which eventually led to his death from pleurisy in Oxford in 1709. He died in his room in the Ashmolean Museum, aged just 49, and was buried in the Welsh aisle of the church of St Michael at the Northgate.

The Cretaceous bryozoan species Charixa lhuydi (originally described as Membranipora lhuydi) is named in his honour. The Snowdon lily (Gagea serotina) was for a time called Lloydia serotina after Lhuyd.

Cymdeithas Edward Llwyd, the National Naturalists' Society of Wales, is named after him. On 9 June 2001 a bronze bust of him was unveiled by Dafydd Wigley, a former Plaid Cymru leader, outside the University of Wales Centre for Advanced Welsh and Celtic Studies in Aberystwyth, next to the National Library of Wales. The sculptor was John Meirion Morris; the inscription on the plinth, carved by Ieuan Rees, reads "EDWARD LHUYD 1660–1709 IEITHYDD HYNAFIAETHYDD NATURIAETHWR" ("linguist, antiquary, naturalist").
