= Peterhead Academy =

Location
- Prince Street; Peterhead; Aberdeenshire, AB42 1SY; Scotland; 57.508539°N 1.788831°W

Information
- Type: State comprehensive
- Motto: Domus Super Petram Aedificata (A House Built On A Rock)
- Local authority: Aberdeenshire Council
- Head teacher: Gerry McCluskey
- Staff: 91 FTE (at September 2015)
- Years: S1-S6
- Gender: Co-educational
- Age: 11 to 18
- Enrolment: 1213 (2021)
- Houses: 6
- Colours: Black, White and Maroon
- Website: www.peterheadacademy.aberdeenshire.sch.uk

Peterhead Academy is a six-year Comprehensive Community School in Peterhead, Aberdeenshire, Scotland. It is operated by Aberdeenshire Council.

== History ==
The original building of Peterhead Academy was built in 1846 and was originally a boys only school The South-east (Modern Languages) wing was built in 1961 with further building in the 1970s taking the school to its current form. The extension to the school is formed of several hexagonal sections and contains the school's swimming pool. It was opened by Fraser Noble in 1978. The newer part of the Academy that is connected to the Peterhead Leisure Centre, is built on the area that used to be Peterhead Railway Station.

Peterhead Academy houses around 1,300 pupils. The Academy is split up into six houses: Arbuthnot, Buchan, Craigewan, Grange, Marischal and Slains. Each house is a different colour with Arbuthnot green, Buchan red, Craigewan yellow, Grange purple, Marischal blue and Slains Turquoise. At one point there used to be eight houses: the six previously mentioned, plus Ugie and Ravenscraig. The Academy's motto is "Domus Super Petram Aedificata" (A House Built on a Rock). The Academy is Scotland's largest school with around 23,000 square metres (250,000 sq ft) in terms of gross internal floor area.

== Community School Network ==
In addition to Peterhead Academy, the Peterhead Community School Network consists of Anna Ritchie School, Boddam School, Buchanhaven Primary School, Burnhaven School, Clerkhill School, Dales Park School, Longhaven School, Meethill School, Peterhead Central School, Port Erroll School and St Fergus School.

== Former pupils ==
- Peter Buchan (1917–1991), poet
- George Mackenzie Dunnet (1928–1995), ornithologist and ecologist
- Alexander Charles Farquharson (1864–1961), Member of Parliament (1918–1922), doctor, barrister and soldier
- Flora Garry (1900–2000), poet
- Isabella Leitch (1890-1980), nutritionist.
- Stuart MacLeod (b. 1980), magician
- Connor McLennan (b. 1999), professional footballer
- Colin Mark (b. 1936), lexicographer, author on the linguistics of Scottish Gaelic.
- Frederick Martin (1882–1950), Member of Parliament (1922–1924)
- Estelle Maskame (b. 1997), author
