= Geiriadur Prifysgol Cymru =

Historical dictionary of the Welsh language

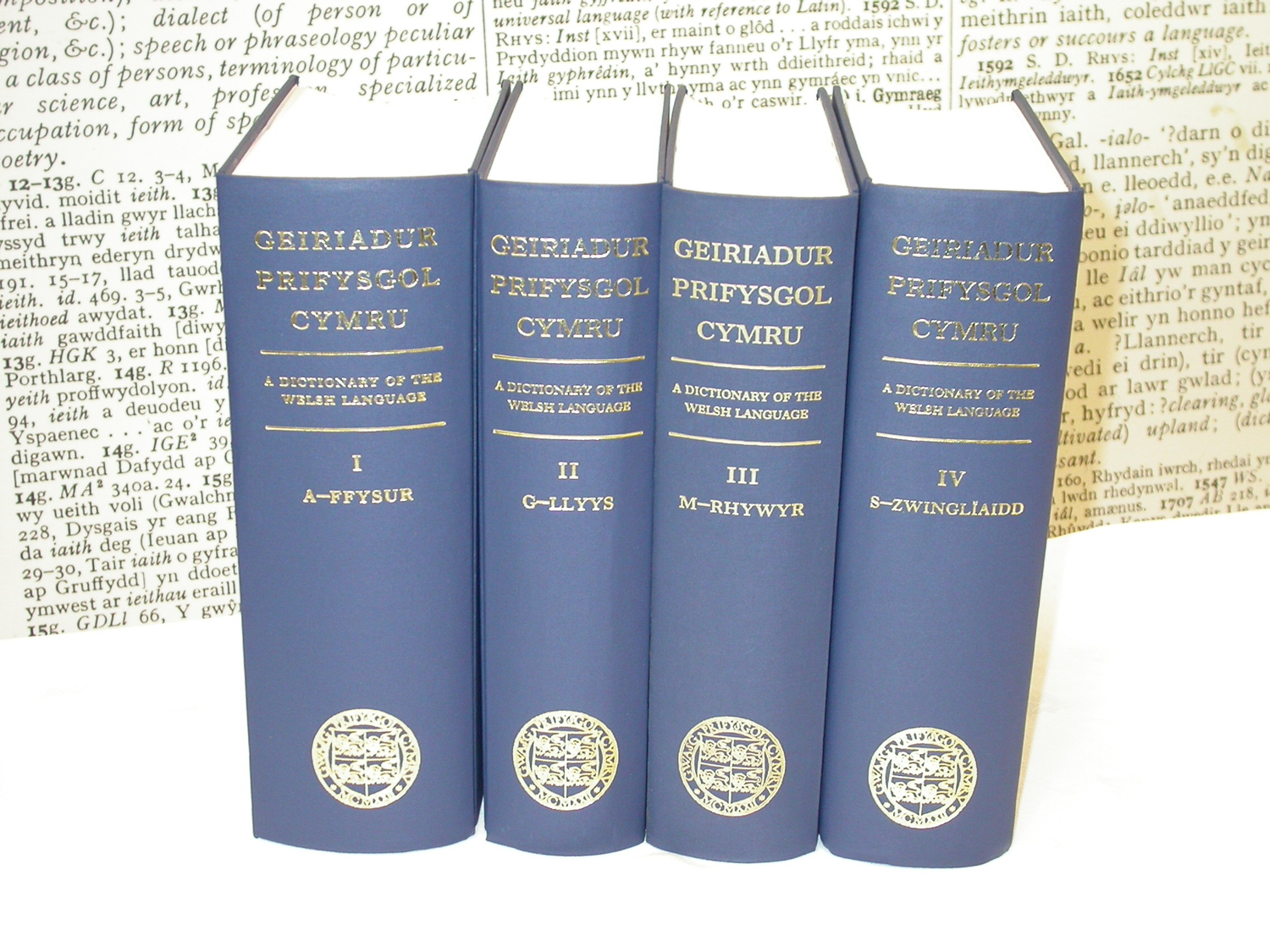
The four volumes of the first edition of Geiriadur Prifysgol Cymru (1950–2002)

Geiriadur Prifysgol Cymru (The University of Wales Dictionary) is the only standard historical dictionary of the Welsh language, aspiring to be "comparable in method and scope to the Oxford English Dictionary". Vocabulary is defined in Welsh, and English equivalents are given. Detailed attention is given to variant forms, collocations, and etymology.

The first edition was published in four volumes between 1967 and 2002, containing 7.3 million words of text in 3,949 pages, documenting 106,000 headwords. There are almost 350,000 dated citations dating from the year 631 up to 2000, with 323,000 Welsh definitions and 290,000 English equivalents, of which 85,000 have included etymologies.

== History ==
In 1921, a small team at the National Library of Wales, Aberystwyth, organised by the Rev. J. Bodvan Anwyl, arranged for volunteer readers to record words. The task of editing the dictionary was undertaken by R. J. Thomas in the 1948/49 academic year.

The first edition of Volume I appeared in 1967, followed by Volume II in 1987, Volume III in 1998, and Volume IV, edited by Gareth A. Bevan and P. J. Donovan, in December 2002. Work then immediately began on a second edition.

Following the retirement of the previous editors Gareth A. Bevan and Patrick J. Donovan, Andrew Hawke was appointed as managing editor in January 2008.

The second edition is based not only on the Dictionary's own collection of citation slips, but also on a wide range of electronic resources such as the Welsh Prose 1300–1425 website (Cardiff University), JISC Historic Books including EEBO and EECO (The British Library), Welsh Newspapers Online and Welsh Journals Online (National Library of Wales), and the National Terminology Portal (Bangor University).

In 2011, collaborative work began to convert the Dictionary data so that it could be used in the XML-based iLEX dictionary writing system, as well as to produce an online dictionary. After three years of work, on 26 June 2014, GPC Online was launched by then First Minister of Wales, Carwyn Jones, AM, in the Welsh Assembly. GPC Online attracted 10,251 visitors to its search page on the first day after launch.

On 12 May 2015, it was announced that the Welsh Government had awarded the Centre for Advanced Welsh & Celtic Studies with a grant of £40,500 from the Welsh-language Technology and Digital Media Fund to aid development of a version of the Dictionary for mobile devices. A year later, on 24 February 2016, free mobile and tablet applications for the Dictionary were announced and launched. To accompany the launch, more than 400 new words were added to the dictionary. Within a week of the launch, over a thousand people had downloaded the application.

== See also ==
- Irish lexicography
- Scottish Gaelic dictionaries
