= Cymdeithas Edward Llwyd =

Welsh natural history organisation

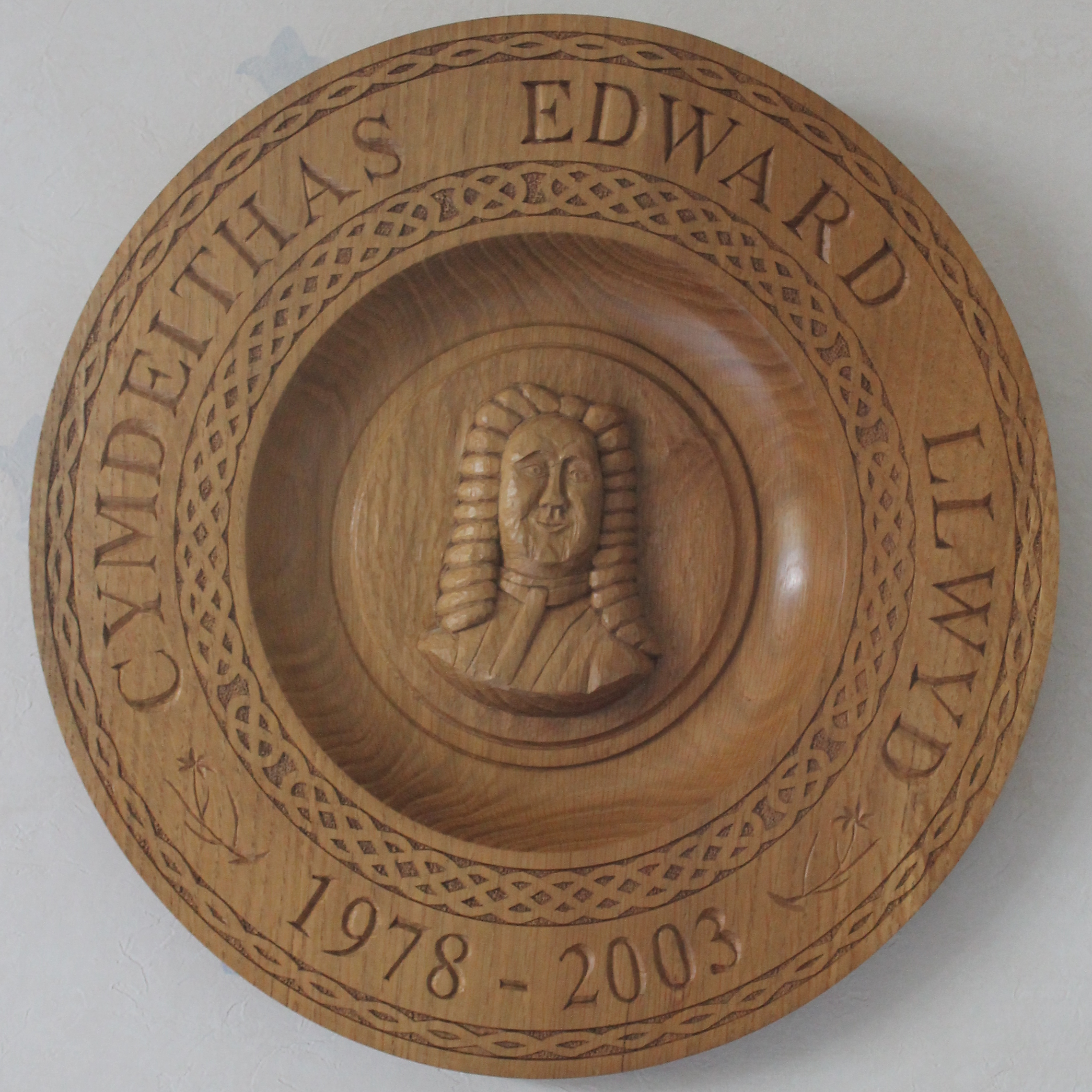
Plaque at Plas Tan y Bwlch, Gwynedd, commemorating the 25th anniversary of Cymdeithas Edward Llwyd

Cymdeithas Edward Llwyd (Welsh for 'Edward Llwyd Society') is a Welsh natural history organisation whose name commemorates the great Welsh natural historian, geographer and linguist Edward Llwyd (1660–1709).

Cymdeithas Edward Llwyd organises regular country walks throughout Wales in sites of interest to the Welsh environment, including SSSIs and post-industrial landscapes. These are Welsh-language walking groups, although learners are just as welcome.

They also organise a variety of nature and environmental activities, including lectures, publications and conservation work. They have worked on collecting and documenting the names of natural species.

In 2010, the society held a conference on Welsh toponymy, at which it was agreed to form the Welsh Place-Name Society.
