= Caroline Grace-Cassidy =

Irish actress, novelist and screenwriter

- Born: Dublin, Ireland
- Occupations: Actress; novelist; screenwriter
- Children: 2
- Website: carolinegracecassidy.com

Caroline Grace-Cassidy (née Caroline Grace) is an Irish film and television actress, screenwriter, and author of seven novels. She is also known as a TV panelist.

== Career ==
Grace's first major acting role was as Miss Mull in Custer's Last Stand Up, a BAFTA-winning children's television series, and she later acted in a range of Irish domestic and international releases, including work with Jim Sheridan. She is best known for her role in David Gordon Green's comedy fantasy film Your Highness. She became a full-time novelist and screenwriter in 2011.

Her debut novel, When Love Takes Over, was released by Poolbeg Press on 7 February 2012. The Irish Times newspaper named Grace-Cassidy on their list of People to Watch in 2012. Since then she has published The Other Side Of Wonderful (2013), I Always Knew (2014), Already Taken (2015), The Week I Ruined My Life (2016), The Importance Of Being Me (2017), and Bride Squad Runaway (2019) with U.K. publishers Black & White Publishing, with The Unforeseen Love Story Of Lexie Byrne due in 2021.

Grace-Cassidy has been a regular panelist with Midday, later renamed The Elaine Show, on TV3, now Virgin Media One, since 2012.

She is a creative director at Document Films and a co-founder of the TV and film house Park Pictures. She has written eight short films: Princess Rehab (2013), Galway Fleadh-winning I AM JESUS (2014), Torn (2014), Even Droids Have Friends (2015), Cineuropa Award-winning Love At First Light (2015), Blackbird (2016), Reach (2017), and Run (2019). She is the co-writer of The Quiet Woman, which is currently in development with Park Films, supported by Screen Ireland.

As of 2016, Grace-Cassidy's seventh novel, Bride Squad Runaway, was being adapted as a television drama, and a film adaptation of her fifth novel, The Week I Ruined My Life, was announced in 2017.

== Personal life ==
Grace-Cassidy is married to Kevin, with two daughters as of 2016.
