= Robert Archibald Armstrong =

Robert Archibald Armstrong, LL.D. (bapt. 16 February 1788– 25 May 1867), was a Gaelic lexicographer. He was the eldest son of Robert Armstrong, of Kenmore, Perthshire, by his wife, Mary McKercher. He was born at Kenmore in 1788, and educated partly by his father, and afterwards at Edinburgh and at St. Andrews University, here he graduated. Coming to London from St. Andrews with high commendations for his Greek and Latin acquirements, he engaged in tuition, and kept several high-class schools in succession in different parts of the metropolis. He devoted his leisure to the cultivation of literature and science. Of his humorous articles "The Three Florists," in Eraser for January 1838, and "The Dream of Tom Finiarty, the Cab-driver," in the Athenæum, are notable examples. His scientific papers appeared chiefly in the Arcana of Science and Art (1837 et seq.), and relate to meteorological matters. But his great work was A Gaelic Dictionary, in two parts — I. Gaelic and English, II. English and Gaelic — in which the words, in their different acceptations, are illustrated by quotations from the best Gaelic writers, London, 1825, 4to, This was the first Gaelic dictionary published, as there previously existed only vocabularies of the language like those of William Shaw (An Analysis of the Galic Language 1778 and Galick and English Dictionary 1780) and others.

This work, running to nearly 1100 pages, was the first Gaelic dictionary to attempt to provide etymological information. It also improved on previous works by incorporating a grammar of Gaelic and by indicating the word-class of entries. In the Dictionary of National Biography published 1885, Thompson Cooper calls it "a most meritorious work," writing "the affinities of the Celtic words being traced in most of the languages of ancient and modern times. To it is prefixed a Gaelic grammar, and there is a short historical appendix of ancient names, deduced from the authority of Ossian and other poets." However, in the modern edition of the Dictionary of National Biography published in 2004, W. Steven Dodd writes "Armstrong can be seen in hindsight as overcredulous in accepting the authenticity of ‘Ossian’—devoting an appendix to characters from his poems—and overenthusiastic in offering not just (frequently accurate) Indo-European cognates for the words whose etymologies he provides, but also parallels from other language families which later developments in linguistic sciences have discredited. He makes it plain in his preface that he believes all languages have a single origin, which is highly debatable, and that Scottish Gaelic is the ancestor of Irish, Manx, and even Welsh, which is definitely wrong."

Armstrong's dictionary was partially eclipsed, three years after its appearance, by the publication of the still more comprehensive Dictionarium Scoto-Celticum, compiled under the direction of the Highland Society of Scotland (2 vols. 4to, 1828). Armstrong sank his small fortune in the publication of his three-guinea quarto, and in a pecuniary sense he was a considerable loser by its publication. For about twenty-two years he maintained his family by establishing the South Lambeth Grammar School, and on his retirement from the head-mastership to Richmond in 1852 a representation of his necessitous condition was sent to Lord Palmerston, who obtained for him a civil list pension of £60. This opportune assistance and a grant from the Royal Literary Fund enabled him to recommence his scholastic business, which, though now of small proportions on account of his great age, he continued till he was struck down by paralysis about a week before he died.

In 1826 he had been appointed Gaelic lexicographer in ordinary to the king, but the appointment was honorary and no salary was attached to it. He died in Choumert Road, Peckham Rye, Surrey, 25 May 1867. Lord Derby advised her majesty to cheer the last days of the veteran scholar by a grant of £100 from the Royal Bounty Fund; and in 1869 Queen Victoria, on the recommendation of Prime Minister Gladstone, granted an annual pension of £50 to his widow. Dr. Armstrong married, in 1842, Emma, daughter of Stephen Dungate, by whom he left three daughters.

== See also ==
- Scottish Gaelic dictionaries
