= Black & White Publishing =

Publishing house in Edinburgh, Scotland

- Founded: 1999
- Founder: Campbell Brown and Alison McBride
- Country of origin: United Kingdom
- Headquarters location: Edinburgh
- Distribution: Grantham Book Services
- Publication types: Books
- Imprints: Ink Road, Itchy Coo
- Official website: blackandwhitepublishing.com

Black & White Publishing is an independent publishing house based in the Leith area of Edinburgh, Scotland. Since 1999, the company has produced a range of titles, with more than 350 in print, including over 50 in the award-winning Itchy Coo imprint, and their new imprint for young adult fiction, Ink Road. Books published include biography, sport, humour, general non-fiction, fiction, young adult fiction and children's books.

== History ==
Set up in 2002 with initial funding from the Scottish Arts Council, the Itchy Coo imprint began as a partnership between the publisher and a group of three writers (Matthew Fitt, James Robertson and Susan Rennie). Itchy Coo publishes books in Scots for children and is the primary provider of educational material in the language, a Scottish Arts Council report stating that "There has never before been such a significant and concentrated input of Scots language materials into schools". Creative Scotland awarded funding for several titles. Until 2011 Itchy Coo ran an education and outreach programme, delivering 500 in-service training sessions to teachers and visiting 1000 schools. A Scottish Government ministerial working group report stated in 2010 that "The Itchy Coo project has been the main driver of change for Scots since 2002 and has brought about a huge shift in attitudes towards the language in education". Itchy Coo publish translations into Scots of such authors as Raymond Briggs, Roald Dahl, Julia Donaldson, Jean-Yves Ferri (Asterix), Jeff Kinney, A. A. Milne, J. K. Rowling, Alexander McCall Smith, Robert Louis Stevenson and David Walliams. Dahl's The Eejits and Geordie's Mingin Medicine attained number one bestseller in Scotland.

Black & White Publishing has sponsored the Scots Schuil o the Year category since the inception of the Scots Language Awards in 2019. They themselves won in the 2019 Scots Business o the Year category and Scots Bairn's Book o the Year was awarded to an Itchy Coo title in 2019 and 2020. One of the first Itchy Coo titles, Animal ABC, was awarded the Saltire Society/Times Education Scotland Prize in 2002, and Black & White received a commendation in the 2015 Saltire Society Publisher of the Year Award.

== Authors ==
Authors published by Black & White include:

- Donna Ashworth
- Caroline Grace Cassidy
- Andrew Cotter
- Margaret Thomson Davis
- Matthew Fitt
- Jessie Kesson
- Gary Maclean
- Estelle Maskame
- Val McDermid
- Anthony O'Neill
- James Robertson
- Elaine C. Smith
