= Edward Dwelly =

English lexicographer and genealogist

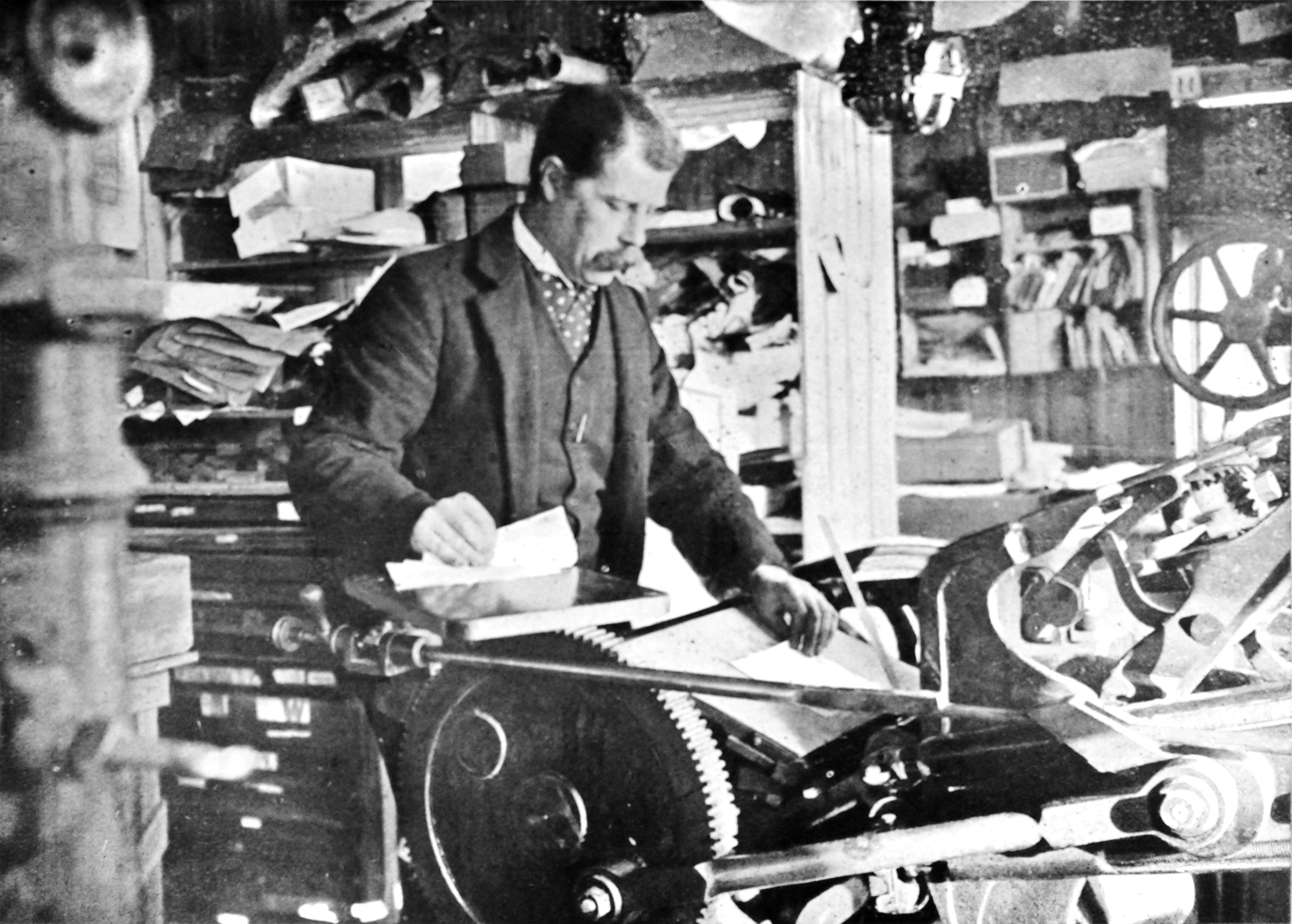
- Born: 1864; Twickenham, Middlesex, England
- Died: 1939 Fleet, Hampshire, England
- Citizenship: British
- Writing career
- Pen name: Eoghann MacDhòmhnaill
- Subject: Scottish Gaelic
- Notable work: Faclair Gàidhlig gu Beurla le Dealbhan/The Illustrated Gaelic–English Dictionary

Edward Dwelly (1864–1939) was an English lexicographer and genealogist. He created the authoritative dictionary of Scottish Gaelic, and his work has had an influence on Irish Gaelic lexicography. He also practised as a professional genealogist and published transcripts of many original documents relating to Somerset.

== Biography ==
Born in Twickenham, Middlesex, in England, he became interested in Scottish Gaelic after being stationed in Scotland with the army and working with the Ordnance Survey. He began collecting words at the age of seventeen and was also a keen bagpiper.

He released the dictionary in sections from 1901 onwards and the first full edition of his Illustrated Gaelic Dictionary in 1911 under the pen name of Eoghann MacDhòmhnaill (Ewen MacDonald) fearing that his work would not be well accepted under his own obviously English name.

He continued collating entries from older dictionaries and also recording thousands of new words, both from publications and from his travels in the Gaelic-speaking parts of Scotland. He illustrated, printed, bound and marketed his dictionary with help from his children and wife Mary McDougall (from Kilmadock) whom he had married in 1896, herself a native Gaelic speaker, teaching himself the skills required.

In 1912, Dwelly self-published his Compendium of Notes on the Dwelly Family, a 54-page genealogical work on the Dwelly family from a John Duelye in 1229, mainly covering Britain, but with an American section, and pedigrees and parish register extracts with supporting notes.

He returned to England in 1899 in order to care for his elderly widowed mother and remained there until his death in 1939. He began compiling and publishing the dictionary during this period, although at first he struggled to attract funding for its publication. He claimed in a preface that he gained a state pension from Edward VII for his work, although Berresford Ellis highlights the discrepancies in this claim, concluding, 'perhaps we shall never know the truth'. The fame of his dictionary grew far more after his death, although he was recognised during his lifetime, having been made an honorary life member of both the Gaelic Society of London and An Comunn Gàidhealach.

In 1991, the late Dr Douglas Clyne sourced several manuscripts in the National Library of Scotland which were published by him as Appendix to Dwelly's Gaelic-English Dictionary, over half of the entries being from "A-to-D" alone but containing additional information not published in Dwelly's lifetime.

His life has been little researched, the best study being the biographical introduction by Peter Berresford Ellis in Clyne's Appendix.

== Edward Dwelly's dictionary ==
Dwelly's illustrated Scottish Gaelic dictionary, consisting of well over one thousand pages, was truly a marvellous achievement in its day, particularly in view of the difficult circumstances which he faced in preparing it. Dwelly was nonetheless eager to express his gratitude to those who assisted him. He particularly expressed his thanks to the recently deceased King Edward VII for awarding him a Civil List Pension when only about one half of the dictionary had been published. He wished dearly to have been able to present a copy of his completed dictionary to the King and expressed sadness at the news of the King's death.

Dwelly also expressed his particular gratitude to his wife for revising proofs and assisting in correspondence as well as advising on many of the translations in addition to many other sacrifices on her part.

Dwelly's preface is of particular interest to the student of Scottish Gaelic, since many of the difficulties which he faced then are also applicable to today's Scottish Gaelic. Scottish Gaelic speakers were generally not taught to read and write in their native language and were therefore unable to provide correct spelling, which created enormous difficulties in preparing the dictionary. Scottish Gaelic speakers were also often reluctant to engage in Scottish Gaelic conversation with students of Scottish Gaelic such as Dwelly, generally preferring to speak to him in English. Dwelly often had to pose as a native speaker of Scottish Gaelic in order to obtain the opportunity to further his knowledge and understanding of colloquial Scottish Gaelic.

Dwelly's dictionary contains over 70,000 entries and is widely regarded as the most comprehensive dictionary of the Scottish Gaelic language compiled to date. So far, there have been over 12 printed editions (1920, 1930, 1941, 1949, 1967, 1971, 1973, 1977, 1988, 1993 and 2011) of the dictionary by various publishers.

== Digitisation of Dwelly ==
Making Dwelly available digitally, so it could be searched both as a Gaelic–English and an English–Gaelic dictionary, was a frequent request from Gaelic speakers, learners and enthusiasts. Due to a change in copyright law and various other complications, it eventually took a German learner of Scottish Gaelic, Michael Bauer, over 10 years to complete the digitisation. It was finally launched online in co-operation with Will Robertson, a software engineer from Perthshire, in January 2009 under the name Dwelly-d (short for Dwelly digiteach "Digital Dwelly").

Their work, carried out without any outside support, was subsequently commended in a motion in the Scottish Parliament on 6 January 2009 and an Early Day Motion in the Westminster Parliament on 14 January 2009.

== See also ==
- Scottish Gaelic dictionaries
