= Buchanhaven =

Village in Aberdeenshire, Scotland

Coordinates: 57.515977°N 1.795381°W

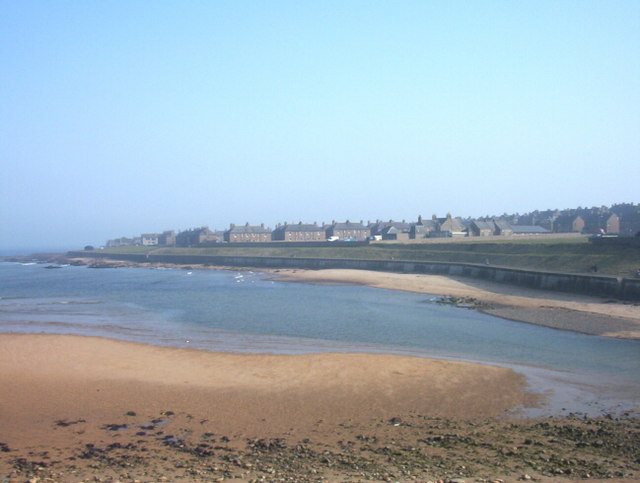
- Buchanhaven seen from the north bank of the Ugie

- Location within Aberdeenshire
- Council area: Aberdeenshire
- Country: Scotland
- Sovereign state: United Kingdom
- Post town: PETERHEAD
- Postcode district: AB42
- Police: Scotland
- Fire: Scottish
- Ambulance: Scottish
- UK Parliament: Aberdeenshire North and Moray East
- Scottish Parliament: Banffshire and Buchan Coast

Buchanhaven is a village in Aberdeenshire, Scotland, dating to around 1739. It is one mile north of Peterhead town centre, and near to the mouth of the River Ugie. It has its own school, Buchanhaven Primary School, which caters for children in Buchanhaven and the nearby Waterside estate. It is also the home of Buchanhaven Hearts F.C.

Originally "a good distance from Peterhead", the village was extended, by the feuing of two streets, by James Ferguson, the third Laird of Pitfour, in 1796.

== Harbour ==
Buchanhaven houses a small harbour with several boats. The harbour is owned by the Feuars Managers, but it is under the control of the Buchanhaven Harbour Trust.

The pier was built in the 19th century; it replaced a smaller, earlier pier built a few hundreds yards to the north. A diesel cable winch is situated at the top of the pier for the purpose of hauling boats from the slipway to the shore and vice versa.

== Fishing ==
The Annual Reports of the Fishery Board for Scotland provide an insight into fishing in Buchanhaven in the years before the First World War. For example, in the Report for 1900, we learn that "Only a few old men occasionally fish from this creek. The regular fishermen landing all their fish at Peterhead".

Fishery Statistics

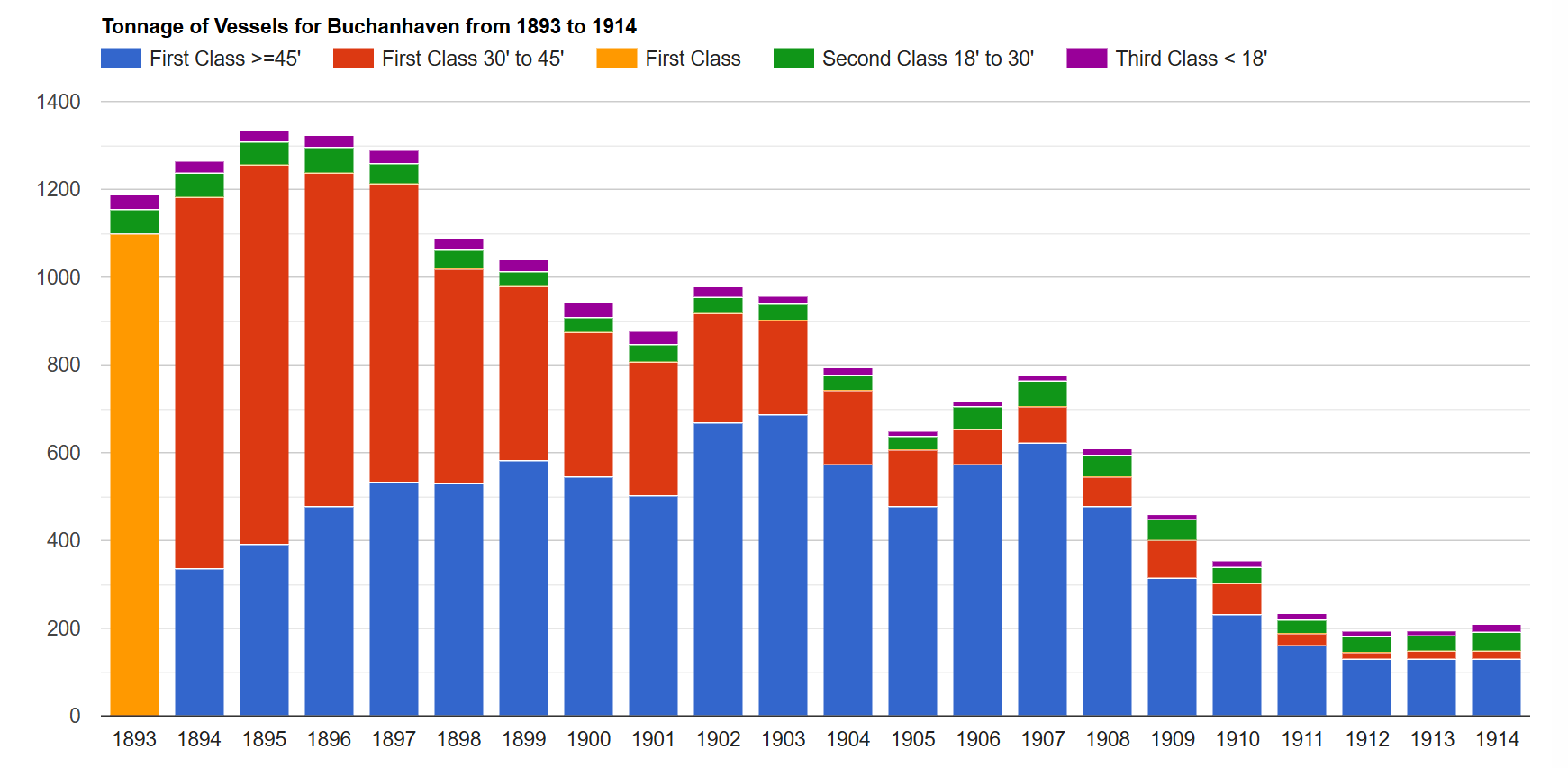
Tonnage of vessels

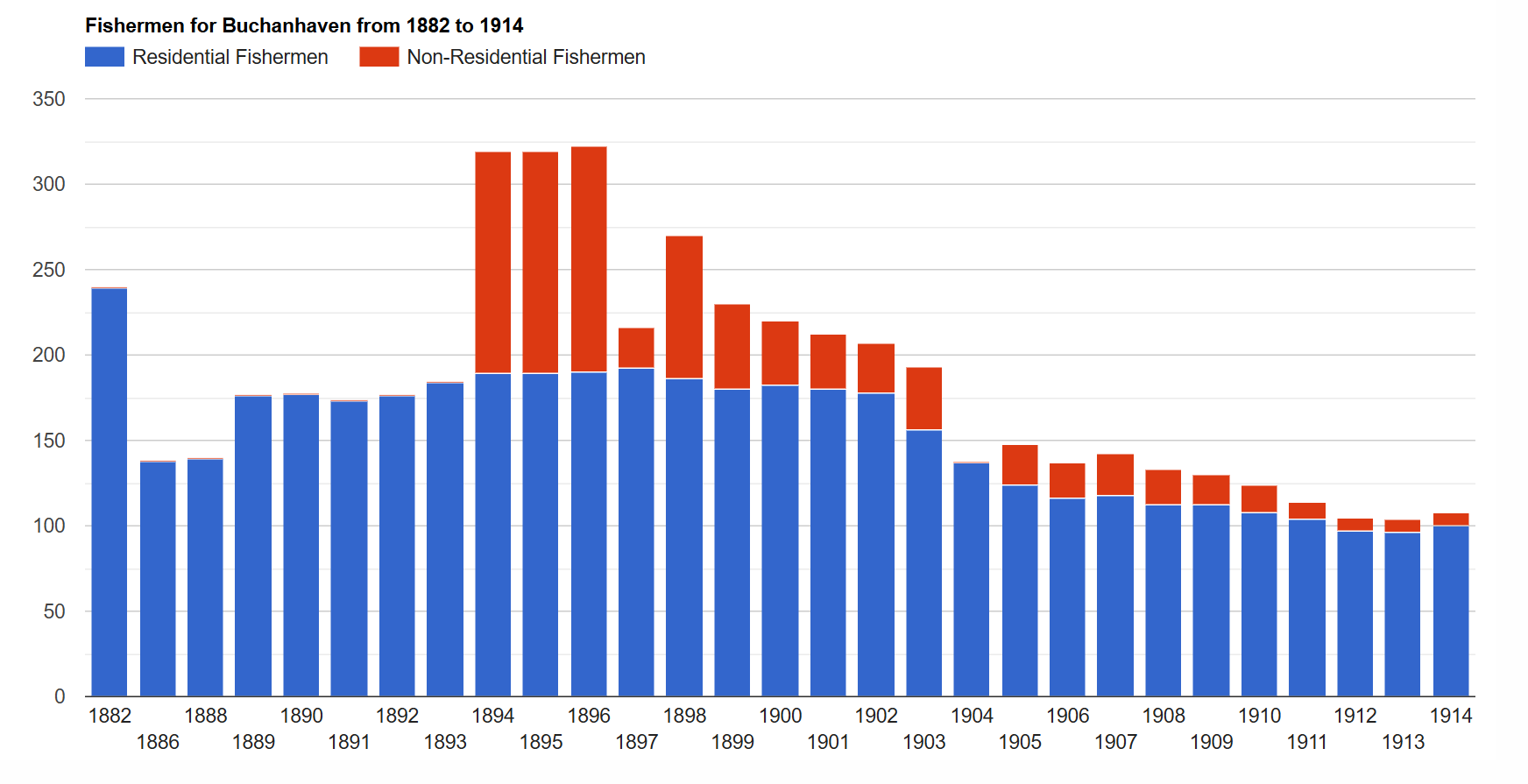
Cwt of fish landed

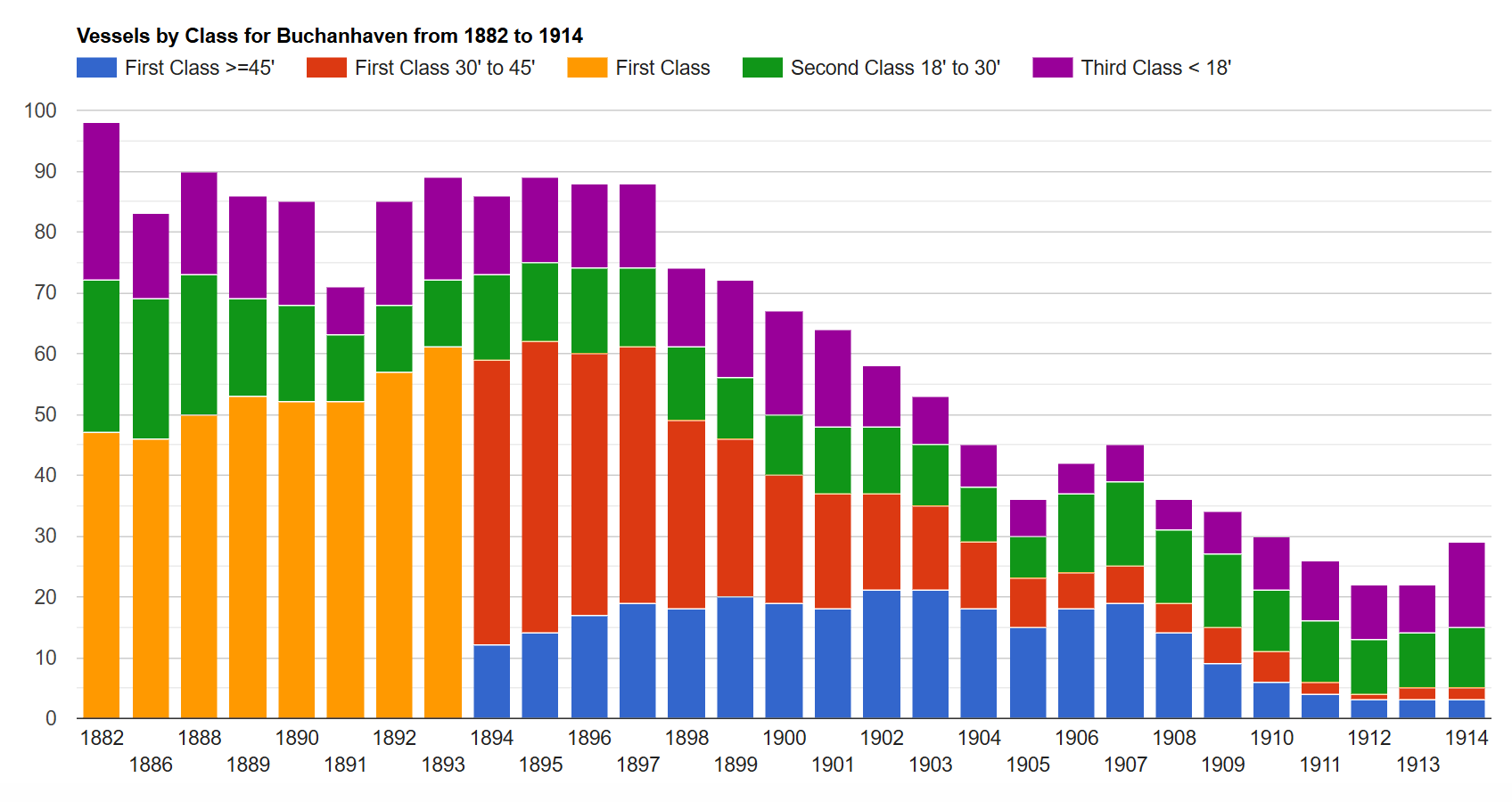
Vessels by class

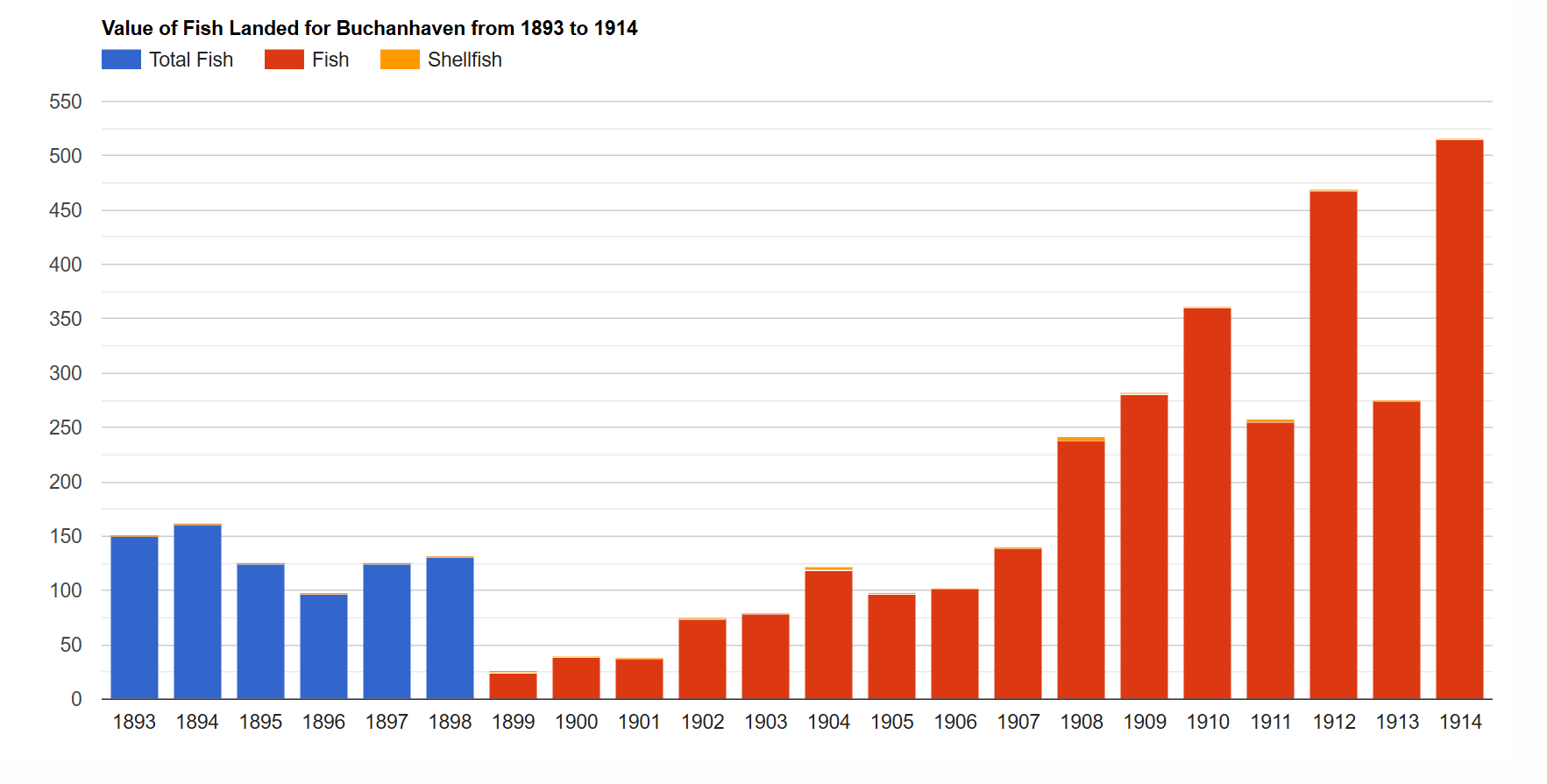
Value (£) of fish landed

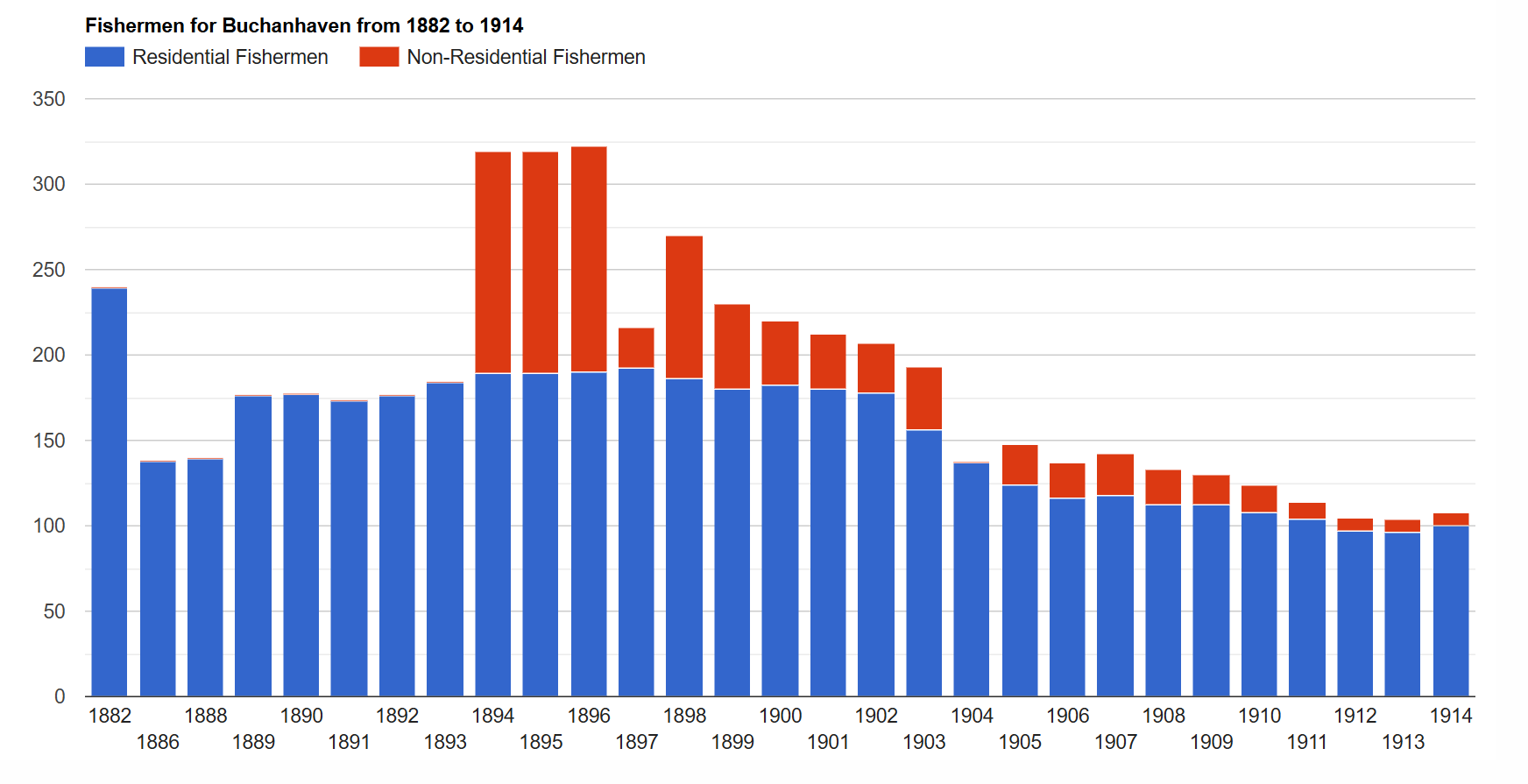
Fishermen

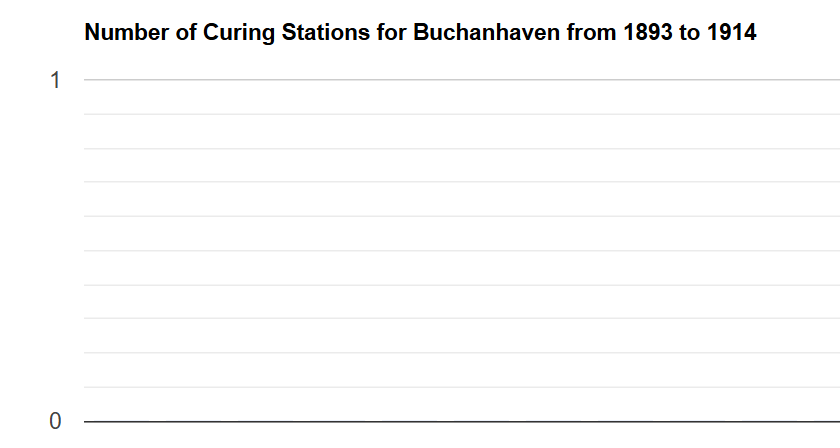
Placeholder- no curing stations

== Notable people ==
- Peter Buchan (1917–1991), poet, lived at 5 Harbour Street
