= Welsh toponymy =

Place names of Wales

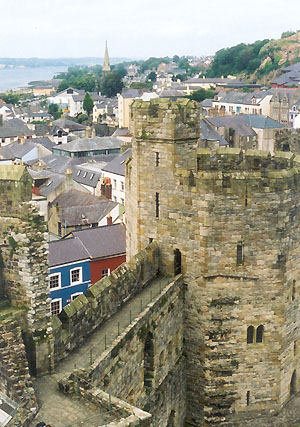
The castle at Caernarfon (meaning in Welsh "the fortress in Arfon"), which was formerly anglicised as "Carnarvon" or "Caernarvon". The name "Arfon" refers to the area "opposite Môn" or Anglesey.

Welsh toponymy is the study of the place-names of Wales, most of which are derived from the Welsh language, though others reflect linguistic contact with the Romans, Anglo-Saxons, Vikings, Anglo-Normans and modern English. Toponymy in Wales reveals significant features of the country's history and geography, as well as the development of the Welsh language. Its study is promoted by the Welsh Place-Name Society (Cymdeithas Enwau Lleoedd Cymru).

== History ==
During the 4th to 11th centuries, while Anglo-Saxons and other migrants from continental Europe settled adjoining areas of Britain, Wales developed as a distinctive entity, developing its language, culture, legal code, and political structures. By stages between the 11th and 16th centuries, Wales was then subdued, conquered and eventually incorporated into the Kingdom of England while still retaining many distinct cultural features, most notably its language. Since then, there has been a mixing of cultures in Wales, with the English language dominant in industry and commerce, but with Welsh remaining as a living language, particularly in its stronghold, y Fro Gymraeg or "Welsh language country" in northwest, mid- and west Wales. Welsh culture and political autonomy has been reasserted increasingly since the mid 19th century.

== Language characteristics ==
The Welsh language is a Western Brittonic language descended from the Common Brittonic spoken throughout Britain in the centuries before the Anglo-Saxon and Viking invasions that led to the creation of England. Many place-names in Britain, particularly of natural features such as rivers and hills, derive directly from Common Brittonic. Obvious examples of place-names of Welsh origin include Penrith ("headland by the ford") and the numerous Rivers Avon, from the Welsh afon ("river").

Place-names from the Western Brittonic-speaking Hen Ogledd occur in Cumbria and the Scottish Lowlands. These include the name of Edinburgh, from Cumbric Din Eidin "Eidin's Fort".

The Cornish language is a Southwestern Brittonic language and many place-names in Cornwall and to a lesser extent neighbouring Devon, Somerset and Dorset therefore have similar origins to names in Wales, such as the River Avon, Devon. The settlement name Tre- is identical to that used in Welsh and is among the most common placename elements in both Wales and Cornwall equating to English -ton, alongside Lan- equating to Welsh Llan- combined with the name of a Saint. In Devon the prevalent use of -combe reflects an early English borrowing of Cornish/Welsh cwm.

Welsh remains a living language, spoken by over 20% of the country's population. Like all languages, it has changed over time and continues to do so, for instance by accepting loan words from other languages such as Latin and English. The Welsh language itself has many characteristics unfamiliar to most English speakers that can make it difficult to understand its place-names. For example, it uses a number of initial consonant changes (called "mutations") in different grammatical circumstances. In relation to place-names, this means that, for example, a parish (llan) dedicated to one of the saints Mary (Mair) becomes Llanfair – the initial m of Mair changes to f (pronounced /v/) for grammatical reasons. Other changes can apply to internal vowels.

There are also differences between Welsh and English spelling standards, which have affected how place-names are spelled in the two languages. For instance, a single f in Welsh is always pronounced /v/ (or is silent), while ff is pronounced /f/; thus, the Welsh word for river, afon, is pronounced with a v-sound and so often spelled "Avon" when it appears in English place-names and river names.

== Development of place-names in Wales ==
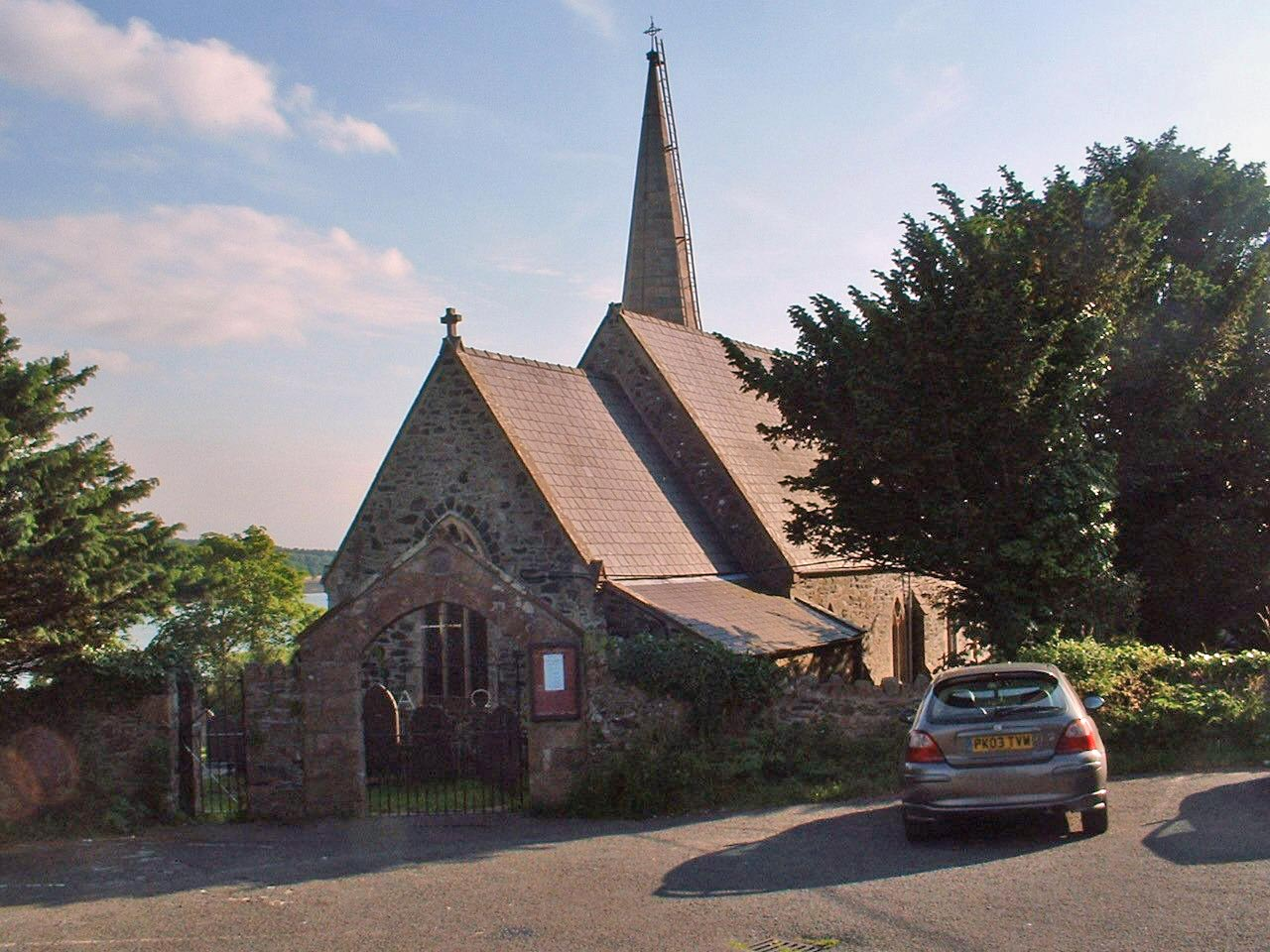
St. Mary's Church (Llanfair) gave its name to the village of Llanfairpwllgwyngyll in Anglesey

Early inhabitants of Wales gave names first to noteworthy natural features, such as rivers, hills, mountains, harbours and shores. Before the Roman occupation in the first century, there does not seem to have been a coming together in organised settlements, and therefore little reason to give names to such places. The Roman towns which were established were generally fortified and were given the generic name of castra, which in Welsh became caer, originally with the meaning of "fortified enclosure". Many of these continued as towns after the Romans left, including Caernarfon, Carmarthen (Caerfyrddin), Caerleon, and Caerwent.

Elsewhere, many villages and later towns took their names from natural features. For example, Abergele refers to the "mouth of the [river] Gele", Harlech means "fair rock", Rhuddlan "red bank", and Porthcawl "harbour with sea-kale". Aberystwyth means "mouth of the Ystwyth", a river a mile or so away from the town centre, and was apparently so named as a result of confusion by the English over the different castles in the area.

Many others took their name from religious settlements and clasau (monasteries) established from the fifth century onwards. These generally use the prefix llan, roughly equivalent to "parish". Most of them are dedicated to their founders, who hailed from local dynasties and were venerated as patron saints. Examples include Llandudno ("Saint Tudno's"), Llanelli ("Saint Elli's"), and Llantwit ("Illtud's"). Following the Norman invasion of Wales, some were rededicated to more generic saints: Llanilar ("Saint Hilary's"), Llanfoist ("Saint Faith's"). A few—usually by mistake—include other elements or none at all: Llan, Powys, Llanharry, Llangefni ("Parish by the Afon Cefni"). Other religious place-names include merthyr ("martyr") and eglwys ("church").

Over the centuries, Welsh place-names have been variously affected by social and economic changes in the country. The Industrial Revolution saw the development of many new towns and villages, particularly in south Wales. Some of these used already existing place-names, while others acquired new names. For example, the towns of Port Talbot and Tredegar took the names of their main landowners and developers. In north Wales, Porthmadog was originally named "Portmadoc" by its developer William Madocks, to commemorate both his own name and that of the possibly mythical sailor Madoc. An early example of a publicity stunt saw the village of Llanfairpwllgwyngyll ("St Mary's church beside the hollow with white hazels") renaming itself in the 1860s with an even longer title, in an attempt to keep its railway station open.

Common elements of Welsh place-names thus include both words for topographical features and words reflecting human influence. Some of the most frequently encountered place-name elements in Wales are shown in the table below. The Welsh version shown is the original, unmutated reference form.

Welsh	English
aber	confluence of water bodies, 'outpouring' of water
afon	river
allt	hillside, wood
ardd	hill/upland, garden
bach	little
bedd	grave
betws	chapel, oratory
blaen, blaenau	source(s) of stream, upland
bro	vale, lowland
bron	hillside, breast (of hill)
bryn	hill
bwlch	gap in hills, pass
cae	field, enclosure
caer	fort, stronghold
capel	chapel
carn, carnedd	cairn (a heap of stones)
cas, castell	castle
cefn	ridge
cei	quay
cil	corner, nook, recess
clog, clogwyn	steep cliff
coed	forest, wood
cors	bog
craig	rock
croes	cross, crossroads
crug	hillock
cwm	valley
cymer	confluence
din	hill fort
dinas	city
dol	meadow
dwfr, dŵr	water
dyffryn	valley
eglwys	church
erw	acre
ffin	boundary
ffordd	road
ffos	ditch, dike
ffridd	mountain pasture
ffynnon	spring
garth	a ridge, also an enclosure
glan	bank of river, shore
glyn	deep valley
gwaun	moorland
hafod	summer farmstead
hafn	ravine
hendre	winter farmstead
llan	parish, parish church
llannerch	clearing
llech	covert, slate
llyn	lake
maen	stone
mawr	big
melin	mill
merthyr	martyrium
moel	bare hill
môr	sea
morfa	salt marsh
mynydd	mountain, moorland
nant	brook, small valley
newydd	new
ogof	cave
pandy	fulling mill
pant	hollow, valley
parc	park, field
pen	head, end
penrhyn	promontory
pentre	homestead, village
Pîl, Pill	tidal area of a waterway, used as a harbour
pistyll	well, spout
plas	hall, mansion
pont	bridge
porth	harbour, gateway
pwll	pool
rhaeadr	waterfall
rhiw	hill, slope
rhos	moor, promontory
rhyd	ford
sarn	causeway
sir	county, shire
stryd	street
tafarn	inn, tavern
ton	lea
traeth	beach
tref	village, town
tŷ	house
y, yr, 'r	the
ynys	island, river-meadow
ysbyty	hospital
ysgol	school
ystrad	valley (floor)

== Relationship between Welsh and English place-names ==
In the majority of cases in Wales, the Welsh and English names for a place are identical, almost always because the Welsh name is used. So, for example, Aberystwyth, Blaenau Ffestiniog, Bangor, Machynlleth and Llandudno all have the same spelling in Welsh and English, although it is also often the case that many English people do not pronounce the name in the same way as the Welsh.

There are also many instances where the Welsh and English names are very similar, both in spelling and pronunciation. Examples are Caerphilly (Caerffili), Raglan (Rhaglan), Treorchy (Treorci), Barry (Y Barri) and Merthyr Tydfil (Merthyr Tudful). In most of these cases, English usage adopted and anglicised the Welsh name, although there are some cases, especially close to the English border, where the English name was adopted by the Welsh. Examples are Flint (Y Fflint) and Wrexham (Wrecsam) in north east Wales, and Caldicot (Cil-y-coed) in south east Wales. A related case is the Norman French foundation of Beaumaris (Biwmares). In a few cases, such as Prestatyn (originally "priest's town", which elsewhere became "Preston") and Mostyn, the original name was wholly English but has gradually taken on a Welsh appearance. In some cases this in fact results from Welsh having preserved an earlier stage of English pronunciation; as is the case in Prestatyn (Old English Preostatun /'pre:əstɑtu:n/) or the mountain Cnicht ("knight"), Old/Middle English pronunciation /knɪɕt/. This also occurs in reverse; eg English Severn preserves the Proto-Celtic [s] which became [h] in modern Welsh (Hafren). In one or two others, such as Caergwrle, the name combines Welsh (caer) and English elements – the village was originally the English settlement of Corley.

In some cases, the spelling formerly used in English has, over the past few decades, ceased to be accepted – examples are Caernarfon (formerly, in English, Ca(e)rnarvon), Conwy (formerly Conway), and Llanelli (formerly Llanelly). Most of these examples are in predominantly Welsh-speaking areas of Wales. There are also places where there are ongoing disagreements over whether the Welsh spelling should be used exclusively or not, such as Criccieth (Cricieth), Rhayader (Rhaeadr), and Ruthin (Rhuthun).

In other cases, the Welsh and English names clearly share the same original form, but spellings and pronunciation have diverged over the years. One obvious example is Cardiff (Caerdydd). The medieval Welsh form was Caerdyf (with a final [v]) from which are derived the modern English Cardiff (with a final /f/) and the modern Welsh Caerdydd (with a final [ð]). Some examples of the anglicisation of place-names are the towns of Denbigh and Tenby, both derived from the Welsh name Dinbych ("little fort"); Pembroke (from Penfro, literally "land's end"); Lampeter (from Llanbedr, in full Llanbedr Pont Steffan); Skenfrith (from Ynysgynwraidd); and Barmouth (in modern Welsh Y Bermo, but originally Aber-mawdd, meaning "mouth of the [river] Mawdd(ach))".

Finally, there are a number of places, listed in the table below, where the English and Welsh names have, or may appear to have, different origins. These have developed for a variety of reasons. Brecon and Cardigan both took their English names from their surrounding historic kingdoms, but took their Welsh names from local rivers; almost the reverse process occurred at Usk. Names given by Norse settlers, such as Swansea, Fishguard and Anglesey, tended to be adopted in English usage but not by the Welsh. Again, there are exceptions such as the island of Skomer (from Norse words meaning "cloven island"). English names for the Great Orme and Worm's Head both derive from the Norse word orm, referring to their shape resembling a serpent's head.

== Places in Wales whose Welsh and English names appear substantially different ==
English name	Welsh name	Notes
Anglesey	Ynys Môn	English name derived from Norse meaning "Ongull's island", Welsh name related to (but probably predated) Roman Latin Mona
Bangor-on-Dee	Bangor Is-coed	English name refers to the village's proximity to the River Dee. Welsh name means "Bangor (a settlement within a wattle fence) below the wood/trees"
Bardsey	Ynys Enlli	English name derived from Norse meaning "Bard's island" ("Bard" probably being a person's name), Welsh name probably originally Ynys Fenlli, "Benlli's island", or possibly from Old Welsh Ynis en Lliv meaning "Island in (the) Tide".
Blackwood	Coed-duon	Both English and Welsh names mean "black woodland"
Brecon	Aberhonddu	English name derived from Brycheiniog, Welsh from River Honddu
Bridgend	Pen-y-bont (ar Ogwr)	Both English and Welsh names mean "end of the bridge"
Builth (Wells)	Llanfair-ym-Muallt	Both English and Welsh names derive from the original Welsh Buellt, meaning "cow pasture", with the Welsh name mutating with the additional reference to "St Mary's church"
Cardigan	Aberteifi	English name derived from Ceredigion, Welsh from River Teifi
Chepstow	Cas-gwent	English name meaning "place with market", Welsh meaning "castle of Gwent"
Chirk	Y Waun	English name derived from Norse "Kirk", which at some point became mixed with the modern English translation "Church," Welsh meaning "the heath"
Cowbridge	Y Bont-faen	English name meaning "bridge used by cows", Welsh meaning "the stone bridge"
Fishguard	Abergwaun	English name derived from Norse meaning "fish yard", Welsh from River Gwaun
Haverfordwest	Hwlffordd	English name means "western ford used by goats". Haverford means "ford used by goats"; West was added in the fifteenth century to distinguish the town from Hereford. Welsh name is derived from the English name.
Hawarden	Penarlâg	English name meaning "high enclosure", Welsh meaning "high ground rich in cattle"
Hay (-on-Wye)	Y Gelli (Gandryll)	Both English and Welsh names mean "enclosed forest"
Holyhead	Caergybi	English name meaning "holy headland", Welsh meaning "St. Cybi's fort"
Knighton	Tref-y-clawdd	English name meaning "town of the knights", Welsh meaning "town beside [Offa's] dyke"
Menai Bridge	Porthaethwy	English name applied after bridge over Menai Strait opened in 1826, Welsh meaning "ferry of Daethwy people"
Milford (Haven)	Aberdaugleddau	English name derived from Norse meaning "sandy inlet", Welsh from Daugleddau estuary (i.e. the two Cleddau rivers)
Mold	Yr Wyddgrug	English name from Norman French "mont hault" or "high hill", Welsh meaning "the mound with burial cairn"
Monmouth	Trefynwy	Both names derive from the local river Mynwy or Monnow, the English name meaning "mouth of the Monnow" and the Welsh meaning "town on the Mynwy", the initial m mutating to f
Montgomery	Trefaldwyn	English name from that of Norman lord who built castle, Welsh meaning "Baldwin's town"
Mountain Ash	Aberpennar	English name from inn around which industrial development took place, Welsh from River Pennar
Neath	Castell-nedd	English name from the River Neath, an anglicised version of Nedd; Welsh meaning "fort of (the river) Neath"
Newport	Casnewydd	English name meaning "new borough", Welsh meaning "new castle (on the River Usk)"
Newport, Pembrokeshire	Trefdraeth	English name meaning "new borough", Welsh meaning "town by the shore"
New Radnor	Maesyfed	English name meaning "red bank" originally applied to Old Radnor, Welsh meaning "Hyfaidd's field"
Newtown	Y Drenewydd	Both English and Welsh names mean "(the) new town"
Old Radnor	Pencraig	English name meaning "red bank", Welsh name meaning "head of the rock"
Presteigne	Llanandras	English name meaning "house of priests", Welsh meaning "St. Andreas' church"
Snowdon	Yr Wyddfa	English name meaning "snowy hill", Welsh meaning "the burial mound". The Welsh name for Snowdonia, attested since the Middle Ages, is Eryri, meaning "highlands" or "upland" – the traditional interpretation as "place of the eagles" (eryr, "eagle") has been shown to be etymologically incorrect
St Asaph	Llanelwy	English name from dedication of cathedral, Welsh meaning "church on the river Elwy"
St Dogmaels	Llandudoch	Possibly both names refer to the same saint or founder, with 'mael' (prince) and 'tud' (land or people of) being added to Dog/doch as in Dog mael and Tud doch
Swansea	Abertawe	English name derived from Norse meaning "Sveyn's island", Welsh from local river Tawe
Usk	Brynbuga	English name from River Usk (originally Welsh Wysg), Welsh meaning "Buga's hill"
Welshpool	Y Trallwng	Both English and Welsh names mean "(the) boggy area", with the English name adding "Welsh", possibly to distinguish it from Poole in Dorset.

== Official policy on place-names in Wales ==
The naming of places in Wales can be a matter of dispute and uncertainty. In some cases there is an issue of whether both the Welsh and English names should be used, or only one, and which should be given priority. In other cases it is because usage and style have changed over the years, and there is debate over which form or spelling of a placename should be used. Both the Welsh Government and the Ordnance Survey have policies on standardising place-names, drawing on advice from the Welsh Language Commissioner and the Place-name Research Centre at the University of Wales, Bangor.

The policy of the Welsh Government on place-names as shown on road signs within its jurisdiction is set out in its Welsh Language Scheme. This states: "The signs for which we are responsible (mostly motorway and trunk road signs) will be bilingual. Signs which are in English only at the moment will be made bilingual when they are replaced.... When both languages are included on one sign with one language above the other, the order in which the languages appear will follow the practice adopted by the local authority where the sign is located." The latter proviso applies because local authorities have discretion over the forms used on local highway signs. In the predominantly Welsh-speaking areas of Wales, the Welsh form of the name is usually given first; in other areas, the English name is usually given first.

The guidance also states: "Signs containing place names in England will contain the Welsh and English versions of the name....". This proviso has led to new motorway signs in south Wales showing the names Llundain and Bryste as well as their English-language names, London and Bristol. In May 2026, Welsh councillor Einir Williams criticized Ordnance Survey 'for using names that have "no basis in tradition" across online, signs and publications'.

== Welsh names for other places in Great Britain and Ireland ==
The modern Welsh language contains names for many towns and other geographical features across Britain and Ireland. In some cases, these derive from the Brythonic names which were used during or before the Roman occupation: for example, Llundain (London), Cernyw (Cornwall), Dyfnaint (Devon), and Ebrauc/Efrog (York). The origin of the modern Welsh name for England itself, Lloegr [ɬɔiɡr], is disputed.

Many English county towns, founded as Roman castra and now having the English suffix "-c(h)ester", also have Welsh names, in most cases using the prefix Caer-. Examples include Caer or Caerlleon (for Chester), Caerloyw (Gloucester), Caerwrangon (Worcester), Caergrawnt (Cambridge, from Grantchester), and Caerwynt (Winchester). In some other cases, Welsh names are translations of the English name, often influenced by the Welsh poetic tradition – for example, Rhydychen (literally, "oxen ford") for Oxford, and Gwlad-yr-haf ("land of summer") for Somerset. There are some erroneous "translations" such as Rhydwely for Bedford, which is actually derived from an English personal name Beda, and not the noun "bed" (Welsh (g)wely). Some English cities which have developed more recently, but with which Welsh people have had commercial links through trading or other economic associations such as through population migration, have developed Welsh forms of their English names. Examples are Bryste (Bristol) and Lerpwl (Liverpool), although some claim that Liverpool has a possible Welsh derivation from "Y Llif", a name for the Atlantic Ocean and meaning "the flood" together with "pwll" which represents the word Pool in English place names and is generally accepted as of Brythonic origin.. However such a name is impossible in Welsh, and would certainly could not have given "Liverpool", whose origin is clearly Old English

A final set of Welsh place-names are those for settlements in England which lie close to the modern border with Wales. In some cases, such as Ross-on-Wye (Rhosan-ar-Wy) and probably Leominster (Llanllieni), the English name seems to have derived from the Welsh name. In other cases, such as Llwydlo (Ludlow) and Henffordd (Hereford), the Welsh name derived from the English name of the settlement. The Welsh name for Shrewsbury, Yr Amwythig, means "the fort in scrubland", which is one theory of the origin of the English name. Oswestry ("Oswald's tree") is in Welsh Croesoswallt ("Oswald's cross") – although Old English treow in fact meant "cross" as well as "tree".

== See also ==
- Aber and Inver as place-name elements
- Celtic onomastics
- Celtic toponymy
- Cumbrian toponymy
- Irish toponymy
- List of generic forms in place names in the United Kingdom and Ireland
- Llan place name element
- Scottish toponymy
- Toponymy in Great Britain
- Welsh Place-Name Society
- Welsh place names in other countries
- Welsh surnames
- Recommended place-names in Snowdonia
