= Amroth (electoral ward) =

Electoral ward in Pembrokeshire, Wales

Amroth was the name of a county electoral ward in Pembrokeshire, Wales. It covered the community of Amroth which, as well as the village of Amroth included Summerhill, Stepaside, Pleasant Valley and Wiseman's Bridge and well as the hamlets at Llanteg and Llanteglos.

A ward of Pembrokeshire County Council since 1995, it was previously a ward of the former South Pembrokeshire District Council.

Following the recommendations of a boundary review by the Local Government Boundary Commission for Wales, effective from the 2022 local elections, the Amroth county ward was merged with the north part of the neighbouring community of Saundersfoot to create a new ward of 'Amroth and Saundersfoot North'.

== Community Council ==
Amroth is also the name of a community ward which covers Amroth village, Pleasant Valley, Stepaside and Wisemans Bridge. It can elect up to nine councillors to Amroth Community Council. The other community ward is Crunwere.

== County Council ==
At the first election for the new Pembrokeshire County Council in 1995, a Liberal Democrat county councillor was elected unopposed.

Amroth 1995
Party	Candidate	Votes	%	±%
Liberal Democrats	Ronald Young Cameron	unopposed		

Faced with a three-way election in 1999, the Liberal Democrats lost to the Conservative Party. Councillor Tony Brinsden re-took the ward in 2004 for the Liberal Democrats, holding the seat in 2008. In May 2012 he stood and won as an independent. A local man and former policeman, Cllr Brinsden became Chairman of Pembrokeshire County Council in May 2016.

Amroth Community Council had its first contested election in 29 years in May 2008, when fifteen candidates put themselves forward for the nine seats available to the Amroth community ward.

== See also ==
- List of electoral wards in Pembrokeshire
