= Saundersfoot Railway =

Industrial railway line in Wales

Overview
- Headquarters: Saundersfoot
- Locale: Wales
- Dates of operation: 1829–1939
- Successor: abandoned

Technical
- Track gauge: 4 ft (1,219 mm)

The Saundersfoot Railway was a Welsh industrial narrow-gauge railway in Pembrokeshire, Wales, built between 1830 and 1834, to connect Saundersfoot harbour to the local coal mines. It opened on 1 March 1834 and within a few years it comprised a small network of over 4 miles (6.4 km) along the coast from Saundersfoot to Wisemans Bridge and on to the collieries at Stepaside and Kilgetty, and later, running inland to Thomas Chapel near Begelly.

It provides the first example in Pembrokeshire of the joint construction of a harbour and tramway, and remained independent until it closed in 1939.

== History ==
Saundersfoot Railway and Harbour Act 1829
- Act of Parliament
- Parliament of the United Kingdom
- Long title: An Act for making a Railway from Thomas Chapel in the Parish of Begelly to Saundersfoot, with Two Branches therefrom, and a Harbour at Saundersfoot, in the County of Pembroke.
- Citation: 10 Geo. 4. c. cviii

Dates
- Royal assent: 1 June 1829

Text of statute as originally enacted

Saundersfoot Railway and Harbour (Extension and Branch Lines) Act 1842
- Act of Parliament
- Parliament of the United Kingdom
- Long title: An Act for authorizing the Saundersfoot Railway and Harbour Company to make an Extension of their present Railway, and also to make Two Branches from such Railway respectively within the County of Pembroke; and for extending the Provisions of the Act relating to the said Company.
- Citation: 5 & 6 Vict. c. xxxv

Dates
- Royal assent: 31 May 1842

Text of statute as originally enacted

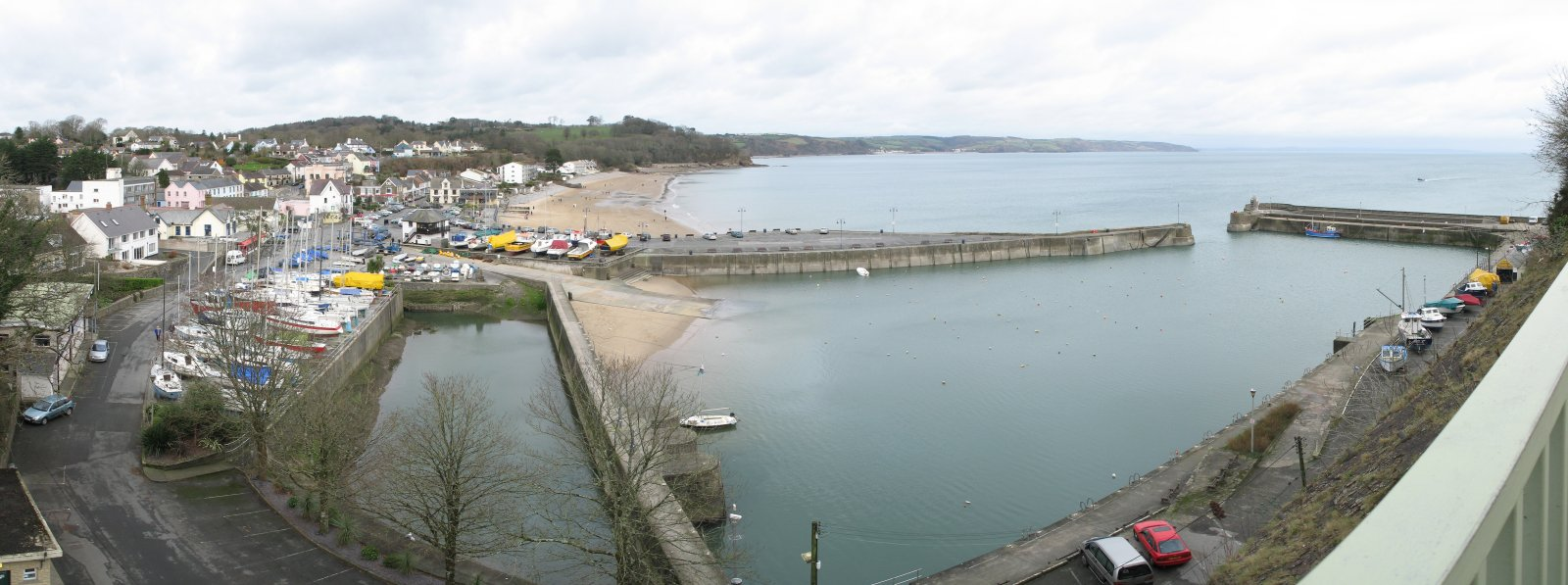
The railway originally ran down the street (left) directly onto the harbour breakwaters at Saundersfoot.

There were worthwhile deposits of high quality anthracite in the Saundersfoot area; part of the Pembrokeshire Coalfield. To move the extracted coal to the coast for onward shipping transport, a tramroad was proposed. The Saundersfoot Railway and Harbour Company was formed in 1828 to build a harbour at Saundersfoot and a tramway to connect it to the collieries around Begelly and Stepaside. In 1829, authorisation was given for the Saundersfoot Railway and Harbour Company by the Saundersfoot Railway and Harbour Act 1829 (10 Geo. 4. c. cviii). This was to be a 4 ft (1,219 mm) gauge horse operated tramroad, connecting collieries with a new harbour at Saundersfoot.

The tramway, which consisted of two main mineral lines and a number of small branches, originally used horses to pull up to three laden wagons along the tracks. Of the two main lines, the first was built to connect the collieries near Stepaside and the later ironworks using local iron ore at Stepaside, and run along the coast through a series of short tunnels to terminate in the centre of Saundersfoot at the harbour.

One important branch line was used to transport anthracite from Bonville's Court Colliery to the Harbour in Saundersfoot, this line traversed a 1 in 5 (200‰) incline powered by a steam engine and Gravity, the incline and engine house is still there.

The second line ran from the harbour to Thomas Chapel colliery near Begelly. The route, left the main line at Coalpit haul, (Now known as Coppet hall), passed beneath the GWR station through a tunnel at King's Moor.

When the South Wales Railway was authorised, the directors of the Saundersfoot Railway and Harbour Company decided to seek powers to build a line linking both Tenby and Saundersfoot to the SWR Pembroke branch at Reynalton. This was authorised in 1846 as the Tenby, Saundersfoot and South Wales Railway and Pier Company, with authorised capital of £140,000. The South Wales Railway opened its line as far as Haverfordwest on 2 January 1854, and to Neyland on 15 April 1856. However, the South Wales Railway did not attempt to build their Pembroke branch, so construction of the Tenby and Saundersfoot line was not started. As part of a modernisation project, the whole line was upgraded to a narrow gauge railway in 1874. The tramway was relaid with flat bottom rails on wooden sleepers allowing a locomotive to be used on the line to Stepaside.

Following the cessation of large-scale mining near Begelly, the track from the King's Moor tunnel to Thomas Chapel was lifted in 1887. In around 1914, it was re-laid and a new 1 1/2-mile (2.4 km) branch line built to support the opening of a short-lived colliery at Reynalton. A new engine was purchased for this purpose.

But by the late 1920s coal mining was in recession and the line closed. In 1932 a brief resurgence in local mining led to the lines being briefly reopened.

However, only seven years later, due to financial considerations and the workings becoming exhausted, the railway finally closed on the eve of the Second World War. Subsequently, the rolling stock along with the tracks were scrapped for use in the war effort.

== Today ==
The section of the route that follows the coastline from Saundersfoot to Wisemans Bridge is now a 4 miles (6.4 km) part of the Pembrokeshire Coast Path. Walkers using the trail pass through three tunnels on the former line.

== Locomotives ==
Both engines used on the line had low profiles so they could work the tunnels. Although Rosalind was scrapped, Bulldog continued to work at Llanelli steel works until 1951.

Name	Builder	Wheel arrangement	Date	Works number	Notes
Rosalind	Manning Wardle	0-4-0ST	1874	476	
Bulldog	Kerr Stuart	0-4-0ST	1915	2401	Purchased from the New Reynalton Anthracite Coal Company in 1921

== Bibliography ==
- Price, M.R.C. (1963). The Saundersfoot Railway. The Oakwood Press.
