= Crunwere =

Village and parish in Pembrokeshire, Wales

Crunwere: Welsh: Cronwern
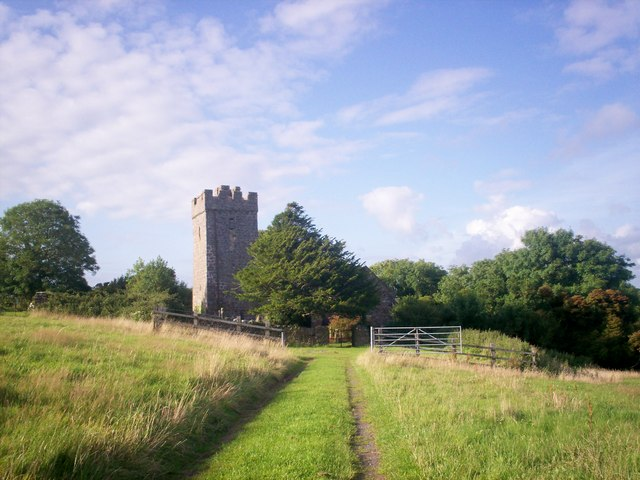
- Crunwere Church

- Location within Pembrokeshire
- OS grid reference: SN186108
- Community: Amroth
- Principal area: Pembrokeshire
- Country: Wales
- Sovereign state: United Kingdom
- Police: Dyfed-Powys
- Fire: Mid and West Wales
- Ambulance: Welsh

Crunwere (Welsh: Cronwern - also written Crunwear and Cronwere) is a hamlet and parish in Pembrokeshire, Wales. It is situated 3 km north of the Carmarthen Bay coast, 8 km north-east of Saundersfoot. The parish includes the village of Llanteg and sub-hamlet of Llanteglos 51°45′19″N 4°38′43″W. Together with the village of Amroth, it constitutes the community of Amroth.

== Name ==
The Welsh placename means "round alder swamp": the English form is a corruption of the Welsh. Part of Little England beyond Wales, although close to the Pembrokeshire language frontier, it has been predominantly English-speaking for centuries.

== History ==
1849 Description of Parish -

CRONWERE (CRUNWEAR), a parish, in the union and hundred of Narberth, county of Pembroke, South Wales, 5 miles (E. S. E.) from Narberth; containing 282 inhabitants. This parish is situated on the eastern confines of the county, a short distance south of the turnpike-road from Laugharne to Narberth. It is bounded on the north by Lampeter, on the south by Amroath, on the west by Ludchurch, and on the east by Carmarthenshire, from which it is separated by a small brook. The number of acres is about 2000, of which 1500 are arable, and 500 pasture. The surface is of a hilly character: the soil is various; red earth, affording rich pasture, extends across a portion of the parish in a direction from north to south; other parts are cold and sterile, with a subsoil of clay; the earth covering the limestone portion is good, but liable to become soon parched and dry. There is a village named Lanteague, the only one in the parish; also a corn-mill, and a mill where the coarse cloth of the country is prepared and dyed: a quarry is likewise worked, producing limestone of fine quality. The living is a discharged rectory, rated in the king's books at £6. 16. 10½., and in the patronage of the Lord Chancellor: the tithes have been commuted for a rent-charge of £105; there is a glebe-house, and the glebe contains sixty-eight acres, valued at £50 per annum. The church, dedicated to St. Elidyr, is a very ancient structure, now nearly in ruins, and contains 200 sittings. A Sunday school was established in the year 1820.

== Parish ==
The parish had an area of 689 Ha. Its census populations were: 191 (1801): 289 (1851): 188 (1901): 160 (1951): 164 (1981). The percentage of Welsh speakers was 16 (1891): 12 (1931): 15 (1971)

Crunwere Church (St Elidyr) is now declared redundant and the last service (open-air) held on 2 August 2009.

== Governance ==
Crunwere is included in the Amroth electoral ward for elections to Pembrokeshire County Council. Crunwere is also a community electoral ward (the other being 'Amroth') which elects or co-opts up to three community councillors to Amroth Community Council.
