= Sardis, southeast Pembrokeshire =

Village in Pembrokeshire, Wales

Coordinates: 51.726604°N 4.696289°W

Sardis
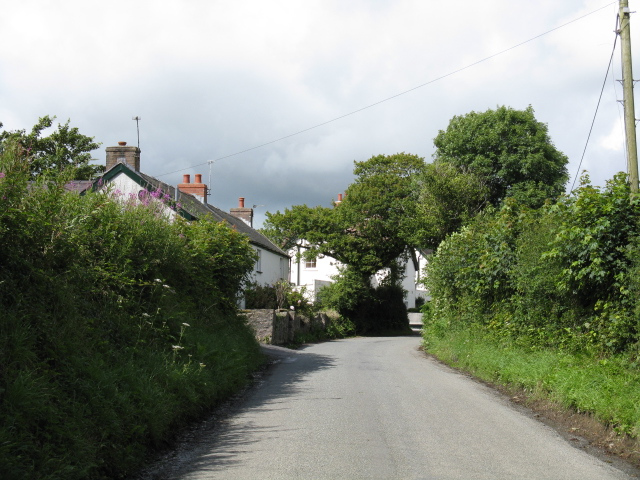
- Cottages in Sardis

- Location within Pembrokeshire
- Community: Saundersfoot
- Principal area: Pembrokeshire
- Preserved county: Dyfed
- Country: Wales
- Sovereign state: United Kingdom

Sardis is a small village in Pembrokeshire, belonging to the Community of Saundersfoot. It lies just south of Stepaside and northwest of Wisemans Bridge in the Pembrokeshire Coast National Park. The area is busier during the summer months when tourists stay at the nearby caravan parks in Wisemans Bridge and Amroth. It contains a small chapel called Sardis Congregational Church, established in 1808 in the northern part of the village.

== Location ==
Sardis lies to the northeast of Saundersfoot in the Pembrokeshire Coast National Park. The Park literature describes the locality as

a pleasant area of valleys with some visual links to the coast along Saundersfoot Bay. It contains several other small villages including Summerhill, Amroth, Wiseman’s Bridge and Sardis, set amongst wooded areas along several small valleys with streams flowing to the coast. The valley sides are largely wooded with mixed species of trees within a wider agricultural landscape

== Geography ==
Around Sardis is a mix of deciduous woods and coniferous plantations interspersed with agricultural land. There is evidence of historic coal mining. The village sits at 80m above sea level less than one mile from the coast at Wiseman's Bridge.

To the east of the village the hill is known as Sardis Mountain, though no higher than the village. To the southwest, there is "Harry's Tump" whose origin is obscure ("tump" refers to a small hill), but the historic name is recorded by the Royal Commission.

== Church ==
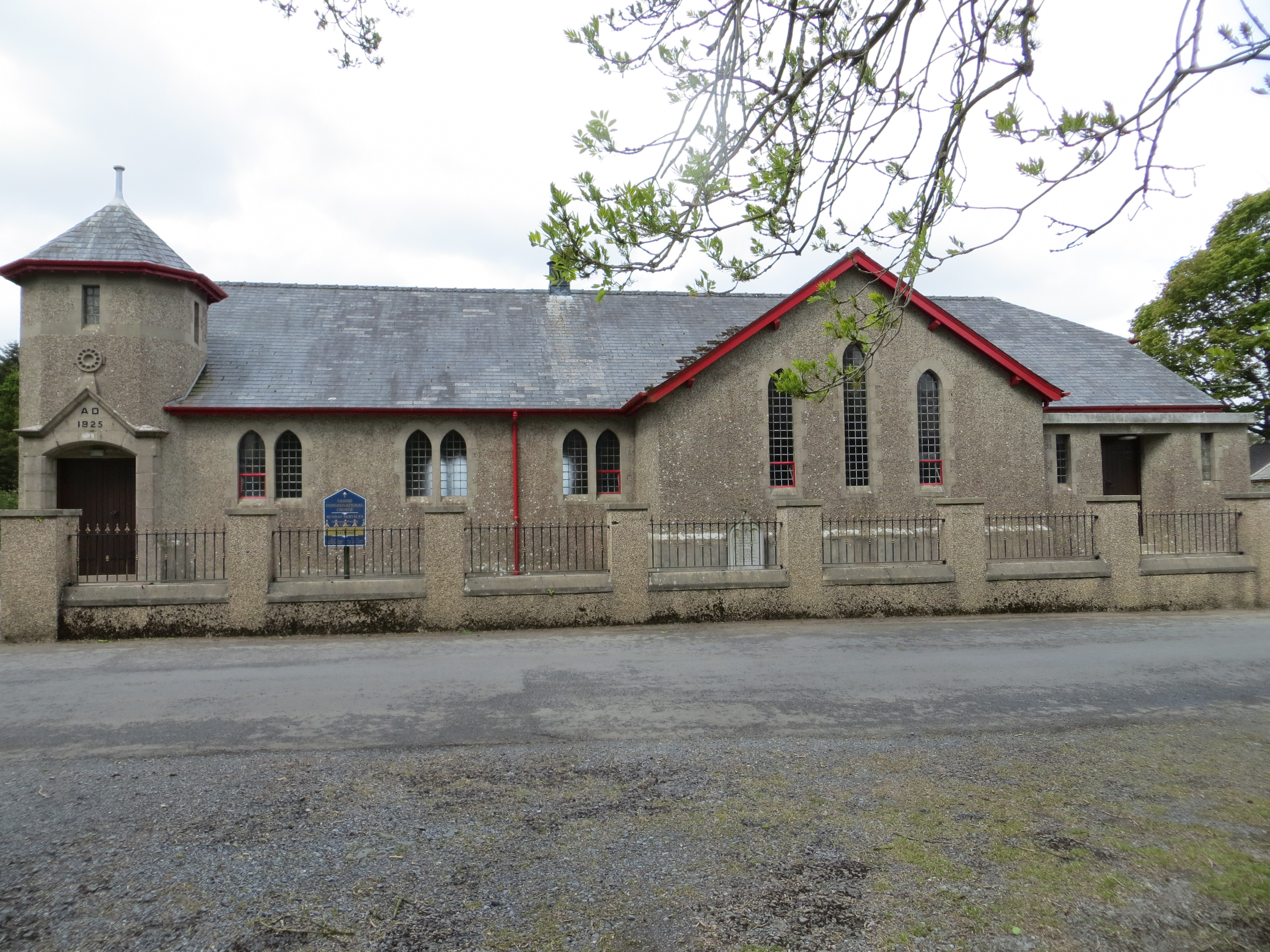
Sardis Congregational Church

Sardis Congregational Church, in the north of the village, was first built in 1808. It was rebuilt in 1825, and again in 1924 in the Gothic style. It is recorded by the Royal Commission. William Thomas was largely responsible for the establishment of the chapels in Sardis and Saundersfoot and saw to the building of several others. The chapel celebrated its 100th anniversary in 2024.
