= Pleasant Valley, Pembrokeshire =

Village in Pembrokeshire, Wales

Coordinates: 51.730078°N 4.686164°W

Pleasant Valley
- Village
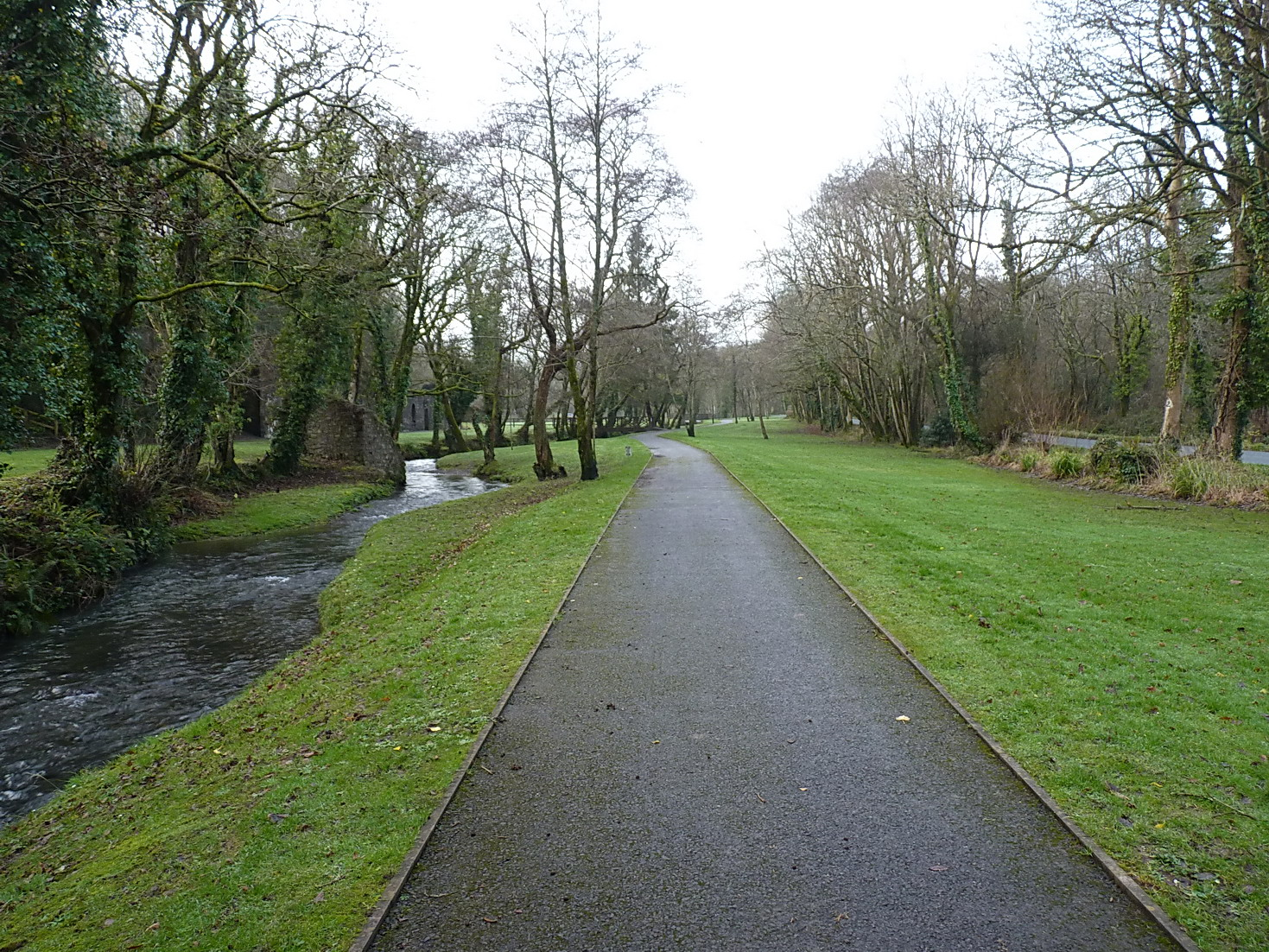
- Footpath through Pleasant Valley

- Location within Pembrokeshire
- Principal area: Pembrokeshire
- Country: Wales
- Sovereign state: United Kingdom
- Police: Dyfed-Powys
- Fire: Mid and West Wales
- Ambulance: Welsh
- UK Parliament: Mid and South Pembrokeshire
- Senedd Cymru – Welsh Parliament: Ceredigion Penfro

Pleasant Valley is a village in the community of Amroth, Pembrokeshire, Wales, partly in the Pembrokeshire Coast National Park. The nearest railway station is at Kilgetty, about 5 miles away, and the nearest town is Saundersfoot to the southwest.

== Geography ==
The east side of the valley (formerly marked as Cwmrath - valley of the River Rath - that flows down to Wiseman's Bridge) features a linear development of dwellings. It is partly in the Pembrokeshire Coast National Park.

== Amenities ==
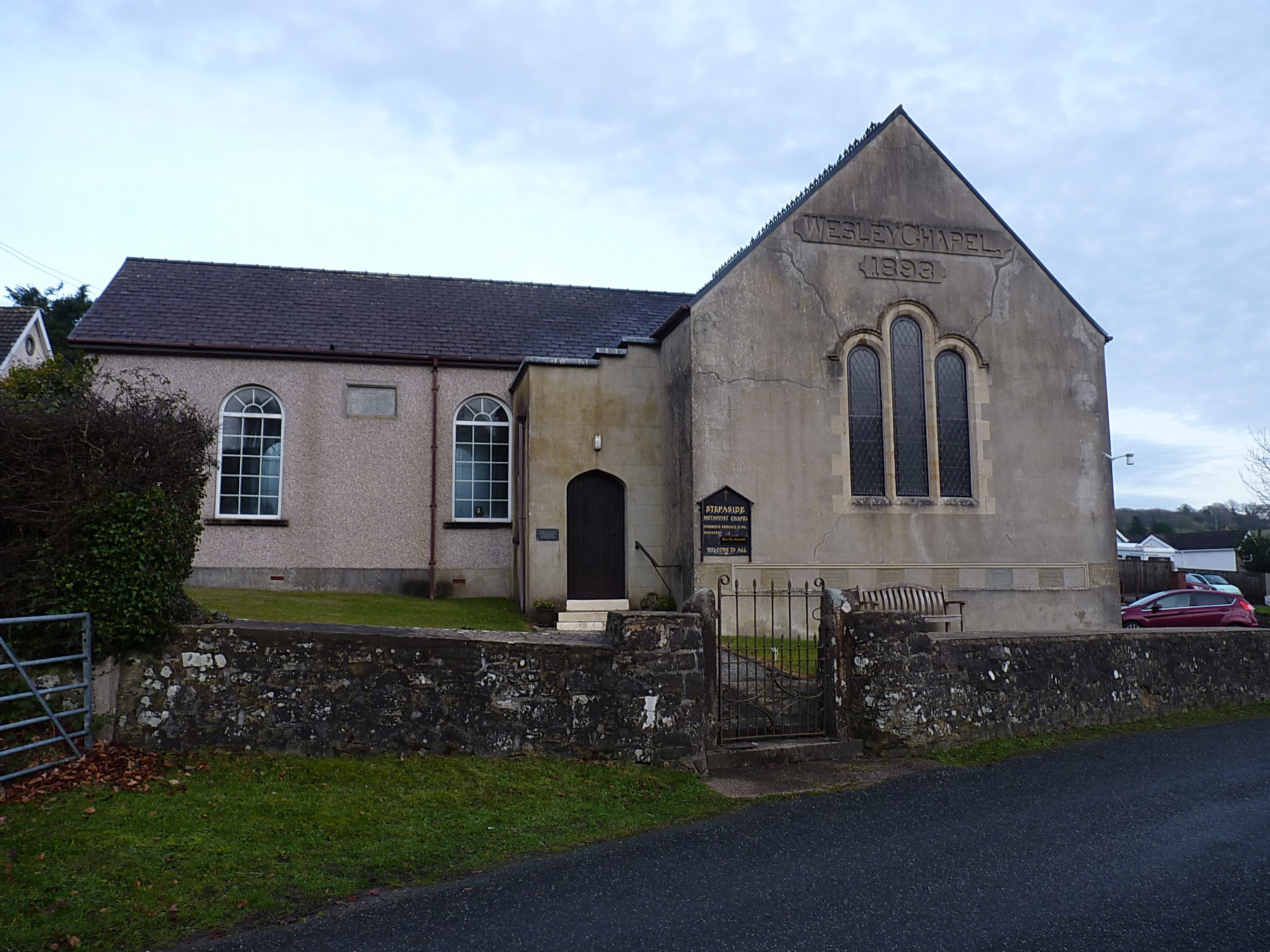
Methodist Chapel

Pleasant Valley Caravan Park is in the village, and Stepaside Wesleyan Methodist Chapel is at the north end. The chapel was built in 1861 and extended in 1893.

== Governance ==
Pleasant Valley is in the Mid and South Pembrokeshire constituency, which has been represented by Henry Tufnell from the Labour Party since 2024.
