= Kilgetty/Begelly =

Community in Pembrokeshire, Wales

- Community
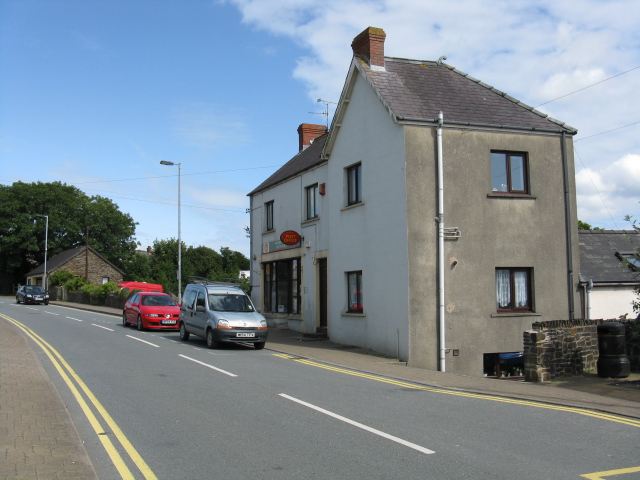
- Kilgetty Post Office
- Interactive map of Kilgetty/Begelly
- Coordinates: 51.743666°N 4.7422743°W
- Country: Wales
- Principal area: Pembrokeshire
- Status: Community
- Settlements: Begelly, Broom, Kilgetty, Reynalton, Shipping and Thomas Chapel

Area
  - Total: 19.6 km^{2} (7.6 sq mi)

Population (2011)
  - Total: 2,262
  - Density: 115/km^{2} (299/sq mi)
- Website: https://www.pembstcc.co.uk/kilgetty-and-begelly-community-council
- Map of the community

Kilgetty/Begelly is a community in southeast Pembrokeshire, Wales. It includes the settlements of Begelly, Broom, Kilgetty, Reynalton, Shipping and Thomas Chapel. The community touches Amroth, East Williamston, Jeffreyston, Lampeter Velfrey, Saundersfoot and Templeton. It has a community council and community association.

== Landmarks ==
There are 18 listed structures in Kilgetty/Begelly, all Grade II apart from the parish church of St Mary in Begelly, which is Grade II*.

== Population ==
In 2011 the community and ward had a population of 2262.

== Governance ==
The community has a community council, whose meetings are open to the public, and whose responsibilities include provision of local services and such public amenities as play areas, fencing, public waste bins and paths. They may also be involved in deciding planning applications. Minutes of meetings are published on their website, which also states that: "All Councillors are Independent and are not affiliated to any political Party".

The community is also coterminous with an electoral ward to Pembrokeshire County Council, called 'Kilgetty and Begelly', electing one county councillor. At the Pembrokeshire County Council election in May 2022, the ward elected Liberal Democrat councillor, Alistair Cameron.

== Community Association ==
The community has a Community Association, one of whose voluntary responsibilities is to maintain community gardens; the Association meets every two months. For community-wide events, Kilgetty Community Centre has two meeting rooms and a fully-equipped kitchen.
