= Carmarthen Bay =

Inlet on the South Coast of Wales

Coordinates: 51°40′N 4°30′W

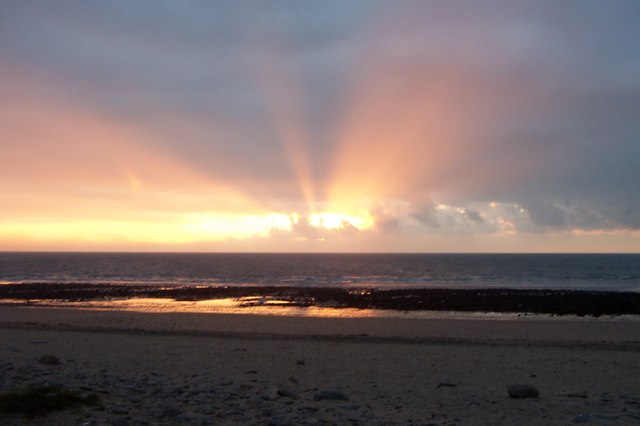
Sunrise, Carmarthen Bay

Carmarthen Bay (Welsh: Bae Caerfyrddin) is an inlet of the South Wales coast, including notable beaches such as Pendine Sands and Cefn Sidan sands. Carmarthen Bay is partially within the Pembrokeshire Coast National Park. The Joint Nature Conservation Committee list Carmarthen Bay and Estuaries as a Special Area of Conservation.

== Geography ==
The River Loughor flows into the bay at the Burry estuary, and the rivers Tywi, Taf and Gwendraeth flow into the bay at the Three Rivers Estuary. Caldey Island lies in the bay near Tenby Harbour. The northwestern corner of the bay is separately named as Saundersfoot Bay. Towns and villages in the bay include, from east to west: Llanelli, Burry Port (Porth Tywyn), Pembrey (Penbre), Kidwelly (Cydweli), Ferryside (Glanyfferi), Llansteffan, Laugharne (Talacharn), Pendine (Pentywyn), Amroth, Wisemans Bridge (Pont-yr-ŵrddoeth), Saundersfoot and Tenby (Dinbych y Pysgod). There are fine beaches at Pendine Sands, Cefn Sidan, Laugharne, Llansteffan and Ferryside.

== Biodiversity ==
The Joint Nature Conservation Committee list Carmarthen Bay and Estuaries as a Special Area of Conservation. This is a public body that advises the Welsh Government on international nature conservation. The area conserved includes sea inlets, tidal rivers, estuaries, mud flats, sand flats, lagoons (including saltwork basins), salt marshes, salt pastures, salt steppes, shingle, sea cliffs and islets. The sand and mud flats have large numbers of bivalve molluscs including the edible cockle. The large shallow inlets and bays provide habitat for a great variety of marine invertebrates. The saltmarshes have biodiverse communities of glasswort (Salicornis species), dwarf eelgrass (Zostera noltei), sea rush (Juncus maritimus) and marsh-mallow (Althaea officinalis) and all the wildlife they support. A primary reason for the listing is the presence in the bay of the twait shad (Alosa fallax), a migratory fish.

== Wind turbine testing in the 1980s ==
An area of the Carmarthen Bay coastline near Burry Port was used in the 1980s to test wind turbines. The first turbine to be installed in the area was switched on in November 1982. Five turbines of different designs were tested at the site, installed between 1982 and 1989. The project was concluded in the late 1990s, the turbines were removed, and the land was eventually integrated into the Millennium Coastal Park.
