= Begelly =

Village and parish in Pembrokeshire, Wales

Begelly: Welsh: Begeli
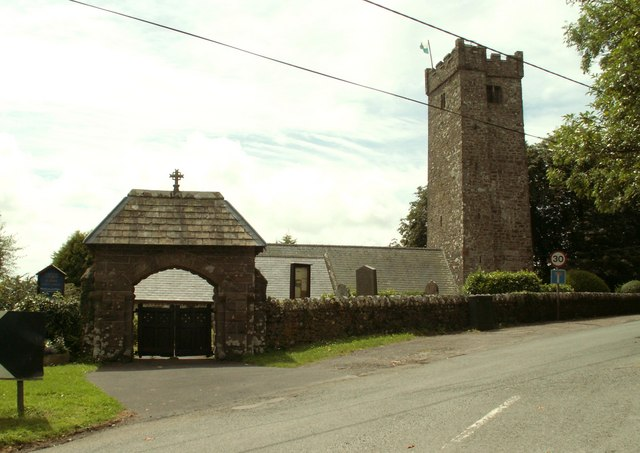
- Parish church of St Mary

- Location within Pembrokeshire
- Population: 761
- OS grid reference: SN118073
- Community: Kilgetty/Begelly
- Principal area: Pembrokeshire
- Country: Wales
- Sovereign state: United Kingdom
- Police: Dyfed-Powys
- Fire: Mid and West Wales
- Ambulance: Welsh

Begelly (Welsh: Begeli) is a village and parish in south Pembrokeshire, Wales, 4.3 miles (6.9 km) north of Tenby on the A478 road. The parish includes the hamlets of Thomas Chapel 51°44′36″N 4°44′42″W and Broom and has a web of small settlements associated with the 19th century anthracite mining industry. The parish, together with the parish of Reynalton and part (Kilgetty) of St. Issells, constitutes the community and ward of Kilgetty/Begelly. Begelly had a population of 761 in 2011.

== Name ==
The placename appears to be Welsh, meaning "Bugail's territory".

== History ==
Part of Little England beyond Wales, it has been essentially English-speaking for 900 years. The parish, recorded on a 1578 map as Begely, had an area of 2,520 acres (1,020 ha) (3.94 square miles). Its census populations were: 354 (1801): 779 (1851): 445 (1901): 346 (1951): 500 (1981).

The percentage of Welsh speakers was 3.5 (1891): 5.0 (1931): 4.5 (1971).
