= Summerhill, Pembrokeshire =

Village in Pembrokeshire, Wales

Coordinates: 51.73476°N 4.67766°W

Summerhill
- Location within Pembrokeshire
- OS grid reference: SN152074
- Principal area: Pembrokeshire
- Preserved county: Dyfed
- Country: Wales
- Sovereign state: United Kingdom
- Post town: NARBERTH
- Postcode district: SA
- Dialling code: 01834

Summerhill is a small settlement 1 mile (1.6 km) northwest of Amroth, in Pembrokeshire, Wales, in Amroth parish and community.

== History ==
Summerhill was originally where farmers would graze their sheep in the summer, hence the name, but now it is a village of several houses and a corner shop. It is not marked on a pre-1850 map of Amroth parish. A Primitive Methodist chapel was established in 1879; chapel records, including baptisms, Sunday school papers and minutes are held by Pembrokeshire Records Office. By the 1990s the chapel had been converted to a residential property.

== Governance ==
Summerhill comes under the governance of Amroth Community Council.

== Amenities ==
Amroth Parish Hall is in Summerhill. With a capacity of 120, it hosts regular classes and meetings. The present building was constructed in 2008 to replace an earlier 1951 building.
