= Kilgetty railway station =

Railway station in Pembrokeshire, Wales

Kilgetty Welsh: Cilgeti
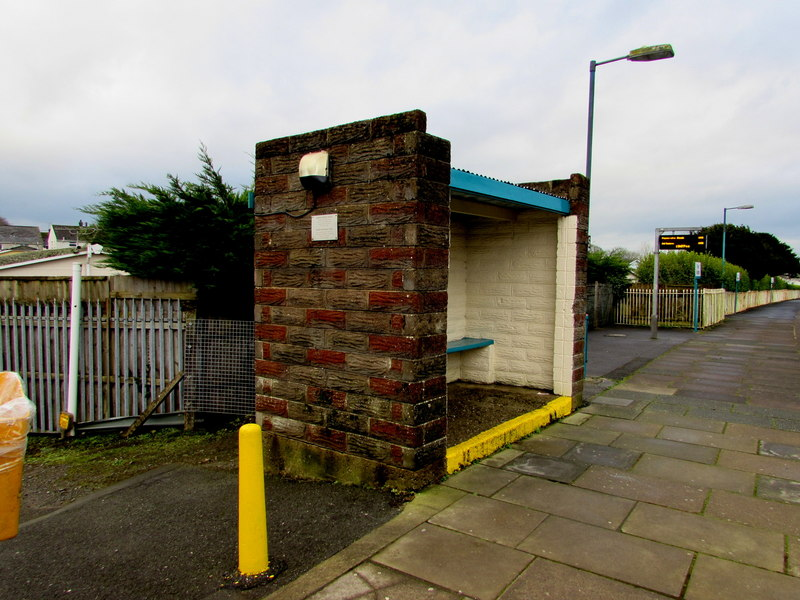

General information
- Location: Kilgetty, Pembrokeshire; Wales
- Coordinates: 51.732°N 4.715°W
- Grid reference: SN126072
- Manager: Transport for Wales
- Platforms: 1

Other information
- Station code: KGT
- Classification: DfT category F2

Passengers
- 2021/22: ▲8,372
- 2022/23: ▲12,352
- 2023/24: ▲14,280
- 2024/25: ▲17,452
- 2025/26: ▲17,894
Location
Notes
- Passenger statistics from the Office of Rail and Road

Kilgetty railway station serves Kilgetty in Pembrokeshire, Wales.

The station is a request stop so passengers wishing to alight should make their intentions known to the on-board train staff at the start of their journey, while passengers wishing to board should make a clear signal to the driver as the train approaches.

The station is 1.3 miles from Folly Farm Adventure Park and Zoo.

== Services ==
Services at Kilgetty are provided by Transport for Wales which run at approximately 2-hour intervals in both directions. Great Western Railway also run a Summer Saturday only service that calls once a day.

Preceding station	National Rail	Following station
Narberth	Transport for Wales; Pembroke Dock branch	Saundersfoot
Narberth	Great Western Railway; London - Pembroke + (Once a Day "Summer Saturdays' ONLY")	Saundersfoot
