= Pembrokeshire Coalfield =

Coordinates: 51°42′N 4°42′W

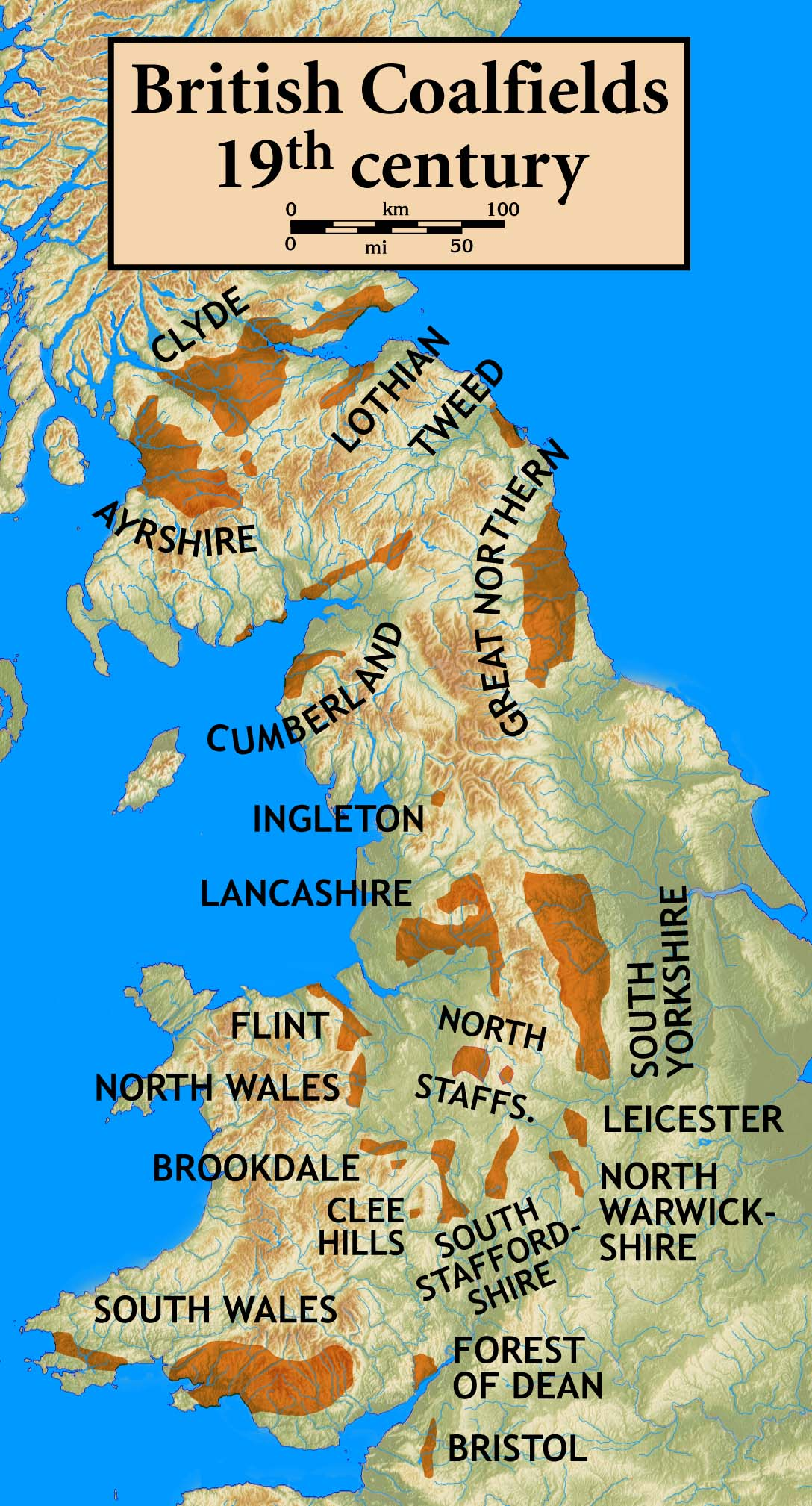
Map of British Coalfields

The Pembrokeshire Coalfield in West Wales is one of the smallest British coalfields, but continuously worked from the 14th to 20th centuries. The main coalfield extends across south Pembrokeshire from Saundersfoot on Carmarthen Bay westwards to Broad Haven on St Brides Bay. A small detached portion of the field is centred on Newgale on St Brides Bay.

The coalfield is the westernmost extension of the South Wales Coalfield though Carmarthen Bay geographically separates the two areas.

== History ==
Coal mining in Pembrokeshire dates back at least to the early 14th century. The coal was used locally or exported by sea from local ports. It was generally high-quality anthracite, but seams were mostly thin, with the best coal only available at some depth. In 1603 George Owen of Henllys described a typical colliery as employing 16 people working from 6 am to 6 pm. In the 1700s collieries were employing men, women and boys for a few pence a day, rising to a shilling (for men) by 1806. By the 19th century coal mining had become an important local industry with many farmers operating mines or carting as a supplement to their income. By 1865 the coalfield was employing nearly 1,000 people. Decline began in the 19th century, with many collieries closing after 1900, but others retained a strong link between mining and agriculture. Some collieries continued into the 20th century until the industry was nationalised in 1947 when the last colliery at Kilgetty closed.

== Seams ==
Coal seams within the Pembrokeshire Coalfield are traditionally referred to as veins. The following sequence is recognised in the west of the district:

- Rickets Head Vein
- Black Cliff Vein
- Cliff Vein
- Hookes Vein
- Folly Vein
- Folkeston Vein
- Haggard Vein
- Stonepit Vein
- Quarry Vein
- Yard Vein
- Stink Vein
- Five Feet Vein
- Three Quarter Vein
- Brawdy Veins

The Stonepit and Quarry Veins are collectively referred to as the Sibbernock Veins. The sequence from the Three Quarter to the Foot Vein constitutes the Newgale, Simpson and Eweston Coals.

In contrast in the centre and east of the district, there are fewer veins in what is a more compressed sequence:

- Rock Vein
- Timber Vein
- Lower Level Vein
- Kilgetty Vein
- Tan Pits Vein

== See also ==
- Coal in the United Kingdom
- History of coal mining in Great Britain
