= William Frost =

William Frost (28 May 1848 – March 1935) was a Welsh designer of an early flying machine, the Frost Airship Glider.

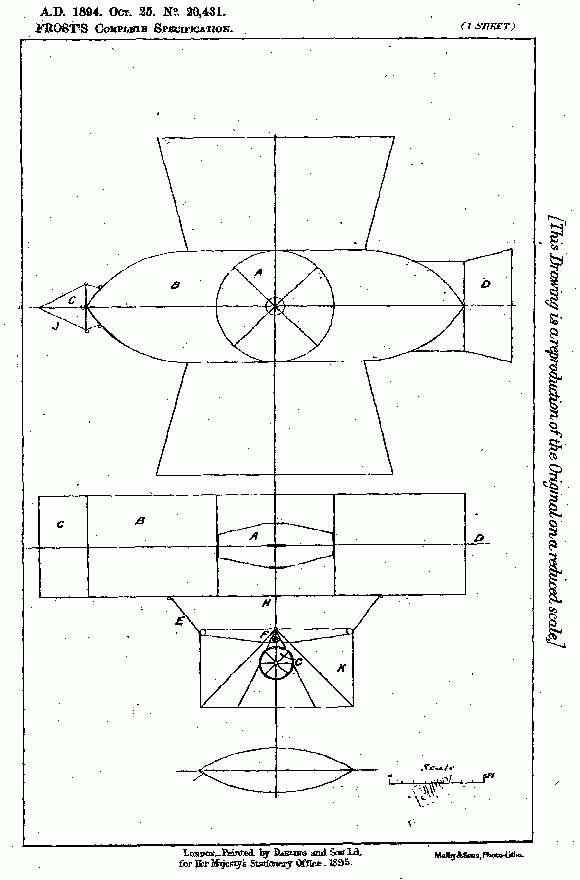
Patent drawing for the Frost flying machine

== Biography ==
William Frost was born on 28 May 1848 in Saundersfoot, Pembrokeshire, to Rebecca and John Frost.

His ambition to invent a flying machine started about 1880. Despite his poverty he constructed the "Frost Airship Glider", which seems, in principle, to have resembled a vertical takeoff airplane, with gas-filled tanks. From the patent description:

The flying machine is propelled into the air by two reversible fans revolving horizontally. When sufficient height is gained, wings are spread and tilted by means of a lever, causing the machine to float onward and downward. When low enough the lever is reversed causing it to rise upward & onward. When required to stop it the wings are tilted so as to hold against the wind or air and lowered by the reversible fans. The steering is done by a helm fitted to front of machine.

The next paragraph says, "The steering is done by a rudder at both ends."

The Edinburgh Evening News, reporting on the machine in October 1895, reported: "the inventor confidently predicts that it will travel at the rate of 100 miles an hour".

Writer Byron Rogers, apparently relying on the book A Pembrokeshire Pioneer by Roscoe Howells, gave a description of the flying machine as "part balloon (gas cylinders gave it lift), part powered hang glider, foot-pedals operating helicopter-style blades".

Frost reportedly made a flight at Saundersfoot on or about 24 September 1896 for a distance of about 500 metres, then crashed into bushes (by comparison, the first powered flight of the Wright brothers traveled 120 feet in 12 seconds). During the night following the flight, a violent storm destroyed and scattered the flying machine.

The event was not recorded except in local memories. Although a poor working man, Frost applied for a patent which was accepted and registered in London on 25 October 1894 under number 1894-20431. Unable to pay renewal fees, he allowed the patent to lapse four years later. He gave up on the idea of flying, and ripped up all but one sheet about the Frost Flying Machine. He died without wealth or recognition in 1935.

== Bibliography ==
- Roscoe Howells (2007). A Pembrokeshire Pioneer. Gwalch. ISBN 978-1-84524-084-4.
