= Saint Issel =

St Issel
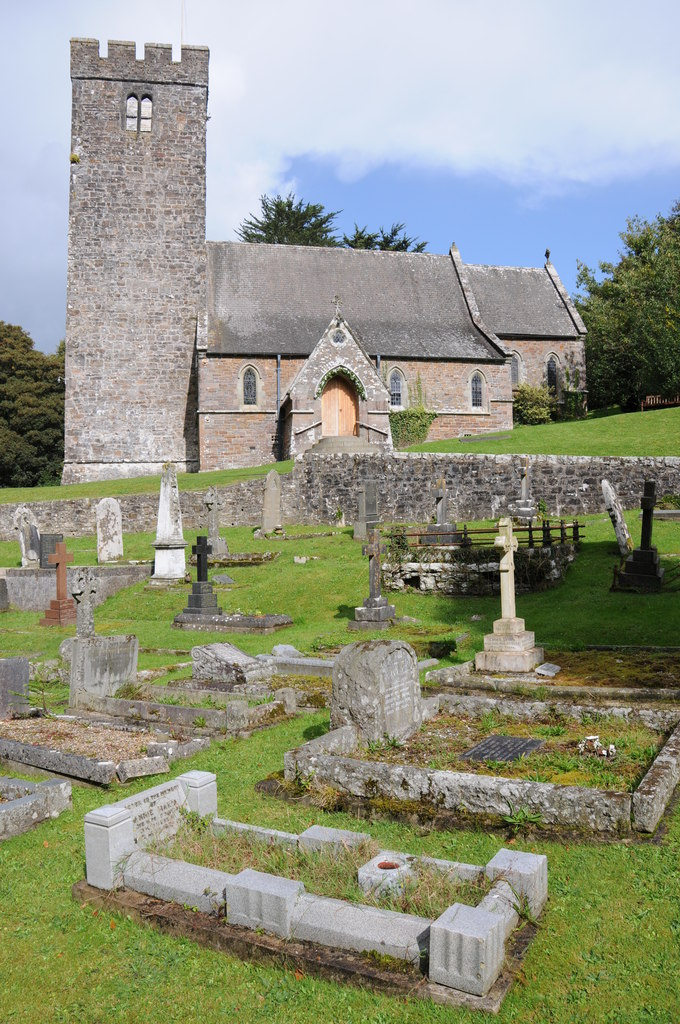
- St Issell's church, Saundersfoot
- Born: c. 6th Century AD; Kingdom of Dyfed
- Venerated in: (Wales) Celtic Christianity Orthodox Christianity
- Tradition or genre: Celtic Rite

Saint Issel or Issell (Welsh: Eussyllt or Usyllt) was a 6th-century Welsh saint in Celtic Christianity. He lived in the Kingdom of Dyfed and is principally notable as being the father of Saint Teilo.

His name appears in many forms in surviving texts, but seems to have been derived from the Latin name Auxilius.

The Book of Llandaff gives his wife as Guenhaf daughter of Liuonui. He was the father of Saint Teilo and the Anauved who married King Budig of Armorica and bore three saints. The oldest genealogies present him as also the father of Saint Cynllo.

He is the patron saint of the parish church at Saundersfoot (Old Welsh: Llanussyllt) but probably not the patron of Haroldston St Issells which was probably corrupted from an original dedication to his grandson Saint Ismael.
