= Sea rush =

Sea rush is a common name for several rushes in the genus Juncus and may refer to:

- Juncus kraussii, native to the Southern hemisphere
- Juncus maritimus, native to the Northern hemisphere
