= Frost Airship Glider =

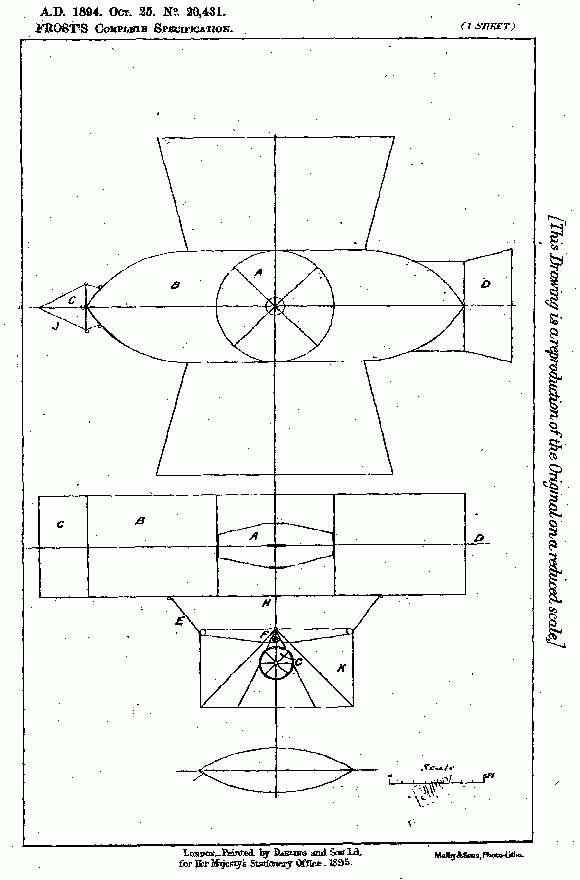
Patent drawing for the Frost flying machine

The Frost Airship Glider was an aircraft designed and constructed in Wales during the mid-1890s by William (Bill) Frost. According to patent specification 1894-20431, issued in London, the craft was simply called "A Flying Machine".

The preamble to the specification states:

The flying machine is constructed with an upper and lower chamber of wire work covered with light waterproof material. Each chamber formed sharp at both ends with parallel side. The upper large chamber to contain sufficient gas to lift the machine. In the centre of upper chamber, a cylinder is fixed, in which a horizontal fan is driven by means of a shaft and bevelled gearing worked from the lower chamber.

According to local lore, Frost flew this machine for the only time on 24 September 1896, for approximately 500 metres, before coming down and crashing into bushes. A storm that night destroyed the craft and scattered the remains.
