= Reynalton =

Village and parish in Pembrokeshire, Wales

Coordinates: 51.75°N 4.77°W

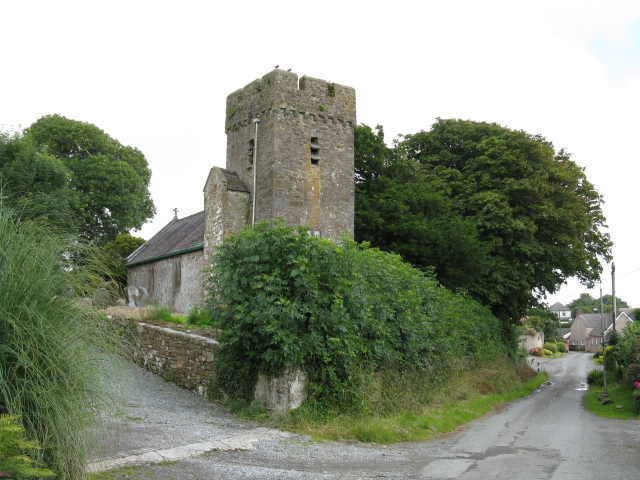
- Church of St James, Reynalton

- Location within Pembrokeshire
- OS grid reference: SN090094
- Community: Kilgetty/Begelly
- Principal area: Pembrokeshire
- Country: Wales
- Sovereign state: United Kingdom
- Police: Dyfed-Powys
- Fire: Mid and West Wales
- Ambulance: Welsh

Reynalton is a small village and parish in Pembrokeshire, Wales, near Tenby and Kilgetty, and is in Kilgetty/Begelly community.

== History ==
=== Parish ===
The parish is small, just 525 acres (212 ha), and rural. There were 109 inhabitants in the 1830s. The population in 1870 was 106, in 24 houses. In 1961, the population was 69. The parish subsequently came under the Church in Wales parish of Narberth and Tenby.

Coal was mined in the parish in the early 20th century and in 1915 the Saundersfoot Railway was extended to Reynalton. Reynalton Colliery closed in 1921.

=== Parish church ===
The parish church of St James was described by Samuel Lewis in 1833 as "a small ancient edifice, with a low tower, and in a very dilapidated condition". It has mediaeval origins and retains its original tower; the building was restored in the 19th century and is now a Grade II listed building.

=== Internet access ===
In December 2008, Reynalton was one of six broadband "not-spots" in Wales – communities without high-speed Internet access; the Welsh Assembly Government in conjunction with BT confirmed that coverage in these areas would soon be upgraded to bring them into line with the rest of the UK. In 2010, Reynalton became broadband enabled.
