= Dwarf eelgrass =

Dwarf eelgrass is a common name for several plants and may refer to:

- Zostera japonica, native to the western Pacific Ocean and naturalized in the eastern Pacific
- Zostera noltei, native to the eastern Atlantic Ocean
