= Wisemans Bridge =

Coastal hamlet in Pembrokeshire, Wales

Coordinates: 51.724°N 4.685°W

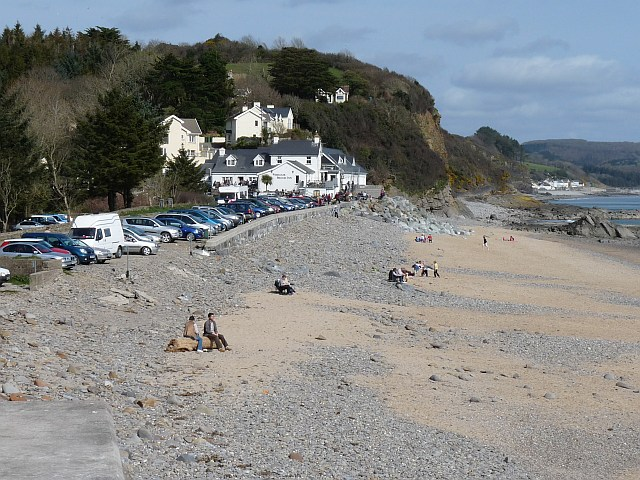
- The seafront at Wisemans Bridge

- Location within Pembrokeshire
- OS grid reference: SN144062
- Community: Amroth
- Principal area: Pembrokeshire
- Country: Wales
- Sovereign state: United Kingdom
- Police: Dyfed-Powys
- Fire: Mid and West Wales
- Ambulance: Welsh

Wisemans Bridge is a coastal hamlet between Amroth and Saundersfoot in Pembrokeshire, Wales. The small beachfront settlement, which is part of the parish and community of Amroth, was once an important centre for the mineral industry in West Wales. It is now a popular holiday destination within Carmarthen Bay.

== Toponym ==
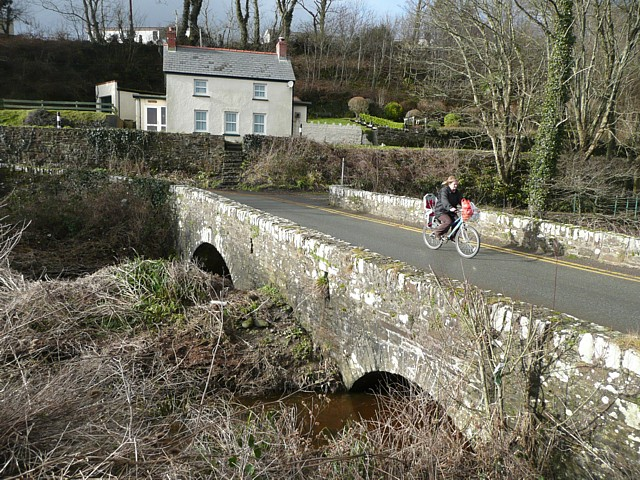
The bridge at Wisemans Bridge

The name Wisemans Bridge has no definitive origin. In early medieval Wales, the area was part of Llanussyllt but after the Norman conquest it became known as the Parish of St Issells in dedication to the Welsh saint Issel. In 1598, a local entry in the parish records of St Issells mentions a bridge in the locale. This has led to the theory that the name Wisemans Bridge derives directly from the decision to use the crossing rather than take another route. However, research of St Issells' parish records in the 14th century show that an Andrew Wiseman held lands thereabouts as early as 1324. It was recorded by the Ordnance Survey as Wisemans Bridge between 1898 and 1908.

The Welsh form Pont-yr-ŵr has been used on-line in a small number of instances. But the form is not noted in the standard work on Pembrokeshire place names and is of unknown origin.

== History ==
The valley behind Wisemans Bridge between the 14th and 19th centuries was a centre of industrial activity within the Pembrokeshire Coalfields. By the 19th century, the local high-quality coal was shipped out of Wisemans Bridge in 50- or 60-ton vessels. A 4-foot narrow-gauge railway also transported coal to Saundersfoot Harbour via Coppet Hall. The line was permanently closed in 1939. The old railway through Wisemans Bridge and its tunnels to Saundersfoot are now part of the Pembrokeshire Coast Path, a designated National Trail that was established in 1970.

In 1943, Winston Churchill visited the area as the allies practised for the D Day landings.
