= Kilgetty =

Village in Pembrokeshire, Wales

Coordinates: 51.73205°N 4.718113°W

Kilgetty: Welsh: Cilgeti
- Location within Pembrokeshire
- Population: 1,207
- Community: Kilgetty/Begelly
- Principal area: Pembrokeshire
- Preserved county: Dyfed
- Country: Wales
- Sovereign state: United Kingdom
- Post town: KILGETTY
- Postcode district: SA68
- Dialling code: 01834
- Police: Dyfed-Powys
- Fire: Mid and West Wales
- Ambulance: Welsh
- UK Parliament: Mid and South Pembrokeshire
- Senedd Cymru – Welsh Parliament: Carmarthen West and South Pembrokeshire

Kilgetty (Welsh: Cilgeti; Welsh pronunciation) is a village immediately north of Saundersfoot in Pembrokeshire, Wales, at the junction of the A477 between St. Clears and Pembroke Dock and the A478 between Tenby and Cardigan.

== Community ==
The villages of Kilgetty, Reynalton and Begelly make up the community of Kilgetty/Begelly. In 2011 it had a population of 1,207.

== History ==
Kilgetty, in Narberth Hundred and the parish of St Issel's, was the name of an ancient mansion owned by the Picton family and was already decaying in the 19th century, according to Lewis's Topographical Dictionary of Wales published in 1833. It was subsequently. demolished. The remnants of the garden are designated Grade II on the Cadw/ICOMOS Register of Parks and Gardens of Special Historic Interest in Wales.

=== Coal mining ===
Kilgetty has an industrial heritage and was part of the Pembrokeshire anthracite coalfield. Coal had been mined locally since the middle ages and was easily accessible as the coal seams were comparatively close to the surface. While much larger colliery settlements emerged further east in the nineteenth century the coal industry in Pembrokeshire also expanded. During the 1870s the miners of the locality became involved with the Amalgamated Association of Miners and in 1874 trade union leader Thomas Halliday addressed the miners of the locality on Begelly Common.

The last Pembrokeshire coal mine, at Kilgetty, closed in 1950.

== Amenities ==
The village has local shopping facilities, a pub, which was called the Railway Inn, now the White Horse, and a sports club that has a cricket and football ground. There is a local scout group known as 1st Kilgetty. St Mary's Mission Church in the village closed for worship in the 1990s and is now a private residence. Kilgetty railway station is a request stop on the West Wales Line.

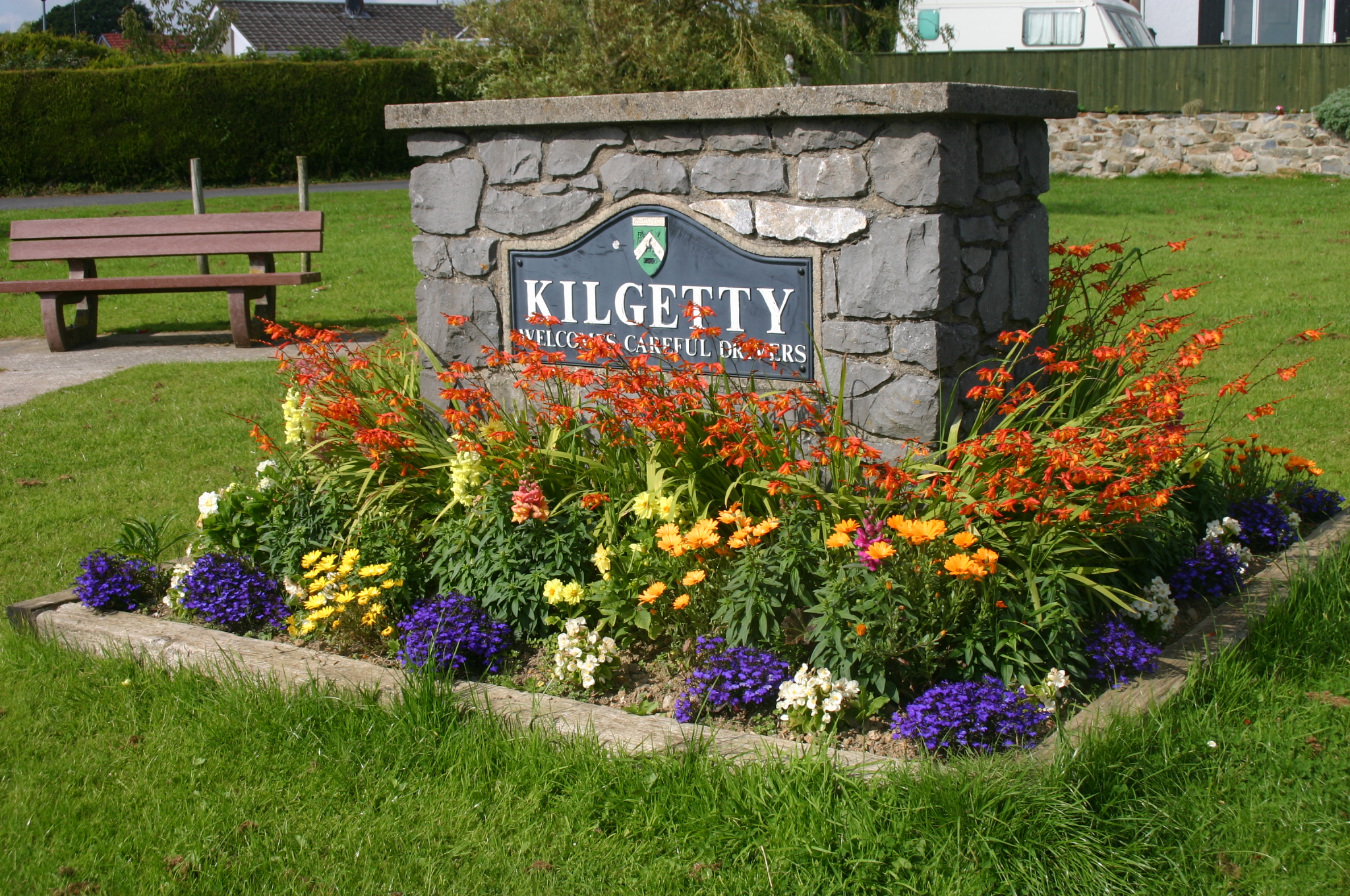
Kilgetty
