= Llanteg =

Village in Pembrokeshire, Wales

Coordinates: 51.761446°N 04.636811°W

Llanteg: Welsh: Llanteg
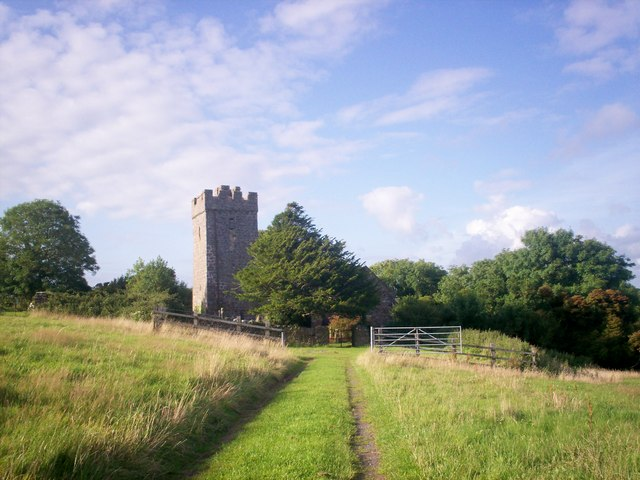

- Location within Pembrokeshire
- OS grid reference: SN181102
- Principal area: Pembrokeshire
- Preserved county: Dyfed
- Country: Wales
- Sovereign state: United Kingdom
- Post town: NARBERTH
- Postcode district: SA67
- Dialling code: 01834
- Police: Dyfed-Powys
- Fire: Mid and West Wales
- Ambulance: Welsh
- UK Parliament: Mid and South Pembrokeshire
- Senedd Cymru – Welsh Parliament: Carmarthen West and South Pembrokeshire (Senedd constituency)

Llanteg (also previously known, and still regularly pronounced, as Lanteague) is a small village in Pembrokeshire, Wales, belonging to the community of Amroth.

It contains a 13th-century church (St Elidyrs) and two closed chapels.

== History ==
=== The parish ===
Cronwere (Crunwear), a parish, in the union and hundred of Narberth, county of Pembroke, South Wales, 5 miles (8.0 km) east south-east from Narberth; containing 282 inhabitants. This parish is situated on the eastern confines of the county, a short distance south of the turnpike-road from Laugharne to Narberth. It is bounded on the north by Lampeter, on the south by Amroth, on the west by Ludchurch, and on the east by Carmarthenshire, from which it is separated by a small brook. The number of acres is about 2000, of which 1500 are arable, and 500 pasture. The surface is of a hilly character: the soil is various; red earth, affording rich pasture, extends across a portion of the parish in a direction from north to south; other parts are cold and sterile, with a subsoil of clay; the earth covering the limestone portion is good, but liable to become soon parched and dry. There is a village named Lanteague, the only one in the parish; also a corn-mill, and a mill where the coarse cloth of the country is prepared and dyed: a quarry is likewise worked, producing limestone of fine quality. The living is a discharged rectory, rated in the king's books at £6. 16. 10½., and in the patronage of the Lord Chancellor: the tithes have been commuted for a rent-charge of £105; there is a glebe-house, and the glebe contains sixty-eight acres, valued at £50 per annum. The church, dedicated to St. Elidyr, is a very ancient structure, now nearly in ruins, and contains 200 sittings. A Sunday school was established in the year 1820.

=== Llanteg War Memorial ===
As there was no memorial in the village to commemorate the War Dead the village history group commissioned one in 2003.

This war memorial was commissioned by the History Society in 2003 and designed and worked for free by Mrs Diana John of Ruelwall, being unveiled in February 2004. There is a War Memorial and brass plaque in Llanteg Hall to commemorate the three War Dead from Crunwere Parish. There is a Brass Plaque to commemorate Diana John of Ruelwall who designed and worked the memorial free for the History Society.

The War Memorial was unveiled by Mrs Eileen Oriel (widow of Mr J.E.J.Mason) after a dedication by Rev'd Bate in February 2004.

=== Places of worship ===
All Crunwere's places of worship are now closed - Zoar Chapel is now a Chapel of Rest, Mountain Chapel has been demolished and made into a garden of remembrance and Crunwere Church (St Elidyrs) has been declared redundant and the last open air service was held there in August 2009.

== Amenities ==
Llanteg Service Station lies along the A477 within the village and provides the only shop. Adjacent to the petrol station is Edgey's Garage which provides servicing and vehicle repairs. Previously Crofty Nurseries, Tenby Tourers is opposite the Mountain Chapel site along the A477. Byron's Cafe is also on the same site as Tenby Tourers. Further along the A477, Greenacre Market Garden sells seasonal vegetables. Llanteglos Estate has a series of holiday lodges within the village. The Wanderer's Rest pub is within the site of Llanteglos Estate, but is now closed. Also on the Estate is the Oriel Llanteglos Gallery opened in summer 2020 which showcases the work of Welsh artists. Planning permission is being applied for an eco-tourism visitor attraction (Butterfly Haven) in Llanteg to feature moths, butterfly, birds and insects with biomes for European, South American, South East Asian and African species.
