= Amroth =

Village, parish and community in Pembrokeshire, Wales

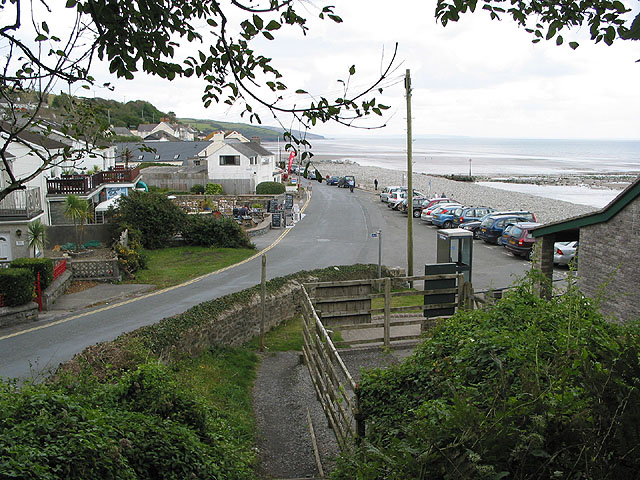
- Amroth village and beach

- Location within Pembrokeshire
- Population: 1,232 (2011)
- OS grid reference: SN1607
- Community: Amroth
- Principal area: Pembrokeshire
- Country: Wales
- Sovereign state: United Kingdom
- Post town: NARBERTH
- Postcode district: SA67
- Dialling code: 01834
- Police: Dyfed-Powys
- Fire: Mid and West Wales
- Ambulance: Welsh
- List of places UK Wales Pembrokeshire 51.73°N 04.66°W Map of the community

Amroth is a village, parish and community 7 miles (11 km) northeast of Tenby, Pembrokeshire, Wales. Located on Carmarthen Bay, Amroth is noted for its long sandy beach which stretches the length of the village. It regularly earns a Blue Flag award. and is the south-to-north start of the Pembrokeshire Coast Path. Amroth is within the Pembrokeshire Coast National Park.

The name is Welsh, and probably means "on (the brook called) Rhath".

== History ==
The beach stretches the whole length of the village and at extreme low tide, the petrified forest, destroyed when sea levels rose 7,000 years ago, can still be seen. Fossilised antlers, nuts and animal bones and Neolithic flints have been discovered.

The parish, which appeared as Amrath on a 1578 parish map of Pembrokeshire, was an important anthracite coal mining area until the end of the 19th century. Slight remains of mines and tramways are still visible. Ruins of Amroth Castle still remain, and one mile inland is the Anglican parish church of St Elidyr, which is a grade II* listed building.

== Amroth Castle ==
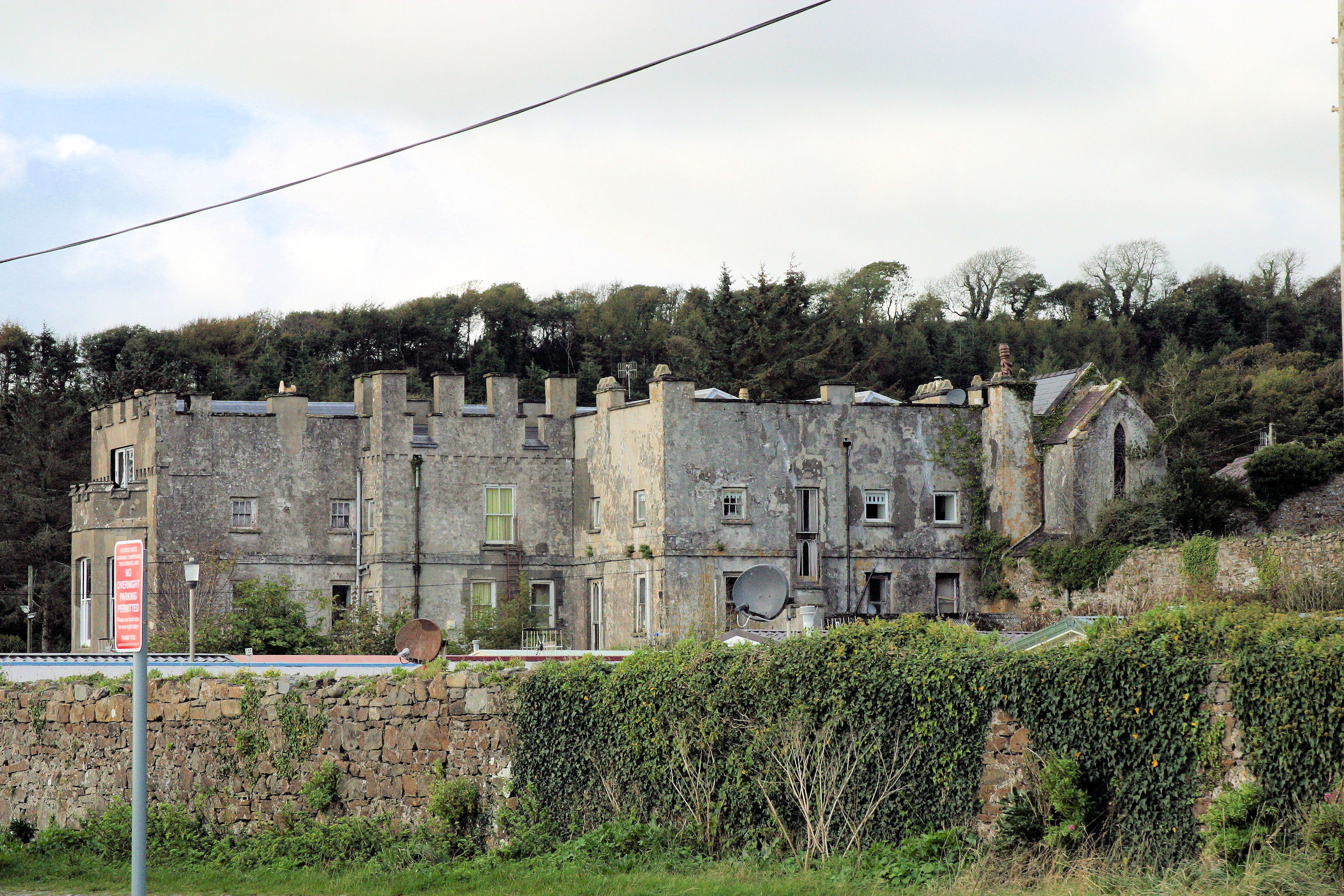
Amroth Castle

Amroth Castle stands on the north side of the unclassified coast road east of the village of Amroth. It is surrounded by a high wall with an entrance archway at the south-western corner. The present building is a 19th-century country house built in the style of a mock castle which possibly replaced a small stone castle dating from the 12th century. The gatehouse is much restored. The ruinous remains of the house are a grade I listed building.

After passing through several hands the castle was used as a lunatic asylum in the 1850s. Converted back to a private house in the 1880s it was later owned and occupied by Owen Colby Philipps, the shipping magnate who bought the White Star Line and was created Baron Kylsant of Carmarthen and Amroth in 1923. It passed to his daughter Nesta, who had married George Coventry, grandson of the 9th Earl of Coventry. They moved out in 1930 when George inherited the Coventry title and estates.

== Walking trails ==
The Pembrokeshire Coast Path runs west along the coast from its start at Amroth. This national trail has since 2012 also formed a part of the Wales Coast Path which continues eastwards from Amroth over the headland of Telpyn Point towards Pendine. Amroth is also the southern terminus of the Knights' Way, which runs north to St Davids Cathedral. A section of the Cistercian Way also passes through.

== Governance ==
Amroth is an electoral ward and a community in Pembrokeshire, which includes Amroth, Crunwere, Summerhill, Stepaside, Pleasant Valley, Wisemans Bridge, Llanteg and Llanteglos. The ward elects a councillor to Pembrokeshire County Council and up to twelve community councillors to Amroth Community Council.

== Amenities ==
The beach which stretches the length of the village earned a Blue Flag award in 2020 and the eastern end has had a lifeguard for part of the summer. Public toilets are available at either ends of the village. The main car park is managed by Pembrokeshire Coast National Park Authority.

== See also ==
- Colby Woodland Garden
