= Stepaside, Pembrokeshire =

Village in Pembrokeshire, Wales

Coordinates: 51.73703°N 4.69662°W

Stepaside
- Location within Pembrokeshire
- Population: 619
- OS grid reference: SN139077
- Community: Amroth
- Principal area: Pembrokeshire
- Preserved county: Dyfed
- Country: Wales
- Sovereign state: United Kingdom

Stepaside is a village six miles north of Tenby, Pembrokeshire, in the community and parish of Amroth. The population in the 2011 census was 619. Once home to both coal and iron mines, it is now a holiday hamlet with a few houses and caravan parks. The Stepaside Heritage Park is situated on the road between it and Wisemans Bridge. Nearby towns and villages include Kilgetty and Amroth.

Information signs at Stepaside state that Stepaside got its name when Oliver Cromwell and his army passed through on their way to Pembroke. Cromwell is reported to have asked people in his way to step aside.

The Old Dramway runs from Stepaside (starting at the Heritage Park) to Wisemans Bridge beach and pub. The Dramway is a man-made fine gravel pathway which is flat. The pathway is suitable for bicycles, pushchairs, disabled scooters and walkers of all levels and is a bridleway. This is a popular shortcut for holiday makers and locals to the beach, Wisemans Bridge pub, Coppet Hall and Saundersfoot Harbour. The Dramway is 2 1/2 miles (4.0 km) long from Stepaside to Saundersfoot Harbour and during the holiday season many walkers and cyclists can be seen using this path which meets Route 4 cycle route at Wisemans Bridge.

Stepaside is a holiday hamlet with the nearest shops and community facilities one mile away in Kilgetty. Properties in Stepaside range from old stone cottages, new-build contemporary houses, bungalows, and converted buildings such as The Old School which is now residential and a block of apartments.
