= Saundersfoot =

Village and community in Pembrokeshire, Wales

Saundersfoot: Welsh: Llanusyllt
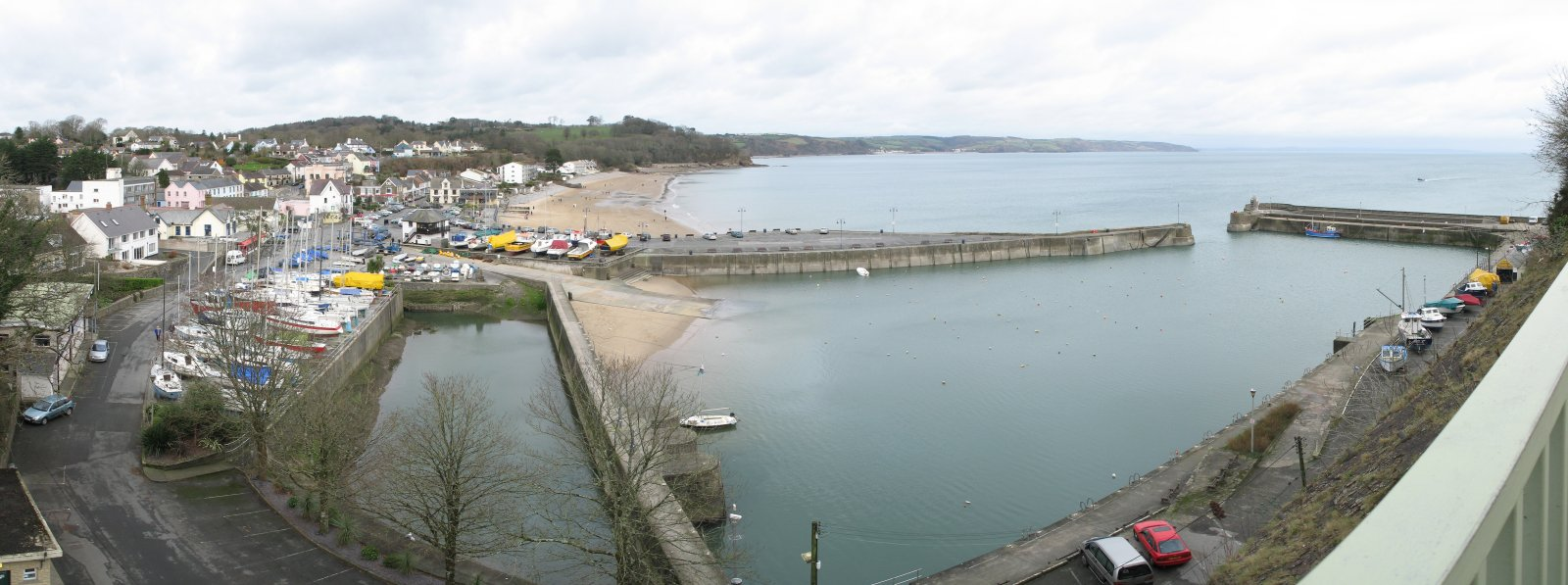
- Saundersfoot harbour and village

- Location within Pembrokeshire
- Population: 2,500 (2021 census)
- OS grid reference: SN136048
- Community: Saundersfoot
- Principal area: Pembrokeshire
- Preserved county: Dyfed
- Country: Wales
- Sovereign state: United Kingdom
- Post town: Saundersfoot
- Postcode district: SA69
- Dialling code: 01834
- Police: Dyfed-Powys
- Fire: Mid and West Wales
- Ambulance: Welsh
- UK Parliament: Mid and South Pembrokeshire
- Senedd Cymru – Welsh Parliament: Ceredigion Penfro
- List of places UK Wales Pembrokeshire 51.711°N 4.700°W Map of the community

Saundersfoot (sometimes Welsh: Llanusyllt; Old Welsh: Llanussyllt) is a large village and community (and former electoral ward) in Pembrokeshire, Wales. It is near Tenby, both being holiday destinations. Saundersfoot lies in the Pembrokeshire Coast National Park and on the Pembrokeshire Coast Path. The village population was recorded as 2,500 (rounded to the nearest 100) in the 2021 census.

== History ==
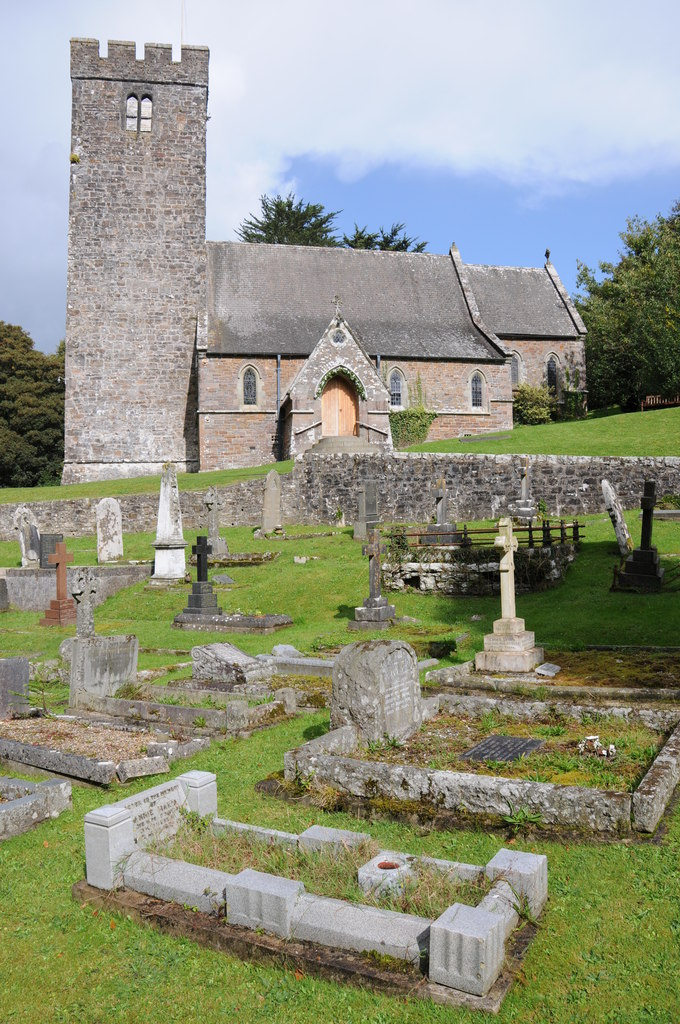
St Issell's church

Saundersfoot was known in medieval Wales as Llanussyllt, and after the Norman conquest as St. Issels (sometimes Issells), both after the parish church dedicated to the Welsh saint Issel. It appeared as St. Tissels on a 1578 parish map of Pembrokeshire. Its bishop or abbot was considered one of the seven principal clerics of Dyfed under medieval Welsh law. It was a substantial parish in 1833 with 1,226 inhabitants. John Marius Wilson described the village and parish as St Issells in his 1870–72 Imperial Gazetteer of England and Wales. The church lies in a dell to the north of Saundersfoot and is a grade II* listed building.

== Harbour ==
Permission to build the harbour was granted by Parliament in 1829 to the Saundersfoot Railway and Harbour Company for the export of anthracite coal from the many mines in the area, although coal was exported from the beach for centuries before this. The village grew up to serve the port which by 1837 had five jetties handling coal and iron ore and subsequently pig iron and firebricks from local sources. The course of the tramway from Bonville's Court mine bisects the village and ends at the jetty. The tramway from Stepaside forms the sea front. The industry finally faded away in the early years of the twentieth century, so that today, the harbour accommodates private moorings, pleasure boats for seasonal tourism, and small fishing charters.

== Demographics ==
In 2021, the recorded population of Saundersfoot was 2,500. Of this, 39.3% were aged 65+, above the county average of 26.3%. The largest ethnic group is White who make up 97.1% of the population, above the county average of 97.6%, with the second largest being Asian/Asian British with 1.4% of the population, below the county average of 0.9%. The largest religious group was recorded as Christian who make up 56.4% of the population, above the county average of 48.8%, with the second largest being No religion, who make up 35.5% of the population, below the county average of 43.0%.

== Governance ==
At the local level, councillors are elected to Saundersfoot Community Council to oversee local issues, such as planning applications and maintenance of the local public buildings and cemetery.

Until 2022 the boundaries of the Saundersfoot community were coterminous with a Saundersfoot electoral ward, electing one county councillor to Pembrokeshire County Council. Councillor Rosemary Hayes MBE was the ward's representative on South Pembrokeshire District Council and Pembrokeshire County Council for 25 years, before losing to Phil Baker at the May 2008 elections.

Following the recommendations of a boundary review by the Local Government Boundary Commission for Wales, effective from the 2022 local elections, the Saundersfoot ward was split into North and South. The north part was merged with the neighbouring community of Amroth to create a new ward of 'Amroth and Saundersfoot North'. The south part became a new county ward of 'Saundersfoot South'. Both wards elect a councillor to the county council.

== Notable people ==
- William Frost (1848–1935), a Welsh designer of an early flying machine, the Frost Airship Glider.
- Rod de'Ath (1950–2014), a Welsh musician, drummer with Irish guitarist Rory Gallagher
- Jay James Picton (born 1983), a Welsh recording artist, songwriter with The Overtones and broadcaster

== Transport ==
Saundersfoot railway station is a mile from the village centre off the B4316 road. Trains call every two hours, westwards to Pembroke Dock and eastwards to Whitland, Carmarthen and Swansea.

Buses are run by 2 bus companies. The first one being First Cymru and second one being Taf Vally Coaches. Services run to surrounding towns and villages.

== Saundersfoot swim ==
Saundersfoot holds its New Year's Day swim every year which is sponsored by local businesses. More than 1,500 people took part in 2016. Due to COVID-19, the 2021 event was cancelled but was allowed to go ahead again in 2023.
